= List of songs recorded by Harry Connick Jr. =

Here is a comprehensive list of studio-recorded songs by Harry Connick Jr. from 1977 to present (Note: Articles, a, an, and the, are not recognized as first words of titles):

Song	Composers	Album	Year	Notes	Ref.
"After You've Gone"	Henry Creamer, Turner Layton	25	1992	instrumental	
"All the Way"	Jimmy Van Heusen, Sammy Cahn	Your Songs	2009	feat. Branford Marsalis on saxophone	
"All These People"	Harry Connick Jr.	Oh, My NOLA	2007	duet with Kim Burrell	
"All These Things"	Allen Toussaint	Only You	2004		
"All Things"	Harry Connick Jr.	Occasion : Connick on Piano, Volume 2	2005	instrumental	
"All Things" (2)	Harry Connick Jr.	Harry on Broadway, Act I	2006		
"And I Love Her"	Lennon–McCartney	Your Songs	2009		
"And I Love You So"	Don McLean	Your Songs	2009		
"Ash Wednesday"	Harry Connick Jr.	Chanson du Vieux Carré : Connick on Piano, Volume 3	2007	instrumental	
"Auld Lang Syne"	traditional	What a Night! A Christmas Album bonus track	2008	instrumental	
"Autumn in New York"	Vernon Duke	When Harry Met Sally...	1989	instrumental	
"Avalon"	V. Rose, A. Jolson, B. DeSylva	20	1988	instrumental	
"Ave Maria"	Franz Schubert, Sir Walter Scott	When My Heart Finds Christmas	1993		
"Baby, It's Cold Outside"	Frank Loesser	Lee Ann Womack album: The Season for Romance	2002	duet with Lee Ann Womack	
"The Bare Necessities"	Terry Gilkyson	Various Artists album: Simply Mad About The Mouse	1991		
"Basin Street Blues"	Spencer Williams	Dixieland Plus	1977	instrumental	
"Basin Street Blues" (2)	Spencer Williams	20	1988		
"Bayou Maharajah"	Harry Connick Jr.	Lofty's Roach Souffle	1990	instrumental	
"Bésame Mucho"	Consuelo Velázquez, Sunny Skylar	Your Songs	2009	Lyrics in Spanish and English	
"Between Us"	Harry Connick Jr., Ramsey McLean	She	1994		
"The Blessed Dawn Of Christmas Day"	Harry Connick Jr.	When My Heart Finds Christmas	1993		
"A Blessing and a Curse"	Harry Connick Jr., Ramsey McLean	Blue Light, Red Light	1991		
"Blue Christmas"	Billy Hayes, Jay W. Johnson	Harry for the Holidays	2003		
"Blue Light, Red Light (Someone's There)"	Harry Connick Jr., Ramsey McLean	Blue Light, Red Light	1991		
"Blue Skies"	Irving Berlin	20	1988	instrumental	
"Bommer's Boogie"	Harry Connick Jr.	Dixieland Plus	1977	instrumental	
"Booker"	Harry Connick Jr., Ramsey McLean	She	1994		
"Boozehound"	Harry Connick Jr.	Star Turtle	1996		
"Bourbon Street Parade"	Paul Barbarin	Dixieland Plus	1977	instrumental	
"Bourbon Street Parade" (2)	Paul Barbarin	Chanson du Vieux Carré : Connick on Piano, Volume 3	2007	instrumental	
"Brown World"	Harry Connick Jr.	Occasion : Connick on Piano, Volume 2	2005	instrumental	
"Buried in Blue"	Harry Connick Jr., Ramsey McLean	We Are in Love	1990		
"But Not for Me"	George Gershwin, Ira Gershwin	When Harry Met Sally...	1989		
"Can't Help Falling in Love With You"	George David Weiss, Hugo Peretti, Luigi Creatore	Your Songs	2009	feat. Wynton Marsalis on trumpet	
"Can't We Tell"	Harry Connick Jr.	Other Hours : Connick on Piano, Volume 1	2003	instrumental	
"Can't We Tell" (2)	Harry Connick Jr.	Harry on Broadway, Act I	2006	duet with Kelli O'Hara	
"Caravan"	Duke Ellington, Irving Mills, Juan Tizol	25	1992	instrumental	
"Careless Love"	Martin Kaelin, Mac Rebennack	Oh, My NOLA	2007		
"Change Partners"	Irving Berlin	Come by Me	1999		
"Chanson Du Vieux Carre"	Harry Connick Jr.	Occasion : Connick on Piano, Volume 2	2005	instrumental	
"Chanson du Vieux Carré" (2)	Harry Connick Jr.	Chanson du Vieux Carré : Connick on Piano, Volume 3	2007	instrumental	
"Charade"	Henry Mancini, Johnny Mercer	Come by Me	1999		
"Chattanooga Choo Choo"	Mack Gordon, Harry Warren	30	2001	instrumental	
"Christmas Day"	Harry Connick Jr.	What a Night! A Christmas Album	2008		
"Christmas Dreaming"	Irving Gordon, Lester Lee	When My Heart Finds Christmas	1993		
"Christmas Time is Here"	Vince Guaraldi, Lee Mendelson	What a Night! A Christmas Album bonus track	2008		
"The Christmas Waltz"	Sammy Cahn, Jule Styne	Harry for the Holidays	2003		
"City Beneath the Sea	Harry Connick Jr.	Star Turtle	1996		
"Colomby Day"	Harry Connick Jr.	Lofty's Roach Souffle	1990	instrumental	
"Come By Me"	Harry Connick Jr.	Come by Me	1999		
"Cry Me a River"	Arthur Hamilton	Come by Me	1999		
"Dance Of The Sugarplum Fairies"	Pyotr Ilyich Tchaikovsky	What a Night! A Christmas Album	2008	instrumental	
"Danny Boy"	Frederic Weatherly	Come by Me	1999		
"Deck the Halls"	traditional	What a Night! A Christmas Album bonus track	2008		
"Didn't He Ramble"	Harry Bolton	25	1992		
"Ding-Dong! The Witch Is Dead"	Harold Arlen, E.Y. "Yip" Harburg	Songs I Heard	2001		
"Do Nothin' Till You Hear From Me"	Duke Ellington, Bob Russell	20	1988		
"Do Dat Thing"	Harry Connick Jr.	Oh, My NOLA	2007		
"Do You Know What It Means To Miss New Orleans"	E. DeLange, L. Alter	20	1988	duet with Dr. John	
"Do-Re-Mi"	Richard Rodgers, Oscar Hammerstein II	Songs I Heard	2001		
"Doctor Jazz"	Joe "King" Oliver, Walter Melrose	Eleven	1979		
"Don't Fence Me In"	Robert Fletcher, Cole Porter	30	2001		
"Don't Get Around Much Anymore"	Duke Ellington, Bob Russell	When Harry Met Sally...	1989		
"Don't Like Goodbyes"	Harold Arlen, Truman Capote	30	2001		
"Drifting"	Marc Shaiman	We Are in Love	1990		
"Dumb Luck"	Harry Connick Jr.	Other Hours : Connick on Piano, Volume 1	2003	instrumental	
"E"	Harry Connick Jr.	Harry Connick Jr	1987	instrumental	
"Easy for You to Say"	Harry Connick Jr.	Come by Me	1999		
"Edelweiss"	Richard Rodgers, Oscar Hammerstein II	Songs I Heard	2001		
"Elijah Rock"	traditional	Oh, My NOLA	2007		
"Eyes of the Seeker"	Harry Connick Jr.	Star Turtle	1996		
"Fidgety Feet"	Eddie Edwards, Nick LaRocca, Henry Ragas, Tony Sbarbaro, Larry Shields	Chanson du Vieux Carré : Connick on Piano, Volume 3	2007	instrumental	
"First Time Ever I Saw Your Face"	Ewan MacColl	Your Songs	2009		
"Five Foot Two, Eyes of Blue"	Ray Henderson, Sam Lewis, Joe Young	Dixieland Plus	1977	instrumental	
"For Once in My Life"	Orlando Murden, Ronald Miller	Only You	2004		
"Forever, for Now"	Harry Connick Jr., Ramsey McLean	We Are in Love	1990		
"Frosty The Snow Man"	Steve Nelson, Jack Rollins	Harry for the Holidays	2003		
"Funky Dunky"	Harry Connick Jr.	She	1994		
"Good Night My Love (Pleasant Dreams)"	George Motola, John Marascalco	Only You	2004		
"Good To Be Home"	Harry Connick Jr.	Occasion : Connick on Piano, Volume 2	2005	instrumental	
"The Gypsy"	Billy Reid	30	2001		
"The Happy Elf"	Harry Connick Jr.	Harry for the Holidays	2003		
"Harronymous"	Harry Connick Jr.	Lofty's Roach Souffle	1990	instrumental	
"He Is They Are"	Harry Connick Jr.	Blue Light, Red Light	1991		
"Hear Me in the Harmony"	Harry Connick Jr.	Star Turtle	1996		
"Heart Beyond Repair"	Harry Connick Jr.	To See You	1997		
"Heavenly"	Harry Connick Jr., Ramsey McLean	We Are in Love	1990		
"Hello Dolly"	Jerry Herman	Oh, My NOLA	2007		
"Here Comes the Big Parade"	Harry Connick Jr., Ramsey McLean	She	1994		
"Hernando's Hideaway"	Richard Adler, Jerry Ross	Harry on Broadway, Act I	2006	duet with Megan Lawrence	
"Hey There"	Richard Adler, Jerry Ross	Harry on Broadway, Act I	2006		
"Hey There" (2)	Richard Adler, Jerry Ross	Harry on Broadway, Act I	2006		
"Hey There Reprise / If You Win You Lose"	Richard Adler, Jerry Ross	Harry on Broadway, Act I	2006	duet with Kelli O'Hara	
"Holly Jolly Christmas"	Johnny Marks	What a Night! A Christmas Album	2008		
"Honestly Now (Safety's Just Danger...Out of Place)"	Harry Connick Jr., Ramsey McLean	She	1994		
"How About Tonight"	Harry Connick Jr.	Other Hours : Connick on Piano, Volume 1	2003	instrumental	
"How Do Y'all Know"	Harry Connick Jr.	Star Turtle	1996		
"Hudson Bomber"	Harry Connick Jr.	Lofty's Roach Souffle	1990	instrumental	
"I Come With Love"	Harry Connick Jr.	Harry for the Holidays	2003		
"(I Could Only) Whisper Your Name"	Harry Connick Jr., Ramsey McLean	She	1994		
"I Could Write a Book"	Lorenz Hart, Richard Rodgers	When Harry Met Sally...	1989		
"I Like Love More"	Harry Connick Jr.	Occasion : Connick on Piano, Volume 2	2005	instrumental	
"I Like Love More"	Harry Connick Jr.	Harry on Broadway, Act I	2006	duet with Kelli O'Hara	
"I Mean You"	Thelonious Monk	Harry Connick Jr	1987	instrumental	
"I Only Have Eyes for You"	Al Dubin, Harry Warren	Only You	2004		
"I Pray On Christmas"	Harry Connick Jr.	When My Heart Finds Christmas	1993		
"I Still Get Jealous"	Sammy Cahn, Jule Styne	Chanson du Vieux Carré : Connick on Piano, Volume 3	2007	instrumental	
"I Wish You Love"	Léo Chauliac, Albert A. Beach	France, I Wish You Love, France compilation	1993		
"I Wonder As I Wander"	traditional	Harry for the Holidays	2003		
"I'll Be Home for Christmas"	Kim Gannon, Walter Kent, Buck Ram	Harry for the Holidays	2003		
"I'll Dream of You Again"	Harry Connick Jr.	We Are in Love	1990		
"I'll Only Miss Her When I Think of Her"	Sammy Cahn, Jimmy Van Heusen	30	2001		
"I'm An Old Cowhand (From The Rio Grande)"	Johnny Mercer	25	1992		
"I'm Gonna Be The First One"	Harry Connick Jr.	Harry for the Holidays	2003		
"I'm Walkin'"	Dave Bartholomew, Fats Domino	30	2001		
"Golden Ticket"/"I Want It Now"	Leslie Bricusse, Anthony Newley	Songs I Heard	2001		
"I've Got a Great Idea"	Harry Connick Jr.	We Are in Love	1990		
"If I Could Give You More"	Harry Connick Jr., Ramsey McLean	Blue Light, Red Light	1991		
"If I Only Had A Brain"	Harold Arlen, E.Y. "Yip" Harburg	20	1988		
"If I Were a Bell"	Frank Loesser	30	2001		
"Imagination"	J. Burke, J. VanHeusen	20	1988		
"In Love Again"	Harry Connick Jr.	To See You	1997		
"It Had to Be You"	Isham Jones, Gus Kahn	When Harry Met Sally...	1989		
"It Had to Be You (Instrumental Trio)"	Isham Jones, Gus Kahn	When Harry Met Sally...	1989	instrumental	
"(It Must've Been Ol') Santa Claus"	Harry Connick Jr.	When My Heart Finds Christmas	1993		
"It's All Right with Me"	Cole Porter	We Are in Love	1990		
"It's Beginning to Look a Lot Like Christmas"	Meredith Willson	What a Night! A Christmas Album	2008		
"It's the Most Wonderful Time of the Year"	Edward Pola, George Wyle	What a Night! A Christmas Album	2008		
"It's Time"	Harry Connick Jr., Ramsey McLean	Blue Light, Red Light	1991		
"Jambalaya (On The Bayou)"	Hank Williams	Oh, My NOLA	2007		
"Jazz Me Blues"	Tom Delaney	Eleven	1979	instrumental	
"Jill"	Harry Connick Jr.	Blue Light, Red Light	1991		
"Jingle Bells"	James Lord Pierpont	What a Night! A Christmas Album	2008		
"The Jitterbug"	Harold Arlen, E.Y. "Yip" Harburg	Songs I Heard	2001		
"Joe Avery's Piece"	traditional	Eleven	1979	instrumental	
"Joe Slam and the Spaceship"	Harry Connick Jr., Jonathan DuBose, Tony Hall	She	1994		
"Junco Partner"	Bob Shad	30	2001		
"Just a Boy"	Harry Connick Jr., Ramsey McLean	We Are in Love	1990		
"Just a Closer Walk with Thee"	Sallie Martin	Dixieland Plus	1977	instrumental	
"Just a Closer Walk With Thee" (2)	Sallie Martin	Come by Me bonus track	1999		
"Just Come Home"		Oh, My NOLA bonus track	2007		
"Just Kiss Me"	Harry Connick Jr.	Blue Light, Red Light	1991		
"Just Like Me"	Harry Connick Jr.	Star Turtle	1996		
"Just the Way You Are"	Billy Joel	Your Songs	2009		
"Killing Me Softly"	Charles Fox, Norman Gimbel	Your Songs bonus track	2009		
"The Last Payday"	Harry Connick Jr., Ramsey McLean	Blue Light, Red Light	1991		
"Lazy River"	Hoagy Carmichael, Sidney Arodin	Eleven	1979	instrumental	
"Lazy River" (2)	Hoagy Carmichael, Sidney Arodin	20	1988	instrumental	
"Lazybones"	Hoagy Carmichael, Johnny Mercer	25	1992	duet with Johnny Adams	
"Lazybones" (2)	Hoagy Carmichael, Johnny Mercer	Oh, My NOLA	2007		
"Learn to Love"	Harry Connick Jr.	To See You	1997		
"Let It Snow! Let It Snow! Let It Snow!"	Sammy Cahn, Jule Styne	When My Heart Finds Christmas	1993		
"Let Me Love Tonight"	Harry Connick Jr.	To See You	1997		
"Let Me Love You, It's OK"		Swing Time, Japan compilation	1992		
"Let Them Talk"	Harry Carlson, Lew Douglas, Erwin King	Oh, My NOLA	2007		
"Let There Be Peace On Earth"	Sy Miller, Jill Jackson	What a Night! A Christmas Album	2008	duet with Kim Burrell	
"Let's Call the Whole Thing Off"	George Gershwin, Ira Gershwin	When Harry Met Sally...	1989		
"Let's Just Kiss"	Harry Connick Jr.	To See You	1997		
"Little Clown"	Harry Connick Jr.	Harry Connick Jr	1987	instrumental	
"Little Dancing Girl"	Harry Connick Jr.	Lofty's Roach Souffle	1990	instrumental	
"The Little Drummer Boy"	Katherine K. Davis, Henry Onorati, Harry Simeone	When My Heart Finds Christmas	1993		
"Little Farley"	Harry Connick Jr.	Star Turtle	1996		
"Little Waltz"	Ron Carter	Harry Connick Jr	1987	instrumental	
"Lofty's Roach Soufflé"	Harry Connick Jr.	Lofty's Roach Souffle	1990	instrumental	
"The Lonely Goatherd"	Oscar Hammerstein II, Richard Rodgers	Songs I Heard	2001		
"Lonely Side"	Harry Connick Jr.	Lofty's Roach Souffle	1990	instrumental	
"Lose"	Harry Connick Jr.	Occasion : Connick on Piano, Volume 2	2005	instrumental	
"Love for Sale"	Cole Porter	Come by Me	1999		
"Love Is Here to Stay"	George Gershwin, Ira Gershwin	Harry Connick Jr	1987	instrumental	
"Love Is Here to Stay"	George Gershwin, Ira Gershwin	When Harry Met Sally...	1989		
"Love Me Some You"	Harry Connick Jr.	To See You	1997		
"Loved by Me"	Harry Connick Jr.	To See You	1997		
"Luscious"	Harry Connick Jr.	Chanson du Vieux Carré : Connick on Piano, Volume 3	2007	instrumental	
"Mardi Gras in New Orleans"	Professor Longhair	Chanson du Vieux Carré : Connick on Piano, Volume 3	2007	instrumental	
"Mary Ruth"	Harry Connick Jr.	Lofty's Roach Souffle	1990	instrumental	
"Mary's Little Boy Child"	Jester Hairston	Harry for the Holidays	2003		
"Maybe"	Martin Charnin, Charles Strouse	Songs I Heard	2001		
"Merry Old Land of Oz"	Harold Arlen, E.Y. "Yip" Harburg	Songs I Heard	2001		
"A Moment With Me"	Harry Connick Jr.	Come by Me	1999		
"Moment's Notice"	John Coltrane	25	1992	instrumental	
"Mona Lisa"	Jay Livingston, Ray Evans	Your Songs	2009		
"More"	Riz Ortolani, Nino Oliviero, Norman Newell	Only You	2004		
"Mr. Spill"	Harry Connick Jr.	Lofty's Roach Souffle	1990	instrumental	
"Much Love"	Harry Connick Jr.	To See You	1997		
"Muskrat Ramble"	Ray Gilbert, Kid Ory	Eleven	1979	instrumental	
"Music, Maestro, Please"	Herbert Magidson, Allie Wrubel	25	1992	instrumental	
"Muskrat Ramble"	Ray Gilbert, Kid Ory	25	1992	instrumental	
"My Blue Heaven"	Walter Donaldson, George A. Whiting	Only You	2004		
"My Girl Back Home"	Richard Rodgers, Oscar Hammerstein II	South Pacific soundtrack	2001	duet with Glenn Close	
"My Little World"	Harry Connick Jr.	Other Hours : Connick on Piano, Volume 1	2003	instrumental	
"My Prayer"	Jimmy Kennedy, Georges Boulanger	Only You	2004		
"Nature Boy"	eden ahbez	Harry for the Holidays	2003		
"Never Young"	Harry Connick Jr.	Star Turtle	1996		
"New Orleans"	Hoagy Carmichael	30	2001	instrumental	
"New Orleans" (2)	Hoagy Carmichael	Chanson du Vieux Carré : Connick on Piano, Volume 3	2007	instrumental	
"A New Town Is A Blue Town"	Richard Adler, Jerry Ross	Harry on Broadway, Act I	2006		
"Next Door Blues"	Harry Connick Jr.	Come by Me	1999		
"A Nightingale Sang in Berkeley Square"	Eric Maschwitz, Manning Sherwin	We Are in Love	1990		
"Nobody Like You to Me"	Harry Connick Jr.	Star Turtle	1996		
"Nothin' New For New Year"	Harry Connick Jr.	Harry for the Holidays	2003	duet with George Jones	
"Nowhere With Love"	Harry Connick Jr.	Come by Me	1999		
"O Christmas Tree"	traditional	What a Night! A Christmas Album bonus track	2008		
"O Come All Ye Faithful"	traditional	What a Night! A Christmas Album	2008		
"O Holy Night"	Adolphe Adam, Placide Cappeau	When My Heart Finds Christmas	1993		
"O Little Town of Bethlehem"	Lewis H. Redner, Phillip Brooks	Harry for the Holidays	2003		
"Occasion"	Branford Marsalis	Occasion : Connick on Piano, Volume 2	2005	instrumental	
"Oh, Ain't That Sweet"	Harry Connick Jr.	Other Hours : Connick on Piano, Volume 1	2003	instrumental	
"Oh! Ain't That Sweet" (2)	Harry Connick Jr.	Harry on Broadway, Act I	2006		
"Oh, My Dear (Something's Gone Wrong)"	Harry Connick Jr.	Other Hours : Connick on Piano, Volume 1	2003	instrumental	
"Oh, My Dear (Something's Gone Wrong)" (2)	Harry Connick Jr.	Harry on Broadway, Act I	2006		
"Oh, My NOLA"	Harry Connick Jr.	Oh, My NOLA	2007		
"On Green Dolphin Street"	Ned Washington, Bronisław Kaper	Harry Connick Jr	1987	instrumental	
"On the Atchison, Topeka and the Santa Fe"	Johnny Mercer, Harry Warren	25	1992	feat. Ray Brown on bass	
"On The Street Where You Live"	Alan Jay Lerner, Frederick Loewe	25	1992		
"Once"	Harry Connick Jr.	To See You	1997		
"Once A Year Day"	Richard Adler, Jerry Ross	Harry on Broadway, Act I	2006	duet with Kelli O'Hara	
"One Last Pitch"	Harry Connick Jr., Joe Livingston	Lofty's Roach Souffle	1990	instrumental	
"One Last Pitch (Take Two)"	Harry Connick Jr., Joe Livingston	Lofty's Roach Souffle	1990	instrumental	
"Only 'Cause I Don't Have You"	Harry Connick Jr., Ramsey McLean	We Are in Love	1990		
"Only You"	Buck Ram, Ande Rand	Only You	2004		
"Oompa Loompa"	Leslie Bricusse, Anthony Newley	Songs I Heard	2001		
"The Other Hours"	Harry Connick Jr.	Other Hours : Connick on Piano, Volume 1	2003	instrumental	
"Other Hours" (2)	Harry Connick Jr.	Only You	2004		
"Over The Rainbow"	Harold Arlen, E.Y. "Yip" Harburg	Songs I Heard	2001		
"Panama"	William H. Tyers	Chanson du Vieux Carré : Connick on Piano, Volume 3	2007	instrumental	
"Parade of the Wooden Soldiers"	Ballard Macdonald, Leon Jessel	When My Heart Finds Christmas	1993		
"Parle Plus Bas"	Boris Bergman, Nino Rota	Come by Me bonus track	1999	Lyrics in French	
"Petite Fleur"	Sidney Bechet	Dixieland Plus	1977	instrumental	
"Petite Fleur" (2)	Sidney Bechet	Chanson du Vieux Carré : Connick on Piano, Volume 3	2007	instrumental	
"Please Come Home for Christmas"	Charles Brown, Gene Redd	What a Night! A Christmas Album	2008		
"Please Don't Talk About Me When I'm Gone"	Sidney Clare, Sam H. Stept	20	1988	duet with Carmen McRae	
"Promise Me You'll Remember (Love Theme From The Godfather Part III)"	Coppola, John Bettis	The Godfather Part III soundtrack	1990		
"Pure Imagination"/"Candy Man"	Leslie Bricusse, Anthony Newley	Songs I Heard	2001		
"Reason to Believe"	Harry Connick Jr.	Star Turtle	1996		
"Recipe for Love"	Harry Connick Jr.	We Are in Love	1990		
"Remember The Tarpon"	Harry Connick Jr.	Occasion : Connick on Piano, Volume 2	2005	instrumental	
"Rocky Mountain Moon"	Johnny Mercer	Harry Connick Sr. album: New Orleans... My Home Town	1998	duet with Harry Connick Sr.	
"Rudolph the Red-Nosed Reindeer"	Johnny Marks	When My Heart Finds Christmas	1993		
"S'wonderful"	George Gershwin, Ira Gershwin	20	1988	instrumental	
"Santa Claus Is Coming to Town"	J. Fred Coots, Haven Gillespie	Harry for the Holidays	2003		
"Santariffic"	Harry Connick Jr.	What a Night! A Christmas Album	2008	feat. Lucien Barbarin on trombone	
"Save the Last Dance for Me"	Doc Pomus, Mort Shuman	Only You	2004		
"She"	Harry Connick Jr., Ramsey McLean	She	1994		
"She Belongs To Me"	Harry Connick Jr.	Blue Light, Red Light	1991		
"Sheik Of Araby"	Harry B. Smith, Francis Wheeler, Ted Snyder	Oh, My NOLA	2007		
"Silent Night"	Franz Gruber, Josef Mohr	Harry for the Holidays	2003		
"Silver Bells"	Ray Evans, Jay Livingston	Harry for the Holidays	2003		
"Silver Bells" (2)	Jay Livingston, Ray Evans	Various Artists album: And So This Is Christmas	1999		
"Sleigh Ride"	Leroy Anderson, Mitchell Parish	When My Heart Finds Christmas	1993		
"Small Talk"	Richard Adler, Jerry Ross	Harry on Broadway, Act I	2006	duet with Kelli O'Hara	
"Smile"	Charlie Chaplin, John Turner, Geoffrey Parsons	Your Songs	2009		
"Some Enchanted Evening"	Oscar Hammerstein II, Richard Rodgers	Your Songs	2009		
"Someday"	Dave Bartholomew, Pearl King	Oh, My NOLA	2007		
"Someday You'll Be Sorry"	Louis Armstrong	Chanson du Vieux Carré : Connick on Piano, Volume 3	2007	instrumental	
"Something Was Missing"	Martin Charnin, Charles Strouse	Songs I Heard	2001		
"Something You Got"	Chris Kenner	Oh, My NOLA	2007		
"Somewhere My Love"	Maurice Jarre	30	2001	instrumental	
"Song for the Hopeful"	Harry Connick Jr.	What a Night! A Christmas Album	2008	duet with Kim Burrell	
"Sonny Cried"	Harry Connick Jr., Ramsey McLean	Blue Light, Red Light	1991		
"Sovereign Lover"	Harry Connick Jr.	Other Hours : Connick on Piano, Volume 1	2003	instrumental	
"Speak Softly Love"	Nino Rota	30	2001	instrumental	
"A Spoonful of Sugar"	Richard M. Sherman	Songs I Heard	2001		
"Spot"	Harry Connick Jr.	Occasion : Connick on Piano, Volume 2	2005	instrumental	
"St. James Infirmary"	traditional	Dixieland Plus	1977		
"St. Louis Blues"	W. C. Handy	Dixieland Plus	1977	instrumental	
"Star Turtle"	Harry Connick Jr.	Star Turtle	1996	instrumental	
"Star Turtle 2"	Harry Connick Jr.	Star Turtle	1996	instrumental	
"Star Turtle 3"	Harry Connick Jr.	Star Turtle	1996	instrumental	
"Star Turtle 4"	Harry Connick Jr.	Star Turtle	1996	instrumental	
"Stardust"	Hoagy Carmichael, Mitchell Parish	25	1992	feat. Ellis Marsalis on piano	
"Stars Fell on Alabama"	M. Parish, F. Perkins	20	1988	instrumental	
"Stay Awake"	Richard M. Sherman, Robert B. Sherman	Songs I Heard	2001		
"Steam Heat"	Richard Adler, Jerry Ross	Harry on Broadway, Act I bonus track	2006	duet with Kelli O'Hara	
"Steve Lacy"	Branford Marsalis	Occasion : Connick on Piano, Volume 2	2005	instrumental	
"Stompin' at the Savoy"	Benny Goodman, Chick Webb, Edgar Sampson, Andy Razaf	When Harry Met Sally...	1989	instrumental	
"Such Love"	Harry Connick Jr.	Other Hours : Connick on Piano, Volume 1	2003	instrumental	
"Such Love"	Harry Connick Jr.	Harry on Broadway, Act I	2006		
"Sunny Side Of The Street"	Dorothy Fields, Jimmy McHugh	Harry Connick Jr	1987	instrumental	
"Supercalifragilisticexpialidocious"	Richard M. Sherman	Songs I Heard	2001		
"Sweet Georgia Brown"	Maceo Pinkard, Kenneth Casey, Ben Bernie	Eleven	1979	instrumental	
"Take Advantage"	Harry Connick Jr.	Other Hours : Connick on Piano, Volume 1	2003	instrumental	
"Take Advantage" (2)	Harry Connick Jr.	Harry on Broadway, Act I	2006		
"Take Her To The Mardi Gras"	Harry Connick Jr.	Harry on Broadway, Act I	2006		
"Take Her To The Mardi Gras" (2)	Harry Connick Jr.	Oh, My NOLA bonus track	2007		
"Tangerine"	Johnny Mercer, Victor Schertzinger	25	1992		
"That Party"	Harry Connick Jr., Ramsey McLean	She	1994		
"That's a Plenty"	Lew Pollack	Chanson du Vieux Carré : Connick on Piano, Volume 3	2007	instrumental	
"There Is Always One More Time"	Ken Hirsch, Doc Pomus	30	2001		
"There Once Was A Man"	Richard Adler, Jerry Ross	Harry on Broadway, Act I	2006	duet with Kelli O'Hara	
"There Once Was A Man" (2)	Richard Adler, Jerry Ross	Harry on Broadway, Act I	2006	duet with Kelli O'Hara	
"There Once Was a Man" (3)	Richard Adler, Jerry Ross	Harry on Broadway, Act I bonus track	2006	duet with Kelli O'Hara	
"There's No Business Like Show Business"	Irving Berlin	Come by Me	1999		
"(They Long to Be) Close to You"	Burt Bacharach, Hal David	Your Songs	2009		
"This Christmas"	Donny Hathaway	Harry for the Holidays	2003		
"This Christmas" (2)	Donny Hathaway	Various Artists album: A Jazzy Wonderland	1990		
"This Guy's in Love with You"	Burt Bacharach, Hal David	One Fine Day soundtrack	1996		
"This Time the Dream's on Me"	Harold Arlen, Johnny Mercer	25	1992		
"Tico Tico"	Zequinha de Abreu	Chanson du Vieux Carré : Connick on Piano, Volume 3 bonus track	2007	instrumental	
"Tie a Yellow Ribbon 'Round the Ole Oak Tree"	Irwin Levine, L. Russell Brown	30	2001	instrumental	
"Time After Time"	Sammy Cahn, Jule Styne	Come by Me	1999		
"Tin Roof Blues"	Walter Melrose, Leon Rappolo, Paul Mares, Ben Pollock, George Brunies, Mel Stitzel	Eleven	1979	instrumental	
"To Love the Language"	Harry Connick Jr., Ramsey McLean	She	1994		
"To See You"	Harry Connick Jr.	To See You	1997		
"Trouble"	Harry Connick Jr., Ramsey McLean	She	1994		
"Try a Little Tenderness"	James Campbell, Reginald Connelly, Harry M. Woods	Only You bonus track	2004		
"Valentine's Day"	Harry Connick Jr.	Occasion : Connick on Piano, Volume 2	2005	instrumental	
"The Very Thought of You"	Ray Noble	Only You	2004		
"Virgoid"	Harry Connick Jr.	Occasion : Connick on Piano, Volume 2	2005	instrumental	
"Vocation"	Harry Connick Jr.	Harry Connick Jr	1987	instrumental	
"Voodoo Mama"	Harry Connick Jr.	"Voodoo Mama" / "Hear Me In The Harmony"	1996		
"Way Down Yonder in New Orleans"	Henry Creamer, Turner Layton	Eleven	1979	instrumental	
"Way Down Yonder in New Orleans" (2)	Henry Creamer, Turner Layton	30	2001		
"The Way You Look Tonight"	Jerome Kern, Dorothy Fields	Your Songs	2009		
"We Are in Love"	Harry Connick Jr.	We Are in Love	1990		
"We Make A Lot Of Love"	Harry Connick Jr.	Oh, My NOLA	2007		
"We Three Kings"	Reverend John Henry Hopkins Jr.	What a Night! A Christmas Album	2008		
"What A Night!"	Harry Connick Jr.	What a Night! A Christmas Album	2008		
"What a Waste"	Harry Connick Jr.	Other Hours : Connick on Piano, Volume 1	2003	instrumental	
"What Are You Doing New Year's Eve?"	Frank Loesser	When My Heart Finds Christmas	1993		
"What Child Is This?"	William Dix, 16th Century English melody	When My Heart Finds Christmas	1993		
"When I Get My Name In Lights"	Peter Allen	Peter Allen album: Making Every Moment Count	1990	duet with Peter Allen	
"When My Heart Finds Christmas"	Harry Connick Jr.	When My Heart Finds Christmas	1993		
"When The Saints Go Marching In"	James Milton Black, Katharine Purvis	Dixieland Plus	1977		
"Where or When"	Lorenz Hart, Richard Rodgers	When Harry Met Sally...	1989		
"Who Can I Turn To (When Nobody Needs Me)"	Leslie Bricusse, Anthony Newley	Your Songs	2009		
"Win"	Harry Connick Jr.	Occasion : Connick on Piano, Volume 2	2005	instrumental	
"A Wink And A Smile"	Ramsey McLean, Marc Shaiman	Sleepless in Seattle soundtrack	1993		
"Winter Wonderland"	Felix Bernard, Richard B. Smith	When Harry Met Sally...	1989	instrumental	
"Winter Wonderland" (2)	Felix Bernard, Richard B. Smith	What a Night! A Christmas Album	2008	duet with Sarah Kate Connick	
"With Imagination, I'll Get There"	Harry Connick Jr., Ramsey McLean	Blue Light, Red Light	1991		
"Wonder in the World"	Harry Connick Jr.	Kelli O'Hara album: Wonder in the World	2008	duet with Kelli O'Hara	
"Wolverine Blues"	Jelly Roll Morton, Benjamin Spikes, John Spikes	Eleven	1979	instrumental	
"Won't You Come Home, Bill Bailey?"	Hughie Cannon	Oh, My NOLA	2007		
"The World Around Us"	Richard Adler, Jerry Ross	Harry on Broadway, Act I	2006		
"Working In The Coal Mine"	Allen Toussaint	Oh, My NOLA	2007		
"Yes Sir, That's My Baby"	Walter Donaldson, Gus Kahn	Dixieland Plus	1977	instrumental	
"Yes We Can Can"	Allen Toussaint	Oh, My NOLA	2007		
"You Didn't Know Me When"	Harry Connick Jr., Ramsey McLean	Blue Light, Red Light	1991		
"You Don't Know Me"	Cindy Walker, Eddy Arnold	Only You	2004		
"You Go to My Head"	J. Fred Coots, Haven Gillespie	Various Artists album: Jubilation	1989		
"You'd Be So Easy to Love"	Cole Porter	Come by Me	1999		
"You're Never Fully Dressed Without a Smile"	Martin Charnin, Charles Strouse	Songs I Heard	2001		
"You've Got to Be Carefully Taught"	Richard Rodgers, Oscar Hammerstein II	South Pacific soundtrack	2001		
"Younger Than Springtime"	Richard Rodgers, Oscar Hammerstein II	South Pacific soundtrack	2001		
"Your Own Private Love"	Harry Connick Jr.	Other Hours : Connick on Piano, Volume 1	2003	instrumental	
"Your Song"	Elton John, Bernie Taupin	Your Songs	2009		
"Zat You Santa Claus"	Jack Fox	What a Night! A Christmas Album	2008		
"Zealousy"	Harry Connick Jr.	Harry Connick Jr	1987	instrumental	
