= Harry Connick Jr. discography =

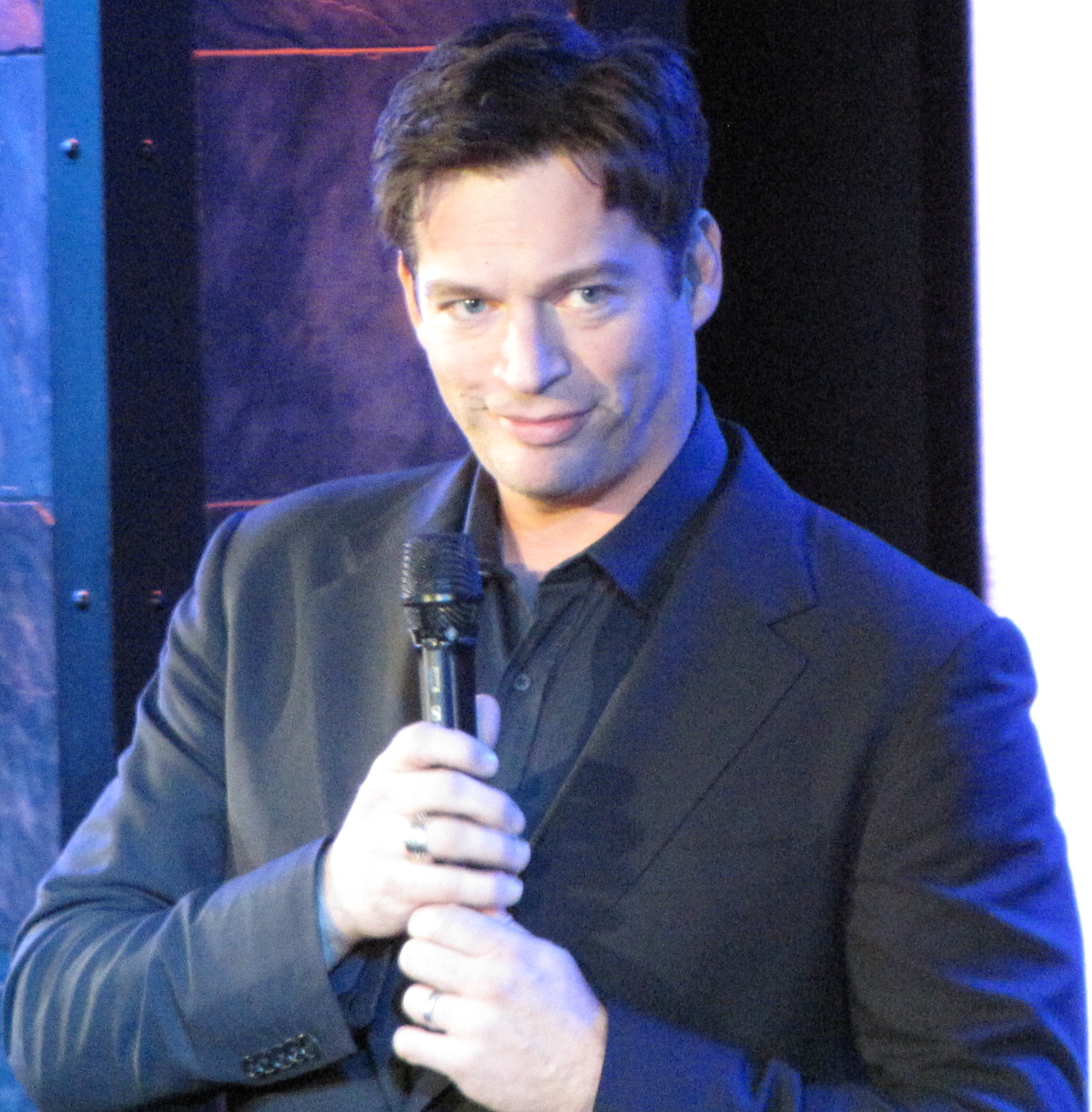
- Connick in 2010
- Studio albums: 26
- Video albums: 8

American singer Harry Connick Jr. has released 26 albums, including 21 albums on Sony, three albums on the Marsalis Music label, and one each on Adco Productions and on Papa's-June Music.

His best-selling album to date (August 2009) in the United States is his 1993 multi-platinum Christmas album When My Heart Finds Christmas, which is also one of the best-selling Christmas albums of the Nielsen SoundScan era in the United States. His highest-charting album to date is Only You, which reached #5 in the US and #6 in the UK.

Connick has had the most No. 1 albums (11) on the Billboard Top Jazz Albums chart. He has sold over 15 million albums in the US (16 million certified).

== Albums ==
U.S. certification information is from RIAA, Canadian certification information from CRIA, Australian certification information from ARIA, French certification information from SNEP, U.S. chart positions are from Allmusic and Billboard.

=== Vocal albums ===
Year	Album	Chart positions			Certifications	Note	Label
Year	Album	US	US Jazz	AUS	Certifications	Note	Label
1988	20	133	6		US: Platinum		Sony
1990	We Are in Love	22	1	120	US: 2× Platinum; CAN: Platinum	Grammy win	Sony
1991	Blue Light, Red Light	17	1	10	US: 2× Platinum; CAN: Platinum; AUS: Gold	Grammy nomination	Sony
1992	25	19	1	23	US: Platinum; CAN: Gold		Sony
1993	When My Heart Finds Christmas	13		116	US: 3× Platinum; CAN: Gold		Sony
1994	She	16		3	US: Platinum; CAN: Gold; AUS: 2× Platinum		Sony
1996	Star Turtle	38		16	US: Gold		Sony
1997	To See You	53	1	123	US: Gold		Sony
1999	Come by Me	36	1	25	US: Gold	Grammy nomination	Sony
2001	30	94	3				Sony
2001	Songs I Heard	88	2			Grammy win	Sony
2003	Harry for the Holidays	12	1		US: Platinum		Sony
2004	Only You	5	1	34	US: Platinum; CAN: Gold; AUS: Gold	Grammy nomination	Sony
2007	Oh, My NOLA	11	1	165			Sony
2008	What a Night! A Christmas Album	20	1				Sony
2009	Your Songs	8	1	9		Grammy nomination	Sony
2013	Smokey Mary		3				Sony
2013	Every Man Should Know	33	1	155			Sony
2015	That Would Be Me	47		134			Sony
2019	True Love: A Celebration of Cole Porter	77					Sony
2021	Alone With My Faith					Grammy nomination	Verve Records
2022	Make It Merry						Verve Records

=== Instrumental albums ===
Year	Album	Chart positions		Certifications	Note	Label
Year	Album	US	US Jazz	Certifications	Note	Label
1977	Dixieland Plus					Alco Productions
1979 (1992)	Pure Dixieland; Eleven		14			Sony
1987	Harry Connick Jr.			US: Gold		Sony
1990	Lofty's Roach Souffle	94	4		Grammy nomination (song)	Sony
2003	Other Hours: Connick on Piano, Volume 1		2			Marsalis Music
2005	Occasion: Connick on Piano, Volume 2		5			Marsalis Music
2007	Chanson du Vieux Carré : Connick on Piano, Volume 3		3		Grammy nomination (song)	Marsalis Music
2011	Music from the Happy Elf: Connick on Piano, Volume 4					Marsalis Music

=== Live albums ===
Year	Album	Chart positions		Certifications	Note	Label
Year	Album	US	US Jazz	Certifications	Note	Label
2011	In Concert on Broadway	76	1			Sony

=== Soundtracks and cast albums ===
Year	Album	Chart positions			Certifications	Note	Label
Year	Album	US	US Jazz	AUS	Certifications	Note	Label
1989	When Harry Met Sally...	42	1	97	US: 2× Platinum; CAN: Gold	Grammy win	Sony
2002	Thou Shalt Not					Tony nomination	Papa's-June Music
2006	Harry on Broadway, Act I	97				Grammy nomination Double disc, includes the cast album for The Pajama Game	Sony

==== Soundtrack appearances ====
- 1991 The Godfather Part III / Carmine Coppola – #12 "Promise Me You'll Remember"
- 1993 Sleepless in Seattle / Various Artists – #8 "A Wink and a Smile"
- 1994 The Mask / Various Artists – #5 "(I Could Only) Whisper Your Name"
- 1996 One Fine Day / Various Artists – #11 "This Guy's in Love with You"
- 1998 Kissing a Fool / Various Artists – "Learn to Love" and "We Are in Love" (appears in the movie, not on the soundtrack)
- 2001 South Pacific / Various Artists – #9 "Younger than Springtime", #14 "You've Got to Be Carefully Taught" and #17 "My Girl Back Home"

=== Compilations ===
Year	Album	Chart positions			Certifications	Note	Label
Year	Album	US	US Jazz	AUS	Certifications	Note	Label
1991	It Had to Be You			4	AUS: Platinum	Australian compilation	Sony
1992	Swing Time					Japanese compilation, includes "Let Me Love You, It's OK"	Sony
1993	Forever for Now			96	AUS: Gold	European/Australian compilation	Sony
1993	France, I Wish You Love				FRA: 2× Gold	French compilation, includes "I Wish You Love"	Sony

=== Various appearances ===
These tracks are not found on any of Connick's own albums.

- 1989 Jubilation / Various Artists – #7 "You Go to My Head"
- 1990 A Jazzy Wonderland / Various Artists – #1 "This Christmas"
- 1990 Making Every Moment Count / Peter Allen – #3 "When I Get My Name in Lights"
- 1991 Simply Mad About the Mouse / Various Artists – #6 "The Bare Necessities"
- 1996 Octane: The Sound Track / Silicon Graphics – #3 "OCTANE Swing"
- 1998 New Orleans... My Home Town / Harry Connick Sr. – #2 "Rocky Mountain Moon"
- 1999 And So This Is Christmas / Various Artists – "Silver Bells"
- 1999 My Jelly Lord: Standard Time Vol. Six / Wynton Marsalis – #12 "Billy Goat Stomp"
- 2002 The Season for Romance / Lee Ann Womack & Harry Connick Jr. (duet) – "Baby, It's Cold Outside"
- 2002 A Jazz Celebration / The Marsalis Family – #10 "Saint James Infirmary"
- 2003 Romare Bearden Revealed / Branford Marsalis Quartet – #9 "Carolina Shout"
- 2007 Marsalis Music Honors Series: Bob French / Bob French – Sitting in on piano
- 2008 Wonder in the World / Kelli O'Hara - arranged and orchestrated by Connick, three tracks written by Connick, plays piano on 12 of the 14 tracks, and sings a duet with O'Hara.
- 2010 Music Redeems / The Marsalis Family – #7 "Sweet Georgia Brown"

== DVDs ==
Year	Album	Certifications	Note	Label
1990	Singin' and Swingin'	US: Gold	VHS	Sony
1990	Swingin' Out Live	US: Platinum	VHS	Sony
1993	The New York Big Band Concert	US: Gold	VHS, DVD: 1999	Sony
1994	The Harry Connick Jr. Christmas Special		VHS	Sony
2003	Harry for the Holidays		DVD	Sony
2004	Only You: In Concert	US: Platinum; AUS: Platinum	Emmy win. DVD	Sony
2005	A Duo Occasion		DVD	Marsalis Music
2011	In Concert on Broadway		DVD	Sony

== See also ==
- Songs recorded by Harry Connick Jr.
