= Forever for Now (Harry Connick Jr. album) =

Forever For Now

Compilation album by Harry Connick Jr.
- Released: 1993
- Genre: Big Band
- Label: Sony/Columbia

Forever For Now is a compilation album from Harry Connick Jr., released in the United Kingdom in 1993.

The album was a blend of original studio recordings from seven of Connick's previous albums, two of which he had won a Grammy Award for. The album has five tracks from When Harry Met Sally... (1989), one track from 20 (1988), one from Harry Connick Jr. (1987), five from We Are in Love (1990), one from Lofty's Roach Souffle (1990), two from Blue Light, Red Light (1991) and one from 25 (1992). Five of those seven albums have sold to platinum or multi platinum in the United States.

== Track listing ==
1. "It Had to Be You" (Isham Jones, Gus Kahn)
2. "Our Love Is Here to Stay" (George Gershwin, Ira Gershwin)
3. "Forever, for Now" (Harry Connick Jr., Ramsey McLean)
4. "Stardust" (Hoagy Carmichael, Mitchell Parish) – feat. Ellis Marsalis
5. "Do You Know What It Means To Miss New Orleans" (Eddie DeLange, Louis Alter)
6. "Recipe for Love" (Connick)
7. "One Last Pitch" (Connick, Joe Livingston)
8. "Heavenly" (Connick, McLean)
9. "Blue Light, Red Light (Someone's There)" (Connick, McLean)
10. "But Not for Me" (G. Gershwin, I. Gershwin)
11. "Little Clown" (Connick)
12. "Where or When" (Lorenz Hart, Richard Rodgers)
13. "Don't Get Around Much Anymore" (Duke Ellington, Bob Russell)
14. "You Didn't Know Me When" (Connick, McLean)
15. "It's All Right with Me" (Cole Porter)
16. "We Are in Love" (Connick)

== Album chart ==
- Netherlands – peak: 83 / weeks: 5
