= Thou Shalt Not (album) =

Thou Shalt Not original Broadway cast recording

Cast recording by Harry Connick Jr.
- Released: (United States) June 18, 2002
- Genre: Cast album
- Length: 1:17:24
- Label: Papa's-June Music
- Producer: Tracey Freeman; Harry Connick Jr.

Harry Connick Jr. chronology
Songs I Heard (2001)	Thou Shalt Not original Broadway cast recording (2002)	Other Hours: Connick on Piano, Volume 1 (2003)

Professional ratings
Review scores
Source	Rating
Allmusic	3.5/5 stars

Thou Shalt Not is the original cast recording of Harry Connick Jr.'s Tony nominated score from the 2001 Broadway musical of the same name. The 77-minute album was released in 2002 on the Papa's-June Music label. Although music and lyrics were by Connick he does not sing on this album, but plays the piano as an "additional musician", and does the orchestrations and arrangements, and is a producer on the album.

== Track listing ==
1. ACT ONE: "Overture" – 2:16
2. "It's Good To Be Home" – 5:17 – J.C. Montgomery, Ted L. Levy & Ensemble
3. "I Need To Be in Love Ballet" – 3:04 – Kate Levering
4. "My Little World" – 3:26 – Debra Monk
5. "While You're Young" – 1:40 – Craig Bierko
6. "I Need To Be in Love" – 3:00 – Kate Levering
7. "Broken Tea Cup" – 1:32
8. "The Other Hours" – 3:49 – Craig Bierko
9. "The Other Hours Ballet" – 3:10 – Craig Bierko, Kate Levering
10. "All Things" – 2:30 – Norbert Leo Butz
11. "Sovereign Lover" – 5:07 – Kate Levering, Craig Bierko & Ensemble
12. "I've Got My Eye on You" – 3:14 – Debra Monk, Norbert Leo Butz
13. "Light the Way" – 2:41 – Ensemble
14. "Take Her to the Mardi Gras" – 5:12 – Craig Bierko, Norbert Leo Butz, Kate Levering & Ensemble
15. "Tug Boat" – 4:15 – Norbert Leo Butz, Kate Levering
16. ACT TWO: "Entr'Acte" – 1:06
17. "Won't You Sanctify" – 3:06 – Ted L. Levy & Ensemble
18. "Time Passing" – 2:26 – Kate Levering, Craig Bierko, Debra Monk & Ensemble
19. "Take Advantage" – 3:50 – Leo Burmester
20. "Oh! Ain't That Sweet" – 3:35 – Norbert Leo Butz
21. "Thou Shalt Not Ballet" – 8:33 – Kate Levering, Craig Bierko & Ensemble
22. "I Like Love More" – 2:49
23. "It's Good To Be Home (reprise)" – 1:46 – Norbert Leo Butz

== Other releases ==
- Sony released the two-disc album Harry on Broadway, Act I in 2006: 1. disc, Original Broadway cast recording The Pajama Game; 2. disc, Songs from Thou Shalt Not, Harry Connick Jr featuring Kelli O'Hara
- Versions of "I Like Love More", "All Things" and "Good To Be Home" are part of the 2005 instrumental album Occasion : Connick on Piano, Volume 2, with Harry Connick Jr on piano and Branford Marsalis on saxophone.
- A recording of "Other Hours" with Harry Connick Jr on vocal, is on his 2004 Grammy nominated album Only You.
- Connick's 2003 instrumental album Other Hours : Connick on Piano, Volume 1, consists of 12 compositions written for Thou Shalt Not, including some not used in the final version of the play.
