= Lucien Barbarin =

American trombonist (1956–2020)

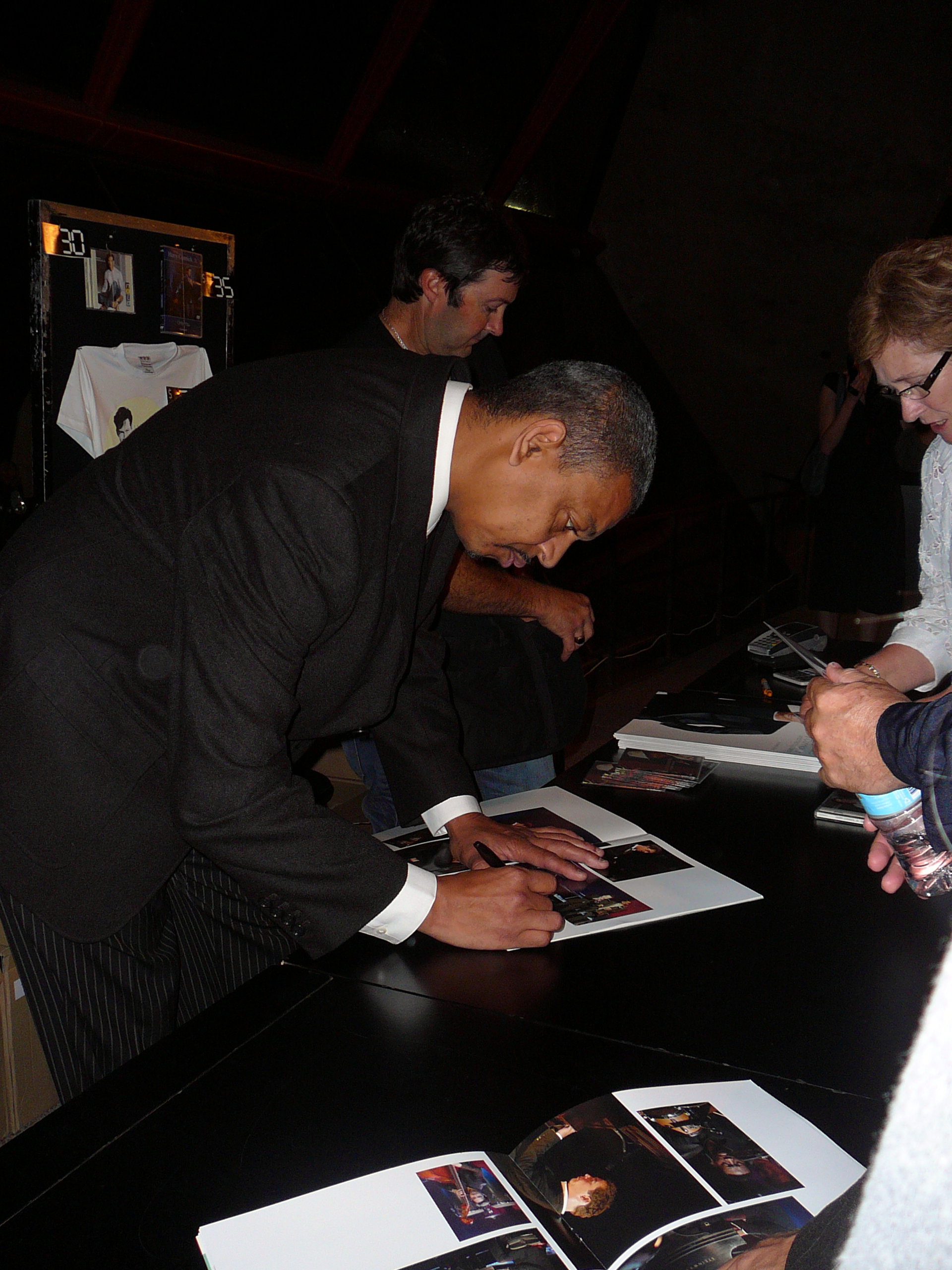
- Barbarin in 2008 at the Sydney Opera House after appearing with Harry Connick Jr.

Background information
- Born: July 17, 1956; New Orleans, Louisiana, U.S.
- Died: January 30, 2020 (aged 63)
- Genres: Jazz
- Instrument: Trombone

Lucien Barbarin (July 17, 1956 – January 30, 2020) was an American trombone player. Barbarin toured internationally with the Preservation Hall Jazz Band and with Harry Connick Jr.

He made his debut at the age of six, playing drums in the Onward Brass Band, with his great-uncle Paul Barbarin.

In New Orleans, Barbarin performed locally. After Hurricane Katrina severely damaged his home in 2005, he said: "I'm not running from New Orleans. [...] I'm going to stay because I was born and raised here and I'm going to pass away here." He died from prostate cancer on January 30, 2020, at the age of 63.

Connick’s recording of "How Great Thou Art" from the CD Alone with My Faith is dedicated to him.

== Discography ==
=== As leader ===
- It's Good to be Home, independent, 2007
- Little Becomes Much: Jazz at the Palm Court Vol. 3, Lucien Barbarin & the Palm Court Swingsters, GHB Records, 2000
- Trombone Tradition, Lucien Barbarin with Henry Chaix Trio, Jazz Connoisseur, 1989

=== As sideman ===
- 2019 Lady and the Tramp - Featured artist
- 2008 What a Night! A Christmas Album – Harry Connick Jr.
- 2007 Oh, My NOLA – Harry Connick Jr.
- 2007 Chanson du Vieux Carré : Connick On Piano, Volume 3 – Harry Connick Jr.
- 2004 Unforgivable Blackness – Wynton Marsalis
- 2004 Dancing In The Sky – Michael White
- 2003 The Marsalis Family: A Jazz Celebration – The Marsalis Family
- 2003 Shake That Thing – Preservation Hall Jazz Band
- 2003 Harry for the Holidays – Harry Connick Jr.
- 2002 Jazz From the Soul of New Orleans – Michael White
- 2002 My One and Only Love – Topsy Chapman And The Pro's
- 2001 Songs I Heard – Harry Connick Jr.
- 2000 Song for George Lewis – Michael White
- 1999 Mr. Jelly Lord – Wynton Marsalis
- 1999 Come By Me – Harry Connick Jr.
- 1997 Doc Cheatham & Nicholas Payton – Doc Cheatham & Nicholas Payton
- 1995 Star Turtle – Harry Connick Jr.
- 1994 Mo' Cream from the Crop – Leroy Jones
- 1993 When My Heart Finds Christmas – Harry Connick Jr.
- 1992 World on a String – Kermit Ruffins
- 1991 Blue Light, Red Light – Harry Connick Jr.
- 1976 Hurricane Jazz Band – Hurricane Jazz Band

== Filmography ==
- 2019 Bolden (Movie)
- 2011 Harry Connick Jr. – In Concert On Broadway (DVD) – Harry Connick Jr.
- 2011 Tradition is a Temple
- 2004 Only You: In Concert (PBS) – Harry Connick Jr.
- 2003 Harry for the Holidays (NBC) – Harry Connick Jr.
- 2003 The Marsalis Family: A Jazz Celebration (PBS) – The Marsalis Family
- 2000 Armstrong—When the Saints Go Marching In (PBS) – Lincoln Center Jazz Orchestra with Wynton Marsalis and special guests
- 1994 The Harry Connick Jr. Christmas Special (video) – Harry Connick Jr.
- 1993 The Harry Connick Jr. Christmas Special (CBS) – Harry Connick Jr.
- 1993 The New York Big Band Concert (Video) – Harry Connick Jr.
