= Good to Be Home (disambiguation) =

Good to Be Home is a 2014 album by Blu (rapper)

Good to Be Home may also refer to:

- Good To Be Home, album by Paul Clark and Friends 1975
- "Good to Be Home", by Harry Connick, Jr. with Branford Marsalis; composed by Harry Connick, Jr. List of songs recorded by Harry Connick, Jr.
