= Forever for Now =

Forever for Now may refer to:

- Forever for Now (April Wine album), 1977
- Forever for Now (Harry Connick, Jr. album), 1993
- Forever for Now (LP album), 2014
