= Chanson du Vieux Carré: Connick on Piano, Volume 3 =

Chanson du Vieux Carré

Studio album by Harry Connick Jr.
- Released: January 30, 2007
- Recorded: May 2003
- Genre: Big Band
- Label: Marsalis Music
- Producer: Tracey Freeman

Harry Connick Jr. chronology
Harry on Broadway, Act I (2006)	Chanson du Vieux Carré (2007)	Oh, My NOLA (2007)

Connick on Piano chronology
Occasion (2005)	Chanson du Vieux Carré (2007)

Professional ratings
Review scores
Source	Rating
Allmusic	3.5/5 stars
JazzTimes	(Favorable)
Music Box	3.5/5 stars

Chanson du Vieux Carré: Connick On Piano, Volume 3 (2007) is Harry Connick Jr.'s 3rd album from Marsalis Music. It is recorded with his big band, and features mostly instrumental tracks except for two vocal tracks by band members Leroy Jones on "Bourbon Street Parade" and Lucien Barbarin on "Luscious" .

There are two of Connick's original compositions: "Chanson du Vieux Carre" and "Ash Wednesday". "Chanson du Vieux Carré" is also recorded on Connick's 2005 album Occasion. The title "Chanson Du Vieux Carré", means "Song of the French Quarter".

A portion of the royalties of the album will be donated to Musicians' Village in New Orleans.

The album was released on the same day as his big band vocal album Oh, My NOLA. He began his concert tour, the My New Orleans Tour, on February 23, 2007. One of these dates was the closing act at the New Orleans Jazz & Heritage Festival, on May 6.

== Track listing ==
1. "Someday You'll Be Sorry" (Louis Armstrong) – 04:46
2. "Panama" (William H. Tyers) – 04:43
3. "Ash Wednesday" (Harry Connick Jr.) – 06:17
4. "Chanson du Vieux Carré" (Connick) – 04:06
5. "Bourbon Street Parade" (Paul Barbarin) – 06:01
6. "Petite Fleur" (Sidney Bechet) – 04:11
7. "Fidgety Feet" (Eddie Edwards, Nick LaRocca, Henry Ragas, Tony Sbarbaro, Larry Shields) – 05:34
8. "Luscious" (Connick) – 06:32
9. "New Orleans" (Hoagy Carmichael) – 05:38
10. "I Still Get Jealous" (Sammy Cahn, Jule Styne) – 03:00
11. "That's a Plenty" (Lew Pollack) – 04:07
12. "Mardi Gras in New Orleans" (Professor Longhair) – 06:06

=== Bonus track ===
13. "Tico Tico" (Zequinha de Abreu)

== Charts ==
- Billboard Top Jazz Albums # 3

== Awards and nominations ==
- 2008 Grammy Awards nomination: Best Instrumental Composition – "Ash Wednesday"
- 2008 Grammy Awards nomination: Best Instrumental Arrangement – "Ash Wednesday"

== Musicians ==
- Harry Connick Jr. – piano, arranger, conductor, orchestration
- Big band, including:
  - Lucien Barbarin – trombone, and vocals on "Luscious"
  - Leroy Jones – trumpet, and vocals on "Bourbon Street Parade"
  - John Allred – trombone
  - Joe Barati – trombone
  - Neal Caine – bass
  - Derrick Gardner – trumpet
  - Charles "Ned" Goold – saxophone
  - James Greene – alto sax
  - Roger Ingram – trumpet
  - Mike Karn – saxophone
  - Craig Klein – trombone
  - Arthur Latin – drums
  - Joe Magnarelli – trumpet
  - Mark Mullins – trombone
  - David Schumacher – saxophone
  - Jerry Weldon – saxophone
