= Other Hours: Connick on Piano, Volume 1 =

Other Hours

Studio album by Harry Connick Jr.
- Released: July 15, 2003
- Recorded: August 7–9, 2002
- Studios: Bearsville, Woodstock, New York
- Genre: Jazz
- Length: 66:18
- Label: Marsalis Music/Rounder
- Producer: Tracey Freeman

Harry Connick Jr. chronology
Thou Shalt Not (2002)	Other Hours (2003)	Harry for the Holidays (2003)

Connick on Piano chronology
Other Hours (2003)	Occasion (2005)

Professional ratings
Review scores
Source	Rating
Allmusic	link
Rolling Stone	09/04/2003

Other Hours: Connick On Piano Volume 1 is a jazz instrumental album, by Harry Connick Jr., released in 2003. The album features Connick on piano in the context of a small jazz group. Other Hours is his first quartet album, and it was also his first instrumental album in 13 years.

The album is the first of his career not released on Columbia, the label that signed him to a contract when he was 19. Columbia has allowed Connick to release his less commercial (i.e., nonvocal) recordings on the Marsalis Music label, a new company led by longtime friend Branford Marsalis. "The Connick on Piano series will be purely instrumental, with all kinds of configurations: solo, big band, quartet, trio", Connick explains.

The twelve Connick compositions on Other Hours was originally made for the 2001 musical Thou Shalt Not, which was the recipient of a Tony nomination for Best Original Musical Score (music & lyrics by Harry Connick Jr).

A special feature is the cover artwork. Created by his mother, Anita, who died when Connick was only 13 years old. A treasured drawing which holds great significance for the artist. "My mother loved when I played piano for her", Connick explained, "so I thought it would be fitting to have a piece of her vision next to mine."

== Track listing ==
All songs written by Harry Connick Jr.

1. "What a Waste" – 6:59
2. "Such Love" – 5:59
3. "Take Advantage" – 5:16
4. "How About Tonight" – 6:50
5. "Sovereign Lover" – 4:42
6. "My Little World" – 5:07
7. "Oh, My Dear (Something's Gone Wrong)" – 7:47
8. "Can't We Tell" – 2:17
9. "Dumb Luck" – 6:31
10. "Oh, Ain't That Sweet" – 4:40
11. "The Other Hours" – 6:11
12. "Your Own Private Love" – 3:52

Track #11, "The Other Hours" is also recorded with vocal by Connick, on his Grammy nominated album "Only You" from (2004).

Track #2 "Such Love", #3 "Take Advantage", #6 "My Little World", #7 "Oh, My Dear (Something's Gone Wrong)", #8 "Can't We Tell", #10 "Oh, Ain't That Sweet", and again #11 "The Other Hours" are also recorded with vocal by Connick (featuring Kelli O'Hara), on CD2 of his double album "Harry on Broadway, Act I" from (2006).

== Musicians ==
- Harry Connick Jr. – piano
- Ned Goold – tenor sax
- Neal Caine – bass
- Arthur Latin – drums
