= What a Night! A Christmas Album =

Studio album by Harry Connick Jr.
- Released: November 4, 2008
- Recorded: August 21–30, 2008
- Genre: Jazz, Christmas
- Label: Sony/Columbia (U.S.)
- Producer: Tracey Freeman

Harry Connick Jr. chronology
Oh, My NOLA (2007)	What a Night! A Christmas Album (2008)	Your Songs (2009)

Singles from What a Night! A Christmas Album
- 1. "Song for the Hopeful" Released: October 7, 2008

Professional ratings
Review scores
Source	Rating
AllMusic	4/5 stars
Metromix	2.5/5 stars
Windsor Star	3/5 stars
Mercury News	(Favorable)
Eye Weekly	4/5 stars

What a Night! A Christmas Album, by American singer, pianist and bandleader Harry Connick Jr., was released on November 4, 2008., being his third Christmas album, since 1993's When My Heart Finds Christmas and 2003's Harry for the Holidays. The album consists of new recordings of Christmas classics, and new songs written by Connick.

The first public mentioning of recording the album, came in an interview in The Times-Picayune in June 2008.

The album was first called Christmas Day, but the title was changed in September 2008, to What a Night! A Christmas Album.

The track "Song for the Hopeful", is a duet with Kim Burrell. The song was written by Connick for the 2008 television film Living Proof. Burell is also featured on "Let There Be Peace On Earth".

Connick has three daughters with his wife Jill Goodacre, and their middle daughter Sarah Kate, sings a duet with him on the track "Winter Wonderland".

When the track list was first announced, the songs "Christmas Time is Here" and "Trinity", was part of the album. In early October, those two tracks were replaced with two new tracks: "Christmas Day", and an instrumental version of Tchaikovsky's "Dance of the Sugar Plum Fairy".

== Track listing ==
1. "It's the Most Wonderful Time of the Year" (Edward Pola, George Wyle) – 3:28
2. "What a Night!" (Harry Connick Jr.) – 3:24
3. "Christmas Day" (Connick) – 3:24
4. "Have a Holly Jolly Christmas" (Johnny Marks) – 4:05
5. "Please Come Home for Christmas" (Charles Brown, Gene Redd) – 4:26
6. "O Come All Ye Faithful" (traditional) – 4:15
7. "Dance Of The Sugarplum Fairies" (Pyotr Ilyich Tchaikovsky) – 2:46
8. "Let There Be Peace On Earth" (Sy Miller, Jill Jackson) – 3:30 – feat. Kim Burrell
9. "Winter Wonderland" (Felix Bernard, Richard B. Smith) – 3:50 – feat. Kate Connick
10. "It's Beginning to Look a Lot Like Christmas" (Meredith Willson) – 3:30
11. "Santariffic" (Connick) – 3:58 – feat. Lucien Barbarin
12. "Jingle Bells" (James Lord Pierpont) – 5:28
13. "Zat You Santa Claus" (Jack Fox) – 3:40
14. "We Three Kings" (Reverend John Henry Hopkins Jr.) – 4:45
15. "Song for the Hopeful" (Connick) – 4:35 – feat. Kim Burrell

=== iTunes bonus track ===
16. "Auld Lang Syne" (traditional) – 2:16 (album only)
17. Digital Booklet (album only)

=== Barnes & Noble Exclusive Version ===
16. "Deck the Halls" (traditional) – 2:57
17. "Christmas Time is Here" (Vince Guaraldi, Lee Mendelson) – 5:06
18. "O Christmas Tree" (traditional) – 3:22

Disc 2 (DVD)

1. Holiday interview with Harry
2. Photo gallery
3. "(It Must Have Been) Ol’ Santa Claus" ^{[*]}
4. "I Pray on Christmas" ^{[*]}
5. "The Happy Elf" * ^{[*]}

^ [*] also found on the Harry for the Holidays DVD

== Charts ==
=== Weekly charts ===
Chart (2008)	Peak position
US Billboard 200	20
US Top Holiday Albums (Billboard)	5
US Top Jazz Albums (Billboard)	1

=== Year-end charts ===
Chart (2009)	Position
US Billboard 200	146
US Top Jazz Albums (Billboard)	3

== Personnel ==
Arrangement by Harry Connick Jr.

- Harry Connick Jr. – vocals, piano
- Lucien Barbarin – trombone
- Kim Burrell – vocals, piano, keyboards
- Kate Connick – vocals
- James Hall & Worship & Praise – background vocals
- Jonathan Batiste – vocals, keyboards, piano
- Neal Caine – bass
- Jonathan DuBose Jr. – vocals, guitar
- Charles "Ned" Goold – alto saxophone
- Jerry Weldon – tenor saxophone
- Dave Schumacher – baritone saxophone
- Roger Ingram – trumpet
- Tony Kadlek – flugelhorn
- Joe Magnarelli – trumpet
- Jeff Bush – trombone
- Dion Tucker – trombone
- Joe Barati – bass trombone
- Arthur Latin II – drums, percussion
- The Honolulu Heartbreakers – vocals

== Tour ==
A Holiday Celebration Tour
- Tour by Harry Connick Jr.

Harry Connick Jr. concert chronology
- My New Orleans Tour (2007-2008); A Holiday Celebration Tour (2008)

A Holiday Celebration Tour 2008, is a concert tour with his big band to support the album. The tour was confirmed by the official Harry Connick Jr. website in September 2008.

One of their stops included the annual lighting of the Rockefeller Center Christmas Tree.

=== Tour dates ===
Date	City	Country	Venue
North America
November 18, 2008	Louisville, Kentucky	United States	Palace Theatre
November 19, 2008	Cincinnati, Ohio	United States	Taft Theatre
November 20, 2008	Columbus, Ohio	United States	Ohio Theatre
November 21, 2008	Charleston, West Virginia	United States	Clay Center
November 22, 2008	Cleveland, Ohio	United States	State Theatre
November 28, 2008	New York, New York	United States	City Center Theatre
November 29, 2008	New York, New York	United States	City Center Theatre
December 4, 2008	Newark, New Jersey	United States	New Jersey Performing Arts Center
December 5, 2008	Atlantic City, New Jersey	United States	Borgata Event Center
December 7, 2008	St. Louis, Missouri	United States	Fox Theatre
December 9, 2008	Minneapolis, Minnesota	United States	Orpheum Theatre
December 10, 2008	Chicago, Illinois	United States	Chicago Theatre
December 11, 2008	Chicago, Illinois	United States	Chicago Theatre
December 12, 2008	Milwaukee, Wisconsin	United States	Riverside Theater
December 14, 2008	Nashville, Tennessee	United States	Ryman Auditorium
December 16, 2008	Atlanta, Georgia	United States	Cobb Energy Performing Arts Centre
December 17, 2008	Durham, North Carolina	United States	Durham Performing Arts Center
December 19, 2008	Boston, Massachusetts	United States	Colonial Theatre
December 20, 2008	Boston, Massachusetts	United States	Colonial Theatre
December 21, 2008	Boston, Massachusetts	United States	Colonial Theatre
