= Only You (Harry Connick Jr. album) =

Studio album by Harry Connick Jr.
- Released: February 3, 2004
- Recorded: May 13–22, 2003
- Studio: Capitol, Hollywood, California
- Genre: Traditional Pop
- Label: Sony/Columbia
- Producer: Tracey Freeman

Harry Connick Jr. chronology
| Harry for the Holidays (2003) | Only You (2004) | Occasion (2005) |

Professional ratings
Review scores
| Source | Rating |
|---|---|
| Allmusic | 4/5 stars |

Only You is Harry Connick Jr.'s 17th album from Columbia Records, released in February 2004, consisting of versions of songs from the 1920s to the 1960s. A Grammy nominated album, which has made the top ten album charts on both sides of the Atlantic and was certified gold in March 2004, and platinum in July 2004.

Only You debuted at number 5 on the Billboard 200, selling about 140,000 copies in its first week. It also made the top ten of the UK album charts and the Australian top 40 charts.

== Background ==
The initial idea for the album came from Donnie Ierner, the President of Columbia Records who suggested that Connick produce an album of songs that the baby boomers grew up with. In May 2003, Harry Connick Jr entered Capitol Studios to make both Harry for the Holidays and Only You. Whilst playing the piano once used by Nat King Cole, he led his big band through the selection of Christmas songs and 1950s and 1960s.

On his website, Harry Connick Jr. explained that he wanted to perform songs with a real history to them. "Part of what I wanted to do on this record, "was to focus on songs that had their second success in the Fifties. "My Prayer" is a great example. I know that most people associate it with the Platters, but I knew the Ink Spots' version from the Thirties as well. That's why I picked things like "My Blue Heaven" and "I Only Have Eyes for You," songs I remember hearing as a kid that have a real history."

== Track listing ==
1. "More" (Riz Ortolani, Nino Oliviero, Norman Newell, Marcello Ciorciolini) – 4:12
2. "The Very Thought of You" (Ray Noble) – 3:39
3. "Save the Last Dance for Me" (Doc Pomus, Mort Shuman) – 4:50
4. "My Blue Heaven" (Walter Donaldson, George A. Whiting) – 3:16
5. "You Don't Know Me" (Cindy Walker, Eddy Arnold) – 4:03
6. "All These Things" (Allen Toussaint) – 4:41
7. "For Once in My Life" (Orlando Murden, Ronald Miller) – 3:57
8. "Only You" (Buck Ram, Ande Rand) – 4:44
9. "My Prayer" (Jimmy Kennedy, Georges Boulanger) – 4:10
10. "Other Hours" (Harry Connick Jr.) – 4:01
11. "I Only Have Eyes for You" (Al Dubin, Harry Warren) – 4:13
12. "Good Night My Love (Pleasant Dreams)" (George Motola, John Marascalco) – 4:34
- Target included a 5-track bonus CD with the album. The bonus CD is also available with Japan import albums.
1. "Try a Little Tenderness" (Jimmy Campbell and Reg Connelly, Harry M. Woods)
2. "Let's Just Kiss" (Harry Connick Jr.)
3. "Nowhere With Love" (Harry Connick Jr.)
4. "Nature Boy" (Eden Ahbez)
5. "Love Is Here to Stay" (George Gershwin, Ira Gershwin)

Notes

- Track # 10, "Other Hours" is a Connick original, which he wrote for the 2001 musical Thou Shalt Not. The song is also on his 2003 instrumental album Other Hours : Connick on Piano, Volume 1.
- Grammy nomination in 2005 in category Best Traditional Pop Vocal Album
- The Only You tour with the big band, was playing in United States, Canada, Australia and Asia.

My Heart Sings for You promotional single (2004)

- Barnes & Noble included a promotional single, as a Valentine's Day gift, with the purchase of selected albums. The cover of the single had the words "My Heart Sings for You", but the song included was "Only You".

== Music DVD ==
Only You: In Concert DVD (2004)

A music DVD Only You: In Concert was released in March 2004, after it had first aired as a Great Performances special on PBS.

Songs on the DVD (Live video)

1. "Save The Last Dance For Me"
2. "For Once in My Life"
3. "Good Night My Love (Pleasant Dreams)"
4. "It Might As Well Be Spring"
5. "We Are In Love"
6. "The Very Thought Of You"
7. "You Don't Know Me"
8. "Bourbon Street Parade"
9. "There Is Always One More Time"
10. "Sweet Georgia Brown"
11. "I Still Get Jealous"
12. "Other Hours"
13. "My Blue Heaven"
14. "Only You (And You Alone)"
15. "I'm Walkin'"
16. "Come By Me"

Connick won an Emmy for "Outstanding Music Direction" in the "Great Performances" category in September 2004, and received a Gold & Platinum "Music Video – Long Form" Award from the RIAA for his Only You: In Concert DVD, in November 2005.

== Charts ==
| Chart | Provider(s) | Peak position |
|---|---|---|
| Billboard 200 (U.S.) | Billboard | 5 |
| Billboard Top Jazz Albums (U.S.) | Billboard | 1 |
| UK Album Chart | Top40-Charts | 6 |
| UK Album Year-End Chart | Top40-Charts | 100 |
| Australian Album Chart | Australian-charts.com | 34 |
| New Zealand Album Chart | charts.org.nz | 40 |
| French Album Chart | lescharts.com | 75 |

== Certifications ==
| Region | Certification | Certified units/sales |
|---|---|---|
| Australia (ARIA) album | Gold | 35,000^{^} |
| Australia (ARIA) video | Platinum | 15,000^{^} |
| Canada (Music Canada) | Gold | 50,000^{^} |
| United Kingdom (BPI) | Gold | 100,000^{^} |
| United States (RIAA) | Platinum | 1,000,000^{^} |
^{^} Shipments figures based on certification alone.
