= 30 (Harry Connick Jr. album) =

Studio album by Harry Connick Jr.
- Released: October 23, 2001
- Recorded: September 4–8, 1998
- Studios: Sony Music, New York City
- Genre: Jazz
- Label: Sony/Columbia (U.S.)
- Producer: Tracey Freeman

Harry Connick Jr. chronology
Come by Me (1999)	30 (2001)	Songs I Heard (2001)

Professional ratings
Review scores
Source	Rating
Allmusic	4/5 stars
PopMatters	favorable
Entertainment Weekly	A−

30 is an album by American singer Harry Connick Jr. The album was recorded in 1998, when Connick was 30 years old, but it was not released until 3 years later, on the same date as his album Songs I Heard. The album includes both vocal and instrumental tracks.

== Track listing ==
No.	Title	Writer(s)	Length
1.	"I'm Walkin'"	Dave Bartholomew, Fats Domino	2:48
2.	"Chattanooga Choo Choo"	Mack Gordon, Harry Warren	3:39
3.	"Somewhere My Love"	Maurice Jarre	7:09
4.	"The Gypsy"	Billy Reid	5:31
5.	"If I Were a Bell"	Frank Loesser	6:55
6.	"Way Down Yonder in New Orleans"	Henry Creamer, Turner Layton	3:45
7.	"Tie a Yellow Ribbon 'Round the Old Oak Tree"	Irwin Levine, L. Russell Brown	4:10
8.	"There Is Always One More Time"	Ken Hirsch, Doc Pomus	3:52
9.	"New Orleans"	Hoagy Carmichael	4:01
10.	"Speak Softly Love"	Nino Rota	4:02
11.	"Junco Partner"	Bob Shad	6:10
12.	"Don't Fence Me In"	Robert Fletcher, Cole Porter	3:58
13.	"Don't Like Goodbyes"	Harold Arlen, Truman Capote	3:20
14.	"I'll Only Miss Her (When I Think of Her)"	Sammy Cahn, Jimmy Van Heusen	8:51

== Personnel ==
- Harry Connick Jr. – piano, vocals, arranger, liner notes
- Ben Wolfe – bass on track #5 "If I Were a Bell"
- Rev. James Moore – organ, vocals on track #8 "There Is Always One More Time"
- Wynton Marsalis – trumpet on track #14 "I'll Only Miss Her When I Think of Her"
- Tracey Freeman – producer
- Vladimir Meller – mastering
- Steven Kadison – assistant mastering engineer
- Gregg Rubin – recording & mix engineer
- Ryan Hewitt – assistant engineer
- Christopher Austopchuk – art direction
- Alice Butts – art direction
- Palma Kolansky – photography

== Charts ==
Chart (2001)	Provider(s)	Peak position
Billboard 200 (U.S.)	Billboard	94
Billboard Top Jazz Albums (U.S.)	Billboard	3
Billboard Top Internet Albums (U.S.)	Billboard	24
Chart (2002)	Provider(s)	Peak position
Norwegian Album Chart	VG Nett	35
