= I Could Write a Book =

1940 song by Richard Rodgers and Lorenz Hart

Song
- Published: 1940
- Composer: Richard Rodgers
- Lyricist: Lorenz Hart

"I Could Write a Book" is a show tune from the 1940 Rodgers and Hart musical Pal Joey, where it was introduced by Gene Kelly and Leila Ernst. It is considered a standard.

== Critical reception ==
An uncredited critic reviewing "New Plays in Manhattan" for Time said of Pal Joey that the musical contains "all the dancing anyone could want and at least three more great Richard Rodgers tunes: 'I Could Write a Book' (sweet), 'Love Is My Friend' (torchy), 'Bewitched, Bothered and Bewildered' (catchy)."

== Cover versions ==
The song has been covered by such artists as: Anita O'Day, Frank D'Rone, Vince Guaraldi, Frank Sinatra, Harry Connick Jr., and Dinah Washington.

== In popular culture ==
- Harry Connick Jr.'s version of "I Could Write a Book" was used in the 1989 film When Harry Met Sally..., appearing on the film's soundtrack, and also appears on the soundtrack of the 1997 film Deconstructing Harry.
- Dinah Washington's version of "I Could Write a Book", from her 1955 album For Those in Love, was used in the ninth episode of the first season of the television series Ash vs Evil Dead.
