= Dixieland Plus =

Studio album by Dixieland Plus
- Released: 1977
- Recorded: October 29–30, 1977
- Studios: Sea Saint, New Orleans, Louisiana
- Genre: Dixieland
- Length: 31:47
- Label: Alco Productions
- Producer: Harry Connick Sr.

Dixieland Plus chronology
Dixieland Plus (1977)	Pure Dixieland (1979)

Dixieland Plus is an album by Dixieland Jazz band Dixieland Plus, which included a 10 year oldHarry Connick Jr. It was their debut album, recorded Live in New Orleans, Louisiana on Oct. 29-30, 1977. Connick was age 10 at the time of the recording and was simultaneously studying with local piano masters Ellis Marsalis and James Booker.

== Track listing ==
No.	Title	Writer(s)	Length
1.	"Bourbon Street Parade"	Paul Barbarin	3:49
2.	"St. James Infirmary"	Traditional	3:10
3.	"Five Foot Two, Eyes of Blue"	Ray Henderson, Sam M. Lewis, Joseph Widow Young	2:24
4.	"St. Louis Blues"	William Christopher Handy	3:02
5.	"Bommer's Boogie"	Harry Connick Jr.	3:27
6.	"Yes Sir, That's My Baby"	Walter Donaldson, Gus Kahn	3:46
7.	"Just a Closer Walk with Thee"	Traditional	3:14
8.	"Basin Street Blues"	Spencer Williams	3:01
9.	"Petite Fleur"	Sidney Bechet	2:07
10.	"When The Saints Go Marching In"	Traditional	3:47
Total length:			31:47

== Musicians ==
- Harry Connick Jr. – piano; vocal at "St. James Infirmary" and "When The Saints Go Marching In"
- Roy Liberto – trumpet
- Pee Wee Spitelera – clarinet
- Jim Duggan – trombone
- Freddie Kohlman – drums
- Placide Adams – string bass
