= Pure Dixieland =

Studio album by Harry Connick Jr.
- Released: 1979
- Recorded: New Orleans: November 4, 11, 1978
- Genre: Piano, Dixieland
- Length: 28:41
- Label: Sony/Columbia
- Producer: James Duggan

Harry Connick Jr. chronology
Dixieland Plus (1977)	Pure Dixieland (1979)	Harry Connick Jr. (1987)

Eleven
- Cover for the 1992 re-issue, Eleven

Pure Dixieland is a mostly instrumental album of traditional New Orleans classics, from an ensemble of New Orleans jazz masters, including a young Harry Connick Jr. at the age of eleven.

The album was originally released in 1979, titled Pure Dixieland. It was re-released in November 1992 as Eleven.

Professional ratings
Review scores
Source	Rating
Q	(3/93, p.85)

== Track listing ==
1. "Sweet Georgia Brown" (Maceo Pinkard, Kenneth Casey, Ben Bernie) – 4:39
2. "Tin Roof Blues" (Walter Melrose, Leon Rappolo, Paul Mares, Ben Pollack, George Brunies, Mel Stitzel) – 2:55
3. "Wolverine Blues" (Jelly Roll Morton, Benjamin Spikes, John Spikes) – 3:06
4. "Jazz Me Blues" (Tom Delaney) – 3:04
5. "Doctor Jazz" (Joe "King" Oliver, Melrose) – 3:27
6. "Muskrat Ramble" (Ray Gilbert, Kid Ory) – 2:39
7. "Lazy River" (Hoagy Carmichael, Sidney Arodin) – 2:48
8. "Joe Avery's Piece" (Traditional) – 3:11
9. "Way Down Yonder in New Orleans" (Joe Turner Layton, Henry Creamer) – 2:46

== Musicians ==
- Harry Connick Jr. – piano, vocals on "Doctor Jazz"
- Jim Duggan – trombone
- Liston Johnson – clarinet
- Freddie Kohlman – drums
- Walter Payton – bass
- Tedd Riley – trumpet
