= New Orleans (Hoagy Carmichael song) =

"New Orleans" is a 1932 popular song written by Hoagy Carmichael. The song is now considered a jazz standard, along with several other Carmichael compositions such as "Stardust", "Georgia on My Mind" and "Lazy River".

The song was recorded by Bennie Moten's Kansas City Orchestra and the Casa Loma Orchestra as an up-tempo number, but failed to achieve success until Carmichael released a slower version of the song with Scottish vocalist Ella Logan. It was based on the chord progression from the bridge of two earlier standards: "You Took Advantage of Me" and "Wrap Your Troubles in Dreams".

A classic recording is by Ella Logan and Carmichael. Another is by Dorothy Loudon in her album entitled Saloon. Teddi King also covered it on her 1954 album Miss Teddi King. Al Hirt released a version on his 1963 album, Our Man in New Orleans. Canadian rock band Stampeders included a cover of the song on their 1975 album Steamin.

== See also ==
- List of 1930s jazz standards
