= Harry for the Holidays =

Studio album by Harry Connick Jr.
- Released: October 28, 2003
- Recorded: May 13–22, 2003
- Studio: Capitol, Hollywood, California
- Genre: Christmas; big band; orchestral
- Length: 1:04:18
- Label: Sony; Columbia
- Producer: Tracey Freeman

Harry Connick Jr. chronology
Other Hours : Connick on Piano, Volume 1 (2003)	Harry for the Holidays (2003)	Only You (2004)

Harry Connick Jr. Christmas albums chronology
When My Heart Finds Christmas (1993)	Harry for the Holidays (2003)	What a Night! A Christmas Album (2008)

Professional ratings
Review scores
Source	Rating
Allmusic	link
Entertainment Weekly	B− 2/13/04

Harry for the Holidays is American artist Harry Connick Jr.'s second Christmas album, released in 2003. The album features Connick and his 16 piece Big Band and a full section of chordophones.

Harry for the Holidays was the best-selling holiday album in the United States of 2003 according to sales figures from Nielsen/SoundScan, with 687,000 copies sold in the U.S. that year.

A Harry For The Holidays television special, aired on NBC December 23, 2003. The TV special was released on DVD October 19, 2004. The special features Whoopi Goldberg, Nathan Lane, Marc Anthony and Kim Burrell.

Among Harry Connick Jr.'s own compositions is a duet with country singer George Jones on "Nothing New for New Year". This was one of the highlights of the album for Connick: "George Jones is my favorite singer and I was quite surprised and honored that he said yes", Connick said in 2003. "I think he's the most soulful country singer probably of all time."

An animated TV Christmas special "The Happy Elf", aired December 2, 2005 on NBC, and was released on DVD. The special is based on Connick's original song, "The Happy Elf". When asked about the song in 2003, Connick said, "'The Happy Elf' is another kid's song that came from thinking about how cool it would be to work in Santa's [work]shop."

On November 4, 2004, Harry for the Holidays was certified Platinum by the Recording Industry Association of America for shipments of one million copies in the U.S.

== DualDisc version ==
The album was also released as a DualDisc, with the DVD side containing both Dolby Digital 5.1 surround sound mixes and high quality LPCM (better than CD) versions of the album's 16 tracks. Also included are excerpts from the above-mentioned network special; with performances of six songs, including his own "It Must Have Been Ol' Santa Claus" as well as a version of "Blue Christmas" (made famous, as Connick notes before the performance, by Elvis Presley during his 1968 comeback special). An interview with Connick and a trailer for The Happy Elf are also included.

== Track listing ==
No.	Title	Writer(s)	Length
1.	"Frosty the Snowman"	Steve Nelson, Jack Rollins	3:34
2.	"Blue Christmas"	Billy Hayes, Jay W. Johnson	3:23
3.	"The Christmas Waltz"	Sammy Cahn, Jule Styne	3:18
4.	"I Wonder As I Wander"	traditional	3:07
5.	"Silver Bells"	Ray Evans, Jay Livingston	3:58
6.	"Mary's Boy Child"	Jester Hairston	5:10
7.	"Santa Claus Is Coming to Town"	J. Fred Coots, Haven Gillespie	3:56
8.	"The Happy Elf"	Connick	3:42
9.	"I'll Be Home for Christmas"	Kim Gannon, Walter Kent, Buck Ram	5:57
10.	"I Come With Love"	Connick	4:43
11.	"Nature Boy"	eden ahbez	3:49
12.	"O Little Town of Bethlehem"	Lewis H. Redner, Phillips Brooks	3:25
13.	"I'm Gonna Be The First One"	Connick	3:27
14.	"This Christmas"	Donny Hathaway, Nadine McKinnor	3:47
15.	"Nothin' New For New Year" (with George Jones)	Connick	4:08
16.	"Silent Night"	Franz Gruber, Josef Mohr	4:54

== Musicians ==
- Harry Connick Jr. – vocals, piano
- Ned Goold – alto saxophone
- James Greene – alto saxophone
- Jerry Weldon – tenor saxophone
- Mike Karn – tenor saxophone
- Dave Schumacher – baritone saxophone
- Roger Ingram – trumpet
- Derrick Gardner – trumpet
- Leroy Jones – trumpet
- Joe Magnarelli – trumpet
- Mark Mullins – trombone
- Craig Klein – trombone
- John Allred – trombone
- Joe Barati – bass trombone
- Jonathan DuBose Jr. – guitar
- Biff Watson – guitar
- Neal Caine – double bass
- Arthur Latin II – drums, percussion
- Lucien Barbarin – trombone
- 70-piece orchestra

"Nothing New For New Year"

- George Jones – vocals, guitar
- Harry Connick Jr. – vocals, piano
- Neil Caine — double bass
- Arthur Latin II – drums
- Paul Franklin – pedal steel
- Biff Watson – guitar

== Charts ==
- 2004 Top Jazz Albums, peak position # 1
- 2004 The Billboard 200, peak position # 12
- 2004 Top Internet Albums, peak position # 27

== Certifications ==
Region	Certification	Certified units/sales
United States (RIAA)	Platinum	1,100,000

== See also ==
- List of Billboard Top Holiday Albums number ones of the 2000s
