= The Happy Elf (song) =

Song by Harry Connick Jr.

from the album Harry for the Holidays
- Released: October 28, 2003
- Recorded: Capitol Studios, Los Angeles, May 13–22, 2003
- Genre: Christmas, Big Band
- Length: 3:42
- Label: Sony/Columbia
- Songwriter(s): Harry Connick Jr.
- Producer(s): Tracey Freeman

"The Happy Elf" is a holiday song with music and lyrics by Harry Connick Jr.

It was first released on Connick's album Harry for the Holidays, which became the best selling Christmas album of 2003. When asked about the songs on the album, Connick described "The Happy Elf" as a "kids’ song", about "how cool it would be to work in Santa’s shop". It was also recorded for the Harry For The Holidays television special/DVD.

The song became the origin of an animated Christmas TV special, also named The Happy Elf, which aired on NBC in 2005, and was released on DVD the same year. An animated music video of the song became available on the film's official website in 2005.

"The Happy Elf" reached #35 on the singles charts (adult contemporary) in 2005.
