= 20 (Harry Connick Jr. album) =

Studio album by Harry Connick Jr.
- Released: November 1, 1988
- Recorded: May 4–5 and June 28–29, 1988
- Studio: RCA, New York City
- Genre: Solo piano
- Length: 41:27
- Label: Columbia
- Producer: Kevin Blancq, George Butler

Harry Connick Jr. chronology
Harry Connick Jr. (1987)	20 (1988)	When Harry Met Sally... (1989)

Professional ratings
Review scores
Source	Rating
Allmusic	4/5 stars

20 is an album by American singer and pianist Harry Connick Jr. It was recorded when Connick was 20 years old, and released in 1988. It is his second album from Columbia Records, but his first album with vocal (on 6 of 11 tracks), from the label. As with the eponymous album that preceded it, Connick dedicated 20 "to the memory of my loving mother, Anita Connick."

== Track listing ==
No.	Title	Writer(s)	Length
1.	"Avalon"	Vincent Rose; Al Jolson; Buddy De Sylva	3:40
2.	"Blue Skies"	Irving Berlin	3:45
3.	"Imagination"	Johnny Burke; Jimmy Van Heusen	4:24
4.	"Do You Know What It Means to Miss New Orleans"	Eddie DeLange; Louis Alter	5:17
5.	"Basin Street Blues"	Spencer Williams	2:59
6.	"Lazy River"	Hoagy Carmichael; Sidney Arodin	3:34
7.	"Please Don't Talk About Me When I'm Gone"	Sidney Clare; Sam H. Stept	2:35
8.	"Stars Fell on Alabama"	Mitchell Parish; Frank Perkins	4:49
9.	"S'Wonderful"	George Gershwin; Ira Gershwin	3:00
10.	"If I Only Had a Brain"	Harold Arlen; Edgar Yipsel "Yip" Harburg	3:21
11.	"Do Nothin' till You Hear from Me"	Duke Ellington; Bob Russell	4:03
Total length:			41:27

== Musicians ==
- Harry Connick Jr. – Vocals (track No. 3 "Imagination", No. 4 "Do You Know What It Means to Miss New Orleans", No. 5 "Basin Street Blues", No. 7 "Please Don't Talk About Me When I'm Gone", No. 10 "If I Only Had a Brain", No. 11 "Do Nothin' till You Hear from Me"), piano
- Carmen McRae – Vocals on track No. 7 "Please Don't Talk About Me When I'm Gone"
- Dr. John – Organ, vocals on track No. 4 "Do You Know What It Means to Miss New Orleans"
- Robert Leslie Hurst III – Bass on track No. 11 "Do Nothin' till You Hear from Me"

== Charts ==
- 1989 Top Jazz Albums # 6
- 1991 The Billboard 200 # 133

== Certification ==
Region	Certification	Certified units/sales
United States (RIAA)	Platinum	1,000,000^{^}
^{^} Shipments figures based on certification alone.
