= Come by Me =

Studio album by Harry Connick Jr.
- Released: June 1, 1999
- Recorded: July 17–27, 1998
- Studio: Capitol, Los Angeles
- Genre: Big Band
- Length: 63:18
- Label: Columbia
- Producer: Tracey Freeman

Harry Connick Jr. chronology
To See You (1997)	Come by Me (1999)	30 (2001)

Professional ratings
Review scores
Source	Rating
Allmusic	link

Come by Me is a big band album by American artist Harry Connick Jr., released in 1999, eight years after his previous big band recording, Blue Light, Red Light.

Connick and his Big Band went on a year-long world tour (the U.S., Europe, Japan and Australia), in support of the album.

== Track listing ==
1. "Nowhere With Love" (Harry Connick Jr.) – 3:57
2. "Come By Me" (Connick) – 4:01
3. "Charade" (Henry Mancini, Johnny Mercer) – 3:40
4. "Change Partners" (Irving Berlin) – 5:43
5. "Easy for You to Say" (Connick) – 4:54
6. "Time After Time" (Sammy Cahn, Jule Styne) – 5:30
7. "Next Door Blues" (Connick) – 4:11
8. "You'd Be So Easy to Love" (Cole Porter) – 3:06
9. "There's No Business Like Show Business" (Berlin) – 4:48
10. "A Moment With Me" (Connick) – 4:26
11. "Danny Boy" (Frederic Weatherly) – 5:15
12. "Cry Me a River" (Arthur Hamilton) – 4:46
13. "Love for Sale" (Porter) – 8:29

=== Japan bonus track ===
- "Just a Closer Walk With Thee" (Sallie Martin)

=== France bonus track ===
- "Parle Plus Bas" (Boris Bergman, Nino Rota)

== Personnel ==
- Harry Connick Jr. – Vocals, Piano, Arranger, Orchestration
- Peter Doell – Engineer
- Tracey Freeman – Producer
- Ryan Hewitt – Engineer
- Vladimir Meller – Mastering
- Charles Paakkari – Engineer
- Gregg Rubin – Engineer, Mixing

== Charts ==
Come By Me made the first position in the Jazz charts in 1999, and was number 36 on the Billboard 200.

== Certifications ==
Region	Certification	Certified units/sales
United States (RIAA)	Gold	500,000^{^}
^{^} Shipments figures based on certification alone.

== Awards and nominations ==
Grammy nomination for Best Traditional Pop Vocal Performance.
