= Occasion: Connick on Piano, Volume 2 =

Occasion

Studio album by Harry Connick Jr.
- Released: June 14, 2005
- Recorded: March 4–6, 2005
- Studio: Hayti Heritage Center, Durham, North Carolina
- Label: Marsalis Music/Rounder
- Producer: Branford Marsalis, Tracey Freeman

Harry Connick Jr. chronology
Only You (2004)	Occasion (2005)	Harry on Broadway, Act I (2006)

Connick on Piano chronology
Other Hours (2003)	Occasion (2005)	Chanson du Vieux Carré (2007)

Professional ratings
Review scores
Source	Rating
AllMusic	4.5/5 stars
All About Jazz	4/5 stars

Occasion: Connick on Piano, Volume 2 is an instrumental album recorded in 2005, presenting Harry Connick Jr. on piano and Branford Marsalis on saxophone, playing their own jazz compositions.

It is presented as Volume 2 in the Connick on Piano series from Marsalis Music. (Volume 1 is Connick's quartet album Other Hours.)

Connick explains how it came to be a duo album: "When my drummer Arthur Latin hurt his shoulder, I decided to wait before recording another quartet album, and asked Branford if he would do something with me. What started as a project intended to mix solo piano and duo performances turned into an entire duo album."

A DVD with Connick and Marsalis performing music live from this album, A Duo Occasion, was released in November 2005.

== Track listing ==
All songs written by Harry Connick Jr. except where noted.

1. "Brown World" – 4:40
2. "Valentine's Day" – 5:14
3. "Occasion" (Branford Marsalis) – 3:01
4. "Spot" – 5:58
5. "I Like Love More" – 5:05
6. "All Things" – 5:58
7. "Win" – 6:04
8. "Virgoid" – 4:12
9. "Remember The Tarpon" – 7:10
10. "Lose" – 5:51
11. "Steve Lacy" (Marsalis) – 3:16
12. "Chanson Du Vieux Carre" – 2:17
13. "Good To Be Home" – 6:25

Notes

- "Chanson Du Vieux Carre", track #12, means "Song of the French Quarter". Chanson du Vieux Carré is also the name of the third album in the Connick on Piano series.
- Track #5 "I Like Love More", #6 "All Things" and #13 "Good To Be Home" are compositions from Connick's Tony Award nominated score for the 2001 Broadway musical Thou Shalt Not.

== Personnel ==
- Harry Connick Jr. – piano, liner notes
- Branford Marsalis – saxophone (soprano, tenor), producer
- Arnold Levine – art direction, design
- Jean-Pierre LeGuillou – art producer
- Frank Hunter – album photography
- Rob "Wacko" Hunter – engineer, mixing
- Greg Calbi – mastering
- Rick Dior – assistant engineer
- Tracey Freeman – producer
