= She (Harry Connick Jr. album) =

Studio album by Harry Connick Jr.
- Released: July 12, 1994
- Recorded: New Orleans
- Genre: Funk
- Label: Sony Columbia
- Producer: Tracey Freeman

Harry Connick Jr. chronology
When My Heart Finds Christmas (1993)	She (1994)	Star Turtle (1996)

She is a funk album by Harry Connick Jr. recorded in 1994, accompanied by his newly formed funk band. "(I Could Only) Whisper Your Name" was included on Columbia Records' soundtrack from action-comedy The Mask, starring Jim Carrey. It was also Connick's only single to reach the Billboard charts, peaking at #67. The album was certified Platinum.

== Reception ==
Professional ratings
Review scores
Source	Rating
AllMusic	1.5/5 stars
Entertainment Weekly	C−
Q	3/5 stars
The Village Voice	C+

In The Village Voice, Robert Christgau panned She, finding Ramsey McLean's lyrics "dumb" and the band's style of funk lacking in "elasticity and panache".

== Tour ==
Connick took his funk music on a tour of the United Kingdom in 1994, and later to the People's Republic of China in 1995, playing at the Shanghai Center Theatre. 29 October 1994 at the Brighton Centre, some fans left unhappy with the change of direction not expecting the jazz funk of the 'She' album, despite the tour being billed as supporting the new album. Those that remained enjoyed a very energetic performance.

Connick's funk albums She, and Star Turtle sold respectably, though some fans were upset with Connick's departure from his jazz roots.

== Track listing ==
All tracks by Harry Connick Jr. and Ramsey McLean except where noted.

1. "She" – 5:36
2. "Between Us" – 5:57
3. "Here Comes the Big Parade" – 4:11 – an ode to Mardi Gras
4. "Trouble" – 2:40
5. "(I Could Only) Whisper Your Name" – 4:50
6. "Follow the Music" – 1:00
7. "Joe Slam and the Spaceship" (Connick, Jonathan DuBose, Tony Hall) – 7:12
8. "To Love the Language" – 5:01
9. "Honestly Now (Safety's Just Danger...Out of Place)" – 5:31
10. "She...Blessed be the One" – 1:35
11. "Funky Dunky" (Connick) – 6:22
12. "Follow the Music Further" – 1:19
13. "That Party" – 5:12
14. "Booker" – 6:26

=== Promo track listing ===
1. "(I Could Only) Whisper Your Name" – 4:50
2. "To Love the Language" – 5:01
3. "Here Comes the Big Parade" – 4:11
4. "She" – 5:36

== Personnel ==
- Harry Connick Jr. – vocals, piano
- Jonathan Dubose – guitar, background vocals
- Howard Kaplan – keyboards, background vocals
- George Porter Jr. – bass, background vocals
- David Russell Batiste Jr. – drums
- Michael Ward – percussion, background vocals
- Tony Hall – bass, background vocals
- Raymond Weber – drums, background vocals
- Joseph "Zigaboo" Modeliste – drums, background vocals
- Tracey Freeman – producer, vocals, clap
- Leroy Jones – trumpet
- Mark Mullins – trombone
- Alonzo Bowens – saxophone
- Ramsey McLean – recitation, partyman, vocals
- Gregg Rubin – recording and mix engineer, clap, vocals
- Fieldfines Samantha Rambardi – woolen squeak trinket

== Charts ==
=== Weekly charts ===
Chart (1994–1995)	Peak position
Australian Albums (ARIA)	3
New Zealand Albums (RMNZ)	2
Scottish Albums (OCC)	38
UK Albums (OCC)	21
UK Jazz & Blues Albums (OCC)	1
US Billboard 200	16

=== Year-end charts ===
Chart (1994)	Position
Australian Albums (ARIA)	23
Chart (1995)	Position
Australian Albums (ARIA)	43

== Certifications and sales ==
Region	Certification	Certified units/sales
Australia (ARIA)	2× Platinum	140,000^{^}
Canada (Music Canada)	Gold	50,000^{^}
France (SNEP)	Gold	100,000^{*}
New Zealand (RMNZ)	Platinum	15,000^{^}
United States (RIAA)	Platinum	1,000,000^{^}
^{*} Sales figures based on certification alone.^{^} Shipments figures based on certification alone.
