= Lofty's Roach Soufflé =

Studio album by Harry Connick Jr.
- Released: July 3, 1990
- Recorded: April 4, 5, and 22, 1990
- Studios: RCA, New York City
- Genres: Jazz, instrumental
- Length: 63:00
- Label: Columbia
- Producers: Tracey Freeman, George Butler

Harry Connick Jr. chronology
We Are in Love (1990)	Lofty's Roach Soufflé (1990)	Blue Light, Red Light (1991)

Lofty's Roach Soufflé is an instrumental album by American artist Harry Connick Jr., released in 1990.

Presented as the Harry Connick Jr. Trio:

- Harry Connick Jr. (piano)
- Benjamin Jonah Wolfe (bass)
- Shannon Powell (drums)

The album was released simultaneously as his big band album We Are in Love, and his home-video debut, entitled Singin' & Swingin'.

== Critical reception ==
Professional ratings
Review scores
Source	Rating
AllMusic	2.5/5 stars
Entertainment Weekly	C−

AllMusic's Scott Yanow believes Connick "shows some growth from his earlier days as a sort-of Thelonious Monk imitator, [but] he did not yet have a piano style of his own and none of his compositions are all that memorable."

Entertainment Weekly ranked the album as one of the worst of 1990, and also compares Connick to Monk, writing that he plays "in a style that's almost a carbon copy of the late (and much greater) Thelonious Monk. But the sudden pauses and knotty clusters of unexpected notes that were marks of Monk's greatness sound, in Connick’s hands, like mistakes."

Connick responded to the Monk comparisons saying, "A lot of people misinterpret this album and say it was a Monk thing. Duke Ellington was a bigger influence on this record than Monk was."

== Track listing ==
1. "One Last Pitch" (Harry Connick Jr., Joe Livingston) – 6:27
2. "Hudson Bommer" (Connick) – 5:13
3. "Lonely Side" (Connick) – 8:15
4. "Mr. Spill" (Connick) – 5:00
5. "Lofty's Roach Soufflé" (Connick) – 5:23
6. "Mary Ruth" (Connick) – 5:54
7. "Harronymous" (Connick) – 5:22
8. "One Last Pitch (Take Two)" (Connick, Livingston) – 3:26
9. "Colomby Day" (Connick) – 6:06
10. "Little Dancing Girl" (Connick) – 7:33
11. "Bayou Maharajah" (Connick) – 4:41

== Story of the album ==
Lofty's Roach Soufflé was inspired by Connick's experiences on the film Memphis Belle: "In case you're curious about the title 'Lofty's Roach Souffle', last summer I was in England filming Memphis Belle, which is a World War II movie about a B-17. The actors were sent to boot camp at an SAS training ground where we met Lofty. Lofty was introduced to us as the premier survivalist in the world and he showed us one survival tip after another. D. B. Sweeney, who played the navigator in the movie, and I became friends during the shoot. D.B. also happens to be a fine chef, and he quickly noticed that Lofty could make food out of almost anything. Lofty was the master of outdoor cuisine! D.B. figured that Lofty might even be able to make roach souffle. I wrote a song to remind me of this experience."

== Charts ==
- Top Jazz Albums: No. 4
- The Billboard 200: No. 94

== Awards and nominations ==
- 1990 Grammy nomination: Best Instrumental Composition, "One Last Pitch (Take 2)" – Harry Connick Jr. & Joe Livingston
