= Bourbon Street Parade =

Played by a naval band

"Bourbon Street Parade" is a popular jazz song written by drummer Paul Barbarin in 1949. The song is an example of how early marching bands influenced New Orleans jazz. It has become a Dixieland classic and New Orleans Jazz standard.

It is often performed as part of "Second line" parades in New Orleans. This song was originally performed by Paul Barbarin & His New Orleans Jazz Band. The melody of "Won't You Come Home Bill Bailey" can be played simultaneously with "Bourbon Street Parade" and makes a pleasing counterpoint.

From 1954 till the end of his career, "Bourbon Street Parade" was the signature song of every concert of the Chris Barber Jazz Band.

== Notable recordings ==
- Louis Armstrong
- Lucien Barbarin
- Chris Barber
- James Chirillo
- Harry Connick Jr
- Louis Cottrell, Jr
- Dukes of Dixieland
- Al Hirt
- The Hot Sardines
- Wynton Marsalis
- Preservation Hall Jazz Band
- Wilbur de Paris (recorded 1952)
