= When My Heart Finds Christmas =

Studio album by Harry Connick Jr.
- Released: October 26, 1993
- Recorded: July 16, 17, 19–23, 1993
- Studio: Capitol, Hollywood, California
- Genre: Christmas
- Length: 55:36
- Label: Columbia
- Producer: Tracey Freeman

Harry Connick Jr. chronology
25 (1992)	When My Heart Finds Christmas (1993)	She (1994)

Harry Connick Jr. Christmas albums chronology
When My Heart Finds Christmas (1993)	Harry for the Holidays (2003)

Professional ratings
Review scores
Source	Rating
Entertainment Weekly	A− 11/12/93, p.59

When My Heart Finds Christmas is American artist Harry Connick Jr.'s first Christmas album. Released in 1993, it is among the most popular holiday collections of the past three decades in the United States. Connick Jr composed four songs for the album: "When My Heart Finds Christmas", "(It Must've Been Ol') Santa Claus", "The Blessed Dawn Of Christmas Day" and "I Pray On Christmas". The other songs are traditional Christmas songs and carols.

The album proved to be the best-selling holiday album in the U.S. of 1993, selling 748,000 copies that year according to Nielsen SoundScan.

In December 2005, the album was certified Triple Platinum by the Recording Industry Association of America for shipment of three million copies in the U.S. As of November 2014, When My Heart Finds Christmas is the twelfth best-selling holiday album in the U.S. since May 1991 (the SoundScan era of music sales tracking), having sold 3.15 million.

== Track listing ==
1. "Sleigh Ride" (Leroy Anderson, Mitchell Parish) – 3:44
2. "When My Heart Finds Christmas" (Harry Connick Jr.) – 4:32
3. "(It Must've Been Ol') Santa Claus" (Connick) – 4:39
4. "The Blessed Dawn Of Christmas Day" (Connick) – 4:40
5. "Let It Snow! Let It Snow! Let It Snow!" (Sammy Cahn, Jule Styne) – 2:34
6. "The Little Drummer Boy" (Katherine K. Davis, Henry Onorati, Harry Simeone) – 3:41
7. "Ave Maria" (Franz Schubert, Sir Walter Scott) – 4:35
8. "Parade of the Wooden Soldiers" (Ballard Macdonald, Leon Jessel) – 3:27
9. "What Child Is This?" (William Dix, traditional) – 3:11
10. "Christmas Dreaming" (Irving Gordon, Lester Lee) – 2:40
11. "I Pray On Christmas" (Connick) – 3:48
12. "Rudolph the Red-Nosed Reindeer" (Johnny Marks) – 2:31
13. "O Holy Night" (Adolphe Adam, Placide Cappeau) – 6:45
14. "What Are You Doing New Year's Eve?" (Frank Loesser) – 4:49

== Personnel ==
=== Musicians ===
- Harry Connick Jr. - Vocals, piano
- Ben Wolfe - Bass
- Russell Malone - Guitar
- Arthur Latin II - Drums
- Howard Kaplan - Keyboards
- Brad Leali - Alto Saxophone
- Will Campbell - Alto Saxophone
- Jerry Weldon - Tenor Saxophone
- Ned Goold - Tenor Saxophone
- Dave Schumacher - Baritone saxophone
- Mark Mullins - Trombone
- Craig Klein - Trombone
- Lucien Barbarin - Trombone
- Joe Barati - Bass Trombone
- Roger Ingram - Trumpet
- Dan Miller - Trumpet
- Jeremy Davenport - Trumpet
- Louis Ford - Clarinet
- 70-piece orchestra
- 42-voice choir

=== Studio ===
- Tracey Freeman - Producer
- Gregg Rubin - Engineer/ Mixer

== Christmas TV Special ==
Harry Connick Jr., The Christmas Special (VHS) (1994)

Connick's hour-long CBS-TV Christmas special—recorded live at the Pantages Theatre and featuring Carol Burnett and Aaron Neville—was available on home video in time for Christmas 1994. The Harry Connick Jr. Christmas Special VHS (Sony 1994) features a set list similar to the album's track list.

=== Set list ===
- "Sleigh Ride"
- "Toyland"
- "I Pray On Christmas"
- "The Christmas Song" (with Aaron Neville)
- "Rudolph the Red-Nosed Reindeer"
- "(It Must've Been Ol') Santa Claus"
- "God Rest Ye Merry Gentlemen"
- "Away in a Manger"
- "The Blessed Dawn of Christmas Day"
- "I'll Be Home for Christmas"
- "All I Want for Christmas"
- "Parade of the Wooden Soldiers"
- "Jingle Bells"
- "What Are You Doing New Year's Eve?"
- "When My Heart Finds Christmas"

== Certifications ==
Region	Certification	Certified units/sales
Canada (Music Canada)	Gold	50,000^{^}
United States (RIAA)	3× Platinum	3,150,000
^{^} Shipments figures based on certification alone.
