= Star Turtle =

Studio album by Harry Connick Jr.
- Released: July 2, 1996
- Studios: Power Station Studio A, New York City; Sony Studio D, New York City
- Genres: Funk, psychedelic pop
- Length: 65:41
- Label: Sony/Columbia
- Producer: Tracey Freeman

Harry Connick Jr. chronology
She (1994)	Star Turtle (1996)	To See You (1997)

Star Turtle may also refer to Great A'Tuin.

Professional ratings
Review scores
Source	Rating
Q	(9/96, p. 110)

Star Turtle is an album by Harry Connick Jr., released in 1996, receiving a Gold Album Certification July 8, 2004. It is primarily a funk album but also features pop, Mardi Gras rhythms, ballads, and rock.

"City Beneath the Sea" describes unique New Orleans street scenes, and features a brief but notable piano solo.

"Hear Me in the Harmony" became an MTV hit. The song is a tribute to James Booker.

Four of the tracks, namely the four "Star Turtle" tracks, tell a tale of a giant space turtle coming to New Orleans, looking for music salvation. He is given a tour through the city and samples the musical diversity, visiting a funk club, a jazz club, and a street parade. These four tracks ("Star Turtle 1", 2, 3 & 4) are special; the first one is a wild arrangement of drums, horns, guitars and overdubbed, whispery voices. Connick plays every instrument and is the voice of every word heard on the four pieces.

== Track listing ==
All music and lyrics composed by Harry Connick Jr.

1. "Star Turtle" – 4:35
2. "How Do Y'all Know" – 4:55
3. "Hear Me in the Harmony" – 4:46
4. "Reason to Believe" – 4:50
5. "Just Like Me" – 4:46
6. "Star Turtle 2" – 2:27
7. "Little Farley" – 6:05
8. "Eyes of the Seeker" – 4:51
9. "Nobody Like You to Me" – 3:43
10. "Boozehound" – 5:14
11. "Star Turtle 3" – 2:10
12. "Never Young" – 5:26
13. "Mind on the Matter" – 4:09 – sung by Tony Hall (the bassist)
14. "City Beneath the Sea" – 5:59
15. "Star Turtle 4" – 1:45

The CD includes a CD-ROM multimedia presentation.

Target Bonus tracks

- "Voodoo Mama" – 7:12

== Musicians ==
- Harry Connick Jr. – vocals, piano
- Jonathan DuBose Jr. – guitar, vocals
- Howard Kaplan – keyboards
- Lucien Barbarin – trombone
- Tony Hall – bass, vocals
- Louis Ford – clarinet
- Raymond Weber – drums, percussion
- Ned Goold – tenor saxophone
- Jerry Weldon – tenor saxophone
- Dave Schumacher – baritone saxophone
- Jeremy Davenport – trumpet
- Dan Miller – trumpet
- John Allred – trombone, tuba
- Mark Mullins – trombone
- Tracey Freeman – producer
- Gregg Rubin – recording & mix engineer

== Charts ==
=== Weekly charts ===
Weekly chart performance for Star Turtle
Chart (1996)	Peak
Australian Albums (ARIA)	16
French Albums (SNEP)	38
New Zealand Albums (RMNZ)	18
US Billboard 200	38

=== Year-end charts ===
1996 year-end chart performance for Star Turtle
Chart (1996)	Rank
Australian Albums (ARIA)	100

== Certifications and sales ==
Region	Certification	Certified units/sales
United States (RIAA)	Gold	500,000^{^}
^{^} Shipments figures based on certification alone.
