= Harry Connick Jr. (album) =

Studio album by Harry Connick Jr.
- Released: November 17, 1987
- Recorded: January 12, 1987
- Genre: Jazz, instrumental
- Label: Columbia
- Producer: Delfeayo Marsalis

Harry Connick Jr. chronology
Pure Dixieland (1979)	Harry Connick Jr. (1987)	20 (1988)

Harry Connick Jr. is an eponymous instrumental album released in 1987. It is Harry Connick Jr.'s first album from Columbia Records. Like most of his other albums, it is dedicated to Harry's mother, Anita Connick, who died of ovarian cancer when he was 13. "Sunny Side Of The Street" is dedicated to James Booker, a singer and pianist who tutored Connick.

== Track listing ==
1. "Love Is Here to Stay" (George Gershwin, Ira Gershwin) 4:10
2. "Little Clown" (H. Connick Jr.) 5:50
3. "Zealousy" (H. Connick Jr.) 1:34
4. "Sunny Side Of The Street" (Dorothy Fields, Jimmy McHugh) 3:23
5. "I Mean You" (Thelonious Monk) 5:23
6. "Vocation" (H. Connick Jr.) 5:04
7. "On Green Dolphin Street" (Ned Washington, Bronisław Kaper) 5:00
8. "Little Waltz" (Ron Carter) 4:14
9. "E" (H. Connick Jr.) 4:05

== Musicians ==
- Harry Connick Jr. – Piano
- Ron Carter – Bass
- Reginald Veal – Bass on "E"
- Herlin Riley – Drums on "E"

== Certifications ==
Region	Certification	Certified units/sales
United States (RIAA)	Gold	500,000^{^}
^{^} Shipments figures based on certification alone.
