= When Harry Met Sally... (soundtrack) =

Soundtrack album by Harry Connick Jr.
- Released: July 1989
- Recorded: June 6, 12 & 19, 1989
- Studio: RCA, New York City
- Genre: Traditional pop
- Length: 38:00
- Label: Columbia
- Producer: Marc Shaiman, Harry Connick Jr.

Harry Connick Jr. chronology
20 (1988)	When Harry Met Sally... (1989)	We Are in Love (1990)

Professional ratings
Review scores
Source	Rating
Allmusic	4.5/5 stars

When Harry Met Sally... is the soundtrack to the 1989 film of the same name starring Billy Crystal and Meg Ryan. The songs are performed by pianist Harry Connick Jr., who won the Grammy Award for Best Jazz Male Vocal Performance.

== Background ==
Bobby Colomby, the drummer for Blood, Sweat & Tears and a friend of director Rob Reiner, recommended Harry Connick Jr. for the soundtrack. When Reiner listened to the tape Colomby gave him, he was struck by how Connick sounded like a young Frank Sinatra. The movie's soundtrack was released by Columbia Records in July 1989 and consists of standards performed by Connick with a big band and orchestra arranged by Marc Shaiman. Connick won his first Grammy Award for Best Jazz Male Vocal Performance.

Arrangements and orchestrations on "It Had to Be You", "Where or When", "I Could Write a Book" and "But Not for Me" are by Connick and Shaiman. Other songs were performed as piano and vocal solos or with Connick's trio with Ben Wolfe on double bass and Jeff "Tain" Watts on drums. Also appearing on the album are tenor saxophonist Frank Wess and guitarist Jay Berliner.

The album went to No. 1 on the jazz chart at Billboard magazine and reached the top 50 of the Top 200 Albums chart. Connick toured North America in support of this album. It was given double-platinum status.

== Track listing ==
1. "It Had to Be You" (Isham Jones, Gus Kahn)
2. "Love Is Here to Stay" (George Gershwin, Ira Gershwin)
3. "Stompin' at the Savoy" (Benny Goodman, Chick Webb, Edgar Sampson, Andy Razaf)
4. "But Not for Me" (G. Gershwin, I. Gershwin)
5. "Winter Wonderland" (Felix Bernard, Richard B. Smith)
6. "Don't Get Around Much Anymore" (Duke Ellington, Bob Russell)
7. "Autumn in New York" (Vernon Duke)
8. "I Could Write a Book" (Lorenz Hart, Richard Rodgers)
9. "Let's Call the Whole Thing Off" (G. Gershwin, I. Gershwin)
10. "It Had to Be You (Instrumental Trio)" (Jones, Kahn)
11. "Where or When" (Hart, Rodgers)

== Music in the film ==
The music on the soundtrack is performed by Connick, while the music in the film is by various artists:

- "It Had to Be You Instrumental Trio " (Isham Jones, Gus Kahn) – Harry Connick Jr. Trio
- "Our Love Is Here to Stay" (George Gershwin, Ira Gershwin) – Louis Armstrong and Ella Fitzgerald
- "Don't Pull Your Love" (Brian Potter, Dennis Lambert) – Hamilton, Joe Frank & Reynolds
- "Ramblin' Man" (Dickey Betts) – Allman Brothers Band
- "Right Time of the Night" (Peter McCann) – Jennifer Warnes
- "Let's Call the Whole Thing Off" (G. Gershwin, I. Gershwin) – Louis Armstrong and Ella Fitzgerald
- "Where or When" (Lorenz Hart, Richard Rodgers) – Ella Fitzgerald
- "Lady's Lunch" (Marc Shaiman)
- "The Tables Have Turned" (Laura Kenyon, Marc Shaiman, Scott Wittman)
- "But Not for Me" (G. Gershwin, I. Gershwin) – Harry Connick Jr.
- "Plane Cue and La Marseillaise" (Max Steiner) (from Casablanca (1942))
- "La Marseillaise" (Claude Joseph Rouget de Lisle)
- "Autumn in New York" (Vernon Duke) – Harry Connick Jr. Trio
- "Winter Wonderland" (Felix Bernard, Richard B. Smith) – Ray Charles
- "I Could Write a Book" (Hart, Rodgers) – Harry Connick Jr.
- "The Surrey with the Fringe on Top" (Rodgers, Oscar Hammerstein II) – Billy Crystal and Meg Ryan
- "Say It Isn't So" (Irving Berlin)
- "String Quartet No. 7 in E-flat major" (Wolfgang Amadeus Mozart)
- "Stompin' at the Savoy" (Benny Goodman, Chick Webb, Edgar Sampson, Andy Razaf) – Harry Connick Jr. Trio
- "Don't Be That Way" (Sampson, Goodman, Mitchell Parish)
- "Have Yourself a Merry Little Christmas" (Ralph Blane, Hugh Martin) – Bing Crosby
- "Call Me" (Tony Hatch) – Billy Crystal
- "Don't Get Around Much Anymore" (Duke Ellington, Bob Russell) – Harry Connick Jr.
- "Isn't It Romantic?" (Hart, Rodgers)
- "It Had to Be You" (Isham Jones, Gus Kahn) – Frank Sinatra
- "Auld Lang Syne" (Robert Burns) – Louis Armstrong

== Personnel ==
- Jay Berliner - acoustic guitar
- Harry Connick Jr. - vocals, piano, producer, arranger, editing, mixing
- Dennis Ferrante - assistant engineer, engineer
- David Gahr - photography
- Tim Geelan - engineer, mixing, mixing engineer
- Marc Shaiman - piano, orchestration, producer, arranger, editing, mixing
- Jef Stott, Ann Marie Wilkins - assistant producer, production assistant
- Jeff "Tain" Watts - drums
- Frank Wess - tenor saxophone
- Ben Wolfe - bass

== Charts ==
Chart (1990)	Peak position
Australian Albums (ARIA Charts)	97

== Certifications ==
Region	Certification	Certified units/sales
Canada (Music Canada)	Gold	50,000^{^}
United States (RIAA)	2× Platinum	2,000,000^{^}
^{^} Shipments figures based on certification alone.
