= Songs I Heard =

Studio album by Harry Connick Jr.
- Released: October 23, 2001
- Recorded: July 23–26, 2001
- Studios: Manhattan Center Studios, New York City
- Genre: Vocal jazz
- Length: 58:18
- Label: Columbia
- Producer: Tracey Freeman

Harry Connick Jr. chronology
30 (2001)	Songs I Heard (2001)	Thou Shalt Not (2002)

Professional ratings
Review scores
Source	Rating
AllMusic	link

Songs I Heard (2001) is an album by Harry Connick Jr. covering songs from movies he watched as a child. The album features songs from Annie, The Sound of Music, Willy Wonka & the Chocolate Factory, Mary Poppins, and The Wizard of Oz. The album is arranged, orchestrated and conducted by Harry Connick Jr.

Winner of the 2002 Grammy Award for Best Traditional Pop Vocal Album, Songs I Heard was released on the same date as his album 30.

== Background ==
Harry Connick, Jr. transforms songs from classic childhood films into big band songs. He called the album "a fun record, but it's definitely for adults."

In a 2003 interview, Connick compared getting children to appreciate music with getting them to appreciate broccoli. "If you give a kid fast food every day, that's all they'll be open to," said Connick. "If you give them broccoli, they may not like it, but they'll know it is out there and be open to it. You have to expose kids to music – jazz, classical music, rock and roll – and they'll be open."

== Track listing ==
No.	Title	Writer(s)	From movie	Length
1.	"Supercalifragilisticexpialidocious"	Richard M. Sherman, Robert B. Sherman	Mary Poppins	4:29
2.	"The Lonely Goatherd"	Richard Rodgers, Oscar Hammerstein II	The Sound of Music	3:20
3.	"Ding-Dong! The Witch Is Dead"	Harold Arlen, E.Y. "Yip" Harburg	The Wizard of Oz	2:07
4.	"Maybe"	Martin Charnin, Charles Strouse	Annie	3:49
5.	"Pure Imagination/Candy Man"	Leslie Bricusse, Anthony Newley	Willy Wonka & the Chocolate Factory	4:21
6.	"Golden Ticket"/"I Want It Now"	Bricusse, Newley	Willy Wonka & the Chocolate Factory	3:50
7.	"Oompa Loompa"	Bricusse, Newley	Willy Wonka & the Chocolate Factory	3:46
8.	""A Spoonful of Sugar"	R. M. Sherman, R. B. Sherman	Mary Poppins	5:14
9.	"Stay Awake"	R. M. Sherman, R. B. Sherman	Mary Poppins	2:41
10.	"Something Was Missing"	Charnin, Strouse	Annie	4:16
11.	"You're Never Fully Dressed Without a Smile"	Charnin, Strouse	Annie	2:57
12.	"Over The Rainbow"	Arlen, Harburg	The Wizard of Oz	4:15
13.	"The Jitterbug"	Arlen, Harburg	The Wizard of Oz	3:40
14.	"Merry Old Land of Oz"	Arlen, Harburg	The Wizard of Oz	2:51
15.	"Edelweiss"	Rodgers, Hammerstein	The Sound of Music	2:27
16.	"Do-Re-Mi"	Rodgers, Hammerstein	The Sound of Music	4:15
Total length:				58:18

== Musicians ==
- Harry Connick, Jr. – vocals, piano

== Awards ==
- 2001 Grammy Award winner – Best Traditional Pop Vocal Album
  - Harry Connick Jr. (artist)
  - Gregg Rubin (engineer)
  - Tracey Freeman (producer)

== Charts ==
Chart (2001)	Peak position
US Billboard 200	88
US Billboard Top Jazz Albums	2
