= Harry on Broadway, Act I =

Cast recording by Broadway cast / Harry Connick Jr. & Kelli O'Hara
- Released: May 9, 2006
- Recorded: March 6–7, 9–10, 2006 (CD1), March 17, 2006 (CD2)
- Studio: Avatar, New York City; Right Track, New York City
- Genre: Cast album
- Length: 65:12 (CD1); 44:49 (CD2); 110:01 (Total)
- Label: Columbia (US)
- Producer: Tracey Freeman (Both CD's), Harry Connick Jr. (CD1)

Harry Connick Jr. chronology
| Occasion : Connick on Piano, Volume 2 (2005) | Harry on Broadway, Act I (2006) | Chanson du Vieux Carre (2007) |

Harry on Broadway, Act I, is a two-disc set recorded in 2006. The first disc contains the cast recording from The Pajama Game (2006), and disc two is a selection of new recordings from Thou Shalt Not (2001), now with Harry Connick Jr. featuring Kelli O'Hara.

Professional ratings
Review scores
| Source | Rating |
|---|---|
| Allmusic | link |

== Track listing ==
=== Disc one: The Pajama Game ===
The Cast Album

1. "Overture"
2. "Racing with the Clock" – Ensemble
3. "A New Town Is a Blue Town" – Harry Connick Jr.
4. "I'm Not at All in Love" – Kelli O'Hara and Ensemble
5. "I'll Never Be Jealous Again" – Michael McKean, Roz Ryan
6. "Hey There" – Harry Connick Jr.
7. "Sleep Tite" – Devin Richards, Paula Leggett Chase, Kate Chapman, Michael Halling
8. "Her Is" – Peter Benson, Megan Lawrence
9. "Once a Year Day" – Harry Connick Jr., Kelli O'Hara and Company
10. "Once a Year Day Playoff"
11. "Her Is" – Peter Benson, Joyce Chittick
12. "Small Talk" – Harry Connick Jr., Kelli O'Hara
13. "There Once Was a Man" – Harry Connick Jr., Kelli O'Hara
14. "Factory Music/Slow Down" – Ensemble
15. "Hey There" – Harry Connick Jr.
16. "Steam Heat" – Joyce Chittick, David Eggers, Vince Pesce
17. "The World Around Us" – Harry Connick Jr.
18. "Hey There Reprise/If You Win You Lose" – Harry Connick Jr., Kelli O'Hara
19. "Think of the Time I Save" – Michael McKean and Ensemble
20. "Hernando's Hideaway" – Megan Lawrence, Harry Connick Jr. and Company
21. "The Three of Us" – Michael McKean, Megan Lawrence
22. "Seven-and-a-Half Cents" – Kelli O'Hara, Peter Benson and Ensemble
23. "There Once Was a Man" – Harry Connick. Jr, Kelli O'Hara
24. "Hernando's Jive"
25. "The Pajama Game" – Full Company

Songs from Thou Shalt Not (2006). Music & lyrics by Harry Connick Jr.

=== Disc two: Songs from Thou Shalt Not ===
Harry Connick Jr. featuring Kelli O'Hara

1. "Oh, My Dear (Something's Gone Wrong)" – Harry Connick Jr.
2. "Can't We Tell" – Harry Connick Jr., Kelli O'Hara
3. "Such Love" – Harry Connick Jr.
4. "I Like Love More" – Harry Connick Jr., Kelli O'Hara
5. "My Little World" – Kelli O'Hara
6. "All Things" – Harry Connick Jr.
7. "I Need to Be in Love" – Kelli O'Hara
8. "Oh! Ain't That Sweet" – Harry Connick Jr.
9. "The Other Hours" – Kelli O'Hara
10. "Take Advantage" – Harry Connick Jr.
11. "Take Her to the Mardi Gras" – Harry Connick Jr.

== Barnes & Noble Exclusive ==
=== Disc Three ===
The Barnes & Noble exclusive edition adds a bonus third disc featuring two additional tracks:

- "There Once Was a Man" – Harry Connick Jr., Kelli O'Hara
- "Steam Heat" – Harry Connick Jr., Kelli O'Hara

== Musicians ==
Disc one
The Pajama Game
The Cast Album

- Harry Connick Jr. – vocals (as Sid Sorokin)
- Kelli O'Hara – vocals (as Babe Williams)
- Michael McKean – vocals (as Hines)
- Richard Poe – vocals (as Mr. Hasler)
- Megan Lawrence – vocals (as Gladys)
- Joyce Chittick – vocals (as Mae)
- Roz Ryan – vocals (as Mabel)
- Michael McCormick – vocals (as Ganzenlicker/Pop)
- Devin Richards – vocals (ensemble)
- Rob Berman – conductor
- Chris Fenwick – associate conductor
- Marilyn Reynolds – violin
- Beth Sturdevant – cello
- Steve Kenyon – reeds
- John Winder – reeds
- Roger Ingram – trumpet
- Christian Jaudes – trumpet
- John Allred – trombone
- Joe Barati – bass trombone
- Jim Hershman – guitar
- Chris Fenwick – piano
- Neal Caine – bass
- Paul Pizutti – drums
- The Honolulu Heartbreakers – vocals
- Andy Barrett – synthesizer programmer
- Seymour "Red" Press – musical coordinator

Disc two
Songs from Thou Shalt Not
Harry Connick Jr. featuring Kelli O'Hara

- Harry Connick Jr. – piano, vocals
- Kelli O'Hara – vocals
- Charles "Ned" Goold – tenor saxophone
- Jonathan DuBose, Jr. – guitar, vocals
- Neal Caine – bass
- Jonathan Batiste – keyboards, vocals
- Arthur Latin II – drums
- Marilyn Reynolds – violin (concertmaster)
- Sylvia D'Avanzo – violin
- Maura Giannini – violin
- Suzanne Ornstein – violin
- Belinda Whitney – violin
- Dale P. Woodiel – violin
- Eugene Moye – cello
- Beth Sturdevant – cello
- Aija Silina – violin
- Crystal Garner – viola
- Jill Jaffe – viola
- Sally Shumway – viola
- The Honolulu Heartbreakers – vocals
- Rob Berman – conductor
- Seymour "Red" Press – contractor
- Geoff Burke – music preparation, copyist

The Pajama Game (2006). Music & lyrics by Richard Adler, Jerry Ross

== Charts ==
- 2006 Top Cast Album: #1
- 2006 Billboard 200: #97

== Awards ==
- 2007 Grammy Award nomination for "The Pajama Game" cast album (CD1): Best Musical Show Album – Harry Connick Jr. and Tracey Freeman, producers (Richard Adler and Jerry Ross, composers/lyricists) (New Broadway Cast with Harry Connick Jr., Kelli O'Hara and Others)
