= 25 (Harry Connick Jr. album) =

Studio album by Harry Connick Jr.
- Released: November 24, 1992
- Recorded: October 2–4, 6, 9, 1992
- Studio: BMG Studio A (New York City)
- Length: 65:48
- Label: Sony/Columbia
- Producer: Tracey Freeman

Harry Connick Jr. chronology
Blue Light, Red Light (1991)	25 (1992)	When My Heart Finds Christmas (1993)

Professional ratings
Review scores
Source	Rating
AllMusic	2.5/5 stars
Entertainment Weekly	B+

25 is an album by Harry Connick Jr., released on November 24, 1992. It is a collection of jazz and pop standards performed on solo piano. The title refers to his age at the time he recorded it.

== Track listing ==
1. "Stardust" (Hoagy Carmichael, Mitchell Parish) – (with Ellis Marsalis)
2. "Music, Maestro, Please" (Herbert Magidson, Allie Wrubel)
3. "On The Street Where You Live" (Alan Jay Lerner, Frederick Loewe)
4. "After You've Gone" (Henry Creamer, Turner Layton)
5. "I'm An Old Cowhand (From The Rio Grande)" (Johnny Mercer)
6. "Moment's Notice" (John Coltrane)
7. "Tangerine" (Johnny Mercer, Victor Schertzinger)
8. "Didn't He Ramble" (Harry Bolton)
9. "Caravan" (Duke Ellington, Irving Mills, Juan Tizol)
10. "Lazybones" (Hoagy Carmichael, Johnny Mercer) – (with Johnny Adams)
11. "Muskrat Ramble" (Ray Gilbert, Kid Ory)
12. "This Time the Dream's on Me" (Harold Arlen, Johnny Mercer)
13. "On the Atchison, Topeka and the Santa Fe" (Johnny Mercer, Harry Warren) – (with Ray Brown and Ned Goold)

== Musicians ==
- Harry Connick Jr. – piano, Hammond organ (track #10), vocals
- Ellis Marsalis – piano (track #1)
- Johnny Adams – vocals (track #10)
- Ned Goold – tenor sax (track #13)
- Ray Brown – bass (track #13)

== Certifications ==
Region	Certification	Certified units/sales
Canada (Music Canada)	Gold	50,000^{^}
United States (RIAA)	Platinum	1,000,000^{^}
^{^} Shipments figures based on certification alone.
