= We Are in Love =

Studio album by Harry Connick Jr.
- Released: July 3, 1990
- Recorded: April 4, 5, and 22, 1990
- Studio: RCA, New York City
- Genre: Jazz/big band
- Length: 52:05
- Label: Sony/Columbia
- Producer: Harry Connick Jr., Marc Shaiman, George Butler, Bobby Colomby

Harry Connick Jr. chronology
When Harry Met Sally... (1989)	We Are in Love (1990)	Lofty's Roach Souffle (1990)

We Are in Love is the sixth studio album by American musician and actor Harry Connick Jr., released on July 3, 1990 by Columbia Records. A traditional jazz album with swing influences, it features Connick on piano and vocal, Russell Malone on guitar, Shannon Powell on drums, Benjamin Jonah Wolfe on double bass, and Branford Marsalis on saxophone.

Although the album received a mixed critical response, it was a commercial success, topping the Billboard jazz charts and selling over two million records. It also entered the top ten in the UK Albums Chart.

== Release and promotion ==
The album was released alongside Connick's trio instrumental album, Lofty's Roach Soufflé, on 3 July 1990 via Columbia Records. It was supported by an accompanying long-form music video released the same day as well as a nationwide tour.

In Japan, the album received heavy airplay by J-WAVE and was promoted via commercials for Suntory whiskey.

== Critical reception ==
Professional ratings
Review scores
Source	Rating
AllMusic	3.5/5 stars
Entertainment Weekly	B−
Los Angeles Times	3/5 stars

David Vonke of the Toledo Blade praised the album, calling Connick a "dapper beanpole crooner, a la Frank Sinatra" and the album "a throwback to the 1940s", while noting that the album was "convincing with its "moody, romantic lyrics". The New York Times called it "an impressive vocal album of old-style popular songs, many of them composed by Connick". Cathleen McGuigan, writing for Newsweek, called the album "terrific", noting that the songs written by Connick were "new songs that sound old". Zan Stewart of the Los Angeles Times called the vocals a "dusky, part-Sinatra, part-Torme tenor", stating that Connick "may not have Ol’ Blues Eyes’ magic pipes, but he can handle a tune, and with pretty good feeling, too". Melinda Newman of Billboard called it a "big band vocal album, more in line with music heard on the previous soundtrack".

Gary Giddins, writing for Entertainment Weekly, called the album's vocals "an airy wisp, all charm and no substance, except maybe in its lowest range, where it unfolds in a throaty purr", although he praised the songwriting. Ken Franckling of United Press International criticized the vocals, calling them at best "passable", but praised the work of the orchestra. Jazz critic Scott Yanow, writing for AllMusic, reviewed it favorably, stating that Connick's vocals, "while limited, are personable". Additionally, he positively rated the covers of "A Nightingale Sang in Berkeley Square" and "It's Alright with Me", calling them high points. Dave McElfrish of the Phoenix New Times stated that Connick did not deserve "to be hailed as big-band’s savior", criticizing the production and the album's focus, stating that "his often attractive writing is smothered beneath garish production" and noting that it "sounds more nostalgic than original".

=== Accolades ===
During the 33rd Annual Grammy Awards, the album won the Grammy for Best Jazz Vocal Performance, Male. To celebrate, the title track was performed live on the Grammy telecast.

== Commercial performance ==
In Japan, the album was a commercial success, selling over 50,000 units by October 1991. It eventually sold over 100,000 copies in the nation, being certified Gold by the Recording Industry Association of Japan in 1993.

== Track listing ==
No.	Title	Writer(s)	Length
1.	"We Are in Love"	Harry Connick, Jr.	2:40
2.	"Only 'Cause I Don't Have You"	Harry Connick, Jr.; Ramsey McLean	4:22
3.	"Recipe for Love"	Harry Connick, Jr.	2:34
4.	"Drifting"	Marc Shaiman	5:14
5.	"Forever, for Now"	Harry Connick, Jr.; Ramsey McLean	4:20
6.	"A Nightingale Sang in Berkeley Square"	Eric Maschwitz; Manning Sherwin	5:09
7.	"Heavenly"	Harry Connick, Jr.; Ramsey McLean	1:59
8.	"Just a Boy"	Harry Connick, Jr.; Ramsey McLean	6:05
9.	"I've Got a Great Idea"	Harry Connick, Jr.	4:21
10.	"I'll Dream of You Again"	Harry Connick, Jr.	3:33
11.	"It's All Right with Me"	Cole Porter	4:53
12.	"Buried in Blue"	Harry Connick, Jr.; Ramsey McLean	6:55
Total length:			52:05

== Personnel ==
- Harry Connick Jr. – piano, vocals
- Branford Marsalis – tenor sax, soprano sax
- Russell Malone – guitar
- Benjamin Jonah Wolfe – bass
- Shannon Powell – drums

== Charts ==
=== Weekly charts ===
Chart (1990–1992)	Peak position
Canadian Albums (RPM)	120
UK Albums (Official Charts)	7
US Billboard 200	28
US Traditional Jazz Albums (Billboard)	1

=== Year-end charts ===
Chart (1991)	Peak position
Top-Selling Jazz Albums (Billboard)	1

== Certification and sales ==
Certifications for We Are in Love
Region	Certification	Certified units/sales
Canada (Music Canada)	Platinum	100,000^{^}
Japan (RIAJ)	Gold	100,000^{^}
United Kingdom (BPI)	Gold	100,000^{^}
United States (RIAA)	2× Platinum	2,000,000^{^}
^{^} Shipments figures based on certification alone.
