= Blue Light, Red Light =

Studio album by Harry Connick Jr.
- Released: September 23, 1991
- Recorded: June 27–28; July 2–4 and 14, 1991
- Studio: BMG Studio A (New York City)
- Genre: Big Band
- Length: 58:44
- Label: Sony/Columbia
- Producer: Tracey Freeman

Harry Connick Jr. chronology
Lofty's Roach Souffle (1990)	Blue Light, Red Light (1991)	25 (1992)

Professional ratings
Review scores
Source	Rating
AllMusic	2/5 stars

Blue Light, Red Light, a big band album by American artist Harry Connick Jr., released in 1991. The multi-platinum album features Connick's vocals and piano, accompanied by his 14-piece big band.

Connick wrote the music, with Ramsey McLean writing most of the lyrics, (except for track #4 "Jill", #5 "He Is They Are", #10 "She Belongs To Me", and #12 "Just Kiss Me", with both music and lyrics by Harry Connick Jr.).

== Track listing ==
1. "Blue Light, Red Light (Someone's There)" (Harry Connick Jr, Ramsey McLean) – 3:31
2. "A Blessing And A Curse" (Connick, McLean) – 3:06
3. "You Didn't Know Me When" (Connick, McLean) – 3:13
4. "Jill" (Connick) – 6:13
5. "He Is They Are" (Connick) – 4:15
6. "With Imagination (I'll Get There)" (Connick, McLean) – 5:01
7. "If I Could Give You More" (Connick, McLean) – 4:49
8. "The Last Payday" (Connick, McLean) – 7:16
9. "It's Time" (Connick, McLean) – 6:38
10. "She Belongs To Me" (Connick) – 3:57
11. "Sonny Cried" (Connick, McLean) – 5:46
12. "Just Kiss Me" (Connick) – 4:53

== Promo track listing ==
1. "Blue Light, Red Light" – 3:30
2. "Sonny Cried" – 5:44

== Musicians ==
- Harry Connick Jr. – piano, vocals
- Brad Leali – alto sax
- Will Campbell – alto sax
- Jerry Weldon – tenor sax
- Ned Goold – tenor sax
- David Schumacher – bari sax, bass clarinet, flute
- Louis Ford – clarinet
- Mark Mullins – trombone
- Craig Klein – trombone
- Lucien Barbarin – trombone, sousaphone
- Joe Barati – bass trombone
- Roger Ingram – trumpet
- Dan Miller – trumpet
- Leroy Jones – trumpet
- Jeremy Davenport – trumpet
- Russell Malone – guitar
- Benjamin Jonah Wolfe – bass
- Shannon Powell – drums
- Tracey Freeman – producer
- Gregg Rubin – engineer/mixer

== Billboard Album Chart ==
- 1991 Blue Light, Red Light debuted at No. 1 on the jazz chart
- 1992 Blue Light, Red Light had its peak position on the Billboard 200 as No. 17 on February 29.

== Awards and nominations ==
- 1992 Grammy Award nomination: Best Traditional Pop Performance -- Blue Light, Red Light
- 1992 Grammy Award nomination: Best Instrumental Arrangement w/ Vocals -- "Blue Light, Red Light (Someone's There)"
- 1992 Soul Train Music Award nomination: Best Jazz Album

== Certifications ==
Region	Certification	Certified units/sales
Australia (ARIA)	Gold	35,000^{^}
Canada (Music Canada)	Platinum	100,000^{^}
France (SNEP)	Gold	100,000^{*}
United Kingdom (BPI)	Gold	100,000^{^}
United States (RIAA)	2× Platinum	2,000,000^{^}
^{*} Sales figures based on certification alone.^{^} Shipments figures based on certification alone.
