= (Up A) Lazy River =

Jazz and pop standard by Sidney Arodin and Hoagy Carmichael

Song by Louis Armstrong
- Published: 1931
- Genre: Jazz, pop standard
- Songwriter: Hoagy Carmichael
- Composers: Hoagy Carmichael, Sidney Arodin

"(Up A) Lazy River" is a popular tune and song by Hoagy Carmichael and Sidney Arodin, published in 1931. The melody is by Arodin, arranged and with words modified by Carmichael. It is considered a jazz and pop standard, and has been recorded by many artists.

== Charting versions ==
- Bobby Darin (1961) No. 14 hit on the Hot 100, No. 16 Canada
- Si Zentner and his orchestra (1961) No. 19 CAN

== See also ==
- List of 1930s jazz standards
