= Thou Shalt Not (musical) =

- Poster from the production
- Music: Harry Connick Jr.
- Lyrics: Harry Connick Jr.
- Book: David Thompson
- Basis: Thérèse Raquin by Émile Zola
- Productions: 2001 Broadway

Thou Shalt Not is a musical based on Émile Zola's 1867 novel Thérèse Raquin with music and lyrics by Harry Connick Jr. and an adapted book by David Thompson. The musical deals with the consequences involved in the breaking of several Commandments, in particular the sixth and seventh. It ran on Broadway in 2001.

== Production ==
After 22 previews which had been delayed a week due to the September 11, 2001 attacks, the musical opened at the Plymouth Theatre on October 25, 2001. It ran until January 6, 2002 with 85 performances. It received largely negative reviews. "Simultaneously glorious and fatally flawed, this is one Broadway failure that belongs on everybody's must-see list." The Hamilton Spectator deemed it "a fabulous failure."

Under the direction of Susan Stroman, the creative team included Thomas Lynch's scenic design, William Ivey Long's costumes, Scott Lehrer's sound design, and Peter Kaczorowski's lighting design. The cast starred Craig Bierko (Laurent LeClaire), Norbert Leo Butz (Camille Raquin), Debra Monk, and Kate Levering (Therese).

== Plot ==
The jazz pianist Laurent LeClaire returns to New Orleans from World War II and runs into his old friend Camille Raquin who is a frail man with an overprotective mother. Camille is married to his own cousin, Therese. Laurent falls in love with Therese, they become lovers, and conspire to kill her husband. Laurent murders Camille, who is pushed over the side of a rowboat. The news of his death sends Camille's mourning mother into a crippling stroke. After waiting a year, Laurent marries his friend's widow, but every time he tries to touch her, the ghost of Camille appears and drives them apart. In time, Therese is driven into madness and suicide, and Laurent kills himself.

== Musical numbers ==
Act I

- It's Good To Be Home – Flim Flam, Papa Jack & Ensemble
- I Need To Be In Love Ballet – Therese
- My Little World – Madame Raquin
- While You're Young – Laurent
- I Need To Be In Love – Therese
- The Other Hours – Laurent
- The Other Hours (Ballet) – Laurent & Therese
- All Things – Camille
- Sovereign Lover – Therese, Laurent & Ensemble
- I've Got My Eye On You – Madame Raquin & Camille
- Light The Way – Ensemble
- Take Her To The Mardi Gras – Laurent, Camille, Therese & Ensemble
- Tug Boat – Camille & Therese

Act II

- Tug Boat (Reprise) – Laurent
- My Little World (Reprise) – Madame Raquin
- Won't You Sanctify – Sam & Ensemble
- Time Passing – Therese, Laurent, Madame Raquin & Ensemble
- Take Advantage – Officer Michaud
- Oh! Ain't That Sweet – Camille
- Thou Shalt Not (Ballet) – Therese, Laurent & Ensemble
- I Like Love More – Laurent, Therese
- It's Good To Be Home (Reprise) – Camille

== Comparison to source material ==
Stroman's late husband, Mike Ockrent, had asked his employees to recommend material to be adapted into musicals during his two-year production deal at Warner Bros. His assistant recommended the Zola novel, and began developing the idea in detail with the production executive. Later, when Warner Bros. passed on this, the idea and notes that were developed by Ockrent staff members were given to Stroman. Her original impulse was to make it into a ballet, but decided against it, and felt it could be strong enough as a musical. The idea for the musical Contact had also originally been developed at Ockrent's Warner Bros. office by the same two staff members, and then also offered over to Stroman by Ockrent when it didn't fly with the film studio.

Zola's novel from Paris in the 19th century, is updated to 1946-47 New Orleans in the 9th Ward, outside of the French Quarter. David Thompson explains: "New Orleans is sort of a natural cousin to Paris, in some ways. Not in all ways, but culturally... We were looking for a way for this piece to have an American sensibility to it, while retaining some of the European flavor, which New Orleans has. And the other thing that was important was to find a reason to have music a part of the story."

While Zola set much of his novel in the "dark, low, shallow" building in which the Raquins live and tend their haberdashery on the Pont-Neuf, the musical was set to a lively jazz tavern in the French Quarter run by Mme. Raquin.

== Cast ==
The original Broadway cast of 25 included the following:

- Craig Bierko – Laurent LeClaire
- Leo Burmester – Officer Michaud
- Norbert Leo Butz – Camille Raquin
- Kate Levering – Thérèse Raquin
- Debra Monk – Madame Raquin

Craig Bierko Craig Bierko ruptured one of his vocal cords on opening night, October 25, when he was accidentally hit in the larynx during a fight scene. "He finished the show and went to the opening night party," spokesman Philip Rinaldi said at the time, "but the next day he was hemorrhaging and had to be brought to the hospital. It was just a freak thing that happened." The staging of the fight scene was not altered. Standby David New took over his part from the next day, and Bierko was reported as being out with "vocal problems". After two and a half weeks of vocal rest, Craig Bierko again took the stage on Nov. 13.

Kate Levering Shortly after Bierko's return, Kate Levering sprained an ankle and was away for a few performances.

After several workshops of the show with co-star Craig Bierko, including a topless scene, Levering said: "It's a very physically draining show. The dance stuff in Thou Shalt Not is very physical. There's a lot of fighting. There's a big love ballet on this bed and kind of a rape scene. Every day that we did that workshop, I left with bruises."

Kate Levering had previously co-starred with Craig Bierko in the show The Music Man (reported in some articles as being "very close friends" at the time).

Norbert Leo Butz Norbert Leo Butz, as the murdered husband, received a Tony nomination for Best Featured Actor in a Musical, and a Drama Desk Award nomination for Outstanding Featured Actor in a Musical.

== September 11, 2001 attacks ==
The previews started on September 27, 2001, only a little over two weeks after the September 11, 2001 attack on the World Trade Center in New York (the original start date was Sept. 20.). (Harry Connick's birthday, coincidentally, is September 11.) In early previews there were audience complaints about a morgue scene, which seemed tasteless to some in the light of the Sept. 11 attacks. The scene remained in a tamer revised version.

== Response ==
Ben Brantley, in his review for The New York Times, wrote, "It takes a singing dead man to bring a spark of life to Thou Shalt Not." The Village Voice wrote, "Unlike Zola's sexually depressed characters, everyone in the Broadway version seems to be getting it in spades...Dramatically, the bubblier context of David Thompson's book raises more questions that it cares to answer...songs that neither advance the plot nor illuminate the characters' secret logic." Clive Barnes wrote that the musical keeps "quite faithfully to the outline and even the spirit of the original novel – which Zola himself later transposed into a play for Sarah Bernhardt – they have not only short-changed the essential drama but also failed to come up with a memorable musical." However, the music received some praise. As Steven Suskin wrote about the cast album in Playbill, "Connick's score is quirky but whimsical, and totally respectable; I have heard far less interesting scores in far more successful shows."

== Recording ==
A 77-minute original cast recording of the Tony nominated score was released on June 18, 2002.

== Awards and nominations ==
=== Original Broadway production ===
Year	Award Ceremony	Category	Nominee	Result
2002	Drama Desk Award	Outstanding Featured Actor in a Musical	Norbert Leo Butz	Nominated
2002	Tony Award	Best Original Score	Harry Connick Jr.	Nominated
2002	Tony Award	Best Performance by a Featured Actor in a Musical	Norbert Leo Butz	Nominated
