= My New Orleans Tour =

2007–08 concert tour by Harry Connick Jr.

- Tour by Harry Connick Jr.
- Concert poster, April 5 at The Orpheum Theatre, Minneapolis, Minnesota, as part of the My New Orleans Tour
- Start date: February 23, 2007
- End date: March 20, 2008
- Legs: 4
- No. of shows: 74 in North America; 17 in Europe; 10 in South East Asia; 5 in Australia; 106 in total

Harry Connick Jr. concert chronology
- My New Orleans Tour (2007–2008); A Holiday Celebration Tour (2008)

The My New Orleans Tour was a 2007 concert tour by American singer, pianist, and actor Harry Connick Jr. backed by his big band. The tour promoted his albums Oh, My NOLA (My New Orleans) and Chanson du Vieux Carré. The first concert of the tour was on February 23, 2007 at the Mizner Park Amphitheatre in Boca Raton, Florida. The first part of the tour took place in the USA and Canada. The second part of the tour was in Europe, and in 2008 the tour came to Asia and Australia.

One of the dates was the closing act at the New Orleans Jazz & Heritage Festival, on May 6, 2007. Connick was also supposed to be part of a concert with clarinetist Alvin Batiste at the same festival, called "Marsalis Music honors Alvin Batiste & Bob French". However, Batiste died of an apparent heart attack only hours before he was to perform. The concert, that also included Branford Marsalis and Bob French, went on as planned, in memory of Alvin Batiste.

At the Montreal Jazz Festival, on June 30, 2007, Connick received the Ella Fitzgerald Award, "in recognition of the versatility, improvisational originality and quality of repertoire of a jazz singer renowned on the international scene."

For the March 9, 2008 concert in Shanghai, China, an old set list had mistakenly been given to Chinese authorities when applying for permits to play in China. An hour before the concert, authorities showed up, and the old set list was found to contain songs that were considered inappropriate to perform, and a number of "safe" songs were added. Connick & co. revised the set list with current songs, but did not get approval. Connick's big band did not have the charts for the permitted songs on the old set list, so they often remained quiet through the concert. Connick issued a statement four days later, saying "Due to circumstances beyond my control, I was not able to give my fans in China the show I intended." The issue that China had with Connick's setlist, was likely to stem from a March 2 concert with Björk, who dedicated a song to Tibet at the end of her performance. (See Björk: "Declare Independence" live dedications)

== Personnel ==
=== Band ===
- vocals, piano: Harry Connick Jr.
- Trombone: Lucien Barbarin, Joe Barati, Jeff Bush, Dion Tucker
- Trumpet: Roger Ingram, Derrick Gardner, Mark Braud, Leroy Jones, Bijon Watson
- Bass: Neal Caine
- Alto saxophone: Charles "Ned" Goold
- Baritone saxophone: David Schumacher
- Tenor saxophone: Jerry Weldon
- drums: Arthur Latin

Band member Dion Tucker proposed to his girlfriend, on stage during the concert on April 21, 2007, in Radio City Music Hall, in New York City.

== Setlist (incomplete) ==
There are variations from concert to concert, and also a number of songs not named here, have been performed.

Songs performed most regularly, or quite often

- instrumental medley of classic tunes and Connick originals
- "Come By Me" (from his 1999 album Come By Me)
- "Let Them Talk" (from his 2007 album Oh, My NOLA)
- "Working In The Coal Mine" (from Oh, My NOLA)
- "Jambalaya (On The Bayou)" (from Oh, My NOLA)
- "Hello Dolly" (from Oh, My NOLA)
- "Won't You Come Home, Bill Bailey?" (from Oh, My NOLA)
- "All These People" (from Oh, My NOLA)
- "Yes We Can" (from Oh, My NOLA)
- "Basin Street Blues" (from his 1988 album 20)
- "Didn't He Ramble" (from his 1992 album 25)

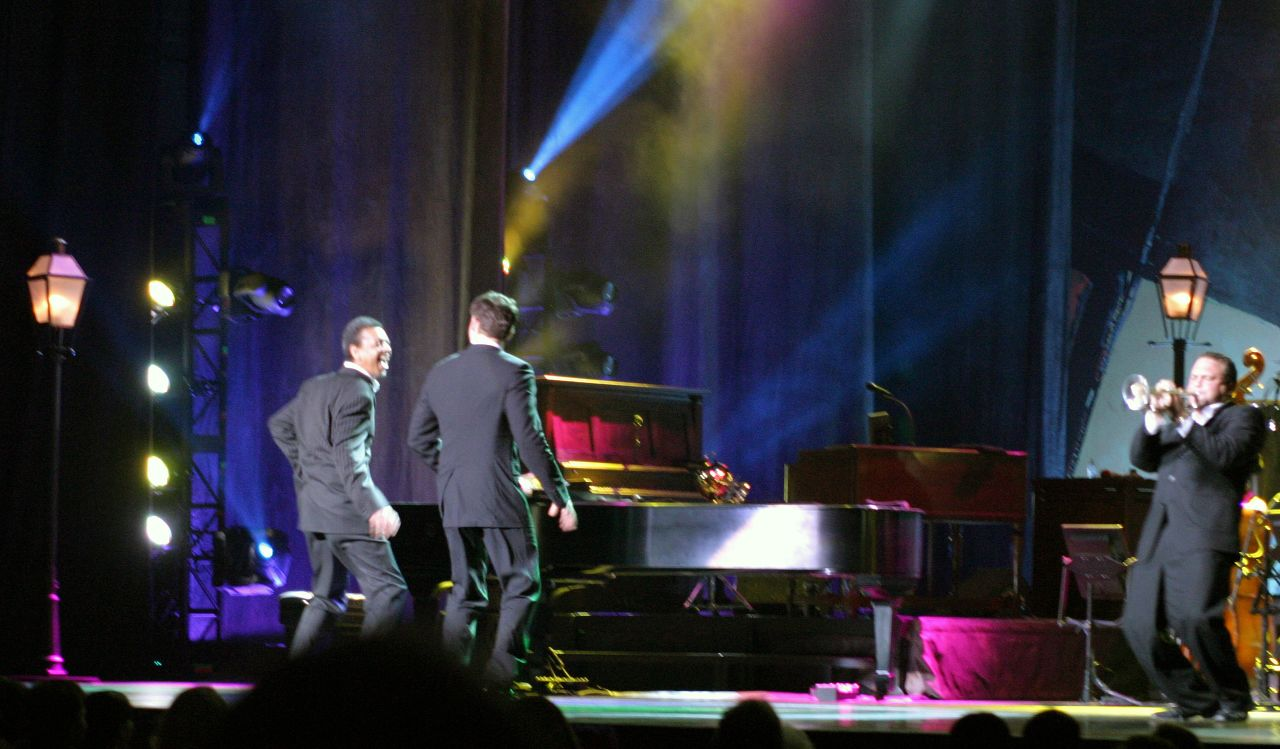
Harry Connick Jr at the Johnny Mercer Theater, Savannah, Georgia February 27, 2007. (Lucien Barbarin and Harry Connick Jr to the left, Mark Braud to the right.)

Other performed songs (1 or several times)

- "Dan Dan the Driving Man" (new, unrecorded, about Dan who drives the tour bus)
- "On the Sunny Side of the Street" (from his 1987 album Harry Connick Jr.)
- "Sweet Georgia Brown" (from his 1979 album Eleven)
- "New Orleans" (from his 2007 album Chanson du Vieux Carré)
- "Sugar Blues" (unrecorded)
- "Do Dat Thing" (from his 2007 album Oh, My NOLA)
- "St. James Infirmary Blues" (bonus track on his 1999 album Come By Me)
- "Mardi Gras in New Orleans" (from his 2007 album Chanson du Vieux Carré)
- "It Had to Be You" (from his 1989 album When Harry Met Sally...)

== Tour dates ==
Date	City	Country	Venue
North America
February 23, 2007	Boca Raton	United States	Mizner Park Amphitheatre
February 24, 2007	Clearwater	United States	Ruth Eckerd Hall
February 25, 2007	Miami	United States	Adrienne Arsht Center for the Performing Arts – Knight Concert Hall
February 26, 2007	Orlando	United States	Bob Carr Performing Arts Center
February 27, 2007	Savannah	United States	Johnny Mercer Theater
March 1, 2007	Ashville	United States	Thomas Wolfe Auditorium
March 2, 2007	North Charleston	United States	N. Charleston Performing Arts Center
March 3, 2007	Columbia	United States	Township Auditorium
March 4, 2007	Charlotte	United States	Ovens Auditorium
March 7, 2007	Atlanta	United States	Fox Theatre
March 8, 2007	Huntsville	United States	Von Braun Center Concert Hall
March 9, 2007	Birmingham	United States	BJCC Concert Hall
March 10, 2007	Knoxville	United States	Civic Auditorium
March 11, 2007	Louisville	United States	Palace Theatre
March 13, 2007	Nashville	United States	Tennessee PAC – Andrew Jackson Hall
March 14, 2007	Indianapolis	United States	Murat Theatre
March 15, 2007	Chicago	United States	Chicago Theatre
March 16, 2007	Chicago	United States	Chicago Theatre
March 17, 2007	St. Louis	United States	Fox Theatre
April 4, 2007	Ames	United States	Stephens Auditorium
April 5, 2007	Minneapolis	United States	The Orpheum Theatre
April 6, 2007	Milwaukee	United States	Milwaukee Theatre
April 7, 2007	South Bend	United States	Morris PAC
April 9, 2007	Cleveland	United States	State Theatre
April 11, 2007	Pittsburgh	United States	Benedum Center
April 12, 2007	Toledo	United States	Stranahan Theatre
April 13, 2007	Buffalo	United States	Shea's PAC
April 14, 2007	Toronto	Canada	The Hummingbird Centre
April 15, 2007	London	Canada	John Labatt Centre
April 19, 2007	Providence	United States	Providence Performing Arts Center
April 20, 2007	Atlantic City	United States	Borgata Event Center
April 21, 2007	New York City	United States	Radio City Music Hall
April 22, 2007	Rochester	United States	Auditorium Theatre
April 23, 2007	Schenectady	United States	Proctors Theatre
April 25, 2007	Boston	United States	Wang Theatre at Citi PAC
April 26, 2007	Syracuse	United States	Landmark Theatre
April 27, 2007	Wallingford	United States	Chevy Theatre
Apr 28, 2007	Baltimore	United States	Joseph Meyerhoff Symphony Hall
May 6, 2007	New Orleans	United States	New Orleans Jazz & Heritage Festival
May 8, 2007	San Antonio	United States	Majestic Theatre
May 10, 2007	Austin	United States	Bass Performing Arts Center
May 11, 2007	The Woodlands	United States	Cynthia Woods Mitchell Pavilion
May 12, 2007	Grand Prairie	United States	Nokia Theatre
May 14, 2007	Albuquerque	United States	Sandia Casino
May 15, 2007	Phoenix	United States	Dodge Theatre
May 17, 2007	San Diego	United States	Bayside Amphitheatre
May 18, 2007	Los Angeles	United States	Greek Theatre
May 19, 2007	Palm Desert	United States	McCallum Theatre
May 20, 2007	Santa Barbara	United States	Arlington Theater
May 22, 2007	Fresno	United States	William Saroyan Theatre
May 23, 2007	Bakersfield	United States	Rabobank Arena
May 24, 2007	San Francisco	United States	Louise M. Davies Symphony Hall
May 25, 2007	San Jose	United States	San Jose Center for the Performing Arts
May 26, 2007	Sonoma	United States	Sonoma Jazz Festival
May 27, 2007	Reno	United States	Grand Sierra Resort & Casino
May 29, 2007	Spokane	United States	INB Performing Arts Center
May 30, 2007	Eugene	United States	Hult Center for the Performing Arts
June 1, 2007	Portland	United States	Arlene Schnitzer Hall
June 2, 2007	Seattle	United States	Chateau Ste. Michelle
June 3, 2007	Vancouver	Canada	Vancouver Centre for Performing Arts
June 5, 2007	Nampa	United States	Idaho Center
June 6, 2007	Salt Lake City	United States	Abravanel Hall
June 7, 2007	Morrison	United States	Red Rocks Amphitheatre
June 15, 2007	Mashantucket	United States	Fox Theatre at Foxwoods Casino
June 17, 2007	Philadelphia	United States	Kimmel Center – Verizon Hall
June 19, 2007	Ottawa	Canada	Scotiabank Place
June 21, 2007	Vienna	United States	Wolf Trap
June 22, 2007	Cary	United States	Koka Booth Amphitheater
June 23, 2007	Greenville	United States	Peace Center
June 24, 2007	Atlanta	United States	Chastain Park Amphitheater
June 25, 2007	Atlanta	United States	Chastain Park Amphitheater
June 27, 2007	Reading	United States	Sovereign PAC
June 28, 2007	Wilmington	United States	The Grand Opera House
June 30, 2007	Montreal	Canada	Place des Arts/Montreal Jazz Festival
Europe
October 24, 2007	Berlin	Germany	Schillertheatre
October 25, 2007	Hamburg	Germany	~~Laeiszhalle~~ Cancelled
October 26, 2007	Copenhagen	Denmark	Falkoner Theatre
October 28, 2007	The Hague	Netherlands	World Forum
October 29, 2007	Antwerp	Belgium	Queen Elizabeth Hall
October 30, 2007	Paris	France	Le Grand Rex
October 31, 2007	Paris	France	Le Grand Rex
November 3, 2007	London	England	Royal Albert Hall
November 5, 2007	Madrid	Spain	Teatro Circo
November 6, 2007	Málaga	Spain	Teatro Cervantes
November 7, 2007	Zaragoza	Spain	Sala Multiusos
November 10, 2007	Barcelona	Spain	Palau de la Música
November 13, 2007	Dublin	Ireland	RDS Main Hall
November 14, 2007	Belfast	Northern Ireland	Waterfront Hall
November 16, 2007	Glasgow	Scotland	Clyde Auditorium
November 17, 2007	Birmingham	England	Birmingham Symphony Hall
November 18, 2007	Birmingham	England	Birmingham Symphony Hall
Asia
March 3, 2008	Kuala Lumpur	Malaysia	Petronas Philharmonic Hall
March 4, 2008	Kuala Lumpur	Malaysia	Petronas Philharmonic Hall
March 5, 2008	Kuala Lumpur	Malaysia	Petronas Philharmonic Hall
March 7, 2008	Singapore	Singapore	Mosaic Music Festival
March 9, 2008	Shanghai	China	Changning Arena
March 11, 2008	Beijing	China	Expo Theatre
March 13, 2008	Seoul	South Korea	Sejong Center for the Performing Arts
March 15, 2008	Manila	Philippines	Philippine International Convention Center
March 17, 2008	Bangkok	Thailand	Central World Convention Center
March 19, 2008	Hong Kong	China	Hong Kong Convention & Exhibition Centre
Australia
March 23, 2008	Sydney	Australia	Sydney Opera House
March 26, 2008	St Kilda	Australia	Palais Theatre
March 27, 2008	St Kilda	Australia	Palais Theatre
March 28, 2008	Canberra	Australia	Royal Theatre
March 30, 2008	Perth	Australia	Kings Park
