= Learn to Love =

Learn to Love may refer to:

- "Learn to Love", song by Harry Connick, Jr from To See You
- "Learn to Love", song by Leeland from Love Is on the Move, 2009
- "Learn to Love", song by Voisper from Voice + Whisper, 2016
- Learn to Love (Bon Jovi song) redirect
