= 100 Biggest Weather Moments =

- 100 Biggest Weather Moments' title screen
- Starring: Host: Harry Connick, Jr. Other: Various celebrity commentaries, The Weather Channel's on-air meteorologists
- Country of origin: United States
- No. of episodes: 5

Production
- Running time: approx. 1 hour per episode

Original release
- Network: The Weather Channel
- Release: April 15 – April 19, 2007

100 Biggest Weather Moments was a 2007 five-part miniseries on The Weather Channel, that premiered on Sunday, April 15, and aired nightly through Thursday, April 19, the biggest documentary effort in The Weather Channel's 25-year history.

The series was hosted by Harry Connick, Jr. and counted down the top weather-related events (mostly from the United States) with commentary from various celebrities. The collection of weather moments was the work of more than 120 meteorologists.

A second version of Top 100 Weather Moments premiered on June 14, 2020 with five episodes running through July 12, 2020.

== Episode details ==
Ep.	Moment #s	Original Air Date	Ep. length
1	100–78	April 15, 2007	1 hour
2	77–56	April 16, 2007	1 hour
3	55–34	April 17, 2007	1 hour
4	33–13	April 18, 2007	1 hour
5	12–1	April 19, 2007	1 hour

== Weather moments ==
=== Episode #1 ===
100. The Snow Plow Game
99. Stradivarius violins
98. 1993 Midwest Flooding
97. Blowing in the wind
96. Sunglasses
95. The hygrometer
94. Paris Wine Tasting
93. Golfball dimples
92. 1978 Blizzard
91. Singular snowflakes
90. Weather insurance
89. Punxsutawney Phil
88. Ice skates
87. The Battle of Dunkirk
86. Saffir–Simpson scale
85. Catalytic converter
84. Shackleton's Antarctic exploration
83. Macintosh / Gore-Tex
82. Iceberg sinks the Titanic
81. Desert Storm
80. Long Island Express
79. Saving Dr. Nielsen
78. The umbrella

=== Episode #2 ===
77. Invention of the snowboard
76. Rainy spring in Ireland
75. Buddy Holly plane crash
74. The Serum Run
73. NYC Blackout 1977
72. Personal Severe Weather Notification
71. Joanne Simpson
70. Solar Power
69. 1979 Cotton Bowl Classic
68. 1883 Eruption of Krakatoa / The Scream
67. Weather Balloon Transforms History
66. Fossett's Balloon Adventure
65. European heat wave 2003
64. Operation Eagle Claw
63. Naming of hurricanes
62. Hurricane Andrew
61. Hollywood becomes film capitol
60. The Anemometer
59. Battle of the Bulge
58. Eruption of Mt.Tambora
57. Poor Richard's Almanack
56. Perfect Storm

=== Episode #3 ===
55. Wizard of Oz tornado
54. First tornado forecast
53. Domed stadiums / AstroTurf
52. Silent Spring
51. The Ice Bowl
50. Sun's relationship to earth
49. Battle of Long Island
48. Labor Day Hurricane
47. The Fujita scale
46. World War II and the jet stream
45. Peshtigo Fire
44. Speed and the wind tunnel
43. El Niño of the century
42. Hitler's march on Moscow
41. First cloud classification
40. Johnstown Flood
39. Hurricane Mitch
38. Hurricane hunters
37. Tree rings, ice cores and fossils
36. Rossby waves
35. The ozone hole
34. First TV Weather

=== Episode #4 ===
33. First Winter Olympics
32. Antifreeze
31. Storm chasers
30. Tri-State Tornado, 1925
29. Bob Beamon's Long Jump
28. Windshield wiper
27. The Challenger explosion
26. 1993 Superstorm
25. The Weather Channel
24. Boston Massacre
23. The barometer
22. Creation of the EPA
21. Allergy index
20. Doppler radar
19. Galveston Hurricane
18. Microbursts
17. Dust Bowl era
16. Pilgrims at Plymouth Rock
15. Bangladesh arises from disaster
14. Live Aid
13. The second atomic bomb

=== Episode #5 ===
12. Franklin Flies a Kite
11. UV Index
10. 1974 Tornado Super Outbreak
9. Flooding of 1927
8. Invention of the thermometer
7. Supercomputers
6. Air conditioning
5. Amazing Grace
4. First weather satellite
3. The D-Day invasion
2. Hurricane Katrina
1. Global warming

== Personalities include ==
- Harry Connick, Jr. (host)
- Garth Brooks
- Bill Cosby
- Bob Costas
- Laurie David
- Jennifer Garner
- Rudolph Giuliani
- Russel L. Honoré
- Danica Patrick
- Mo Rocca

== Promotion ==
Previews of the miniseries were shown at a virtual "weather island" created by The Weather Channel, in the virtual world Second Life. The Weather Channel wanted to test the effectiveness of advertising in online communities. According to AP, the station looked at it as an opportunity, and hoped that by getting in early, it could become an established leader in that environment.

The Weather Channel donated $75,000 to Musicians' Village, to date the biggest home-rebuilding project in New Orleans after Hurricane Katrina. Connick and saxophonist Branford Marsalis came up with the idea for the village in 2005, in partnership with Habitat for Humanity. The Weather Channel also ran public service announcements about the Musicians' Village.

The TV Guide Channel, as part of its shows Watch This and 411, featured interviews with participants of the miniseries. The TV Guide had placements of The Weather Channel's logo, and the TV Guide website hosted 100 Biggest Weather Moments banner ads.

== See also ==
- Top 100 Weather Moments
