= Roger Ingram =

American trumpeter (born 1957)

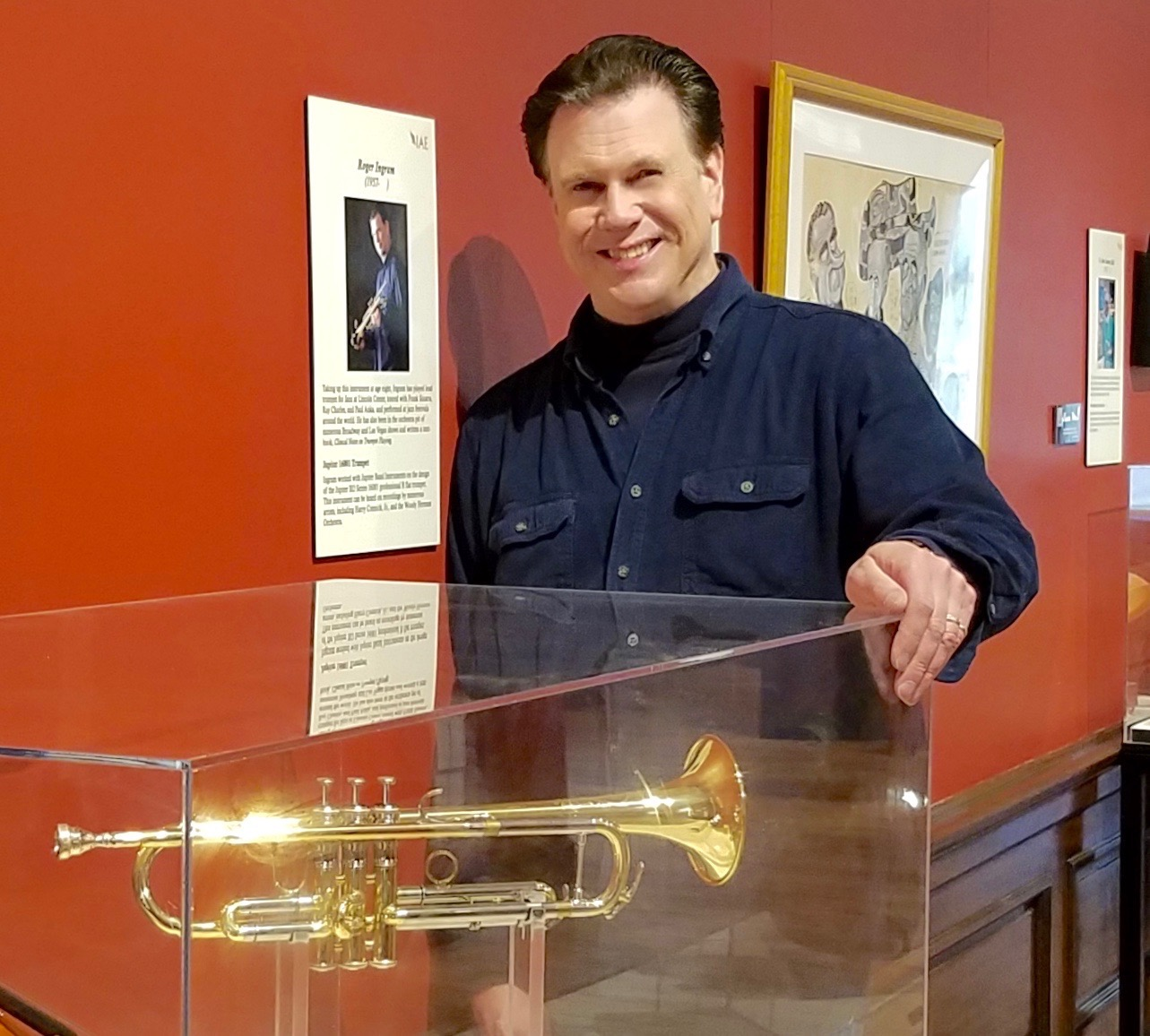
- Roger Ingram at the Kentucky Museum with his 1600i trumpet

Background information
- Birth name: Roger O'Neal Ingram
- Born: November 13, 1957 (age 67); Pasadena, California, United States
- Genres: Jazz, swing, pop
- Occupation(s): Musician, teacher, author, instrument designer
- Instrument(s): Trumpet, flugelhorn, piano
- Years active: 1972–present
- Website: www.rogeringram.com

Roger O'Neal Ingram (born November 13, 1957) is a jazz trumpeter, educator, author, and instrument designer. He played trumpet for the orchestras of Maynard Ferguson, Woody Herman, Wynton Marsalis, Ray Charles, and Harry Connick Jr.

== Early life ==
The youngest of three children, Ingram was born November 13, 1957, in Pasadena, California. His mother ran the household and worked as a tailor and dressmaker from their home in Eagle Rock, Los Angeles; his father was a freelance artist, actor, and musician. His father worked as a staff animator on early Popeye cartoons and several early Disney animations, including the movie Fantasia. He hosted a radio show in Los Angeles in the 1930s, singing and playing ukulele. During the 1940s and 50's he worked in Hollywood as a singer and actor and was in over thirty movie and TV shows, including Gentlemen Prefer Blondes, Superman, and Titanic.

He played saxophone and harmonica and brought Ingram to hear Louis Armstrong, Harry James, Duke Ellington, Count Basie, Al Hirt, Buddy Rich, Barney Bigard, Jack Teagarden, Kid Ory, Woody Herman, Rafael Méndez, and Teddy Buckner. He gave Ingram his first trumpet and mouthpiece in 1965. The trumpet is a bare brass horn made in post-war Japan during the American occupation. The bell is stamped "Koondr, Kailangan Tokyo."

Ingram began playing the trumpet at age eight. Growing up in Los Angeles, he became acquainted with Hollywood session trumpeters. Many of these introductions came through John Rinaldo, his band director at Eagle Rock High School. Rinaldo's jazz program included others who went on to become professionals, such as drummers Carlos Vega and Sam Wiley, bassists Scott Colley and David Stone, guitarist Larry Koonse, saxophonists Doug Rinaldo, Brian Mitchell, and Gary Hypes, trombonists Arturo Velasco and Luis Bonilla, pianist Guy Steiner, and trumpeters Bobby Muzingo and Buddy Gordon. Through Rinaldo, Ingram was able to meet and study with Bobby Shew and Laroon Holt. Ingram's teachers included Bud Brisbois, Mannie Klein, Roy Stevens, Don Raffell, Bobby Findley, Carmine Caruso, Reynold Schilke, James Stamp, Uan Rasey, Mel Broiles, and Dan Jacobs.

== Career ==
=== Early performing ===
At sixteen, Ingram toured with Louie Bellson, sharing section duties with Blue Mitchell, Bobby Shew, Cat Anderson, and Frank Szabo. His first international gigs were with the group during the 1974 Belvedere King Size Jazz Festival Tour at Varsity Stadium in Toronto, the Winnipeg Arena in Winnipeg, and the Pacific Coliseum in Vancouver, Canada. After his stint with Bellson, he graduated from high school and then joined Quincy Jones on a fall tour. After that tour, he spent a year touring with Connie Stevens, playing lead trumpet for the first time.

At eighteen, Ingram played first trumpet with singer Tom Jones and toured with him for six years. After that, he moved to Las Vegas, where for two years he gained experience playing on the Las Vegas Strip.

=== With Woody Herman and Maynard Ferguson ===
In 1985, Ingram joined the Woody Herman Orchestra as lead trumpet. Ingram's friend Ron Stout held the jazz trumpet chair and helped get him in the band. He remained with the band until Herman's death in 1987. He recorded three Grammy-nominated albums with Herman: The 50th Anniversary Tour, Woody's Gold Star, and The Concord Years.

He is the last lead trumpeter to play with the "original" Woody Herman Orchestra. Ingram returned to Los Angeles after Herman's death, founding and co-leading his big band with saxophonist Steve Elliott. The Ingram-Elliott big band featured Bobby Shew, Till Brönner, Bill Watrous, and Gary Foster.

In 1988, he worked with the WDR Jazz Orchestra in Cologne, Germany. While in Germany, he recorded works by Bob Brookmeyer and Jim McNeely with Mel Lewis on drums. During this time, he recorded with saxophonist Loren Schoenberg and pianist Django Bates. Later that year, Ingram joined the orchestra of Maynard Ferguson and recorded three albums with him. In October 2004, he performed as a featured artist at Stratospheric, a four-day festival honoring Ferguson. In September 2006, he performed as a featured soloist at the Maynard Ferguson Tribute Concert in St. Louis, Missouri, with many other trumpeters, including his long-time friend and colleague Wayne Bergeron.

After three years as lead trumpeter for Ferguson, he moved to Florida, where he was a teaching assistant and private instructor at the University of Miami in Coral Gables, Florida. While in Miami, he collaborated with his friend and colleague, Cuban trumpeter Arturo Sandoval, recording the Grammy Award-winning album, Danzon. He also did commercial recording work, performed and toured with the New Xavier Cugat Orchestra, and worked on a consistent basis with the Peter Graves Orchestra.

=== With Harry Connick Jr. and Lincoln Center ===
In 1990, Ingram joined the newly formed big band of pianist Harry Connick Jr. He recorded three albums with Connick, working with him until the orchestra disbanded in 1993. The following year, he toured with singer Frank Sinatra. Later in 1994, he moved to New York City, joining Wynton Marsalis and the Lincoln Center Jazz Orchestra. He recorded three albums with Wynton Marsalis, including the Pulitzer Prize-winning Blood on the Fields.

Ingram left Jazz at Lincoln Center in 1997 to tour and record with Ray Charles for two years. After touring with singer-songwriter Paul Anka, he joined the re-formed Harry Connick Jr. Big Band in 1998 and recorded the Grammy-nominated album Come by Me. In April 2000, the Recording Industry Association of America (RIAA) gave that album a gold record certification. In the summer of 2001, he toured with the Count Basie Orchestra, returning to tour with Connick in November. Ingram has appeared on several of Connick's albums, including Blue Light, Red Light, When My Heart Finds Christmas, Songs I Heard, Harry for the Holidays, Thou Shalt Not, Chanson du Vieux Carre, Oh My NOLA, and What a Night! A Christmas Album.

=== Broadway and festivals ===
While living in New York, Ingram performed in a freelance capacity in more than twenty Broadway productions, including Chicago, Grease, Cats, Les Misérables, and The Producers. In addition, he played trumpet for the Alvin Ailey Dance Theatre and serving as the principal trumpeter in the Broadway shows and cast albums of Thou Shalt Not, The Pajama Game, and Harry on Broadway, Act 1.

=== Instrument design ===
In 2009, Ingram designed a B♭ trumpet for the Jupiter Band Instrument Company. This trumpet is the XO Series 1600I model, known as the I-horn, and is the trumpet he uses exclusively. He also performs with the Jupiter XO Series professional flugelhorn and the Jupiter XO Series professional 4-valve B-flat/A piccolo trumpet (Jupiter 1700RS). For fun, he also plays the Jupiter 528L valve trombone.

From 2011 to 2014, manufactured by Pickett Brass of Lexington Kentucky, Ingram's line of six professional mouthpieces for B-flat trumpet (the V-cup, the Lead, the Studio, the Jazz, the Be-Bop, and the Instant Chet) arrived on the market. Two additional models (the Lead-2 and Studio-2) were added in 2016.

A line of classic mutes designed by Ingram and manufactured by Warburton USA was launched at the Midwest Clinic in December 2016. These accessories for trumpet and cornet are the Ingram-MuteMeister Cup, ShowTone, and Straight mutes.

=== Solo work and writing ===
Ingram's debut solo album, Roger Ingram Live at the College Hideaway, was released and reviewed in 2014. His second album, Skylark, was released in 2015. Both were on his One Too Tree Records label.

In February 2010, after 36 years, he "retired" from the tour bus and being a sideman. Since 2005, he has been an Artist in Residence of the Music Conservatory at the Chicago College of Performing Arts at Roosevelt University.

Ingram's textbook, Clinical Notes on Trumpet Playing, was published in 2008. In December 2015, Ingram wrote his first article for The Brass Herald and became a regular columnist for the magazine.

== Awards and honors ==
- Runner-up (2nd place) Trumpet, Down Beat 81st Annual Readers Poll, 2016
- Induction into Kentucky Museum Instruments of American Excellence Collection, 2012
- Lead trumpet on two Grammy winning recordings: Songs I Heard (Columbia/Sony) by Harry Connick, Jr. and Danzón (Milan) by Arturo Sandoval
- Lead trumpet on five Grammy nominated recordings: Your Songs (Sony) and Come by Me (Sony) by Harry Connick, Jr.; 50th Anniversary Tour (Concord), Woody's Gold Star (Concord), and The Concord Years (Concord) by Woody Herman
- Lead trumpet on the Pulitzer Prize winning recording, Blood on the Fields (Sony) by Wynton Marsalis
- Lead trumpet Thou Shalt Not, two nominations, Tony Awards, 2002
- Lead trumpet The Pajama Game, nine nominations and two wins, Tony Awards, 2006

== Discography ==
As leader

- 2014 Roger Ingram Live at the College Hideaway (One Too Tree)
- 2015 Skylark (One Too Tree)

As sideman

With Harry Connick, Jr.

- 1991 Blue Light, Red Light (Sony)
- 1992 Swing Time (Sony)
- 1993 Forever for Now (Sony)
- 1993 France, I Wish You Love (Sony)
- 1993 When My Heart Finds Christmas (Sony)
- 1999 Come By Me (Sony)
- 2001 Songs I Heard (Sony)
- 2002 Thou Shalt Not (Sony)
- 2006 Harry on Broadway, Act I (Sony)
- 2007 All These People (Sony)
- 2007 Chanson du Vieux Carré (Sony)
- 2007 Oh My NOLA (Sony)
- 2003 Harry for the Holidays (Sony)
- 2004 Only You (Sony)
- 2008 What a Night! A Christmas Album (Sony)
- 2009 Your Songs (Sony)

With Maynard Ferguson

- 1988 Big Bop Nouveau (Intima)
- 1992 Footpath Café (Avion)
- 1993 Live from London (Avenue)

With Woody Herman

- 1986 50th Anniversary Tour (Concord)
- 1987 Ebony (RCA)
- 1987 Woody's Gold Star (Concord)
- 2003 Live at Fitzgeralds (Big Head)

With Wynton Marsalis

- 1994 They Came to Swing, Jazz at Lincoln Center (Sony)
- 1995 Blood on the Fields (Sony)
- 1999 Reeltime (Sony)
- 1999 Sweet Release and Ghost Story (Sony)
- 2011 Selections from Swinging into the 21st (Sony)
- 2012 Music of America (Sony)
- 2012 Swinging Into the 21st (Sony Legacy)
- 2013 The Spiritual Side of Wynton Marsalis (Sony)

With others

- 1985 The Spirit of Christmas (Columbia), Ray Charles
- 1986 Live at Newport and at the Hollywood Bowl, July 1986, (Jazz Band), Stan Getz
- 1988 Conducting in the Stan Kenton Style (Klavier), Al Yankee
- 1988 The Best of Bill Medley (MCA), Bill Medley
- 1989 Sophisticated Lady (Sea Breeze), Frank Mantooth
- 1990 Dangerous Precedent (Sea Breeze), Frank Mantooth
- 1991 Simply Mad About the Mouse (Sony), Various Artists
- 1994 I Was Born in Love with You (Blue Note), Denise Jannah
- 1994 Lip Trip (Mean Bugle), Jim Manley
- 1994 The Kush:Music of Dizzy Gillespie (Heads Up), Richie Cole
- 1994 The Sound:A Tribute to Stan Getz, Billy Ross
- 1994 To Ella With Love (Shanachie), Ann Hampton Callaway
- 1996 Danzon (Dance On) (Milan), Arturo Sandoval
- 1996 Heart of a Legend (Milestone), Chico O'Farrill
- 1996 Slender, Tender and Tall (Panda Digital), Jo Thompson
- 2000 Live...and Swinging (PANKA), Paul Anka
- 2003 Home of My Heart (Origin), Chris Walden
- 2003 Please Send Me Someone to Love (Stanson), Sonny Craver with the Pat Longo Big Band
- 2004 The Minute Game (Summit), Scott Whitfield Jazz Orchestra West
- 2005 Taking the Long Way Home (Jazzed Media), Bud Shank
- 2005 Robots Soundtrack, (Virgin), John Powell
- 2007 Hommage (Jazzed Media), Bill Holman
- 2008 The Baecker Jazz Worship Service (John Cooper Music), John Cooper
- 2009 You Ought to Be Havin' Fun (Rob Zappulla Music)
- 2010 Blueprints (Chicago Sessions), Chicago Afro Latin Jazz Ensemble
- 2012 There's Nothing Like Christmas (Jimmy Stewart Productions), Jimmy Stewart
- 2012 We'll be Together Again (Jazztech), Rob Parton Big Band
- 2013 Christmas Time is Here (Jazztech), Rob Parton Big Band
- 2016 Waltz About Nothing (OA2), New Standard Jazz Orchestra
- 2019 Midnight Stroll (CH.ILL. Jazz), Joshua Jern Jazz Orchestra

== Filmography ==
Harry Connick Jr.

- 1990 Swinging Out Live, Sony (DVD)
- 1991 Blue Light, Red Light, Columbia (Music Video – soundtrack recording)
- 1992 You Didn't Know Me When, Columbia (Music Video – soundtrack recording, film appearance)
- 1993 The New York Big Band Concert, (Video)
- 1993 The Harry Connick Jr. Christmas Special
- 1994 Sleigh Ride, Columbia (Music Video – soundtrack recording)
- 1994 The Harry Connick Jr. Christmas Special (video)
- 1999 Come By Me Columbia (Music Video – soundtrack recording)
- 2003 Harry for the Holidays
- 2004 Only You: In Concert
- 2005 The Happy Elf, Columbia (film, soundtrack recording)
- 2007 All These People, Columbia (music video – soundtrack recording)
- 2009 All the Way, Sony (Music Video – soundtrack recording, film appearance)
- 2009 Close to You, Sony (Music Video – soundtrack recording, film appearance)

Others

- 1976 Edmonton 'In Concert' Series – ITV, w/Connie Stevens
- 1980 Knott's Berry Farm, (TV special) w/Tom Jones
- 1981 Tom Jones Live in Las Vegas 1981, w/Tom Jones
- 1989 Cameron's Closet, Sony Pictures (soundtrack recording) released on DVD 2004
- 1997 Live at the Montreux Jazz Festival, Pioneer, (DVD) Ray Charles
- 1999 Music My Way, Sony (DVD) – Paul Anka
- 2001 Live at the Montreal Jazz Festival, Sony (DVD) – Paul Anka
- 2005 Robots, 20th Century Fox (Film – soundtrack recording)
- 2006 Maynard Ferguson Tribute, Contemporary (DVD – soundtrack recording, film appearance)
