= Songs from the Heart =

Songs from the Heart may refer to:

- Songs from the Heart (Celtic Woman album), a 2010 album by the group Celtic Woman
- Songs from the Heart (compilation album), a 1998 various artists compilation
- Songs from the Heart (George Jones album), 1962
- Songs from the Heart (Johnny Hartman album), 1955
- Songs from the Heart (Mark Vincent album), 2012
- Songs from the Heart (Rick Price album), 1996
- Songs from the Heart (Yanni album), 1999
- Songs from the Heart (Yolanda Adams album), 1998
- Songs from the Heart (Sandi Patty album), 1984
