= Musicians' Village =

- Neighborhood
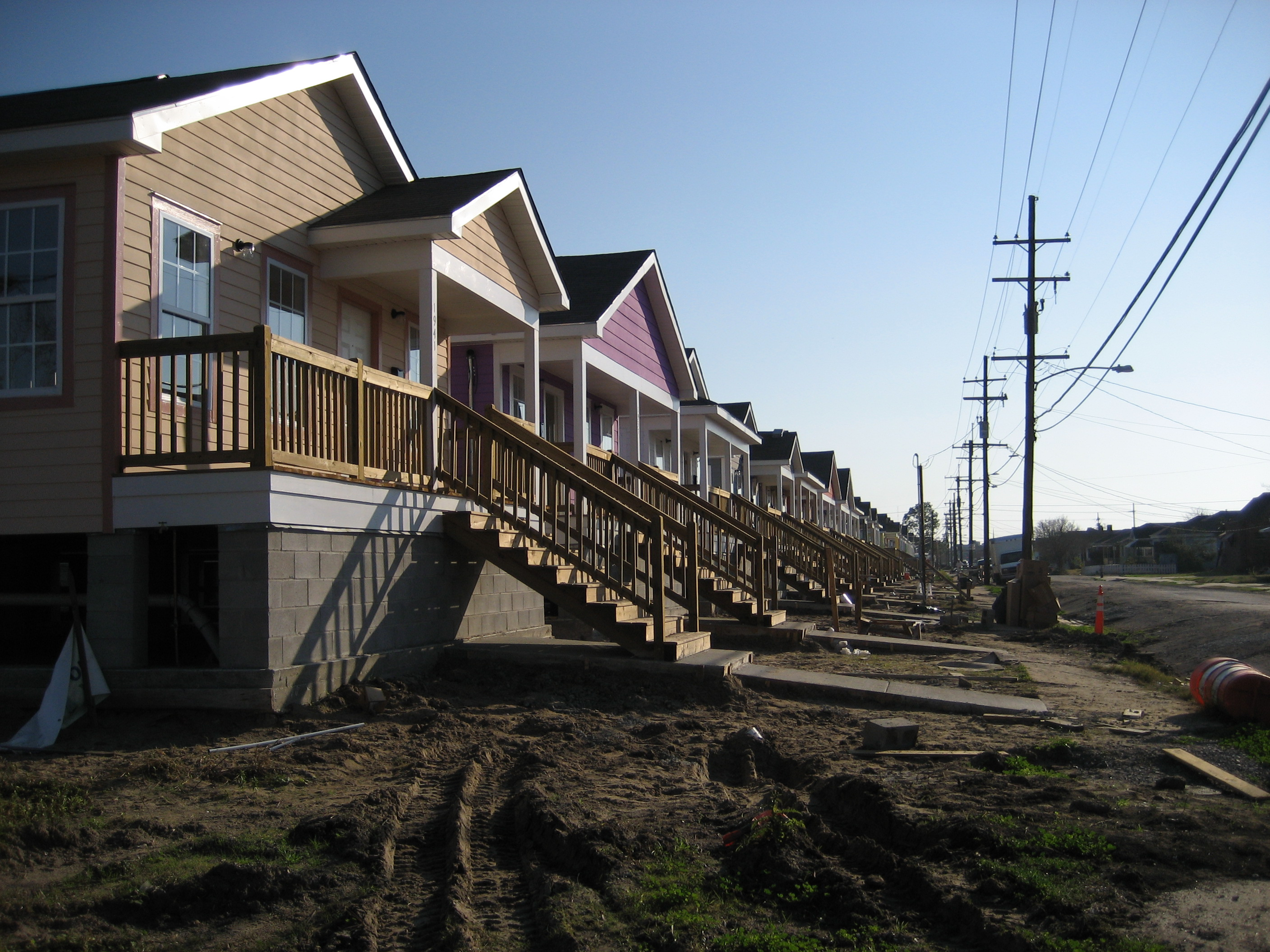
- Some of the early houses built at Musicians' Village, in the Upper Ninth Ward

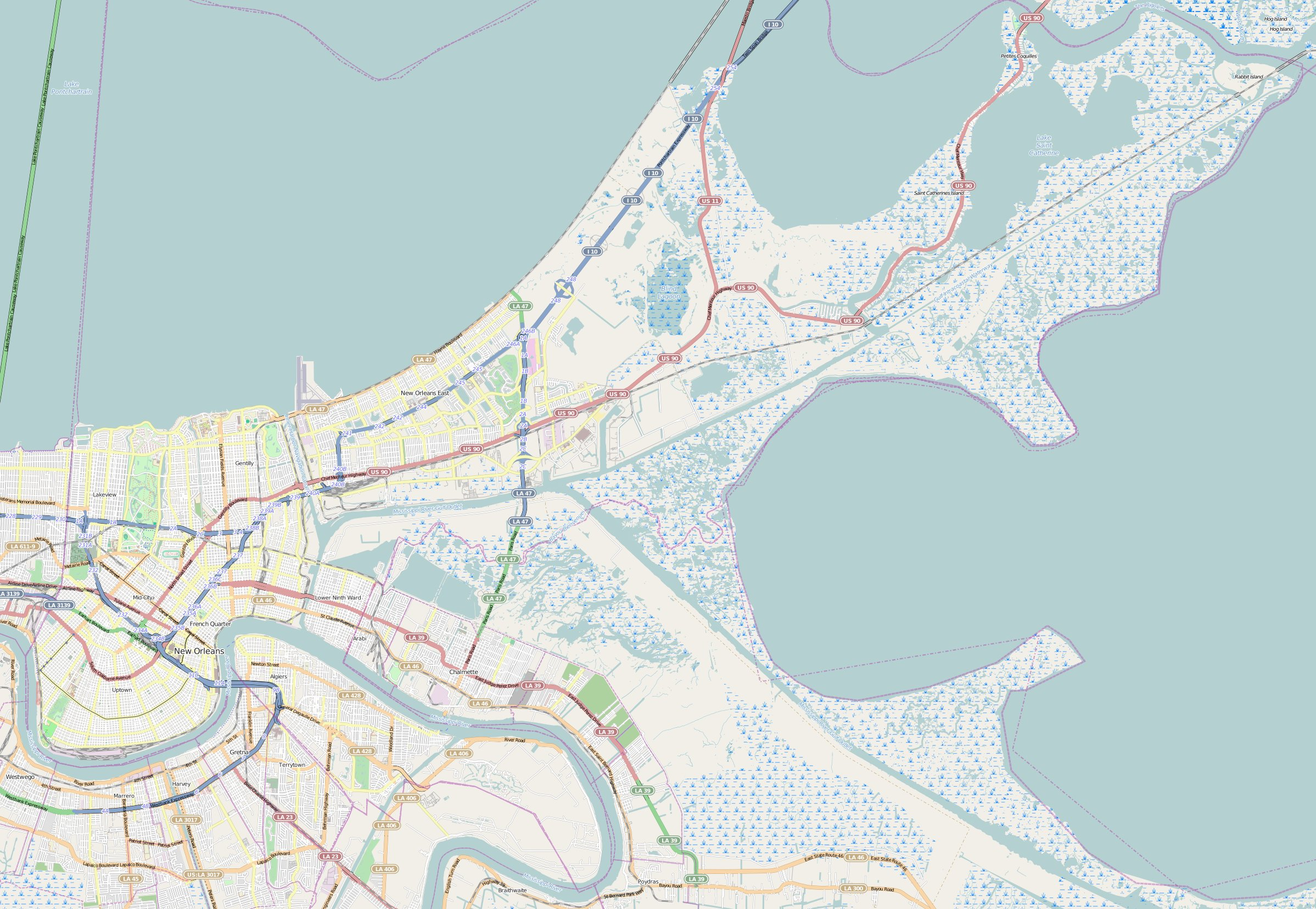
- Musicians' Village in New Orleans
- Coordinates: 29.9743°N 90.0333°W

Musicians' Village is a neighborhood located in the Upper Ninth Ward in New Orleans, Louisiana. Musicians Harry Connick, Jr. and Branford Marsalis teamed up with Habitat for Humanity International and New Orleans Area Habitat for Humanity to create the village for New Orleans musicians who lost their homes to Hurricane Katrina.

Per February 2007, the Musicians' Village is "the largest-scale, highest-profile, and biggest-budget rebuilding project to have gotten underway in New Orleans post-Katrina.

== Planning ==
The idea of bringing music back to New Orleans was popular, and by September 2006 the entire area, including the Baptist Crossroads project, was known and referred to as Musicians' Village.

== Construction ==
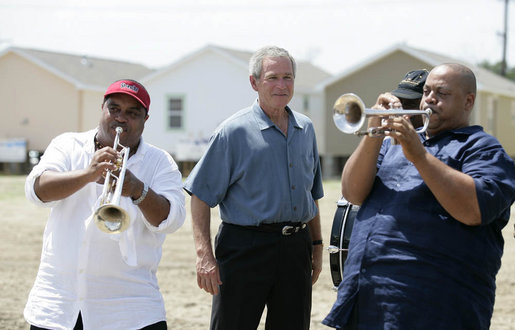
President George W. Bush is greeted by the New Birth Brass Band on August 29, 2006, at the Habitat for Humanity's Musician's Village.

Keys to the first three houses were given on June 1, 2006. New homeowners Fredy Omar con su Banda and Jerome Deleno "J.D." Hill - with "J.D. and the Jammers" - played for the 300 or more people who had gathered for the dedication ceremony and party.

Politicians George W. Bush, Kathleen Blanco, Ray Nagin and Bill Jefferson volunteered at the Musicians' Village on April 27, 2006. They put on tool belts and hoisted triangular roof beam sections up to workers scampering across the wooden skeletons of new houses. Then they went inside the framework, talked with individual volunteers, before Nagin and Bush climbed up and started hammering nails handed up to them by Blanco and Jefferson. Hootie & The Blowfish brought their band and crew to New Orleans for five days of building houses, on October 16–20, 2006. Former president Jimmy Carter worked in December 2006. Barack Obama took part in painting a home, held discussions, received a tour of the area and was entertained with music by J.D. Hill. Karekin II, leader of the Armenian Apostolic Church, helped build a home on October 17, 2007, and senator John Edwards helped on January 30, 2008.

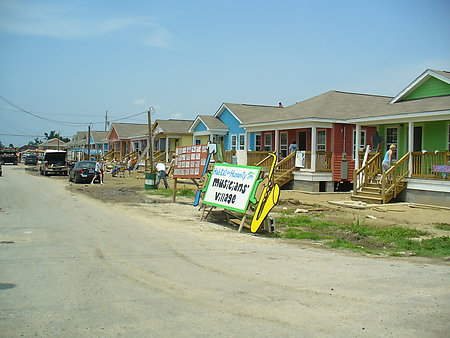
Homes being built as part of the Musician's Village Project on June 1, 2007.

=== Ellis Marsalis Center for Music ===
A centerpiece of the village is the Ellis Marsalis Center for Music, dedicated to celebrating the music and musicians of New Orleans and to the education and development of homeowners and others who live nearby. The center features indoor and outdoor performance spaces as well as practice rooms and classrooms. The center has 51 off-street parking spaces. The center will be managed by the nonprofit foundation New Orleans Habitat Musicians Village Inc. The two-story center contains a 170-seat theater and performance hall with movable seats, including dressing and practice rooms. A courtyard with a retractable roof will be between this center and a smaller community center that will contain meeting rooms, offices, classrooms and a community Internet room. Harry Connick Jr. and Branford Marsalis have been "heavily involved in the design process" of the center, according to Jim Pate.

In April 2007, the plans for the building won approval from the City Planning Commission. Engineers began grading the site in May, 2007. The groundbreaking was kicked off on September 13, 2007, with a celebration that included performances from Bob French and the Original Tuxedo Band and Shamarr Allen Combo, with guest artists Harry Connick Jr. and Branford Marsalis sitting in. The Ellis Marsalis Center for Music opened at the end of August 2011 in New Orleans's Upper 9th Ward.

== Fundraising events ==
- New Orleans artist Fredrick Guess Studio and Café Amelie — special gallery opening and benefit. Sunday, April 9, 2006
- German Seaside Jazzmen — a Dixieland band from Norden - benefit concert. March 2006
- Ellis Marsalis — "Musicians Village" fundraiser in Calgary, March 24, 2006.
- The Washington DC music community - concert From the Beltway to the Bayou featuring Eric Hilton from the Thievery Corporation, KidGusto, and DC area Dj's and musicians, on March 27, 2006.
- Funk jam band Electronik Church announced Feb. 27, 2006, a nationwide music tour for the New Orleans Area Habitat for Humanity's Musicians' Village.
- KFOG — (San Francisco / San Jose) announced a promotion to benefit New Orleans Habitat during Mardi Gras weekend 2006.
- Gregg Stafford (trumpeter), joins the Heritage Hall Jazz Band and Jewel Brown (former Louis Armstrong vocalist) for a fundraiser February 18, 2006 in San Diego.
- Chairman of NBC Universal, Bob Wright made a major personal contribution, enough to build an entire house.
- The Click Five — proceeds from selling limited edition, glossy photos on tour over six months, and proceeds from a pre-Mardi Gras concert sponsored by local radio station B97, on February 27, 2006.
- The Pajama Game, starring Harry Connick Jr with Kelli O'Hara & Michael McKean - 5 benefit performances. (Proceeds will benefit the Actors' Fund of America, the New Orleans Habitat Musician's Village, and the Roundabout's Education Program and Musical Theatre Fund.) June 13-17th, 2006.
- Ivan Neville and his group Dumpstaphunk - benefit in Auburn, Alabama, on April 19, 2006.
- Dave Matthews Band — $1.5 million dollars challenge grant. Contributions will be matched dollar for dollar through the grant, raising the total donation potential to $3 million. April 26, 2006.

=== Albums ===
- Funds raised through recordings such as Hurricane Relief: Come Together Now, and Our New Orleans: A Benefit Album for the Gulf Coast, benefit the project.
- Alex Pangman & Colonel Tom Parker of the Backstabbers - proceeds from a 78 rpm recording, and proceeds from the Record Release Party, in Toronto, Canada.
- A portion of the royalties of Harry Connick Jr's albums Oh, My NOLA and Chanson du Vieux Carre will be donated to Musicians' Village, including all royalties from the CD single "All These People".
- An independent music label, Sugarfoot Music, has released a double-disc called For New Orleans (full name: For New Orleans: A Benefit For The Musicians' Village Habitat For Humanity). The artists are donating 100% of the profits to the Musicians' Village. Thirteen of the 30 tracks are previously unreleased. The album includes Jeff Buckley's unreleased recording of "I Shall Be Released" (sung over the phone on live radio).
- All proceeds from the sale of The Marsalis Family's Music Redeems goes directly to educational programming at the Ellis Marsalis Center for Music.

== Awards ==
In 2010, the founders of the Village were awarded the Honor Award by the National Building Museum for their work in civic innovation and community development.

In 2012, Connick and Marsalis received the S. Roger Horchow Award for Greatest Public Service by a Private Citizen, an award given out annually by Jefferson Awards.

== See also ==
- Habitat for Humanity International
- Ninth Ward of New Orleans
