= Elijah Rock =

Song
- Genre: Negro Spiritual

"Elijah Rock" is a traditional spiritual. It has been recorded many times by various artists.

== Lyrics ==
Elijah
Elijah
Elijah
Elijah Rock!

Elijah rock shout shout
Elijah rock comin' up Lord
Elijah rock shout shout
Elijah rock comin' up Lord

Satan ain't nothin' but a
snake in the grass
He's a conjur, he's a liar
Hallelujah, Lord.

Elijah rock shout shout
Elijah rock comin' up Lord
Elijah rock shout shout
Elijah rock comin' up Lord

If I could I surely would
Stand on the rock where Moses stood
If I could I surely would
Stand on the rock where Moses stood

Elijah rock, oh Elijah rock
Elijah
Elijah rock, oh Elijah rock
Elijah
Hallelujah Jesus, Hallelujah Jesus
Hallelujah Jesus, Hallelujah Jesus
Rock Elijah, Rock Elijah
Rock Elijah, Rock Elijah
Comin' up Lawdy, Comin' up Lawdy
Comin' up Lawdy, Comin' up Lawdy
Oh oh oh Elijah, Oh oh oh oh
Elijah
Oh Elijah
Elijah rock Elijah rock shout
comin' I'm comin' I'm comin' up Lord

== Recorded by ==
- Mahalia Jackson on album Recorded in Europe During Her Latest Concert Tour (1962), and on a number of albums and compilations.
- Camille Doughty on album God's Prescriptions (1978)
- Raymond Myles on album A Taste of Heaven (1994).
- Moses Hogan arranger and conductor on Negro Spirituals (1996) (with Derek Lee Ragin) and on I Believe This Is Jesus (2001)
- Jean Shy on album Amazing Grace (1999)
- Atlanta's Chorale on album The Jericho Project (2005)
- Owen Messer on album Oh, My NOLA (2007)
- Ollabelle on album Ollabelle (2005) and Before This Time (Live album) (2008)
- The Mormon Tabernacle Choir on album An American Heritage of Spirituals (1997)
- The Klezmatics on album Live at town hall (2011)
- Joshua Nelson on album Mi Chamocha? (2009)
