= Songs from the Heart (compilation album) =

Studio album by Various Artists
- Released: February 3, 1998
- Genre: Pop
- Length: 48:21
- Label: Columbia

Professional ratings
Review scores
Source	Rating
Allmusic	3/5 stars

Songs from the Heart is a various artists compilation, released in 1998, containing love songs by artists from Columbia Records (United States). The album was marketed for Valentine's Day February 14.

== Track listing ==
1. "To See You" – 3:56 - Harry Connick, Jr.
2. "Sweet Love" – 4:38 - Nancy Wilson
3. "Can't Help Falling in Love" – 3:22 - Julio Iglesias
4. "For You" – 3:56 - Kenny Lattimore
5. "Why Me" – 4:35 - Michael Bolton
6. "You And The Mona Lisa" – 4:05 - Shawn Colvin
7. "Me, Myself & I (Are All In Love With You)" – 2:05 - Tony Bennett
8. "Jump Up Behind Me" – 3:28 - James Taylor
9. "Let Your Heart Remember" – 4:36 - Johnny Mathis
10. "The Unimaginable Life" – 6:11 - Kenny Loggins
11. "To Make You Feel My Love" – 3:51 - Billy Joel
12. "What If We Went To Italy" – 3:38 - Mary Chapin Carpenter
