= Oh, My NOLA =

Studio album by Harry Connick Jr.
- Released: January 30, 2007
- Recorded: June 19–22, 2006
- Genre: Big band
- Length: 66:06
- Label: Sony/Columbia (U.S.)
- Producer: Tracey Freeman

Harry Connick Jr. chronology
| Chanson du Vieux Carre (2007) | Oh, My NOLA (2007) | What a Night! A Christmas Album (2008) |

Singles from Oh, My NOLA
- 1. "All These People" Released: August 29, 2006

Professional ratings
Review scores
| Source | Rating |
|---|---|
| Allmusic | 4.5/5 stars |
| JazzTimes | Favorable |
| Post-Gazette | 4/5 stars |
| Slant Magazine | 4/5 stars |

Oh, My NOLA is an album from Harry Connick Jr. with his big band. The album was released in 2007, and contains well-known songs associated with New Orleans, as well as 4 new songs composed by Connick, who sings and plays the piano, conducts, arranges and orchestrates the album.

A portion of the royalties of Oh, My NOLA will be donated to Musicians' Village in New Orleans. He was honored with a "Strength and Spirit Award" from Redbook magazine in October 2006, for contributing proceeds from various music sales, and for his work on the Musicians' Village.

The album was released at the same day as his big band instrumental album Chanson du Vieux Carre.

The album debuted at number one on the Billboard Top Jazz Albums, and at number 11 on the Billboard 200, with 44,000 copies sold.

A concert tour, the My New Orleans Tour, started on February 23, 2007 in North America, went on to Europe, and continued to Asia and Australia in 2008.

== Track listing ==
1. "Working In The Coal Mine" (Allen Toussaint) – 3:36
2. "Won't You Come Home, Bill Bailey?" (Hughie Cannon) – 3:56
3. "Something You Got" (Chris Kenner) – 3:24
4. "Let Them Talk" (Sonny Thompson) – 5:01
5. "Jambalaya (On the Bayou)" (Hank Williams) – 3:40
6. "Careless Love" (Martin Kaelin, Mac Rebennack) – 4:13
7. "All These People" (Harry Connick Jr.) – 4:12 – featuring Kim Burrell
8. "Yes We Can Can" (Allen Toussaint) – 4:32
9. "Someday" (Dave Bartholomew, Pearl King) – 2:38
10. "Oh, My NOLA" (Connick) – 3:58
11. "Elijah Rock" (traditional) – 4:43
12. "Sheik Of Araby" (Harry Smith, Francis Wheeler, Ted Snyder) – 4:57
13. "Lazy Bones" (Hoagy Carmichael, Johnny Mercer) – 3:47
14. "We Make A Lot Of Love" (Connick) – 3:31
15. "Hello Dolly" (Jerry Herman) – 4:25
16. "Do Dat Thing" (Connick) – 5:33

- Total length: 66:06

=== Bonus tracks ===
- Borders: "Just Come Home"
- Wal-Mart: "Take Her To The Mardi Gras" (Connick)
- Japan release: "Just Come Home", "Take Her To The Mardi Gras"

== Charts ==
| Chart | Provider(s) | Peak position |
|---|---|---|
| Billboard 200 (U.S.) | Billboard | 11 |
| Billboard Top Jazz Albums (U.S.) | Billboard | 1 |
| Billboard Top Digital Album (U.S.) | Billboard | 7 |
| Billboard Top Comprehensive Albums (U.S.) | Billboard | 11 |
| Billboard Top Internet Albums (U.S.) | Billboard | 10 |
| Australian Album Chart | ARIA Charts | 165 |
| Canadian Album Chart | Nielsen SoundScan | 100 |
| Dutch Album Chart | | 57 |
| French Album Chart | SNEP/IFOP | 93 |

== Credits ==
=== Musicians ===
- Vocals: Harry Connick Jr., Kim Burrell
- Piano: Harry Connick Jr., Jonathan Batiste
- Organ: Harry Connick Jr.
- Keyboards: Kim Burrell, Jonathan Batiste, Harry Connick Jr.
- Background Vocals: Jonathan Batiste, Bill Huntington, Evan Vidar, Jonathan DuBose Jr., The Honolulu Heartbreakers
- Trombone: Craig Klein, John Allred, Lucien Barbarin, Troy Andrews, Mark Mullins
- Bass Trombone: Joe Barati
- Trumpet: Roger Ingram, Derrick Gardner, Joe Magnarelli, Leonard Brown, Mark Braud, Wynton Marsalis
- Tuba: John Allred
- Bass: Neal Caine
- Guitar: Jonathan DuBose Jr., Evan Vidar
- Alto saxophone: Charles Goold, James Greene
- Baritone saxophone: David Schumacher
- Tenor saxophone: Jerry Weldon, Mike Karn, Geoff Burke
- Banjo: Bill Huntington
- Flugelhorn: Joe Magnarelli, Roger Ingram
- Drums: Arthur Latin II
- Percussion: Arthur Latin II

=== Other ===
- Arranger: Harry Connick Jr.
- Conductor: Harry Connick Jr., John David Miller
- Orchestration: Harry Connick Jr.
- Soloist: Charles Goold, Jerry Weldon, Lucien Barbarin, Mark Braud
- Coordination: Maria S. Betro
- Music Preparation: Geoff Burke
- Copyist: Geoff Burke
- Engineer: Vincent Caro
- Mixing: Vincent Caro
- Producer: Tracey Freeman
- Assistant Engineer: Hyomin Kang, Rick Kwan
- Art Direction: Arnold Levine
- Design: Arnold Levine
- Mastering: Vlado Meller
- Digital Editing: Alex Venguer, Anthony Ruotolo, Bryant Pugh
- Art Producer: Mary Ellen Stefanides
- Executive Producer: Ann Marie Wilkins
- Cover Photo: Palma Kolansky
