= Kentucky Museum =

- Location: 1444 Kentucky St, Bowling Green, Kentucky
- Coordinates: 36.9889°N 86.4543°W
- Type: History museum, Art museum
- Website: wku.edu/kentuckymuseum

The Kentucky Museum is a history, arts, and culture museum located at 1444 Kentucky Street, Bowling Green, Kentucky on the campus of Western Kentucky University. It includes 80,000 square feet of exhibit space.

Archaeology, art, clothing and textiles, furniture, glassware ceramics, quilts, toys and games are all permanent exhibits at the museum.

== Description ==
=== Permanent exhibits ===
Permanent exhibits include the life of Duncan Hines, a look at the Civil War from a local perspective, a decorative arts gallery ranging from an Egyptian sarcophagus to 1970s macramé, plus a gallery of regional quilts. Changing galleries display a variety of themes, with community exhibitions, university-class designed and installed exhibitions, and some annual events, like the open art show. In addition, the 1815 Log House displays building techniques, furniture, tools, and clothing authentic to the 1810s time period. Hands-on programs for school classes and educational workshops for adults, lectures, and festivals are also regularly featured at the Kentucky Museum.

=== Former exhibits ===
Former exhibits include the Instruments of American Excellence (IAE) (September 2012 – May 12, 2018). The IAE collected the ordinary means by which Americans have achieved extraordinary things: the actual tools or instruments that have helped change the course of our nation's history. The IAE included items that belonged luminaries such as Madeleine Albright, Daniel Boone, Jimmy Carter, Tony Hawk, Roger Ingram, Helen Keller, and Liza Minnelli.
