= In Concert on Broadway =

Live album by Harry Connick Jr.
- Released: February 8, 2011
- Recorded: July 20 and 31, 2010
- Venue: Neil Simon Theatre, New York City
- Genre: Jazz
- Length: 1:16:18

Harry Connick Jr. chronology
| Your Songs (2009) | In Concert on Broadway (2011) | Music from the Happy Elf: Connick on Piano, Volume 4 (2011) |

In Concert on Broadway is an album by Harry Connick Jr., released in 2011. The album reached a peak position of number 76 on the Billboard 200 and number 2 on the Billboard Jazz Albums chart.

== Track list ==
All tracks are written by Harry Connick Jr., except where noted.

| No. | Title | Writer(s) | Length |
|---|---|---|---|
| 1. | "We Are in Love" | | 2:53 |
| 2. | "The Way You Look Tonight" | Dorothy Fields, Jerome Kern | 4:49 |
| 3. | "Bésame Mucho" | Sunny Skylar, Consuelo Velázquez | 11:14 |
| 4. | "The Other Hours" | | 3:51 |
| 5. | "Nowhere with Love" | | 4:34 |
| 6. | "How Insensitive" | Norman Gimbel, Antônio Carlos Jobim, Vinícius de Moraes | 3:23 |
| 7. | "Come by Me" | | 4:30 |
| 8. | "My Time of Day/I’ve Never Been in Love Before" | Frank Loesser | 3:54 |
| 9. | "All the Way" | Sammy Cahn, James Van Heusen | 3:35 |
| 10. | "Bayou Maharajah" | | 6:09 |
| 11. | "Hear Me in the Harmony" | | 5:30 |
| 12. | "Light the Way" | | 4:23 |
| 13. | "Take Her to the Mardi Gras" | | 6:20 |
| 14. | "Bourbon Street Parade" | Paul Barbarin | 5:55 |
| 15. | "Mardi Gras in New Orleans" | Henry Roeland Byrd | 5:18 |
| Total length: | | | 1:16:18 |
