= Your Songs =

- Cover to the Compact Disc edition of the album

Studio album by Harry Connick Jr.
- Released: August 25, 2009
- Recorded: 2008–June 2009
- Studios: The Music Shed, New Orleans; Capitol Studios, Hollywood
- Genres: Jazz, vocal jazz, pop, rock
- Length: 49:42
- Label: Columbia
- Producers: Clive Davis (executive,); Tracey Freeman, Harry Connick Jr.

Harry Connick Jr. chronology
What a Night! A Christmas Album (2008)	Your Songs (2009)	In Concert on Broadway (2011)

Alternative cover
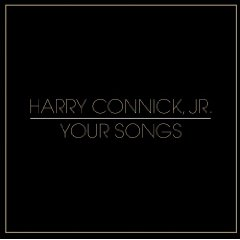
- Vinyl LP Album Cover

Singles from Your Songs
- 1. "(They Long to Be) Close to You" Released: August 25, 2009; 2. "Just the Way You Are" Released: September 22, 2009

Professional ratings
Review scores
Source	Rating
AllMusic	3.5/5 stars
Billboard	(favorable)
Daily Music Guide	3.5/5 stars
The Advocate	(favorable)

Your Songs is a studio album by American jazz singer Harry Connick Jr. that was released by Columbia. It was released first in the United States on a limited edition double vinyl LP on August 25, 2009, then on CD on September 22.

== Background ==
Most of the songs were chosen by record producer Clive Davis, who aimed towards classic, familiar songs, as contemporary as possible. Davis had expressed an interest in working with Connick. Connick had an idea of bringing in a famous arranger for the album, but Davis suggested Connick do the arrangements himself.

The song "Bésame Mucho" was suggested by Connick's father, Harry Connick Sr., a former district attorney for the Parish of Orleans. They sang a duet on the album New Orleans...My Home Town (1998). Branford and Wynton Marsalis contribute to the album. Both are multiple Grammy winners. Both are childhood friends of Connick. Trumpeter Wayne Bergeron and guitarist Bryan Sutton also play on the album.

Connick said in a radio interview that "Smile" was dedicated to a girl named Nicola. She and her mother attended one of Connick's shows in Paris, France, several years before. Nicola was seven at the time, and Connick took her on a tour of Paris. They stood under the Eiffel Tower. Although she was blind, she knew where she was and had a smile on her face.

== Promotion ==
On August 4, 2009, Connick had an album listening party in New York City, hosted by Sony Music chief creative executive Clive Davis. Amongst those in attendance were Alan Cumming, Bernadette Peters, Brian Williams, Kelli O'Hara, Rachael Ray, Mario Cantone, Rosie Perez, and David Hyde Pierce.

A number of public listening events were held, from August 24–30, 2009. Connick did not attend the exclusive vinyl listening events, which were held in cities such as Orlando, Florida, Washington, D.C., Chicago, New York, Oakland, California, New Orleans, West Babylon, New York, and Los Angeles.

He made a number of TV appearances in September and October 2009. In September he appeared on Oprah on the 25th, then on Today (28th), The View (29th), and Late Show with David Letterman and Imus in the Morning on September 30. In October, he was a guest on the Today on the 1st, Rachael Ray in the week of October 5, and he set out to a week-long promotional tour in Australia from October 2 through to 9th, which included a visit to Hey Hey It's Saturday, and an appearance as a guest judge on Australian Idol on October 11, 2009.

== Release ==
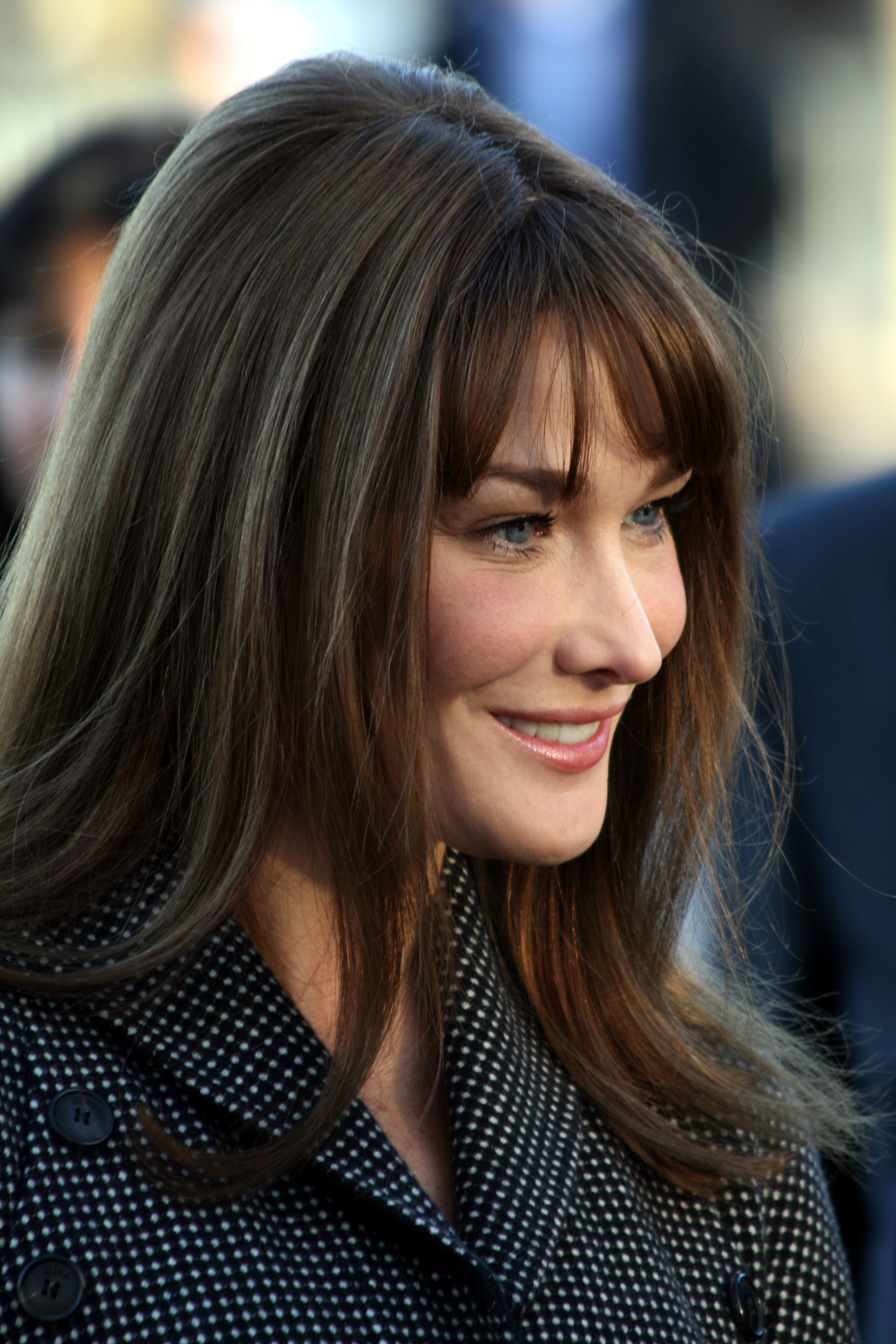
French First Lady Carla Bruni

The album was released first in the United States on a limited edition double vinyl LP on August 25, 2009. The CD album was released on September 22.

The first single of the album was Burt Bacharach and Hal David's "(They Long to Be) Close to You", and it was released exclusively on Amazon.com on August 25, 2009.

After the U.S. release, Connick was in Paris, France in September 2009, to record a song with French First Lady Carla Bruni. She and Connick's wife, Jill Goodacre, both former supermodels, are long time friends. The duet is a French and Italian version of "And I love her", written by Lennon–McCartney. The duet is released as a bonus track on European editions of Your Songs.

As of 2013, the album has sold 396,000 copies in United States.

== Tour ==
A worldwide concert tour began in January 2010.

=== Tour dates ===
List of concerts, showing date, city, and venue
Date	City	Venue
North America (Early 2010)
January 23, 2010	Indio, California	Fantasy Springs Casino
January 24, 2010	Temecula, California	Pechanga Resort & Casino
January 26, 2010	Santa Barbara, California	Arlington Theatre
January 27, 2010	Friant, California	Table Mountain Casino
January 28, 2010	San Diego	Copley Symphony Hall
February 11, 2010	Fort Myers, Florida	Barbara B. Mann Performing Arts Hall
February 12, 2010	Clearwater, Florida	Ruth Eckerd Hall
February 13, 2010	Melbourne, Florida	King Center for Performing Arts
February 14, 2010	Jacksonville, Florida	Florida Theatre
February 16, 2010	Durham, North Carolina	Durham Performing Arts Center
February 17, 2010	Charleston, West Virginia	The Clay Center
February 18, 2010	Baltimore	The Lyric Opera House
February 19, 2010	Virginia Beach, Virginia	Sandler Center for the Performing Arts
February 23, 2010	Nashville, Tennessee	Ryman Auditorium
February 25, 2010	Huntsville, Alabama	Von Braun Center
February 26, 2010	Birmingham, Alabama	Alabama Theatre
February 27, 2010	Memphis, Tennessee	Cannon Center
February 28, 2010	Indianapolis	Murat Theatre
New Zealand (2010)
March 13, 2010	Auckland	Civic Theatre
March 14, 2010	Wellington	Michael Fowler Centre
March 16, 2010	Christchurch	Town Hall
Australia (2010)
March 19, 2010	Melbourne	Plenary
March 20, 2010	Adelaide	Her Majesty's Theatre
March 22, 2010	Sydney	Opera House
March 25, 2010	Brisbane	Convention Centre
March 27, 2010	Perth	Kings Park
Europe (2010)
May 13, 2010	Paris	Salle Pleyel
May 14, 2010	Paris	Salle Pleyel

Asia (2010)

- May 16 – Abu Dhabi Hall – Abu Dhabi, United Arab Emirates

Europe (2010)

- May 18 – Istanbul Kongre Merkezi – Istanbul, Turkey
- May 21 – Mawazine Festival – Rabat, Morocco

North America (2010)

- June 9 – The View, New York
- June 10 – Late Show with David Letterman, New York
- June 11 – Fox Theatre, St. Louis
- June 12 – PNC Pavilion, Cincinnati
- June 13 – Charlottesville Pavilion, Charlottesville, Virginia
- June 15 – The Filene Center at Wolf Trap Vienna, Virginia
- June 16 – Blumenthal Performing Arts Center, Charlotte, North Carolina
- June 18 – Peace Center for the Performing Arts, Greenville, South Carolina
- June 19 – Chastain Park Amphitheatre, Atlanta
- June 21 – Morris Performing Arts Center, South Bend, Indiana
- June 22–23 – Chicago Theatre, Chicago
- June 25 – Jazz Aspen Snowmass, Aspen, Colorado
- June 27 – Toronto Jazz Festival – Canon Theatre, Toronto

Asia (2010)

- July 2 – USA Pavilion, National Day Gala Performance, Shanghai, China

North America (2010)

- July 15–31 Neil Simon Theatre, New York
- August 13–14 – Hollywood Bowl, Hollywood, California
- September 17 – Grand Theatre at Grand Sierra Resort Reno, Nevada
- September 18 – The Mountain Winery, Saratoga, California
- September 19 – Monterey Jazz Festival – Jimmy Lyons Stage, Monterey, California
- September 21 – Wente Vineyards, Livermore, California
- September 22 – Britt Pavilion, Jacksonville, Oregon
- September 24 – Queen Elizabeth Theatre, Vancouver, BC
- September 25 – Chateau Ste. Michelle, Woodinville, Washington
- September 26 – Chateau Ste. Michelle, Woodinville, Washington
- September 28 – Schnitzer Concert Hall, Portland, Oregon
- September 29 – Borgata Hotel Casino & Spa, Atlantic City, New Jersey
- September 30 – The Academy of Music, Philadelphia, Pennsylvania

North America (2011)

- March 25 – WinStar World Casino, Thackerville, Oklahoma
- March 26 – Long Center for the Performing Arts, Austin, Texas
- March 28 – River Center, Baton Rouge, Louisiana
- March 29 – Jones Hall, Houston
- April 1 – IP Casino Resort & Spa, Biloxi, Mississippi
- April 2 – IP Casino Resort & Spa, Biloxi, Mississippi
- April 4 – Mahalia Jackson Theater, New Orleans
- April 7 – Van Wezel Performing Arts Hall, Sarasota, Florida
- April 8 – Ruth Eckerd Hall, Clearwater, Florida
- April 9 – Mizner Park Amphitheater at Downtown Boca, Boca Raton, Florida
- April 10 – Bob Carr Performing Arts Centre, Orlando, Florida
- April 11 – Philharmonic Center for the Arts, Naples, Florida
- April 20 – Count Basie Theatre, Red Bank, New Jersey
- April 21 – Count Basie Theatre, Red Bank, New Jersey
- April 22 – MGM Grand Theater at MGM Grand at Foxwoods, Mashantucket, Connecticut
- April 26–30 – The Colonial Theatre, Boston

== Broadway ==
He held a series of concerts, called Harry Connick Jr. in Concert on Broadway, at the Neil Simon Theatre on Broadway, from July 15 to July 31, 2010. The concerts on July 30 and 31 were filmed live, and aired on PBS on March 2, 2011 for a "Great Performances" special on the concerts. These were also released on video, CD/DVD and album in March 2011, as Harry Connick Jr.: In Concert on Broadway.

Harry Connick Jr. won an Emmy Award in the category Outstanding Music Direction for Harry Connick Jr. In Concert on Broadway.

The In Concert on Broadway album is nominated for a Grammy Award for Best Traditional Pop Vocal Album.

== Track listing ==
No.	Title	Writer(s)	Length
1.	"All the Way" (featuring Branford Marsalis)	Jimmy Van Heusen, Sammy Cahn	3:33
2.	"Just the Way You Are"	Billy Joel	3:48
3.	"Can't Help Falling in Love With You" (featuring Wynton Marsalis)	George David Weiss, Hugo Peretti, Luigi Creatore	3:15
4.	"And I Love Her"	John Lennon, Paul McCartney	3:12
5.	"(They Long to Be) Close to You" (featuring Leroy Jones)	Burt Bacharach, Hal David	3:16
6.	"Bésame Mucho"	Consuelo Velázquez	4:11
7.	"The Way You Look Tonight"	Jerome Kern, Dorothy Fields	3:45
8.	"First Time Ever I Saw Your Face"	Ewan MacColl	3:23
9.	"Your Song"	Elton John, Bernie Taupin	3:35
10.	"Some Enchanted Evening"	Oscar Hammerstein, Richard Rodgers	4:07
11.	"And I Love You So"	Don McLean	3:30
12.	"Who Can I Turn To (When Nobody Needs Me)"	Leslie Bricusse, Anthony Newley	3:52
13.	"Smile"	Charlie Chaplin, John Turner, Geoffrey Parsons	3:11
14.	"Mona Lisa"	Jay Livingston, Ray Evans	3:08

=== Barnes & Noble Exclusive Version ===
No.	Title	Writer(s)	Length
15.	"Killing Me Softly"	Charles Fox, Norman Gimbel	03:24

=== iTunes ===
No.	Title	Writer(s)	Length
15.	"All the Way" (music video)	Jimmy Van Heusen, Sammy Cahn

=== European Editions ===
No.	Title	Writer(s)	Length
15.	"And I Love Her" (featuring Carla Bruni)	Lennon–McCartney

=== Japan Edition ===
No.	Title	Writer(s)	Length
15.	"Killing Me Softly"	Charles Fox, Norman Gimbel	03:24
16.	"Who's Sorry Now"	Ted Snyder, Bert Kalmar, Harry Ruby
17.	"Answer Me My Love"	Gerhard Winkler, Fred Rauch, Carl Sigman

=== Deluxe Limited Edition CD/DVD package ===
- US only. Available through hconnickjr.com.
- DVD includes behind the scenes footage, and the "(They Long To Be) Close To You" music video

No.	Title	Writer(s)	Length
15.	"Who's Sorry Now"	Ted Snyder, Bert Kalmar, Harry Ruby
16.	"Answer Me My Love"	Gerhard Winkler, Fred Rauch, Carl Sigman

== Personnel ==
- Harry Connick Jr. – vocals, piano
- Branford Marsalis – saxophone (track #1)
- Wynton Marsalis – trumpet (track #3)
- Leroy Jones – trumpet (track #5)
- Ben Wolfe – bass
- Arthur Latin II – drums
- Bryan Sutton – guitar
- Roger Ingram – trumpet
- Wayne Bergeron – trumpet
- John Fumo – trumpet
- Warren Lunning – trumpet
- The Honolulu Heartbreakers – vocals

== Release history ==
Country	Date	Label	Format
United States	August 25, 2009	Columbia	LP
United States	September 22, 2009	Columbia	CD, digital download
Canada	September 22, 2009	Sony	CD, digital download
Australia	September 25, 2009	Sony	CD, digital download
United Kingdom	October 26, 2009	Columbia	CD, digital download
Denmark	October 26, 2009	Sony	CD, digital download
France	October 26, 2009	Columbia, Sony	CD, digital download
Norway	October 26, 2009	Sony	CD, digital download
Finland	October 28, 2009	Sony	CD, digital download
Netherlands	October 28, 2009	Sony	CD, digital download
Germany	October 30, 2009	Sony	CD, digital download
Japan	November 11, 2009	Sony Music Japan	CD

== Chart positions ==
Chart (2009)	Peak position
Australian Albums Chart	9
Belgian Wallonia Chart	71
Canadian Albums (Billboard)	11
French Albums Chart	51
Irish Albums Chart	40
New Zealand Top Albums	10
UK Albums Chart	28
US Billboard 200	8
US Top Jazz Albums (Billboard)	1

== Awards and nominations ==
Your Songs was nominated for a Grammy Award, in the category Best Traditional Pop Vocal Album. This was announced on Wednesday, December 2, 2009. The 52nd Grammy Awards took place on January 31, 2010 in Los Angeles. The award went to Michael Bublé for his Michael Bublé Meets Madison Square Garden.
