= Note by Note: The Making of Steinway L1037 =

- Directed by: Ben Niles
- Produced by: Ben Niles, Geoff O'Brien
- Distributed by: Argot Pictures
- Release date: November 2007
- Running time: 81 minutes
- Language: English

Note by Note: The Making of Steinway L1037 is an independent documentary film that follows the construction of a Steinway concert grand piano (model D-274) over a year, from the search for wood in Alaska to a display at Manhattan's Steinway Hall. The documentary film received its U.S. theatrical premiere at New York's Film Forum in November 2007.

The pianists Pierre-Laurent Aimard, Kenny Barron, Bill Charlap, Harry Connick, Jr., Hélène Grimaud, Hank Jones, Lang Lang and Marcus Roberts are testing and talking about Steinway pianos in the film. The Steinway founder's great-grandchild Henry Z. Steinway talks about the company's history.

== Critical reception ==
Critics gave the documentary film positive reviews. Review aggregator Rotten Tomatoes reports that 90% of critics gave the film positive reviews based on 21 reviews.
