= Moses Hogan =

American composer and choral arranger (1957–2003)

Moses George Hogan
- Born: March 13, 1957; New Orleans, U.S.
- Died: February 11, 2003 (aged 45)
- Education: Oberlin Conservatory of Music, Louisiana State University
- Occupations: Classical band player, composer, arranger

Moses George Hogan (March 13, 1957 – February 11, 2003) was an American composer and arranger of choral music. He was best known for his settings of spirituals. Hogan was a pianist, conductor, and arranger of international renown. His works are celebrated and performed by high school, college, church, community, and professional choirs today. Over his lifetime, he published 88 arrangements for voice, eight of which were solo pieces.

== Biography ==
Born in New Orleans, Hogan lived with five siblings and his parents, who gave their children a passion for music. He was an accomplished pianist by the age of nine. The family attended the A.L. Davis New Zion Baptist Church. Hogan's father, of the same name, was a bass singer in the church choir while Hogan's uncle, Edwin B. Hogan, was the Minister of Music and organist. His mother, Gloria Hogan, was a nurse.

Hogan was musically educated from a young age, first enrolling in Xavier University Junior School of Music. In his sophomore year of high school, he was accepted to New Orleans Center for Creative Arts High School and was in its first graduating class of 1975.

Hogan was awarded a full scholarship to the Oberlin Conservatory of Music, where he studied piano and graduated in 1979 with a Bachelor of Music degree. Immediately after graduation, he began graduate studies at the Juilliard School of Music, which he did not complete, and later went to study classical music in Vienna. During his piano performance years, Hogan won several competitions including first place at the 28th Annual Kosciuszko Foundation Chopin Competition in New York. He returned to Louisiana State University, where he was offered the opportunity to work for his doctorate but decided not to pursue it.

In 1980, he formed the New World Ensemble and began arranging choral music. In 1993, he founded the Moses Hogan Chorale and the following year published his first arrangement, "Elijah Rock". The choir was invited to sing at the 1996 World Choral Symposium in Sydney, Australia.

In 1997, he founded the Moses Hogan Singers; their first album was released in 2002.

He died from a brain tumor on February 11, 2003.

== Achievements ==
- Founder and conductor of the Moses Hogan Chorale and the Moses Hogan Singers
- 1st place in the 28th annual "Kosciuszko Foundation Chopin Competition" in New York
- Appointed artist in residence at Loyola University New Orleans in 1993
- Arranged and performed several compositions for the 1995 PBS documentary The American Promise
- Recorded and conducted several arrangements with the Mormon Tabernacle Choir
- Critically acclaimed by The New York Times and Gramophone magazine
- Brother of Phi Mu Alpha Sinfonia fraternity

== Arrangements ==
- "Abide with Me"
- "Ain't That Good News"
- "Amen"
- "Any How"
- "A Spiritual Reflection"
- "Basin Street Blues"
- "The Battle of Jericho"
- "Cert'nly Lawd"
- "Climbin' Up the Mountain"
- "Daniel, Daniel, Servant of the Lord"
- "De Blin' Man Stood on De Road an' Cried"
- "Deep River"
- "Didn't My Lord Deliver Daniel?"
- "Do Lord, Remember Me"
- "Done Made My Vow to the Lord"
- "Don't You Mourn"
- "Down by the Riverside"
- "Elijah Rock"
- "Ev'ry Time I Feel the Spirit"
- "Ezekiel Saw de Wheel"
- "Fix Me, Jesus"
- "Give Me Jesus"
- "Glory, Glory, Glory to the Newborn King"
- "Go Down Moses"
- "God's Gonna Set This World on Fire"
- "Good News, The Chariot's Comin'"
- "Go Tell It on the Mountain"
- "Great Day"
- "Hear My Prayer"
- "He Never Said A Mumblin' Word"
- "He's Got the Whole World in His Hands"
- "His Light Still Shines"
- "Hold On!"
- "Hold Out Your Light"
- "I Am His Child"
- "I Can Tell the World"
- "I Couldn't Hear Nobody Pray"
- "I Got a Home In-A Dat Rock"
- "I Got a Robe"
- "I Have a Dream"
- "I Know The Lord's Laid His Hands On Me"
- "I'm Gonna Sing 'Till the Spirit Moves in My Heart"
- "I'll Make The Difference"
- "I Stood on the River of Jordan"
- "I Surrender All"
- "I Want God's Heaven To Be Mine"
- "I Want Jesus To Walk With Me"
- "I Want To Be Ready"
- "I Want To Thank You, Lord"
- "Jesus Lay Your Head in the Window"
- "Joshua Fit the Battle of Jericho"
- "Let the Heaven Light Shine On Me"
- "Let Us Break Bread Together"
- "Lift Every Voice for Freedom"
- "Like a Mighty Stream"
- "Lily of the Valley"
- "Little David, Play On Your Harp"
- "Lord, I Want To Be A Christian"
- "Mister Banjo"
- "Music Down in My Soul"
- "My God Is So High"
- "My Good Lord's Done Been Here"
- "My Lord, What a Morning"
- "My Soul's Been Anchored in the Lord"
- "No Hidin' Place"
- "Mary Don't You Weep"
- "Old Time Religion"
- "O Magnify the Lord"
- "Only What You Do For Christ Will Last"
- "Plenty Good Room"
- "Ride On, King Jesus"
- "Ride The Chariot"
- "Rise An' Shine"
- "Somebody's Knockin' at Yo' Door"
- "Sometimes I Feel Like a Motherless Child"
- "Soon-Ah Will Be Done"
- "Stand By Me"
- "Standing in the Need of Prayer"
- "Steal Away"
- "Surely He Died on Calvary"
- "Swing Low, Sweet Chariot"
- "There is a Balm in Gilead"
- "There's a Man Goin' Around"
- "This is My Country"
- "This Little Light of Mine"
- "Trashin' the Camp"
- "Two Hymn Settings"
- "Wade in the Water"
- "Walk Together Children"
- "We Shall Walk Through the Valley in Peace"
- "Were You There?"
- "Who Built the Ark?"
- "Witness"
- "You Better Min' How You Talk"

== Holiday ==
On November 20, 1999, a holiday in Hogan's honor was established as Negro Spiritual/Moses Hogan Chorale Day.

== Discography ==
- Ev'ry Time I Feel the Spirit – 1991, with countertenor Derek Lee Ragin and the New World Ensemble (Chamber Choir), New Orleans
- Voices – soundtrack to the 1995 PBS documentary, An American Promise
- The Moses Hogan Choral Series 2003: This Little Light of Mine
- Give Me Jesus – performed by the Moses Hogan Singers/produced EMI Virgin Records
- An American Heritage of Spirituals – performed by the Mormon Tabernacle Choir/conducted by Albert McNeil and Moses Hogan
- Deep River
- The Moses Hogan Choral Series 2002
- Lift Every Voice for Freedom, a collection of American folk songs, poems, hymns, songs of faith and patriotic songs
- This Little Light of Mine: Moses Hogan Choral Series 2003

== Songbooks ==
- Feel the Spirit, author, Vol. 1, Mar 2008
- Feel the Spirit, author, Vol. 2, Jul 2008
- Oxford Book of Spirituals, editor, 1914 to 2001
- Ain't That Good News, author, Nov 2005
- The Deep River Collection, author, August 2000
