= To See You =

Studio album by Harry Connick Jr.
- Released: November 11, 1997
- Recorded: August 4–10, 1997
- Studios: Capitol, Hollywood, California
- Length: 75:19
- Label: Columbia
- Producer: Tracey Freeman

Harry Connick Jr. chronology
Star Turtle (1995)	To See You (1997)	Come by Me (1999)

Professional ratings
Review scores
Source	Rating
AllMusic	4/5 stars
Entertainment Weekly	B+

To See You is an album by the American artist Harry Connick Jr., released in 1997. It is an album of love songs, recorded with a symphony orchestra.

"The inspiration for this was a flight attendant, really," Connick says. He added, "She asked if I had any romantic records, and I thought maybe it was time to do a romantic album."

Connick toured the United States and Europe with a full symphony orchestra backing him and his piano in each city. As part of his tour, he played at the Nobel Peace Prize Concert in Oslo, Norway, with his final concert of that tour in Paris being recorded for a St. Valentine's Day special on PBS in 1998.

== Track listing ==
All songs are written, arranged and orchestrated by Harry Connick Jr.

No.	Title	Length
1.	"Let Me Love Tonight"	10:07
2.	"To See You" (appears in the compilation album Songs from the Heart.)	3:58
3.	"Let's Just Kiss"	7:34
4.	"Heart Beyond Repair"	8:06
5.	"Once"	6:05
6.	"Learn to Love" (appears in the movie Kissing a Fool)	4:42
7.	"Love Me Some You"	8:05
8.	"Much Love"	6:35
9.	"In Love Again"	9:06
10.	"Loved by Me"	11:01
Total length:		75:19

== Musicians ==
- Harry Connick Jr – vocals, piano
- Reginald Veal – double bass
- Charles Gould – tenor saxophone
- Arthur "Bam Bam" Latin – drums
- Symphony orchestra

== Charts ==
To See You made the first position in the Jazz charts in 1997, and was number 53 on the Billboard 200. It peaked at number 123 on the Australian ARIA Charts.

== Certifications ==
Region	Certification	Certified units/sales
United States (RIAA)	Gold	500,000^{^}
^{^} Shipments figures based on certification alone.
