= All These People =

Single by Harry Connick Jr. (feat. Kim Burrell)

from the album Oh my NOLA
- Released: August 29, 2006
- Recorded: 2006
- Length: 4:12
- Label: Columbia
- Songwriter: Harry Connick Jr.

"All These People" is the first single from Harry Connick Jr.'s 2007 album Oh my NOLA, and the single was released on iTunes on August 29, 2006. Music and lyrics by Harry Connick Jr.

The lyrics were inspired by the suffering Connick witnessed when he visited New Orleans in the days immediately following Hurricane Katrina. The song is all about the people who were left stranded at the Ernest N. Morial Convention Center. Each verse of the song is describing what he saw as he was led by a man he had met on the street earlier that day, named Darryl.

There were two dead bodies Connick saw when he first arrived at the convention center. Featured singer Kim Burrell asked that her voice specifically represent them. Burrell also asked that a final verse be added for her to sing, which Connick wrote in the studio.

Harry Connick Jr.'s favorite part of the performance is when Kim Burrell improvises the line 'come see about me,' which, he says "was all those folks wanted that day, someone to come and see about them."

All proceeds from sale of the song will benefit New Orleans Habitat Musicians' Village.
