= The Happy Elf =

- DVD cover
- Written by: Andrew Fishman; Scott Landis
- Directed by: John Rice
- Starring: Rob Paulsen; Harry Connick, Jr. Carol Kane; Mickey Rooney; Kevin Michael Richardson; Mae Whitman; Lewis Black
- Narrated by: Harry Connick, Jr.
- Theme music composer: Harry Connick, Jr.
- Country of origin: United States
- Original language: English

Production
- Producers: Scott D. Greenberg; Sidney Clifton; Natasha Abrahams; Karen Bailey; Ted Rogers; William L. Arance; Harry Connick Jr.
- Editor: Yoel Frohlich
- Running time: 45 minutes
- Production companies: HC Productions; Film Roman; DKP Studios; IDT Entertainment

Original release
- Network: NBC
- Release: December 2, 2005

The Happy Elf is a 2005 animated Christmas television special based on Harry Connick Jr.'s song of the same name. The special is narrated by Connick and stars the voices of Rob Paulsen, Carol Kane, Lewis Black, Kevin Michael Richardson and Mickey Rooney. The animation was provided by Film Roman, an IDT Entertainment company, known for animating The Simpsons. The Happy Elf originally aired on NBC on December 2, 2005.

== Plot ==
Eubie is a cheerful elf who works in Santa's workshop at the North Pole. While reviewing the Naughty and Nice Lists, Eubie discovers that every child in the town of Bluesville is naughty and decides to investigate. Bluesville is a gloomy town surrounded by cliffs, where sunlight is scarce and the people are generally unhappy. The mayor tells Eubie that Bluesville produces non-flammable coal and agrees to erect a Christmas tree in the town square if Eubie can find a new use for it.

Eubie meets a girl named Molly, who takes him to a Smile League Of Bluesville (SLOB) meeting. Molly dismisses Eubie's ideas, prompting him to think of a new plan, but he is suddenly taken to the North Pole. As punishment for violating the rules, Santa takes away Eubie's hat, stripping him of his magic. With encouragement from his friend Gilda, Eubie returns to Bluesville while wearing her hat and polishes the cliffs surrounding the town. Unfortunately, their efforts are discovered when their mutual friend, Derek, grows suspicious and informs Norbert, the head elf.

After finishing their punishment of cleaning the workshop, Eubie and Gilda receive a sincere apology from Derek. To make amends, Derek assists Eubie in fulfilling his goal of making Bluesville a happier place. When the sun next shines on the town, the polish makes the cliffs sparkle, and joy abounds. Molly presents a shining piece of coal to the mayor, leading to a celebration and the establishment of a tree in the town square. In recognition of their good deeds, Santa chooses Eubie, Gilda, and Derek to be his sleigh crew, and Bluesville is renamed Joyville.

== Cast ==
- Rob Paulsen as Eubie
- Harry Connick Jr. as Lil' Farley
- Carol Kane as Gilda
- Mickey Rooney as Santa Claus
- Kevin Michael Richardson as Derek, Tucker, Mayor, Toady
- Mae Whitman as Molly
- Lewis Black as Norbert
- Candi Milo as Curtis
- Rory Thost and Liliana Mumy as Brother and Sister

== Soundtrack ==
Some DVDs come with a free soundtrack:

1. "The Happy Elf" - 03:43 - vocal track, sung by Harry Connick, Jr.
2. "Smile on Christmas Day" - 01:00 - vocal track, sung by Rob Paulsen
3. "Bluesville" - 01:34 - vocal track, sung by Kevin Michael Richardson
4. "Lil' Farley's 'Happy Elf'" - 00:22
5. "Old Santa Claus" - 02:25
6. "Eubie and Friends Pole Adventure" - 00:43
7. "Gingerbread House Test" - 00:46
8. "Eubie's Toy Car Test" - 00:36
9. "Coffee Shop Theme" - 00:56
10. "Department of Naughty and Nice" - 01:18
11. "Norbert's Orders" - 00:33
12. "Eubie's Naughty & Nice Tally" - 02:15
13. "Eubie Lands in Bluesville" - 00:59
14. "Bluesville Street Theme" - 01:31
15. "Molly and Friends Coal Toss" - 02:09
16. "Down Town Theme" - 01:05
17. "S.L.O.B. Meeting" - 01:27
18. "'Try'" - 01:33
19. "Molly and Gang's Christmas Mission" - 02:40
20. "Santa's Elves Wrap Party" - 00:38
21. "Santa Getting Ready for Xmas" - 00:26
22. "Mayor Gives the Town a Tree" - 01:03
23. "'Bluesville' Reprise" - 01:21
24. "Lil' Farley's 'Happy Elf' Reprise" - 01:05
25. "'Happy Elf' Wrap" - 00:19

The official reference recording for the live theatrical show was recorded in Scranton, PA in partnership with the Scranton Cultural Center at the Masonic Temple in 2013.

== Stage adaptation ==
The holiday special has been adapted into a full-length stage musical. Andrew Fishman has reworked the book, with music and lyrics by Connick who has added five new songs for the musical, for example "That Magic Hat". The show premiered at Coterie Theatre at Crown Center in Kansas City, Missouri on November 13, 2007 to generally positive reviews. It received a fully produced workshop at the Adventure Theatre, at the Robert E. Parilla Performing Arts Center at Montgomery College, Rockville, Maryland, from November 12–28, 2010, with a cast that features Michael Rupert. In 2012 The Happy Elf was reworked by Connick and on December 1 premiered in a version prepared for publication in Bethlehem, PA at the Charles Brown Ice House under the direction of Michael Melcher, Executive Director.

The Scranton Cultural Center at the Masonic Temple, in Scranton, Pennsylvania produced and premiered the final illustrative staging of the musical on December 19, 2014 for a two-week run prior to its publication.
