= Harry Connick Jr. =

American musician and actor (born 1967)

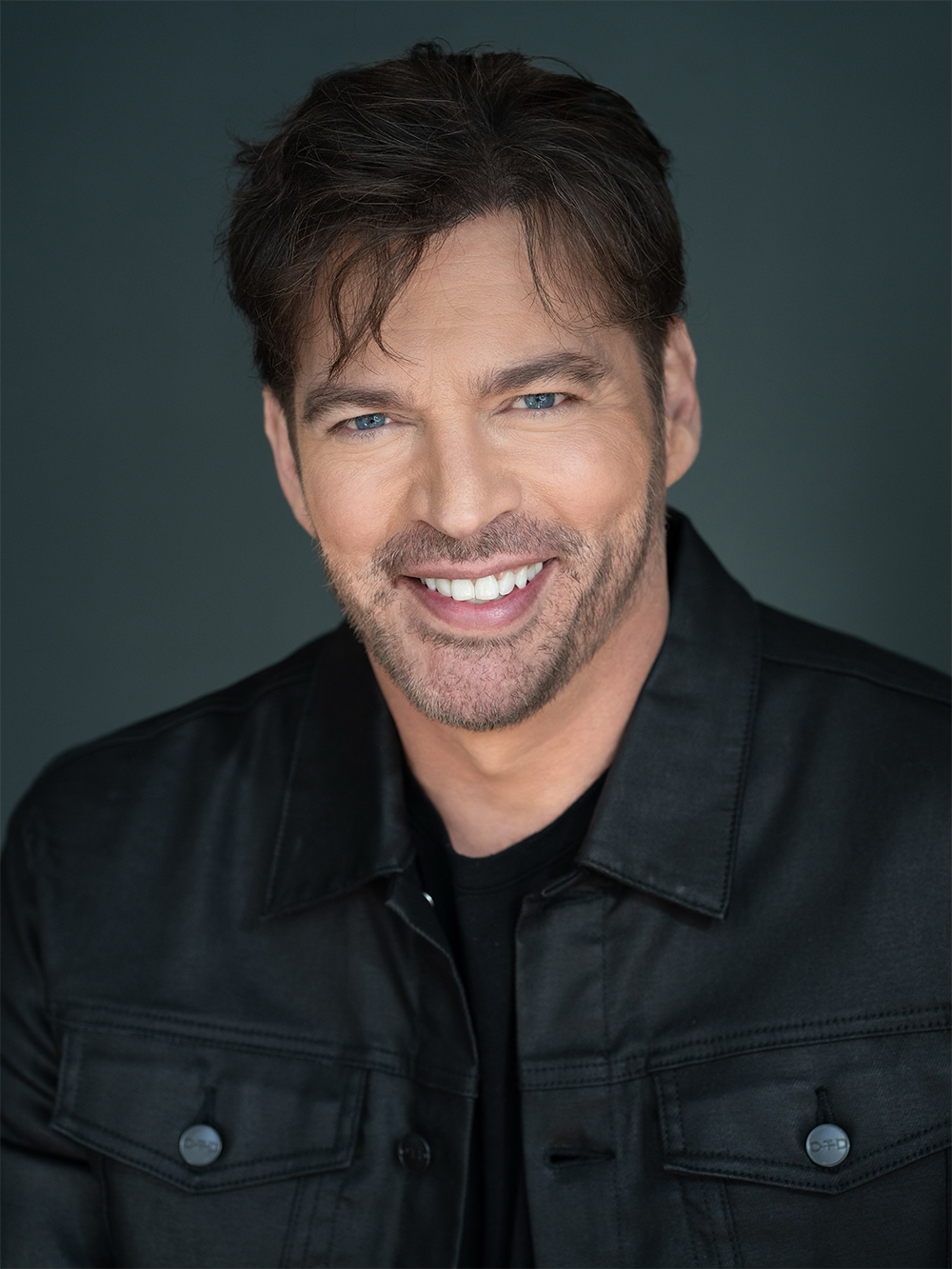
- Connick in 2023/Photo by Georgia Connick
- Born: Joseph Harry Fowler Connick Jr. September 11, 1967 (age 58); New Orleans, Louisiana, U.S.
- Occupations: Singer; composer; actor; television host
- Years active: 1977–present
- Spouse: Jill Goodacre (m. 1994)
- Children: 3
- Father: Harry Connick Sr.
- Relatives: Patrick Connick (cousin)
- Musical career
- Genres: Traditional pop; easy listening; big band; jazz-funk; jazz; show tunes; swing; blue-eyed soul
- Instruments: Vocals; piano
- Labels: Columbia Records; Verve; Marsalis Music
- Website: harryconnickjr.com

Joseph Harry Fowler Connick Jr. (born September 11, 1967) is an American singer, pianist, composer, actor, and former television host. As of 2019, he has sold over 30 million albums worldwide. Connick is ranked among the top 60 best-selling male artists in the United States by the Recording Industry Association of America, with 16 million in certified sales. He has had seven top 20 U.S. albums, and ten number-one U.S. jazz albums, earning more number-one albums than any other artist in U.S. jazz chart history as of 2009.

Connick's best-selling album in the United States is his Christmas album When My Heart Finds Christmas (1993). His highest-charting album is Only You (2004), which reached No. 5 in the U.S. and No. 6 in Britain. He has won three Grammy Awards and two Emmy Awards. He played Leo Markus, the husband of Grace Adler (played by Debra Messing) on the NBC sitcom Will & Grace from 2002 to 2006.

Connick began his acting career playing a tail gunner in the World War II film Memphis Belle (1990). He played a serial killer in Copycat (1995) before being cast as a fighter pilot in the blockbuster Independence Day (1996). Connick's first role as a leading man was in Hope Floats (1998) with Sandra Bullock. He also lent his voice to the animated cult classic The Iron Giant (1999). His first thriller film since Copycat was Basic (2003) with John Travolta. Additionally, he played a violent ex-husband in Bug (2006), and starred in two romantic comedies: P.S. I Love You (2007) with Oscar-winner Hilary Swank, and New in Town (2009) with Oscar-winner Renée Zellweger. In 2011, he appeared in the family film Dolphin Tale as Dr. Clay Haskett and in its 2014 sequel.

== Early life ==
Harry Connick Jr. was born and raised in New Orleans. His mother, Anita Frances Livingston (née Levy; 1926–1981), was a lawyer and judge in New Orleans. His father, Harry Connick Sr. (1926–2024), was the district attorney of Orleans Parish from 1973 to 2003. He has an older sister named Suzanna.

His parents also owned a record store. Connick's father was a Roman Catholic of Northern Irish descent, while his mother, who died of ovarian cancer when he was 13 years old, was Jewish and from New York; his part-Jewish heritage would later inspire him to play Jewish doctor Leo on Will & Grace. In addition to his career as a prosecutor, Connick Sr. also had a career performing weekly gigs at French Quarter Clubs. Connick and his sister, Suzanna, were raised in the Lakeview neighborhood of New Orleans.

Connick began learning to play keyboards at age three, playing publicly at age five, and recording with a local jazz band when he was ten. At the age of nine, Connick performed Beethoven's Piano Concerto No. 3 Opus 37 with the New Orleans Symphony Orchestra (now the Louisiana Philharmonic).

Later he played a duet with Eubie Blake at the Royal Orleans Esplanade Lounge in New Orleans. The song was "I'm Just Wild About Harry". It was recorded for a Japanese documentary called Jazz Around the World. The clip was also shown in a Bravo special called Worlds of Harry Connick, Junior in 1999. His musical talents were developed at the New Orleans Center for Creative Arts and under the tutelage of Ellis Marsalis Jr. and James Booker.

Connick attended Jesuit High School, Isidore Newman School, Lakeview School, and the New Orleans Center for Creative Arts, all in New Orleans. After an unsuccessful attempt studying jazz at Loyola University New Orleans as well as giving recitals in the classical and jazz piano programs at Loyola, he left the city. He lived at the 92nd Street YMHA in New York City while he was a student at Hunter College and the Manhattan School of Music.

There he met Columbia Records executive George Butler, who persuaded him to sign with the label. His first record, Harry Connick Jr., was mainly an album of instrumental standards. He soon acquired a reputation in jazz because of his regular performances at various high-profile New York City venues. His next album, 20, featured vocals and added to his success.

== Career ==
=== When Harry Met Sally..., success on charts and in movies ===
Connick's reputation was growing, and director Rob Reiner asked him to provide a soundtrack for his romantic comedy When Harry Met Sally... (1989), starring Meg Ryan and Billy Crystal. The soundtrack consisted of several standards, including "It Had to Be You", "Let's Call the Whole Thing Off" and "Don't Get Around Much Anymore". The soundtrack earned double-platinum status in the United States. Connick won his first Grammy Award for Best Jazz Male Vocal Performance for his work on the soundtrack.

Connick made his screen debut in Memphis Belle (1990), based on a true story about a B-17 Flying Fortress bomber crew in World War II. In that year, he began a two-year world tour. In addition, he released two albums in July 1990: the instrumental jazz trio album Lofty's Roach Soufflé and a big-band album of mostly original songs titled We Are in Love, which also went double platinum. We Are in Love earned him his second consecutive Grammy for Best Jazz Male Vocal.

"Promise Me You'll Remember", his contribution to the Godfather III soundtrack, was nominated for both an Academy Award and a Golden Globe Award in 1991. In a year of recognition, he was also nominated for an Emmy Award for Best Performance in a Variety Special for his PBS special Swinging Out Live, which was also released as a video. In October 1991, he released his third consecutive multi-platinum album, Blue Light, Red Light, on which he wrote and arranged the songs. Also in October 1991, he starred in Little Man Tate, directed by Jodie Foster, playing the friend of a child prodigy who goes to college.

In November 1992, Connick released 25, a solo piano collection of standards that again went platinum. He also re-released the album Eleven. Connick contributed "A Wink and a Smile" to the Sleepless in Seattle soundtrack, released in 1993. His multi-platinum album of holiday songs, When My Heart Finds Christmas, was the best-selling Christmas album in 1993.

=== Mid-1990s: funk ===
In 1994, Connick decided to branch out. He released She, an album of New Orleans funk that also went platinum. In addition, he released a song called "(I Could Only) Whisper Your Name" for the soundtrack of The Mask, starring Jim Carrey, which is his most successful single in the United States to date.

Connick took his funk music on a tour of the United Kingdom in 1994, an effort that did not please some of his fans, who were expecting a jazz crooner. Connick also went on a tour of China in 1995, playing at the Shanghai Center Theatre. The performance was televised live in China for what became known as the Shanghai Gumbo special. In his third film Copycat (1995), Connick played a serial killer who terrorizes a psychiatrist (played by Sigourney Weaver). The following year, he released his second funk album, Star Turtle, which did not sell as well as previous albums, although it did reach No. 38 on the charts. However, he appeared in the most successful movie of 1996, Independence Day, with Will Smith and Jeff Goldblum.

=== Late 1990s: Jazz and Hope Floats ===
For his 1997 release To See You, Connick recorded original love songs, touring the United States and Europe with a full symphony orchestra backing him and his piano in each city. As part of his tour, he played at the Nobel Peace Prize Concert in Oslo, Norway, with his final concert of that tour in Paris being recorded for a Valentine's Day special on PBS in 1998. He also continued his film career, starring in Excess Baggage (1997) opposite Alicia Silverstone and Benicio del Toro.

In May 1998, he had his first leading role in director Forest Whitaker's Hope Floats, with Sandra Bullock being the female lead. In 1999 he released Come By Me, his first album of big band music in eight years, and embarked on a world tour, visiting the United States, Europe, Japan, and Australia. In addition, he provided the voice of Dean McCoppin in the animated film The Iron Giant.

=== 2000–2002: Broadway debut, musicals, Will & Grace ===
Connick wrote the score for Susan Stroman's Broadway musical Thou Shalt Not, based on Émile Zola's novel Thérèse Raquin. The play premiered in 2001. His music and lyrics earned him a Tony Award nomination. He was also the narrator of the film My Dog Skip, released in that year.

In March 2001, Connick starred in a television production of South Pacific with Glenn Close; it was televised on the ABC network. He also starred in Mickey, a movie; John Grisham wrote the screenplay. In October 2001, he released two albums: Songs I Heard, featuring big band re-workings of children's show themes, and 30, featuring Connick on piano with guest appearances by several musical artists. Songs I Heard won Connick a Grammy for Best Traditional Pop Album; he toured performing songs from the album, holding matinees. At the performances each parent in attendance had to be accompanied by a child.

In 2002, he received a U.S. patent 6,348,648 for a "system and method for coordinating music display among players in an orchestra." Connick appeared as Grace Adler's boyfriend and later husband, Leo Markus on the NBC sitcom Will & Grace from 2002 to 2006.

=== 2003–2005: Connick on Piano and Only You ===
In July 2003, Connick released his first instrumental album in fifteen years, Other Hours Connick on Piano Volume 1. It was released on Branford Marsalis' new label Marsalis Music leading to a short tour of nightclubs and small theaters. Connick appeared in the film Basic. In October 2003, he released his second Christmas album, Harry for the Holidays; it went gold and reached No. 12 on the Billboard 200 albums chart. He also had a television special on NBC featuring Whoopi Goldberg, Nathan Lane, Marc Anthony, and Kim Burrell. Only You, his seventeenth album for Columbia Records, was released in February 2004. A collection of 1950s and 1960s ballads, Only You, was in the Top 10 on both sides of the Atlantic and was certified gold in the United States in March 2004. The Only You big band toured the U.S. and Australia, with a few stops in Asia. Harry for the Holidays was certified platinum in November 2004.

A music DVD Harry Connick Jr.‍—‌"Only You" in Concert was released in March 2004, after it had first aired as a Great Performances special on PBS. The special won him an Emmy Award for Outstanding Music Direction. The DVD received a Gold & Platinum Music Video‍—‌Long Form awards from the RIAA in November 2005.

An animated holiday special, The Happy Elf aired on NBC in December 2005; Connick was the composer, the narrator, and one of the executive producers. The show was released on DVD soon after. The holiday special was based on his original song The Happy Elf from his 2003 album Harry for the Holidays. Another album from Marsalis Music was recorded in 2005, Occasion : Connick on Piano, Volume 2, a duo album with Harry Connick Jr. on piano and Branford Marsalis on saxophone. A music DVD, A Duo Occasion was filmed at the Ottawa International Jazz Festival 2005 in Canada; it was released in November 2005.

He appeared in another episode of the Will & Grace sitcom in November 2005, he was in three more episodes in 2006.

=== 2006–2008: The Pajama Game, Bug, and P.S. I Love You ===
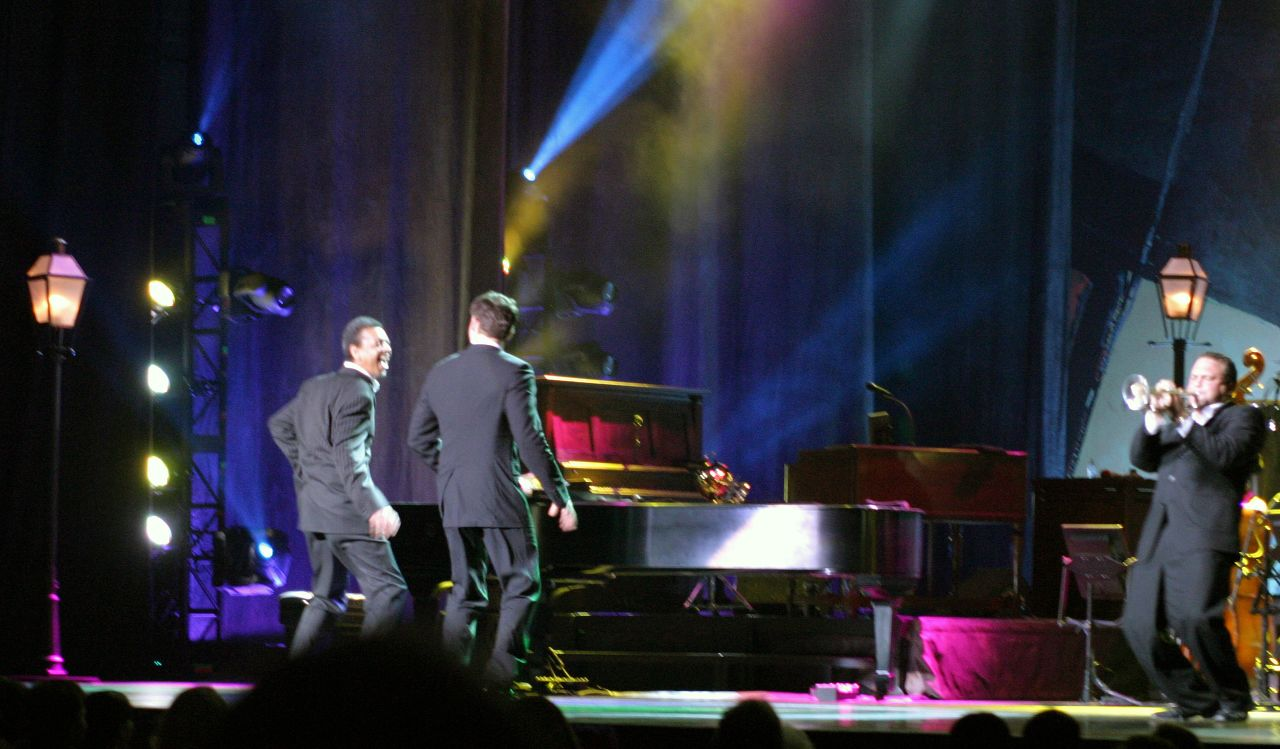
Harry Connick Junior in concert in Savannah, Georgia on February 27, 2007

Bug, a film directed by William Friedkin, is a psychological thriller filmed in 2005 starring Connick, Ashley Judd, and Michael Shannon. The film was released in 2007. He starred in the Broadway revival of The Pajama Game, produced by the Roundabout Theater Company, along with Michael McKean and Kelli O'Hara, at the American Airlines Theatre in 2006. It ran from February 23 to June 17, 2006; five benefit performances ran rom June 13 to 17. Connick's performance was highly acclaimed; David Rooney wrote in Variety, "With his handsome wholesomeness and those mellifluous Sinatra-esque pipes, it's hard to imagine a leading man more tailor-made for this 1954 show." The Pajama Game cast recording was nominated for a Grammy, after being released as part of Connick's double disc album Harry on Broadway, Act I.

He hosted The Weather Channel's miniseries 100 Biggest Weather Moments which aired in 2007. He was part of the documentary Note by Note: The Making of Steinway L1037, released in November 2007. He sat in playing piano on Bob French's 2007 album Marsalis Music Honors Series: Bob French. He appeared in the film P.S. I Love You, released in December 2007.

The third album in the Connick on Piano series, Chanson du Vieux Carré was released in 2007, and Connick received two Grammy nominations for the track "Ash Wednesday" for the Grammy awards in 2008. Chanson du Vieux Carré was released simultaneously with the album Oh, My NOLA. He toured North America and Europe in 2007, and toured Asia and Australia in 2008 as part of his My New Orleans Tour. Connick wrote two songs and did the arrangements for Kelli O'Hara's album which was released in May 2008; he also sang a duet on the recording. He was the featured singer at the Concert of Hope immediately preceding Pope Benedict XVI's mass at Yankee Stadium in April 2008. He had the starring role of Dr. Dennis Slamon in the Lifetime television film Living Proof (2008). His third Christmas album, What a Night!, was released in November 2008.

Connick has a vast knowledge of musical genres and vocalists, even gospel music. One of his favorite gospel artists is Stellar Award winner and Grammy nominated artist Kim Burrell of Houston. Chris Gray of the Houston Press said, "... when Harry Connick Jr. assembled a symphony orchestra for Pope Benedict XVI's appearance at Yankee Stadium in 2008, he wanted Burrell on vocals"

=== 2009–2011: New in Town and Your Songs ===
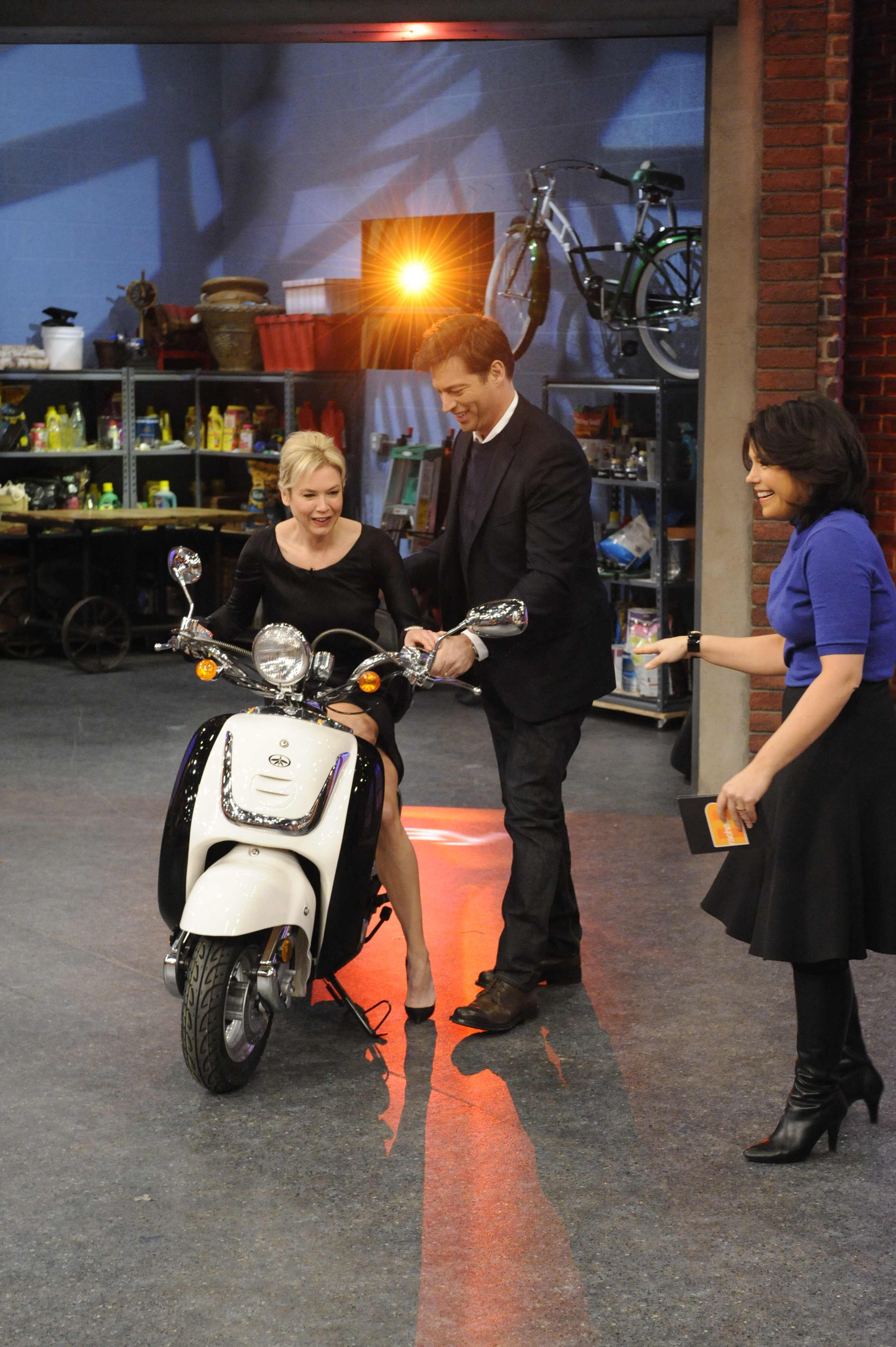
Harry Connick Junior and Renée Zellweger at the Rachael Ray show, January 30, 2009

The film New in Town starring Connick and Renée Zellweger began filming in January 2008; it was released in January 2009. Connick's album Your Songs was released on CD, September 22, 2009. In contrast to Connick's previous albums, this album is a collaboration with a record company producer, the multiple Grammy Award winning music executive Clive Davis.

Connick starred in the Broadway revival of On a Clear Day You Can See Forever, which opened at the St. James Theatre in November 2011 in previews. It closed in January 2012, after 29 previews and 57 performances.

Connick appeared on the May 4, 2010, episode of American Idol season 9, where he acted as a mentor for the top 5 finalists. He appeared again the next night on May 5 to perform "And I Love Her". In 2011, he appeared in the family film Dolphin Tale as Dr. Clay Haskett and in its 2014 sequel.

=== 2012–2019: Law & Order: Special Victims Unit, Harry, and Every Man Should Know ===
On January 6, 2012, NBC president Robert Greenblatt announced at the Television Critics Association winter press tour that Connick had been cast in a four-episode arc of NBC's long-running legal drama Law & Order: Special Victims Unit as new Executive ADA David Haden, a prosecutor who is assigned a case with Detective Olivia Benson (Mariska Hargitay).

On June 11, 2013, Connick released a new album of all original music titled Every Man Should Know. Connick debuted the title track live on the May 2, 2013, episode of American Idol and appeared on The Ellen DeGeneres Show the following week to discuss his new project. A 2013 US summer tour was announced in support of the album.

Connick returned to American Idol to mentor the top four of season 12. He performed "Every Man Should Know" on the results show the following night. Connick was on the judging panel for seasons 13, 14 and 15 of American Idol, airing in 2014 to 2016.

Angels Sing, a family Christmas movie released in November 2013 by Lionsgate, afforded Connick an onscreen collaboration with fellow musician Willie Nelson. The two wrote a special song exclusively for the movie. Shot in Austin, Texas, Angels Sing features actor/musicians Connie Britton, Lyle Lovett, and Kris Kristofferson and is directed by Tim McCanlies, who previously worked with Connick in The Iron Giant.

A one-hour weekday daytime talk show starring Connick called Harry debuted on September 12, 2016. The series ran until May 23, 2018. Connick was nominated for a Daytime Emmy as Outstanding Entertainment Talk Show Host for both years of the show.

In January 2019, it was announced that Connick was hired by piano instruction software company Playground Sessions as a video instructor.

On October 25, 2019, he released a new album of Cole Porter compositions rearranged by Connick himself, including "Anything Goes" and "You Do Something To Me." After selecting the songs, and writing and orchestrating the arrangements, he assembled and conducted the orchestra, which features his longtime touring band with additional horns and a full string section. Along with his album, Connick announced his return to Broadway on September 16, 2019, with Harry Connick Jr. — A Celebration of Cole Porter, a multimedia celebration of the Cole Porter songbook. The production was conceived and directed by Connick with the addition of theatrical and film elements accompanied by a company of dancers and an onstage orchestra. The production was revved for a five-day special presentation at the Metropolitan Opera House in January 2025.

=== 2020–present: Alone with My Faith and Annie ===
Connick released his new album Alone with My Faith on March 19, 2021. Connick retreated to his home studio during the COVID-19 lockdowns and emerged with an album of new music. He arranged all of the songs, played every instrument, and sang every part. In addition to the familiar, traditional songs, Connick wrote and recorded new tracks that tell the story of his experience coping during lockdown and feeling the full spectrum of emotions that came with it. Both the album cover and the music videos for "Amazing Grace" and "Alone With My Faith" were conceived and directed by Harry's daughter Georgia Connick. Alone With My Faith earned Connick his 16th career GRAMMY nomination for Best Roots Gospel Album as part of the 64th annual GRAMMY awards.

Connick joined the cast of Annie Live! as Sir Oliver "Daddy" Warbucks – opposite Taraji P. Henson's devious Miss Hannigan. The live production aired December 2, 2021, on NBC and also coincided with the release of the Annie Live! Cast Album – the original soundtrack of the NBC television event.

Connick Jr. was a judge in the 2023 revival of Australian Idol and the Australian version of The Piano, released in 2025. He starred as the main character John Allman in the 2024 Netflix film Find Me Falling.

Connick made his Carnegie Hall debut on May 22 and 23, 2026, with a performance of his symphonic composition, Babe: Elaboratio. The work is dedicated to his mother, who was nicknamed "Babe" and whose 100th birthday on that day he commemorated. Connick played the piano part, accompanied by Orchestra Victoria from Melbourne, conducted by Australian Jessica Gethin. B–A–B–E are the opening notes of the work. Connick also wrote an accompanying book, and a recording was released by Warner Classics; a documentary is to be released in 2027 with his three daughters' involvement – directed by Georgia, photography by Kate, Charlotte as associate producer.

== Touring Big Band members ==
The following musicians have toured as the Harry Connick Jr. Big Band since its inception in 1990:

- Piano and vocals – Harry Connick Jr.
- Drums – Shannon Powell, Duffy Jackson, Arthur Latin II (Winard Harper, Jeff "Tain" Watts – subs)
- Bass – Ben Wolfe, Neal Caine
- Guitar – Jonathan Dubose Jr., Evan Vidar (Bryan Sutton – subs)
- Piano, Keyboards – Harry Connick Jr., Howard Kaplan, Jonathan Batiste
- Lead trumpet – Roger Ingram (Dave Stahl, Walter White, Walt Johnson – subs)
- 2nd trumpet – Dan Miller, Derrick Gardner, Bijon Watson, Sal Cracchiolo (Earl Gardner, Greg Gisbert, Darryl Shaw – subs)
- 3rd trumpet – Jeremy Davenport, Joe Magnarelli, Mark Braud
- 4th trumpet – Leroy Jones, Mark Braud
- Lead alto saxophone – Brad Leali, Mike Smith, Jon Gordon, Ned Goold, Geoff Burke
- 2nd alto saxophone – Mark Sterbank, Will Campbell, Ned Goold
- 1st tenor saxophone – Jerry Weldon (Geoff Burke – sub)
- 2nd tenor saxophone – Jimmy Greene, Ned Goold
- Baritone saxophone – Dave Schumacher (Howard Johnson – sub)
- Clarinet – Louis Ford
- Lead trombone – Mark Mullins, John Allred, Jeff Bush
- 2nd trombone – Craig Klein, John Allred
- 3rd trombone – Lucien Barbarin, Craig Klein
- Bass trombone – Joe Barati
- Vocals – Jonathan Dubose Jr., Jonathan Batiste (The Honolulu Heartbreakers – subs)

== Connick and New Orleans, Hurricane Katrina ==
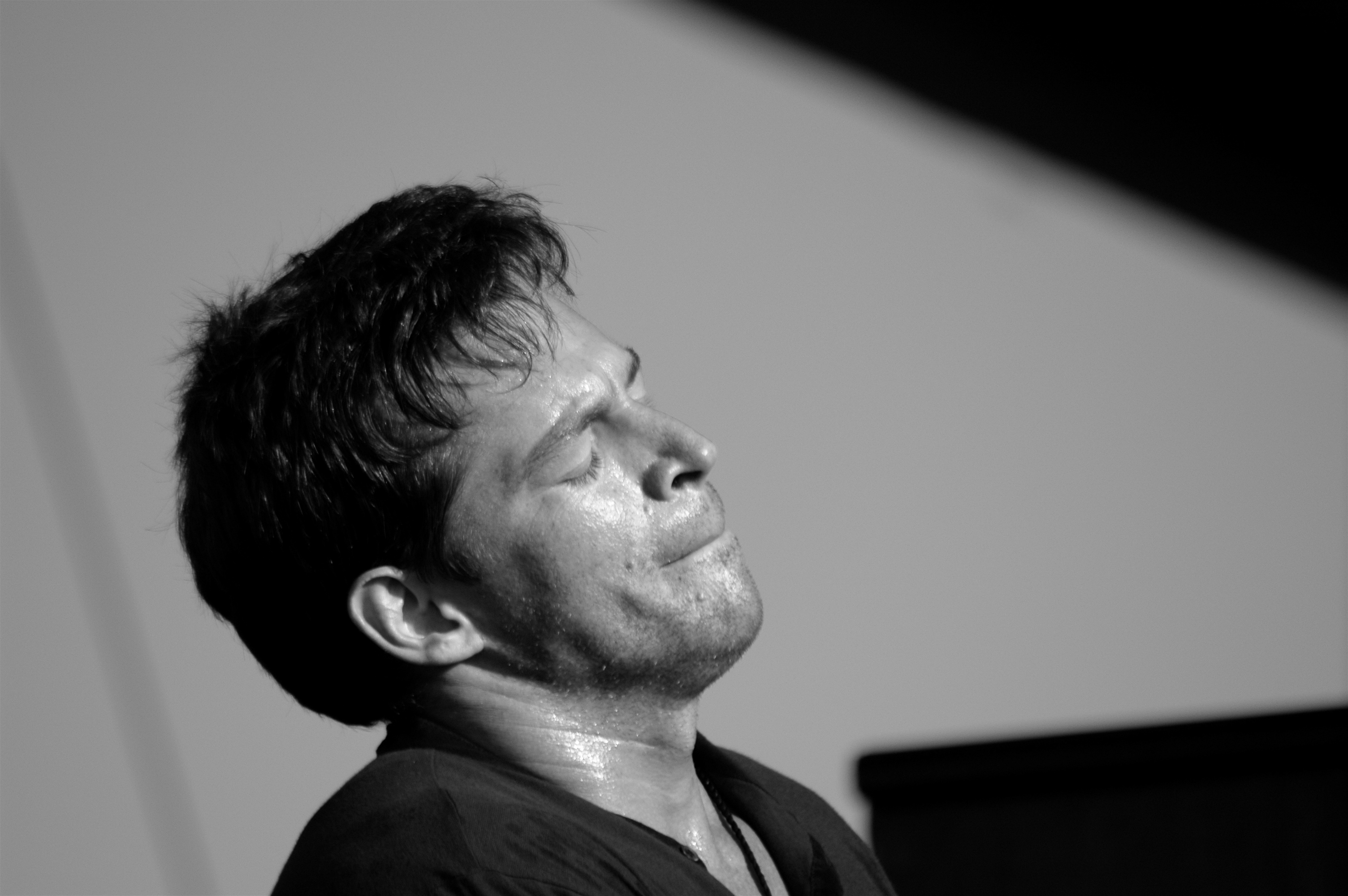
Connick at the New Orleans Jazz Fest 2007

Connick, a New Orleans native, is a founder of the Krewe of Orpheus, which is a music-based New Orleans krewe. Its name is derived from Orpheus of classical mythology. The Krewe of Orpheus has parades on St. Charles Avenue and Canal Street in New Orleans on Lundi Gras (Fat Monday)‍—‌, which is the day before Mardi Gras (Fat Tuesday).

On September 2, 2005, Connick helped organize and appeared in the NBC-sponsored live telethon concert, A Concert for Hurricane Relief, for relief in the wake of Hurricane Katrina. He spent several days touring the city to draw attention to the plight of citizens stranded at the Ernest N. Morial Convention Center and other places. At the concert he paired with host Matt Lauer and entertainers including Tim McGraw, Faith Hill, Kanye West, Mike Myers, and John Goodman.

On September 6, 2005, Connick was made the honorary chair of Habitat for Humanity's Operation Home Delivery, a long-term rebuilding plan for families who survived Hurricane Katrina in New Orleans and along the Gulf Coast. His actions in New Orleans earned him a Jefferson Award for Public Service.

Connick's album Oh, My NOLA, and Chanson du Vieux Carré were released in 2007; a tour called the My New Orleans Tour followed.

=== Musicians' Village ===
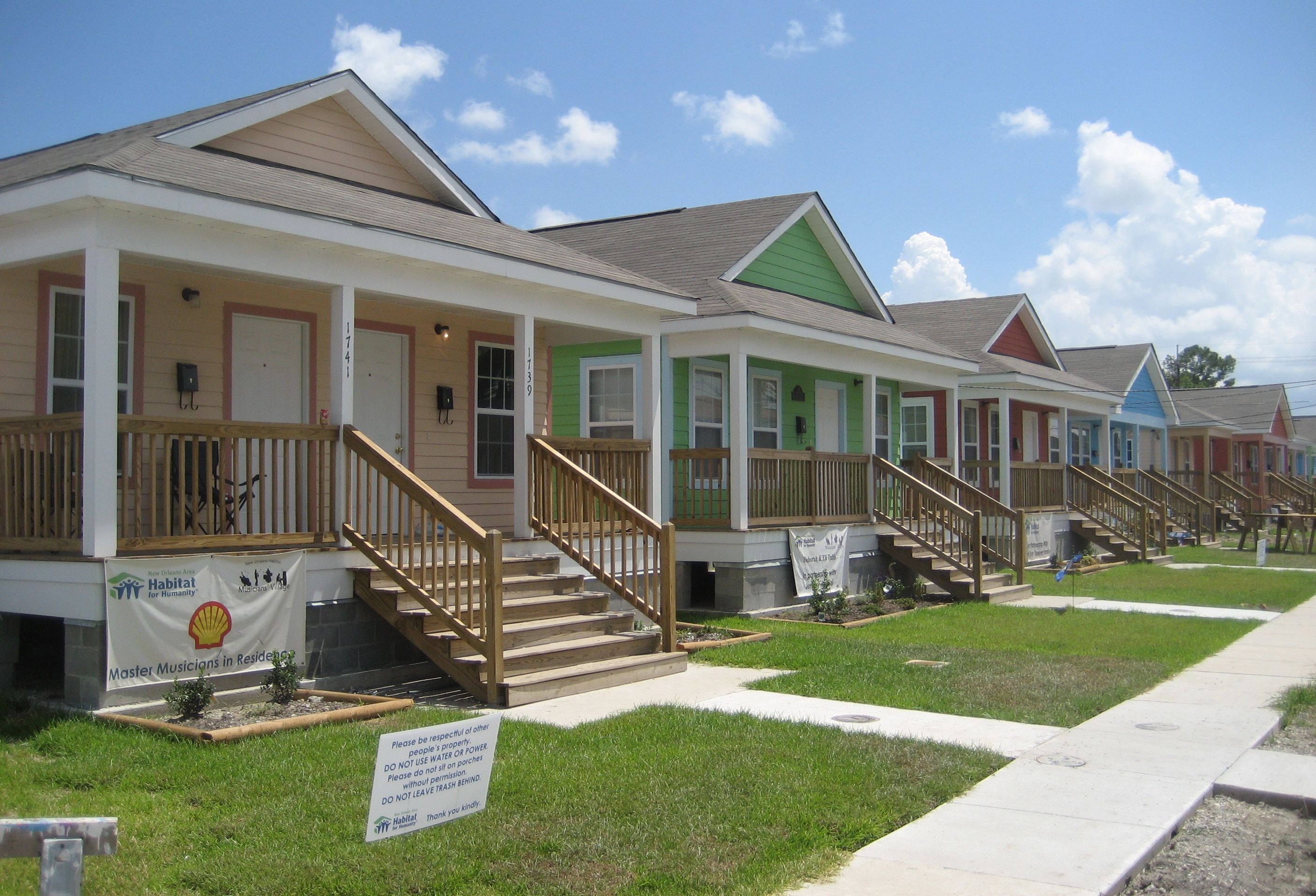
Musicians' Village in New Orleans, August 20, 2007

Connick and Branford Marsalis devised an initiative to help restore New Orleans' musical heritage. Habitat for Humanity and New Orleans Area Habitat for Humanity, working with Connick and Marsalis, announced on December 6, 2005, plans for a Musicians' Village in New Orleans. The village includes Habitat-constructed homes with the Ellis Marsalis Center for Music as the area's centerpiece. The Habitat-built homes provide musicians, and anyone else who qualifies, the opportunity to buy decent, affordable housing.

In 2012, Connick and Marsalis received the S. Roger Horchow Award for Greatest Public Service by a Private Citizen, an award given annually by Jefferson Awards.

== Personal life ==
Connick married former Victoria's Secret model Jill Goodacre, the daughter of sculptor Glenna Goodacre, at New Orleans' St. Louis Cathedral on April 16, 1994. The song "Jill" from his album Blue Light, Red Light (1991) is about her. They have three daughters named Georgia (born 1996), Sarah (born 1997), and Charlotte (born 2002). The family previously lived in both New Orleans and New Canaan, Connecticut. Connick briefly relocated his family to Sydney while he worked on Australian Idol in 2023, and all three of his daughters opted to remain there instead of returning to the U.S. with their parents when his work finished.

In December 1992, Connick was arrested by New York's Port Authority Police and charged with possessing a 9 mm pistol at JFK International Airport. After spending the day in jail, he agreed to record a video public service announcement warning against carrying a pistol in New York City without a license. The court agreed to drop all charges if he stayed out of trouble for six months.

Connick is a practicing Catholic, though he also identifies with his Jewish heritage. As a Louisiana native of mixed Irish Catholic and Jewish descent, he has also been described as a Creole. He is a supporter of his hometown NFL team, the New Orleans Saints. He was caught on camera in 2010 at Super Bowl XLIV, which the Saints won, by the television crew of The Ellen DeGeneres Show during the post-game celebrations. DeGeneres' mother Betty was on the sidelines watching the festivities when she spotted Connick in the stands sporting a Drew Brees jersey.

Connick wrote his daughter Sarah's debut song "A Lot Like Me" in 2011, which she released under the name Kate Connick, using her middle name professionally. The song was released to celebrate the debut of American Girl's newest historical characters Cecile Rey and Marie Grace Gardner. The proceeds from the song went to the Ellis Marsalis Center for Music.

== Discography ==
- Dixieland Plus (1977)
- Pure Dixieland (1979)
- Harry Connick Jr. (1987)
- 20 (1988)
- When Harry Met Sally (1989) [Soundtrack album]
- We Are in Love (1990)
- Lofty's Roach Soufflé (1990)
- Blue Light, Red Light (1991)
- 25 (1992)
- Eleven (1992) [Re-release of Pure Dixieland]
- When My Heart Finds Christmas (1993)
- Forever For Now (1993) [Compilation album released in the UK]
- She (1994)
- Star Turtle (1996)
- To See You (1997)
- Come by Me (1999)
- 30 (2001)
- Songs I Heard (2001)
- Thou Shalt Not (2002) [Cast recording]
- Other Hours: Connick on Piano, Volume 1 (2003)
- Harry for the Holidays (2003)
- Only You (2004)
- Occasion: Connick on Piano, Volume 2 (2005)
- Harry on Broadway, Act I (2006) [Cast recording]
- Oh, My NOLA (2007)
- Chanson du Vieux Carré : Connick on Piano, Volume 3 (2007)
- What a Night! A Christmas Album (2008)
- Your Songs (2009)
- In Concert on Broadway (2011) [Live album]
- Music from The Happy Elf: Connick on Piano, Volume 4 (2011)
- Smokey Mary (2013)
- Every Man Should Know (2013)
- That Would Be Me (2015)
- True Love: A Celebration of Cole Porter (2019)
- Alone with My Faith (2021)

== Filmography ==
=== Film ===
Year	Title	Role	Notes
1990	Memphis Belle	Sgt. Clay Busby	
1991	Little Man Tate	Eddie	
1995	Copycat	Daryll Lee Cullum	
1996	Independence Day	Captain Jimmy Wilder	
1997	Excess Baggage	Greg Kistler	
1998	Hope Floats	Justin Matisse	
1999	The Iron Giant	Dean McCoppin	Voice only
1999	Wayward Son	Jesse Banks Rhodes	
2000	My Dog Skip	Narrator	
2000	The Simian Line	Rick	
2001	South Pacific	Lt. Joseph Cable	
2001	Life Without Dick	Daniel Gallagher	
2003	Basic	Pete Vilmer	
2004	Mickey	Glen Ryan (Tripp Spence)	
2005	The Happy Elf	Lil' Farley (narrator)	
2006	Bug	Jerry Goss	
2007	P.S. I Love You	Daniel Connelly	
2008	Living Proof	Dr. Dennis Slamon	
2009	New in Town	Ted Mitchell	
2011	Dolphin Tale	Clay Haskett	
2013	Angels Sing	Michael Walker	
2014	Dolphin Tale 2	Clay Haskett	
2021	Fear of Rain	John Burroughs	
2024	Find Me Falling	John Allman	

=== Television ===
Year	Title	Role	Notes
1992	Cheers	Russell Boyd	Episode: "A Diminished Rebecca with a Suspended Cliff"
1994	Ghostwriter	Himself	Episode: "What's Up with Alex?: Part 1"
1997	Action League Now!	Big Baby (voice)	Episode: "Rock-A-Big-Baby"
2002–2006, 2017	Will & Grace	Leo Markus	25 episodes
2004	Sesame Street	Himself	Episode: 4080
2008	This Old House	Himself	Episode: "New Orleans Project: Part 1"
2009	Hey Hey It's Saturday: The Reunion	Himself – guest judge	
2009	Australian Idol	Himself – guest judge	
2010	American Idol	Himself – guest mentor	
2012	Law & Order: Special Victims Unit	Executive A.D.A. David Haden	Episodes: "Official Story", "Father's Shadow", "Hunting Ground", and "Justice Denied"
2013	American Idol	Himself – guest mentor	
2014–2016	American Idol	Himself – judge	Seasons 13–15 with Jennifer Lopez and Keith Urban
2015	Repeat After Me	Himself	1 episode
2016–2018	Harry	Himself	164 episodes
2017	Kevin Can Wait	Himself	Episode: "Kenny Can Wait"
2021	American Idol	Himself – guest performer	Episode: Comeback Show
2021	Annie Live!	Daddy Warbucks	Television special
2023	Australian Idol	Himself – judge	Season 8 with Kyle Sandilands, Meghan Trainor and Amy Shark
2025	Piano (Australian version)	Himself – judge	Season 1 with Andrea Lam

Non-fictional appearances
Year	Title	Role	Notes
1990	Carly in Concert: My Romance	Guest artist	
1992	Super Bowl XXVI	Himself	Performed "The Star-Spangled Banner"
1993	The Harry Connick Jr. Christmas Special	Himself	CBS special
1996	Road Rules: USA – The Second Adventure	Himself	Cameo appearance
1998	Harry Connick Jr.: Romance in Paris	Himself	PBS special
1999	The Worlds of Harry Connick Jr.	Himself	
2001	Evening at Pops	Himself	
2003	Harry for the Holidays	Himself	NBC special
2004	Only You: In Concert	Himself	PBS special
2007	100 Biggest Weather Moments	Host	
2007	Note by Note: The Making of Steinway L1037	Himself	
2010	Daytona 500	Himself	Performed "The Star-Spangled Banner"
2013	World Series	Himself	Performed "The Star-Spangled Banner"
2017	Kentucky Derby	Himself	Performed "The Star-Spangled Banner"
2020	NFL Draft on ABC	Himself	Performed "The Star-Spangled Banner"

== Broadway ==
- 1990 An Evening with Harry Connick Jr. and His Orchestra (special, concert)
- 2001 Thou Shalt Not (Broadway Musical)‍—‌composer
- 2006 The Pajama Game (Broadway Musical)
- 2010 Harry Connick Jr.: In Concert on Broadway (special, concert)
- 2011 On a Clear Day You Can See Forever (Broadway Musical)
- 2019 Harry Connick, Jr. – A Celebration of Cole Porter (special, concert)

Awards and achievements
Preceded by Bill Conti for 75th Annual Academy Awards	Emmy Award for Outstanding Music Direction; 2004 for Only You: In Concert	Succeeded by Michael Kosarin for A Christmas Carol
Preceded by Harry Connick Jr. for When Harry Met Sally...	Grammy Award for Best Jazz Vocal Performance, Male; 1991 for We Are in Love	Succeeded by Take 6 for He Is Christmas
Preceded by Bobby McFerrin for Brothers	Grammy Award for Best Jazz Vocal Performance, Male; 1990 for When Harry Met Sally...	Succeeded by Harry Connick Jr. for We Are in Love
