= Bob French (jazz musician) =

American jazz drummer (1938–2012)

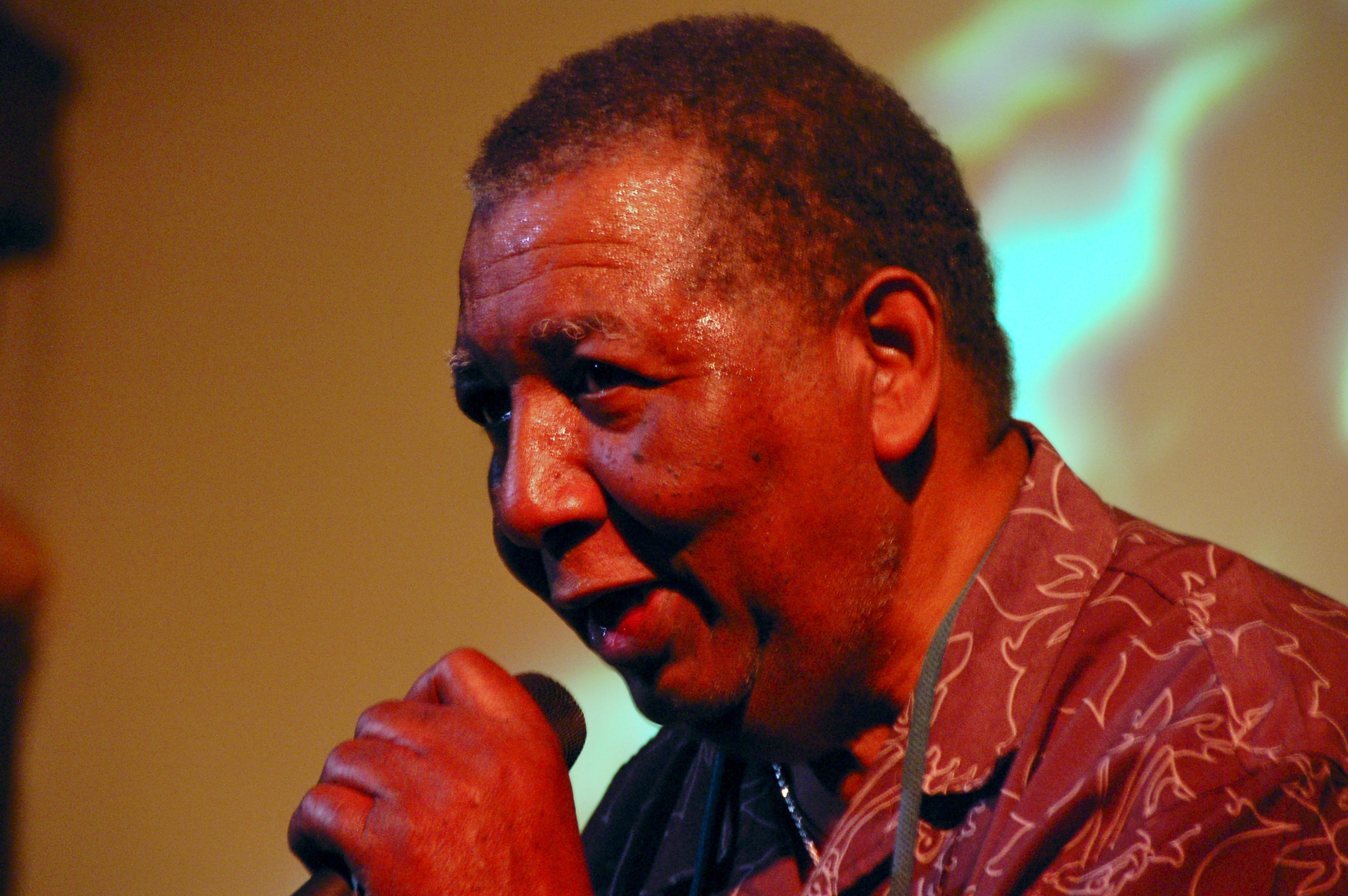
- French at Snug Harbor, New Orleans, in March 2008

Background information
- Born: Robert T. French Sr. December 27, 1937; New Orleans, Louisiana, U.S.
- Died: November 12, 2012 (aged 74)
- Genres: Jazz, R&B
- Occupations: Musician, songwriter, bandleader
- Instrument: Drums
- Years active: 1960s–2010s
- Label: Rounder
- Formerly of: The Tuxedo Jazz Band

Robert "Bob" French Sr. (December 27, 1937 – November 12, 2012) was an American jazz drummer and radio show host at WWOZ, from New Orleans, Louisiana. French led The Tuxedo Jazz Band from 1977 until his death in 2012. (The Tuxedo Jazz Band was formerly led by Oscar "Papa" Celestin and later by French's father, Albert "Papa" French from 1958 to 1977).

== Career ==
As a child French took drumming lessons from Louis Barbarin. He organized an R&B band in high school that included James Booker, Art Neville, Charles Neville (of The Neville Brothers), and Kidd Jordan, and Alvin Batiste. In the 1960s he recorded with Earl King, Snooks Eaglin and Fats Domino. He has also played and recorded with Dave Bartholomew, who is a relative on his mother's side. Bob French & Friends played often on Frenchmen Street at the D.B.A. nightclub. French's best-known gig was the long-running Monday night jam session at Donna's, across from Louis Armstrong Park.

French is interviewed on screen in the 2005 documentary film Make It Funky!, which presents a history of New Orleans music and its influence on rhythm and blues, rock and roll, funk and jazz.

== Death ==
French died on November 12, 2012, after a long illness. He was 74 years old.
