= Apollo 8 =

First crewed space mission to orbit the Moon

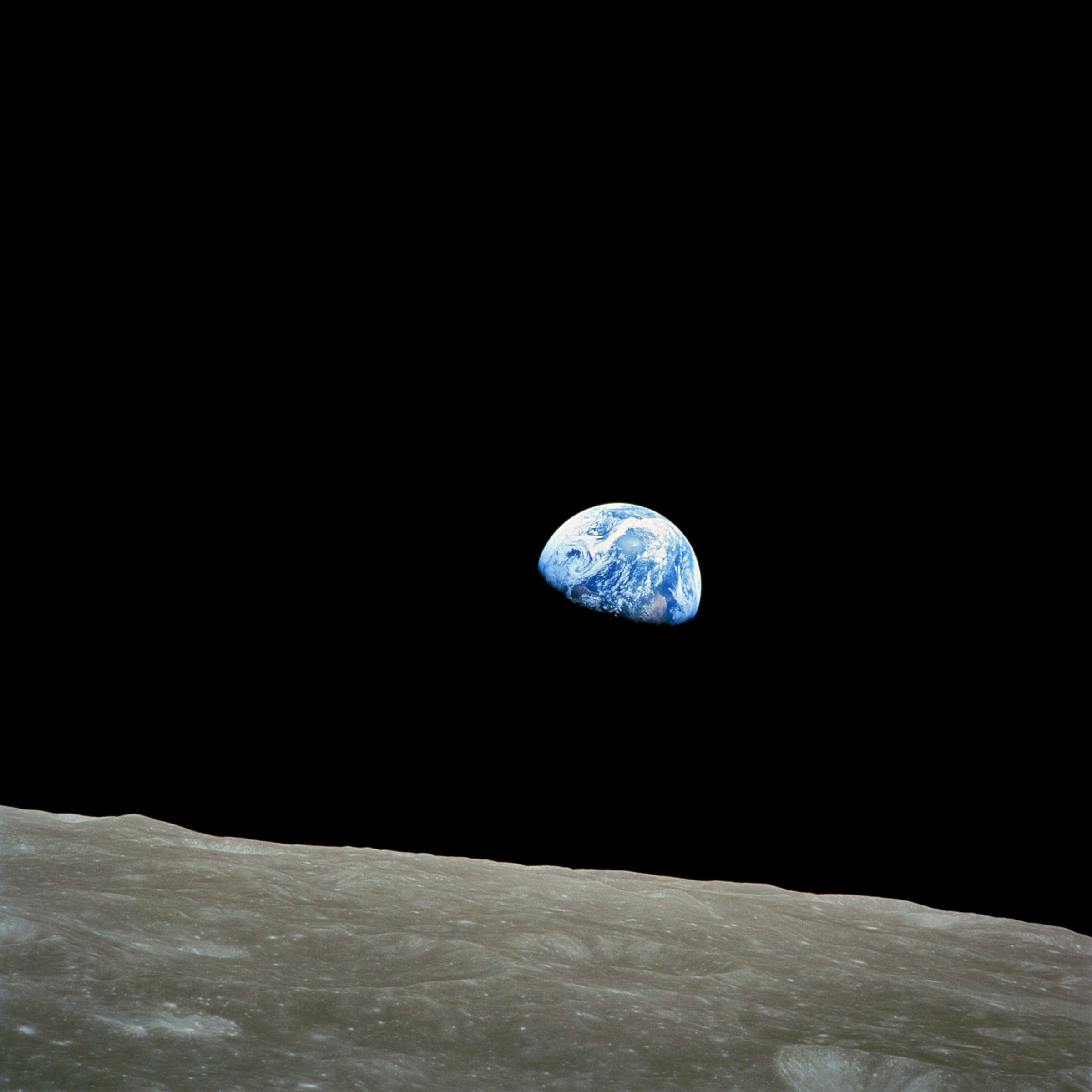
- Earthrise; Taken from Apollo 8 by William Anders
- Mission type: Crewed lunar orbital CSM flight (C')
- Operator: NASA
- COSPAR ID: 1968-118A
- SATCAT no.: 03626
- Mission duration: 6 days, 3 hours, 42 seconds

Spacecraft properties
- Spacecraft: Apollo CSM-103; Apollo LTA-B
- Manufacturer: North American Rockwell
- Launch mass: CSM: 28,870 kg (63,650 lb); CM:5,621 kg (12,392 lb); SM:23,250 kg (51,258 lb); SC/LM Adapter (jettisoned; connects LTA to CSM; not part of the CSM craft): 1,840 kg (4,060 lb); LTA (not part of CSM; fixed to rocket): 9,000 kg (19,900 lb)
- Landing mass: 4,979 kg (10,977 lb)

Crew
- Crew size: 3
- Members: Frank F. Borman II; James A. Lovell Jr.; William A. Anders
- Callsign: Apollo 8

Start of mission
- Launch date: December 21, 1968, 12:51:00 UTC (7:51 am EST)
- Rocket: Saturn V SA-503 (Note: Serial numbers were initially assigned by the Marshall Space Flight Center in the format "SA-5xx" (for Saturn-Apollo). By the time the rockets achieved flight, the Manned Spacecraft Center started using the format "AS-5xx" (for Apollo-Saturn).)
- Launch site: Kennedy, LC-39A

End of mission
- Recovered by: USS Yorktown
- Landing date: December 27, 1968, 15:51:42 UTC (5:51:42 am HST)
- Landing site: North Pacific Ocean, southwest of Hawaii, (8°8′N 165°1′W)

Orbital parameters
- Perigee altitude: 184.4 km (99.57 nmi; 114.6 mi)
- Apogee altitude: 185.2 km (99.99 nmi; 115.1 mi)
- Inclination: 32.15°
- Period: 88.19 minutes
- Epoch: December 21, 1968, ~13:02 UTC
- Revolution no.: 2

Lunar orbiter
- Spacecraft component: CSM
- Orbital insertion: December 24, 1968, 9:59:20 UTC
- Orbital departure: December 25, 1968, 6:10:17 UTC
- Orbits: 10

Orbital parameters
- Periselene altitude: 110.6 km (59.7 nmi; 68.7 mi)
- Aposelene altitude: 112.4 km (60.7 nmi; 69.9 mi)
- Inclination: 12°
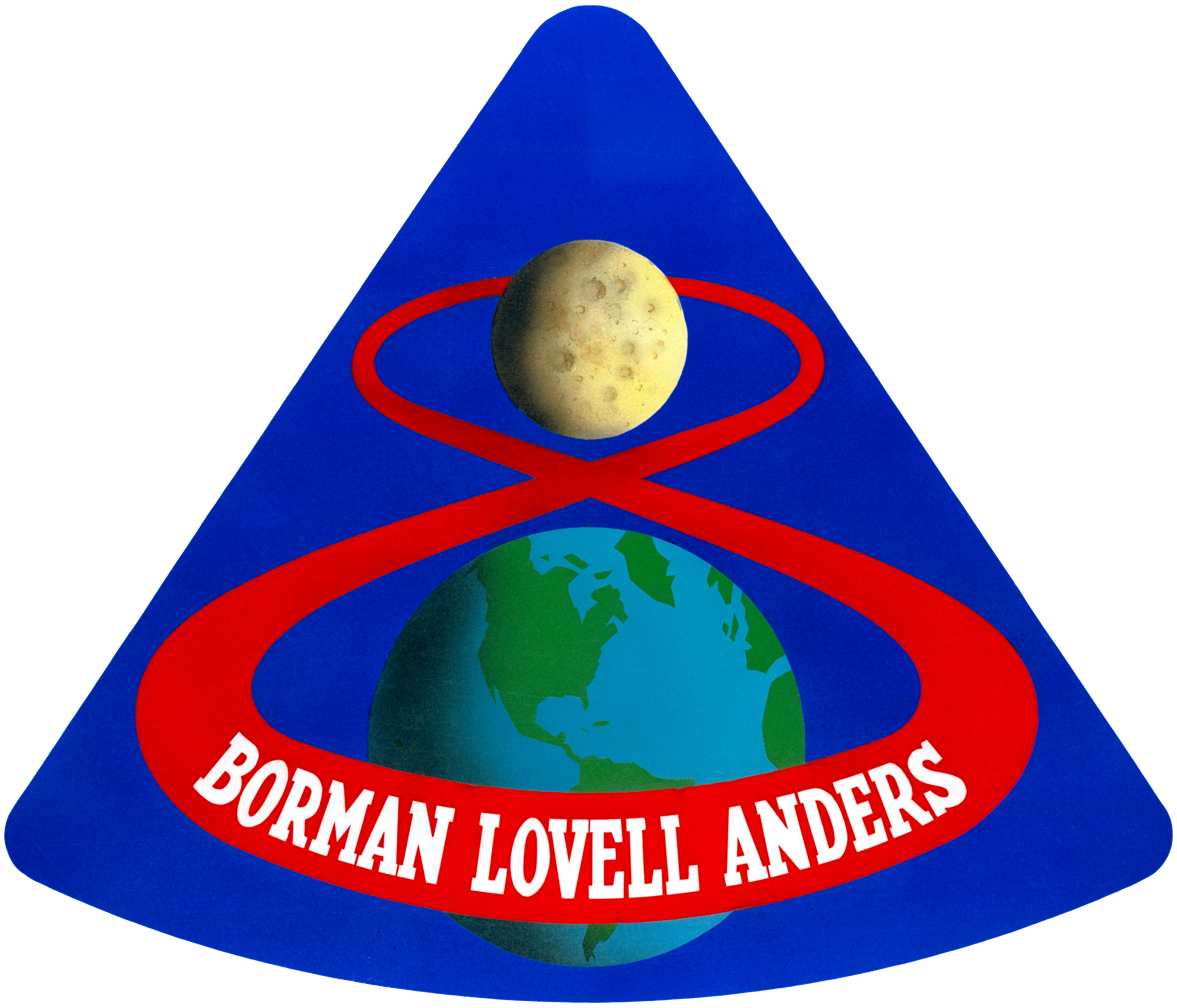
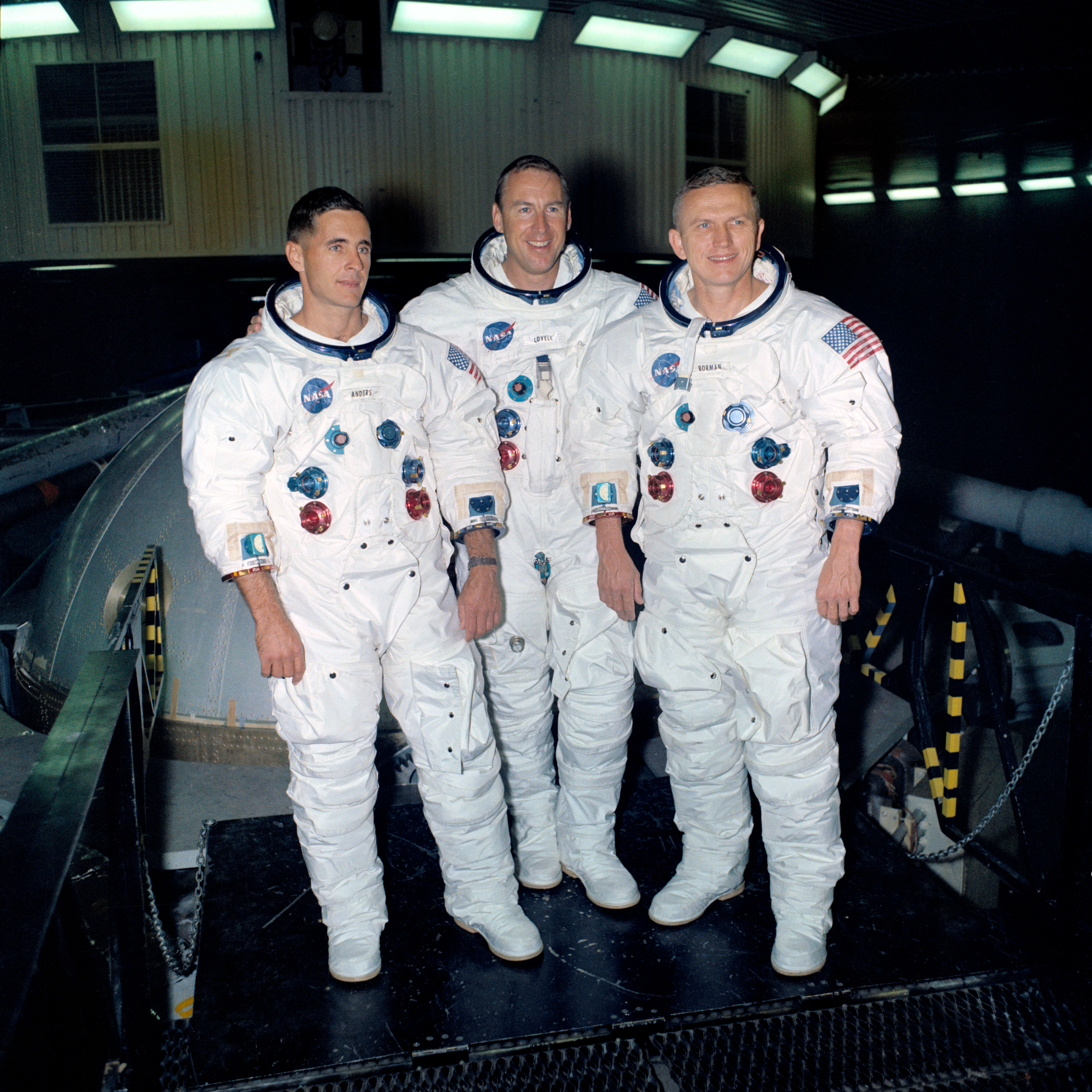
- Left to right: Anders, Lovell and Borman Apollo program

Apollo 8 (December 21–27, 1968) was the first crewed spacecraft to leave Earth's gravitational sphere of influence, and the first human spaceflight to reach the Moon. The crew orbited the Moon ten times without landing and then returned to Earth. The three astronauts—Frank Borman, Jim Lovell, and William Anders—were the first humans to see and photograph the far side of the Moon and an Earthrise.

Apollo 8 launched on December 21, 1968, and was the second crewed spaceflight mission flown in the United States Apollo space program (the first, Apollo 7, stayed in Earth orbit). Apollo 8 was the third flight and the first crewed launch of the Saturn V rocket. It was the first human spaceflight from the Kennedy Space Center, adjacent to Cape Kennedy Air Force Station in Florida.

Originally planned as the second crewed Apollo Lunar Module and command module test, to be flown in an elliptical medium Earth orbit in early 1969, the mission profile was changed in August 1968 to a more ambitious command-module-only lunar orbital flight to be flown in December, as the lunar module was not yet ready to make its first flight. Astronaut Jim McDivitt's crew, who were training to fly the first Lunar Module flight in low Earth orbit, became the crew for the Apollo 9 mission, and Borman's crew were moved to the Apollo 8 mission. This left Borman's crew with two to three months' less training and preparation time than originally planned, and replaced the planned Lunar Module training with translunar navigation training.

Apollo 8 took 68 hours to travel to the Moon. The crew orbited the Moon ten times over the course of twenty hours, during which they made a Christmas Eve television broadcast where they read the first ten verses from the Book of Genesis. At the time, the broadcast was the most watched TV program ever. Apollo 8's successful mission paved the way for Apollo 10 and, with Apollo 11 in July 1969, the fulfillment of U.S. president John F. Kennedy's goal of landing a man on the Moon before the end of the decade. The Apollo 8 astronauts returned to Earth on December 27, 1968, when their spacecraft splashed down in the northern Pacific Ocean and was recovered by the USS Yorktown. The crew members were named Time magazine's "Men of the Year" for 1968 upon their return.

== Background ==
Apollo 8 Manned Space Flight Report (1968) Official NASA information film reel.

In the late 1950s and early 1960s, the United States was engaged in the Cold War, a geopolitical rivalry with the Soviet Union. On October 4, 1957, the Soviet Union launched Sputnik 1, the first artificial satellite. This unexpected success stoked fears and imaginations around the world. It not only demonstrated that the Soviet Union had the capability to deliver nuclear weapons over intercontinental distances, it challenged American claims of military, economic, and technological superiority. The launch precipitated the Sputnik crisis and triggered the Space Race.

President John F. Kennedy believed that not only was it in the national interest of the United States to be superior to other nations, but that the perception of American power was at least as important as the actuality. It was therefore intolerable to him for the Soviet Union to be more advanced in the field of space exploration. He was determined that the United States should compete, and sought a challenge that maximized its chances of winning.

The Soviet Union had heavier-lifting carrier rockets, which meant Kennedy needed to choose a goal that was beyond the capacity of the existing generation of rocketry, one where the US and Soviet Union would be starting from a position of equality—something spectacular, even if it could not be justified on military, economic, or scientific grounds. After consulting with his experts and advisors, he chose such a project: to land a man on the Moon and return him to the Earth. This project already had a name: Project Apollo.

An early and crucial decision was the adoption of lunar orbit rendezvous, under which a specialized spacecraft would land on the lunar surface. The Apollo spacecraft therefore had three primary components: a command module (CM) with a cabin for the three astronauts, and the only part that would return to Earth; a service module (SM) to provide the command module with propulsion, electrical power, oxygen, and water; and a two-stage lunar module (LM), which comprised a descent stage for landing on the Moon and an ascent stage to return the astronauts to lunar orbit. This configuration could be launched by the Saturn V rocket that was then under development.

== Framework ==
=== Prime crew ===
Position	Astronaut
Commander	Frank F. Borman II; Second and last spaceflight
Command Module Pilot	James A. Lovell Jr. Third spaceflight
Lunar Module Pilot (Note: Lunar Module Pilot was the official title used for the third pilot position in Block II missions, regardless of whether the LM spacecraft was present or not.)	William A. Anders; Only spaceflight

The initial crew assignment of Frank Borman as Commander, Michael Collins as Command Module Pilot (CMP) and William Anders as Lunar Module Pilot (LMP) for the third crewed Apollo flight was officially announced on November 20, 1967. (Note: On a lunar mission, the Command Module Pilot was assigned the role of navigator, while the Lunar Module Pilot was assigned the role of flight engineer, responsible for monitoring all spacecraft systems, even if the flight did not include a lunar module. The navigational systems console was in front of the center seat and the environmental and electrical systems console in front of the right hand seat.) Collins was replaced by Jim Lovell in July 1968, after suffering a cervical disc herniation that required surgery to repair. This crew was unique among pre-Space Shuttle era missions in that the commander was not the most experienced member of the crew: Lovell had flown in space twice before, on Gemini VII and Gemini XII. This would also be the first case of a commander of a previous mission (Lovell, Gemini XII) flying as a non-commander. This was also the first mission to reunite crewmates from a previous mission (Lovell and Borman, Gemini VII).

=== Backup crew ===
Position	Astronaut
Commander	Neil A. Armstrong
Command Module Pilot	Edwin E. Aldrin Jr.
Lunar Module Pilot	Fred W. Haise Jr.

The backup crew assignment of Neil Armstrong as Commander, Lovell as CMP, and Buzz Aldrin as LMP for the third crewed Apollo flight was officially announced at the same time as the prime crew. When Lovell was reassigned to the prime crew, Aldrin was moved to CMP, and Fred Haise was brought in as backup LMP. Armstrong would later command Apollo 11, with Aldrin as LMP and Collins as CMP. Haise served on the backup crew of Apollo 11 as LMP and flew on Apollo 13 as LMP.

=== Support personnel ===
During Projects Mercury and Gemini, each mission had a prime and a backup crew. For Apollo, a third crew of astronauts was added, known as the support crew. The support crew maintained the flight plan, checklists, and mission ground rules, and ensured that the prime and backup crews were apprised of any changes. The support crew developed procedures in the simulators, especially those for emergency situations, so that the prime and backup crews could practice and master them in their simulator training. For Apollo 8, the support crew consisted of Ken Mattingly, Vance Brand, and Gerald Carr.

The capsule communicator (CAPCOM) was an astronaut at the Mission Control Center in Houston, Texas, who was the only person who communicated directly with the flight crew. For Apollo 8, the CAPCOMs were Michael Collins, Gerald Carr, Ken Mattingly, Neil Armstrong, Buzz Aldrin, Vance Brand, and Fred Haise.

The mission control teams rotated in three shifts, each led by a flight director. The directors for Apollo 8 were Clifford E. Charlesworth (Green team), Glynn Lunney (Black team), and Milton Windler (Maroon team).

=== Mission insignia and callsign ===
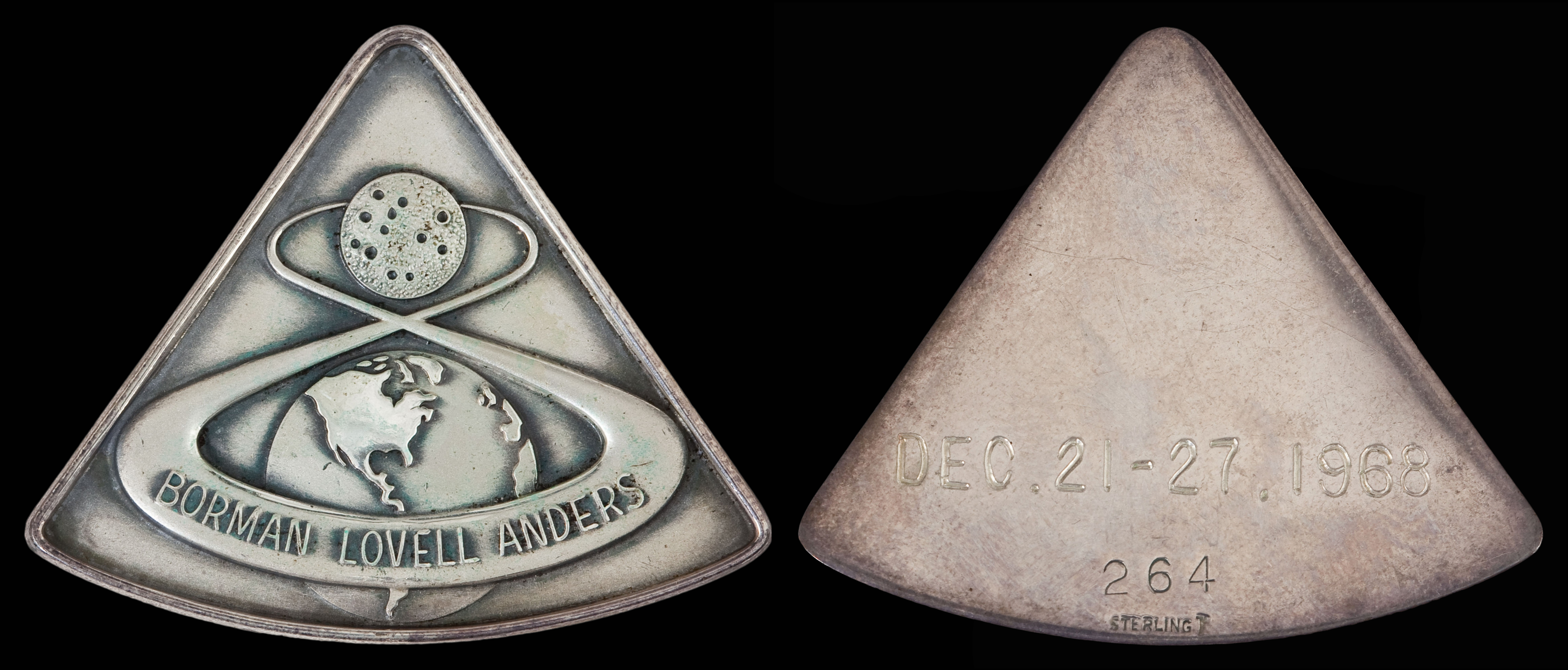
Apollo 8 space-flown silver Robbins medallion

The triangular shape of the insignia refers to the shape of the Apollo CM. It shows a red figure 8 looping around the Earth and Moon to reflect both the mission number and the circumlunar nature of the mission. On the bottom of the 8 are the names of the three astronauts. The initial design of the insignia was developed by Jim Lovell, who reportedly sketched it while riding in the back seat of a T-38 flight from California to Houston shortly after learning of Apollo 8's re-designation as a lunar-orbital mission.

The crew wanted to name their spacecraft, but NASA did not allow it. The crew would have likely chosen Columbiad, the name of the giant cannon that launches a space vehicle in Jules Verne's 1865 novel From the Earth to the Moon. The Apollo 11 CM was named Columbia in part for that reason.

== Preparations ==
=== Mission schedule ===
On September 20, 1967, NASA adopted a seven-step plan for Apollo missions, with the final step being a Moon landing. Apollo 4 and Apollo 6 were "A" missions, tests of the Saturn V launch vehicle using an uncrewed Block I production model of the command and service module (CSM) in Earth orbit. Apollo 5 was a "B" mission, a test of the LM in Earth orbit. Apollo 7, scheduled for October 1968, would be a "C" mission, a crewed Earth-orbit flight of the CSM. Further missions depended on the readiness of the LM. It had been decided as early as May 1967 that there would be at least four additional missions. Apollo 8 was planned as the "D" mission, a test of the LM in a low Earth orbit in December 1968 by James McDivitt, David Scott, and Russell Schweickart, while Borman's crew would fly the "E" mission, a more rigorous LM test in an elliptical medium Earth orbit as Apollo 9, in early 1969. The "F" Mission would test the CSM and LM in lunar orbit, and the "G" mission would be the finale, the Moon landing.

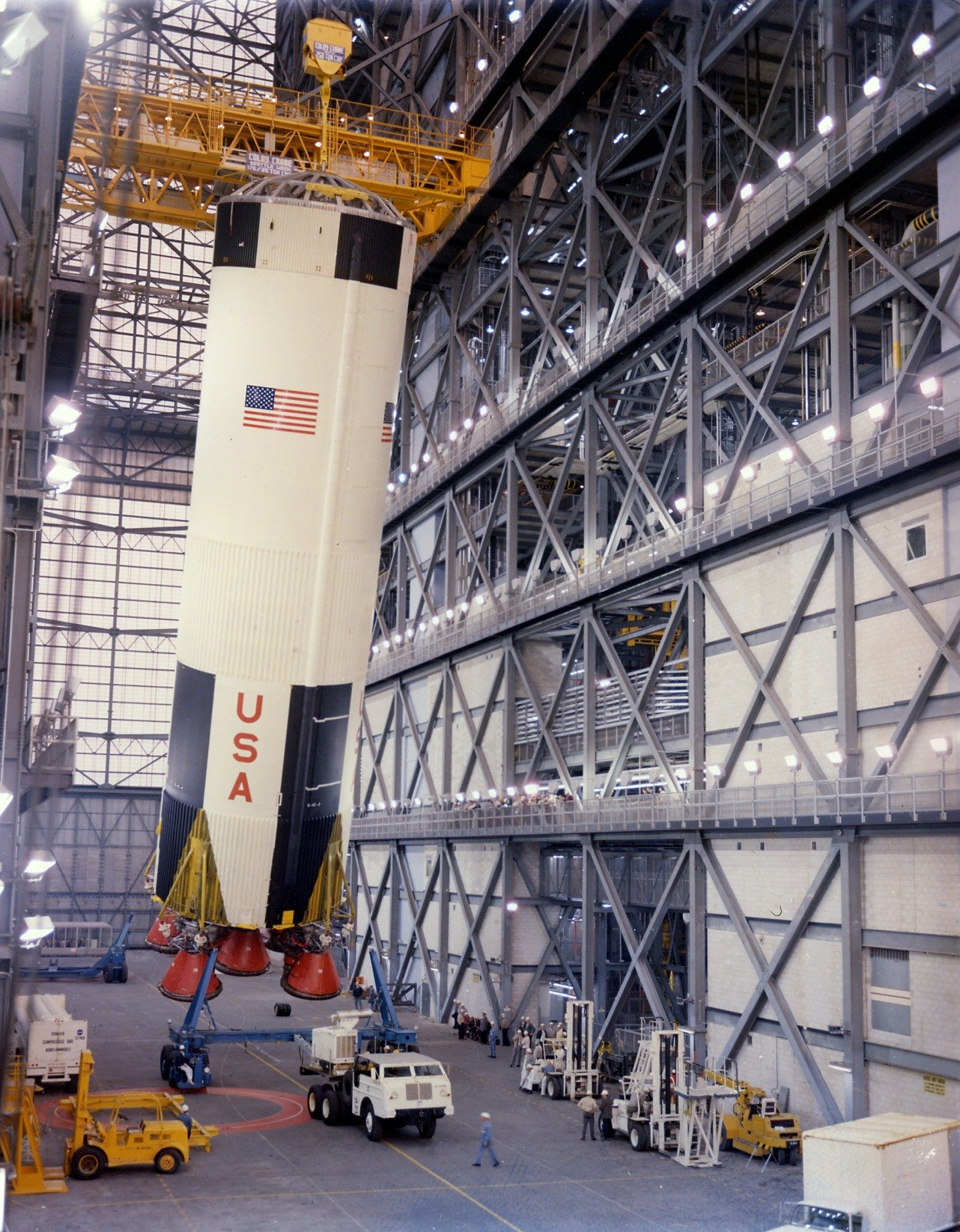
The first stage of AS-503 being erected in the Vehicle Assembly Building (VAB) on February 1, 1968

Production of the LM fell behind schedule, and when Apollo 8's LM-3 arrived at the Kennedy Space Center (KSC) in June 1968, more than a hundred significant defects were discovered, leading Bob Gilruth, the director of the Manned Spacecraft Center (MSC), and others to conclude that there was no prospect of LM-3 being ready to fly in 1968. Indeed, it was possible that delivery would slip to February or March 1969. Following the original seven-step plan would have meant delaying the "D" and subsequent missions, and endangering the program's goal of a lunar landing before the end of 1969. George Low, the Manager of the Apollo Spacecraft Program Office, proposed a solution in August 1968 to keep the program on track despite the LM delay. Since the next CSM (designated as "CSM-103") would be ready three months before LM-3, a CSM-only mission could be flown in December 1968. Instead of repeating the "C" mission flight of Apollo 7, this CSM could be sent all the way to the Moon, with the possibility of entering a lunar orbit and returning to Earth. The new mission would also allow NASA to test lunar landing procedures that would otherwise have had to wait until Apollo 10, the scheduled "F" mission. This also meant that the medium Earth orbit "E" mission could be dispensed with. The net result was that only the "D" mission had to be delayed, and the plan for lunar landing in mid-1969 could remain on timeline.

On August 9, 1968, Low discussed the idea with Gilruth, Flight Director Chris Kraft, and the Director of Flight Crew Operations, Donald Slayton. They then flew to the Marshall Space Flight Center (MSFC) in Huntsville, Alabama, where they met with KSC Director Kurt Debus, Apollo Program Director Samuel C. Phillips, Rocco Petrone, and Wernher von Braun. Jerry Wittenstein, deputy chief of flight mechanics, presented trajectories for the new mission. Kraft considered the proposal feasible from a flight control standpoint; Debus and Petrone agreed that the next Saturn V, AS-503, could be made ready by December 1; and von Braun was confident the pogo oscillation problems that had afflicted Apollo 6 had been fixed. Almost every senior manager at NASA agreed with this new mission, citing confidence in both the hardware and the personnel, along with the potential for a circumlunar flight providing a significant morale boost. The only person who needed some convincing was James E. Webb, the NASA administrator. Backed by the full support of his agency, Webb authorized the mission. Apollo 8 was officially changed from a "D" mission to a "C-Prime" lunar-orbit mission.

With the change in mission for Apollo 8, Slayton asked McDivitt if he still wanted to fly it. McDivitt turned it down; his crew had spent a great deal of time preparing to test the LM, and that was what he still wanted to do. Slayton then decided to swap the prime and backup crews of the D and E missions. This swap also meant a swap of spacecraft, requiring Borman's crew to use CSM-103, while McDivitt's crew would use CSM-104, since CM-104 could not be made ready by December. David Scott was not happy about giving up CM-103, the testing of which he had closely supervised, for CM-104, although the two were almost identical, and Anders was less than enthusiastic about being an LMP on a flight with no LM. Instead, Apollo 8 would carry the LM test article, a boilerplate model that would simulate the correct weight and balance of LM-3.

Added pressure on the Apollo program to make its 1969 landing goal was provided by the Soviet Union's Zond 5 mission, which flew some living creatures, including Russian tortoises, in a cislunar loop around the Moon and returned them to Earth on September 21. There was speculation within NASA and the press that they might be preparing to launch cosmonauts on a similar circumlunar mission before the end of 1968. Compounding these concerns, American reconnaissance satellites observed a mockup N1 being rolled to the pad at Baikonur on November 25, 1967.

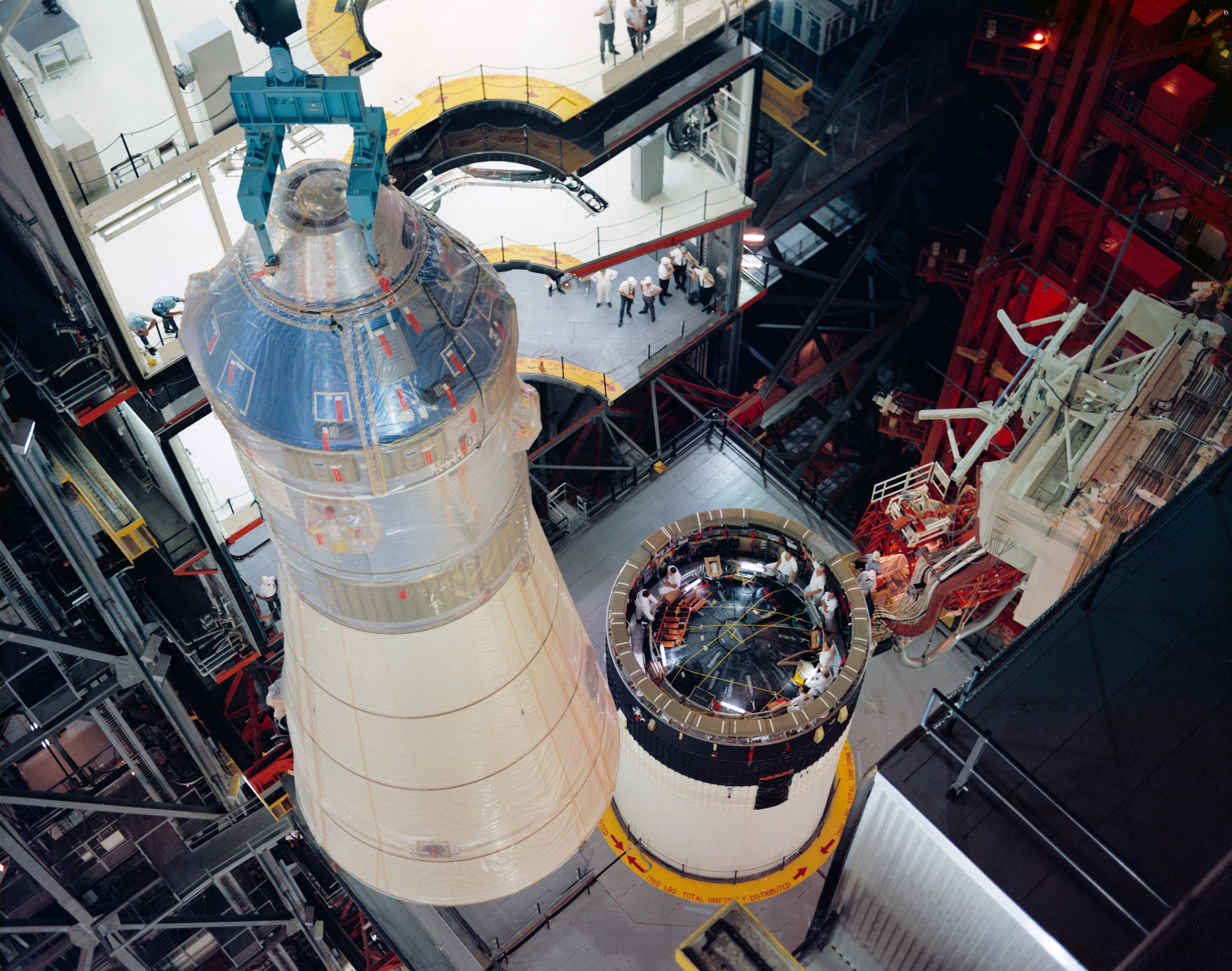
Erection and mating of spacecraft 103 to Launch Vehicle AS-503 in the VAB for the Apollo 8 mission

The Apollo 8 crew, now living in the crew quarters at Kennedy Space Center, received a visit from Charles Lindbergh and his wife, Anne Morrow Lindbergh, the night before the launch. They talked about how, before his 1927 flight, Lindbergh had used a piece of string to measure the distance from New York City to Paris on a globe and from that calculated the fuel needed for the flight. The total he had carried was a tenth of the amount that the Saturn V would burn every second. The next day, the Lindberghs watched the launch of Apollo 8 from a nearby dune.

=== Saturn V redesign ===
The Saturn V rocket used by Apollo 8 was designated AS-503, or the "03rd" model of the Saturn V ("5") rocket to be used in the Apollo-Saturn ("AS") program. When it was erected in the Vehicle Assembly Building on December 20, 1967, it was thought that the rocket would be used for an uncrewed Earth-orbit test flight carrying a boilerplate command and service module. Apollo 6 had suffered several major problems during its April 1968 flight, including severe pogo oscillation during its first stage, two second-stage engine failures, and a third stage that failed to reignite in orbit. Without assurances that these problems had been rectified, NASA administrators could not justify risking a crewed mission until additional uncrewed test flights proved the Saturn V was ready.

Teams from the MSFC went to work on the problems. Of primary concern was the pogo oscillation, which would not only hamper engine performance, but could exert significant g-forces on a crew. A task force of contractors, NASA agency representatives, and MSFC researchers concluded that the engines vibrated at a frequency similar to the frequency at which the spacecraft itself vibrated, causing a resonance effect that induced oscillations in the rocket. A system that used helium gas to absorb some of these vibrations was installed.

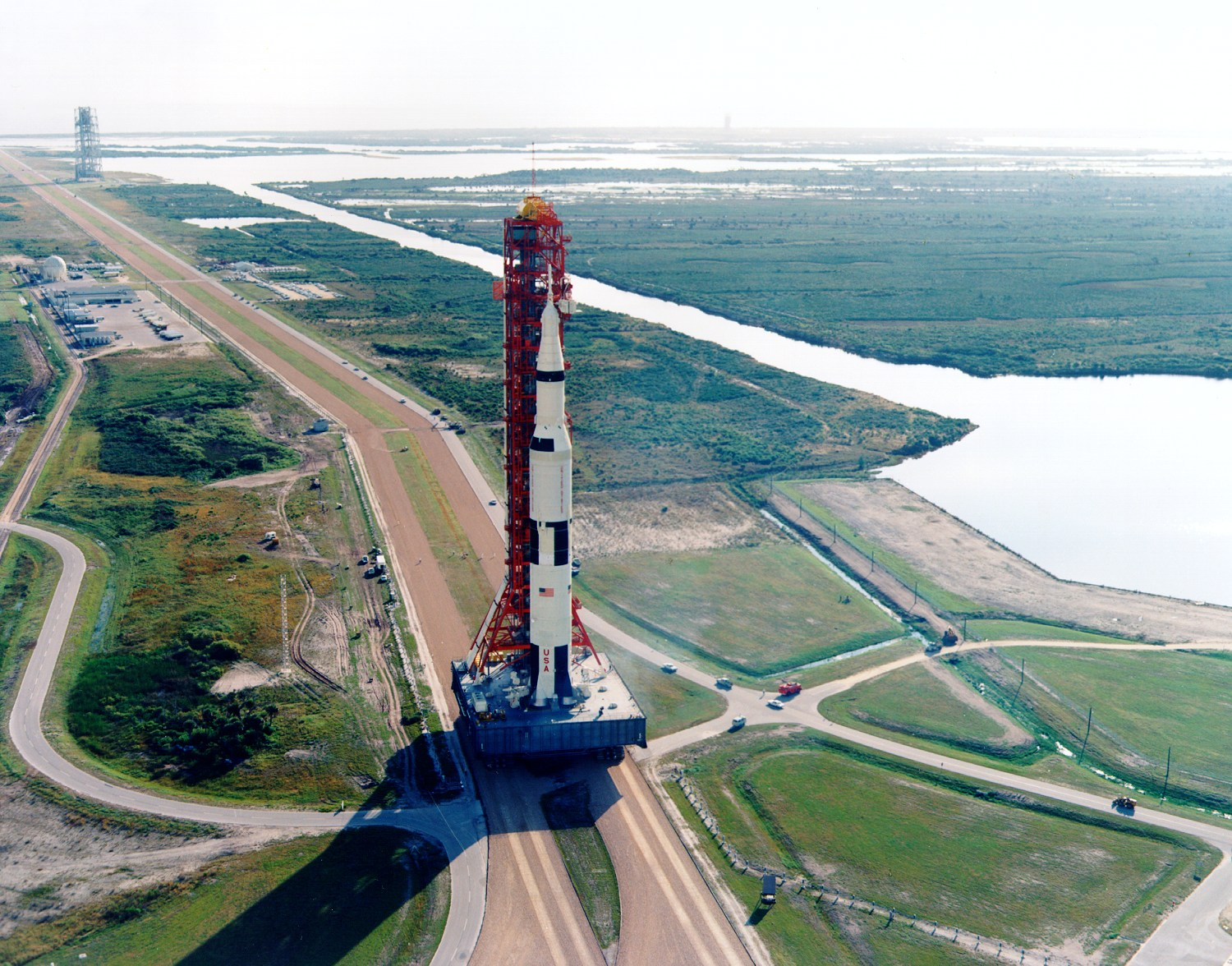
Apollo 8 atop Saturn V being rolled out to Pad 39A atop the crawler-transporter

Of equal importance was the failure of three engines during flight. Researchers quickly determined that a leaking hydrogen fuel line ruptured when exposed to vacuum, causing a loss of fuel pressure in engine two. When an automatic shutoff attempted to close the liquid hydrogen valve and shut down engine two, it had accidentally shut down engine three's liquid oxygen due to a miswired connection. As a result, engine three failed within one second of engine two's shutdown. Further investigation revealed the same problem for the third-stage engine—a faulty igniter line. The team modified the igniter lines and fuel conduits, hoping to avoid similar problems on future launches.

The teams tested their solutions in August 1968 at the MSFC. A Saturn stage IC was equipped with shock-absorbing devices to demonstrate the team's solution to the problem of pogo oscillation, while a Saturn Stage II was retrofitted with modified fuel lines to demonstrate their resistance to leaks and ruptures in vacuum conditions. Once NASA administrators were convinced that the problems had been solved, they gave their approval for a crewed mission using AS-503.

The Apollo 8 spacecraft was placed on top of the rocket on September 21, and the rocket made the slow 3-mile (4.8 km) journey to the launch pad atop one of NASA's two massive crawler-transporters on October 9. Testing continued all through December until the day before launch, including various levels of readiness testing from December 5 through 11. Final testing of modifications to address the problems of pogo oscillation, ruptured fuel lines, and bad igniter lines took place on December 18, three days before the scheduled launch.

== Mission ==
=== Parameter summary ===
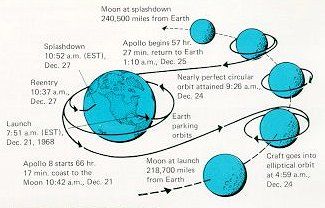
Mission profile

As the first crewed spacecraft to orbit more than one celestial body, Apollo 8's profile had two different sets of orbital parameters, separated by a translunar injection maneuver. Apollo lunar missions would begin with a nominal 100-nautical-mile (185.2 km) circular Earth parking orbit. Apollo 8 was launched into an initial orbit with an apogee of 99.99 nautical miles (185.18 km) and a perigee of 99.57 nautical miles (184.40 km), with an inclination of 32.51° to the Equator, and an orbital period of 88.19 minutes. Propellant venting increased the apogee by 6.4 nautical miles (11.9 km) over the 2 hours, 44 minutes, and 30 seconds spent in the parking orbit.

This was followed by a trans-lunar injection (TLI) burn of the S-IVB third stage for 318 seconds, accelerating the 63,650 lb (28,870 kg) command and service module and 19,900 lb (9,000 kg) LM test article from an orbital velocity of 25,567 feet per second (7,793 m/s) to the injection velocity of 35,505 ft/s (10,822 m/s) which set a record for the highest speed, relative to Earth, that humans had ever traveled. This speed was slightly less than the Earth's escape velocity of 36,747 feet per second (11,200 m/s), but put Apollo 8 into an elongated elliptical Earth orbit, close enough to the Moon to be captured by the Moon's gravity.

The standard lunar orbit for Apollo missions was planned as a nominal 60-nautical-mile (110 km) circular orbit above the Moon's surface. Initial lunar orbit insertion was an ellipse with a perilune of 60.0 nautical miles (111.1 km) and an apolune of 168.5 nautical miles (312.1 km), at an inclination of 12° from the lunar equator. This was then circularized at 60.7 by 59.7 nautical miles (112.4 by 110.6 km), with an orbital period of 128.7 minutes. The effect of lunar mass concentrations ("mascons") on the orbit was found to be greater than initially predicted; over the course of the ten lunar orbits lasting twenty hours, the orbital distance was perturbed to 63.6 by 58.6 nautical miles (117.8 by 108.5 km).

Apollo 8 achieved a maximum distance from Earth of 203,752 nautical miles (234,474 statute miles; 377,349 kilometers).

=== Launch and trans-lunar injection ===
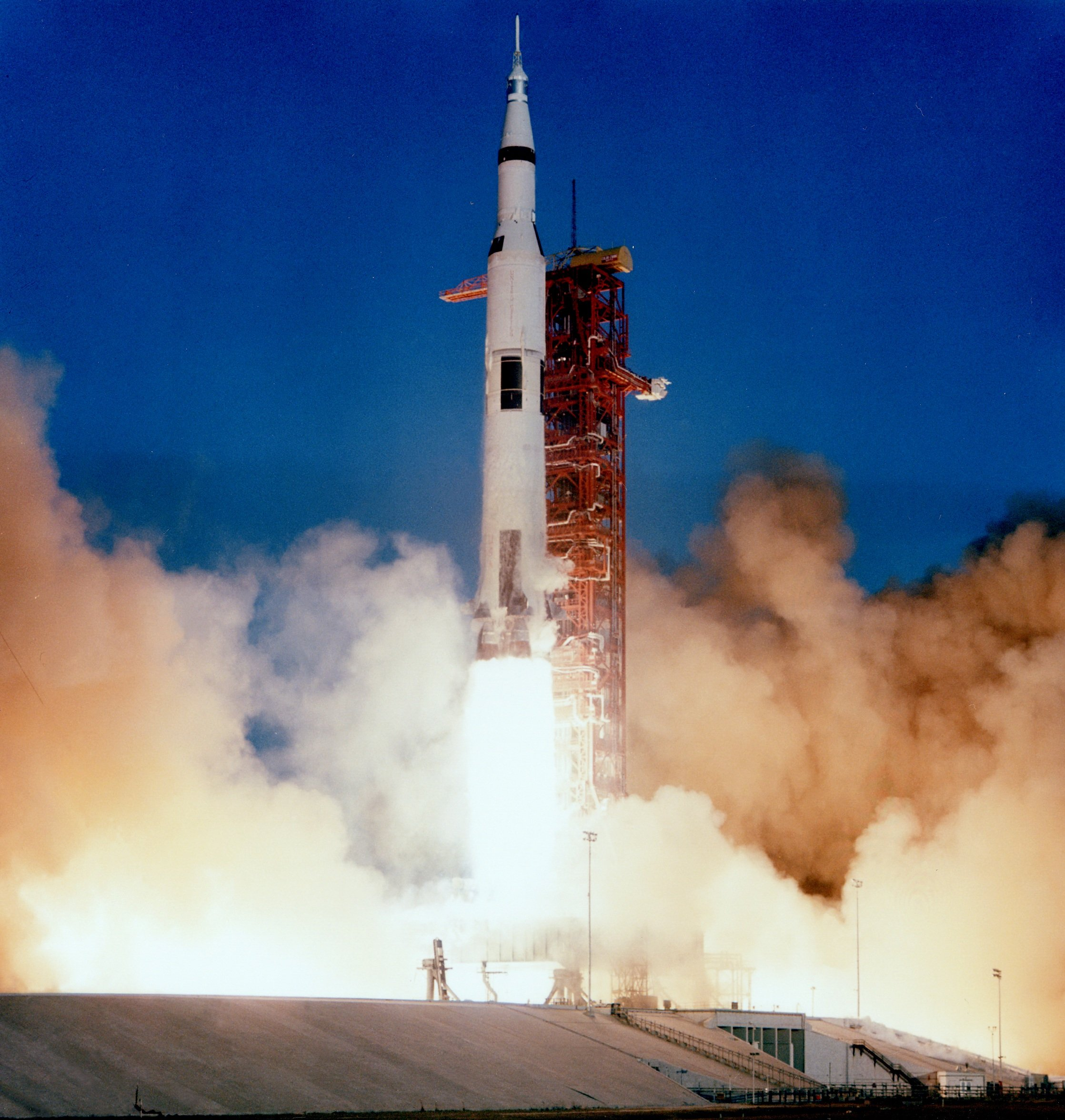
Apollo 8 launch

Apollo 8 was launched at 12:51:00 UTC (7:51 am EST) on December 21, 1968, using the Saturn V's three stages to achieve Earth orbit. The S-IC first stage landed in the Atlantic Ocean at 30°12′N 74°7′W, and the S-II second stage landed at 31°50′N 37°17′W. The S-IVB third stage injected the craft into Earth orbit and remained attached to perform the TLI burn that would put the spacecraft on a trajectory to the Moon.

Once the vehicle reached Earth orbit, both the crew and Houston flight controllers spent the next 2 hours and 38 minutes checking that the spacecraft was in proper working order and ready for TLI. The proper operation of the S-IVB third stage of the rocket was crucial, and in the last uncrewed test, it had failed to reignite for this burn. Collins was the first CAPCOM on duty, and at 2 hours, 27 minutes and 22 seconds after launch he radioed, "Apollo 8. You are Go for TLI." This communication meant that Mission Control had given official permission for Apollo 8 to go to the Moon. The S-IVB engine ignited on time and performed the TLI burn perfectly. Over the next five minutes, the spacecraft's speed increased from 7,600 to 10,800 meters per second (25,000 to 35,000 ft/s).

After the S-IVB had placed the mission on course for the Moon, the command and service module (CSM), the remaining Apollo 8 spacecraft, separated from it. The crew then rotated the spacecraft to take photographs of the spent stage and then practiced flying in formation with it. As the crew rotated the spacecraft, they had their first views of the Earth as they moved away from it—this marked the first time humans had viewed the whole Earth at once. Borman became worried that the S-IVB was staying too close to the CSM and suggested to Mission Control that the crew perform a separation maneuver. Mission Control first suggested pointing the spacecraft towards Earth and using the small reaction control system (RCS) thrusters on the service module (SM) to add 1.1 ft/s (0.34 m/s) to their velocity away from the Earth, but Borman did not want to lose sight of the S-IVB. After discussion, the crew and Mission Control decided to burn in the Earth direction to increase speed, but at 7.7 ft/s (2.3 m/s) instead. The time needed to prepare and perform the additional burn put the crew an hour behind their onboard tasks.

Apollo 8 S-IVB rocket stage shortly after separation. The LM test article, a circular boilerplate model of the LM, is visible with four triangular legs connecting it to the stage.

Five hours after launch, Mission Control sent a command to the S-IVB to vent its remaining fuel, changing its trajectory. The S-IVB, with the test article attached, posed no further hazard to Apollo 8, passing the orbit of the Moon and going into a 0.99-by-0.92-astronomical-unit (148 by 138 Gm) solar orbit with an inclination of 23.47° from the Earth's equatorial plane, and an orbital period of 340.80 days. It became a derelict object, and will continue to orbit the Sun for many years, if not retrieved.

The Apollo 8 crew were the first humans to pass through the Van Allen radiation belts, which extend up to 15,000 miles (24,000 km) from Earth. Scientists predicted that passing through the belts quickly at the spacecraft's high speed would cause a radiation dosage of no more than a chest X-ray, or 1 milligray (mGy; during a year, the average human receives a dose of 2 to 3 mGy from background radiation). To record the actual radiation dosages, each crew member wore a Personal Radiation Dosimeter that transmitted data to Earth, as well as three passive film dosimeters that showed the cumulative radiation experienced by the crew. By the end of the mission, the crew members experienced an average radiation dose of 1.6 mGy.

=== Lunar trajectory ===
Lovell's main job as Command Module Pilot was as navigator. Although Mission Control normally performed all the navigation calculations, it was necessary to have a crew member adept at navigation so that the crew could return to Earth in case communication with Mission Control was lost. Lovell navigated by star sightings using a sextant built into the spacecraft, measuring the angle between a star and the Earth's (or the Moon's) horizon. This task was made difficult by a large cloud of debris around the spacecraft, which made it hard to distinguish the stars.

By seven hours into the mission, the crew was about 1 hour and 40 minutes behind flight plan because of the problems in moving away from the S-IVB and Lovell's obscured star sightings. The crew placed the spacecraft into Passive Thermal Control (PTC), also called "barbecue roll", in which the spacecraft rotated about once per hour around its long axis to ensure even heat distribution across the surface of the spacecraft. In direct sunlight, parts of the spacecraft's outer surface could be heated to over 200 °C (392 °F), while the parts in shadow would be −100 °C (−148 °F). These temperatures could cause the heat shield to crack and propellant lines to burst. Because it was impossible to get a perfect roll, the spacecraft swept out a cone as it rotated. The crew had to make minor adjustments every half hour as the cone pattern got larger and larger.

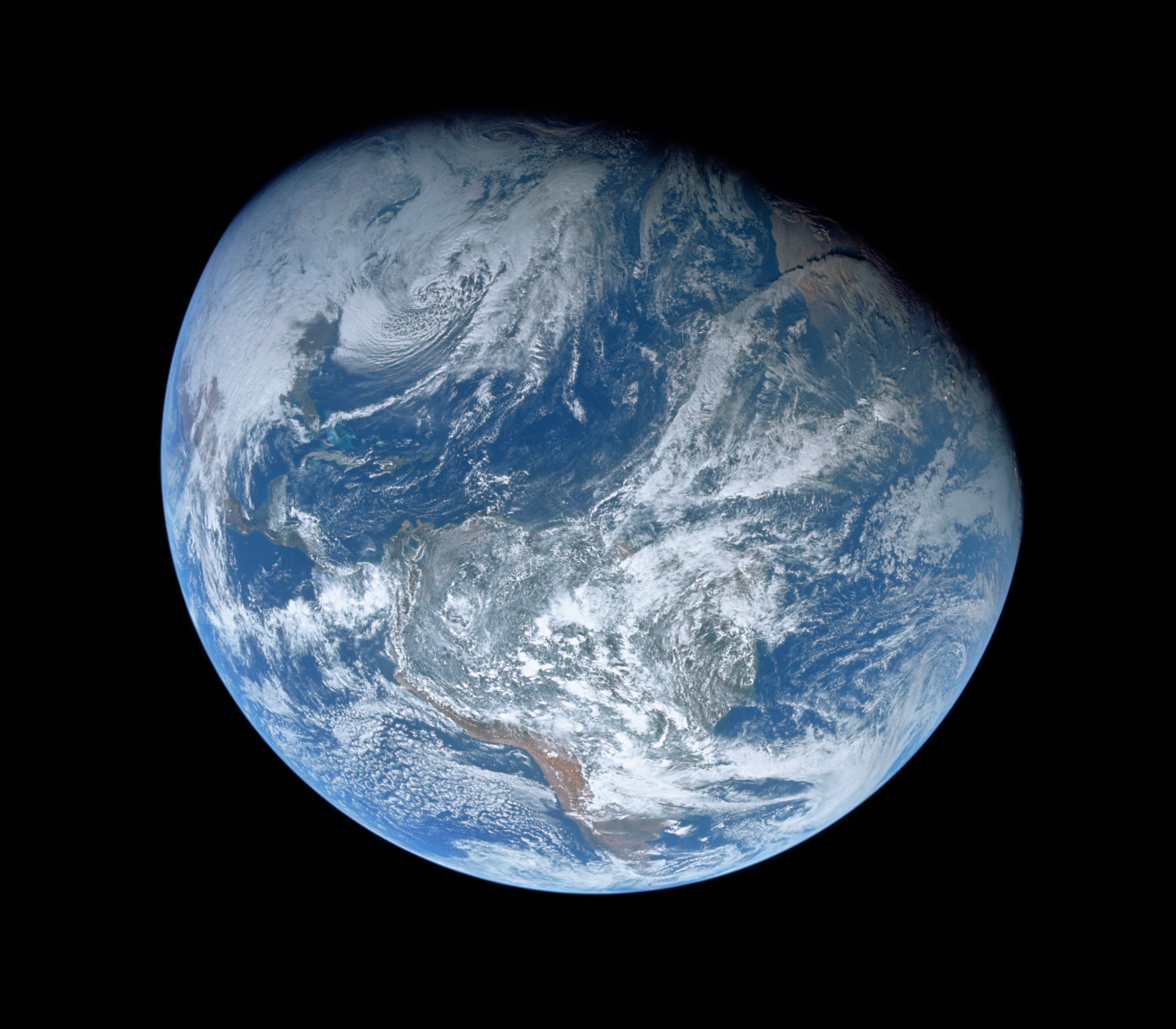
The first image taken by humans of the whole Earth, probably photographed by William Anders. (time tag: 003:42:55) South America is visible in the lower half.

The first mid-course correction came eleven hours into the flight. The crew had been awake for more than 16 hours. Before launch, NASA had decided at least one crew member should be awake at all times to deal with problems that might arise. Borman started the first sleep shift but found sleeping difficult because of the constant radio chatter and mechanical noises. Testing on the ground had shown that the service propulsion system (SPS) engine had a small chance of exploding when burned for long periods unless its combustion chamber was "coated" first by burning the engine for a short period. This first correction burn was only 2.4 seconds and added about 20.4 ft/s (6.2 m/s) velocity prograde (in the direction of travel). This change was less than the planned 24.8 ft/s (7.6 m/s), because of a bubble of helium in the oxidizer lines, which caused unexpectedly low propellant pressure. The crew had to use the small RCS thrusters to make up the shortfall. Two later planned mid-course corrections were canceled because the Apollo 8 trajectory was found to be perfect.

About an hour after starting his sleep shift, Borman obtained permission from ground control to take a Seconal sleeping pill. The pill had little effect. Borman eventually fell asleep, and then awoke feeling ill. He vomited twice and had a bout of diarrhea; this left the spacecraft full of small globules of vomit and feces, which the crew cleaned up as well as they could. Borman initially did not want everyone to know about his medical problems, but Lovell and Anders wanted to inform Mission Control. The crew decided to use the Data Storage Equipment (DSE), which could tape voice recordings and telemetry and dump them to Mission Control at high speed. After recording a description of Borman's illness they asked Mission Control to check the recording, stating that they "would like an evaluation of the voice comments".

The Apollo 8 crew and Mission Control medical personnel held a conference using an unoccupied second-floor control room (there were two identical control rooms in Houston, on the second and third floors, only one of which was used during a mission). The conference participants concluded that there was little to worry about and that Borman's illness was either a 24-hour flu, as Borman thought, or a reaction to the sleeping pill. Researchers now believe that he was suffering from space adaptation syndrome, which affects about a third of astronauts during their first day in space as their vestibular system adapts to weightlessness. Space adaptation syndrome had not occurred on previous spacecraft (Mercury and Gemini), because those astronauts could not move freely in the small cabins of those spacecraft. The increased cabin space in the Apollo command module afforded astronauts greater freedom of movement, contributing to symptoms of space sickness for Borman and, later, astronaut Rusty Schweickart during Apollo 9.

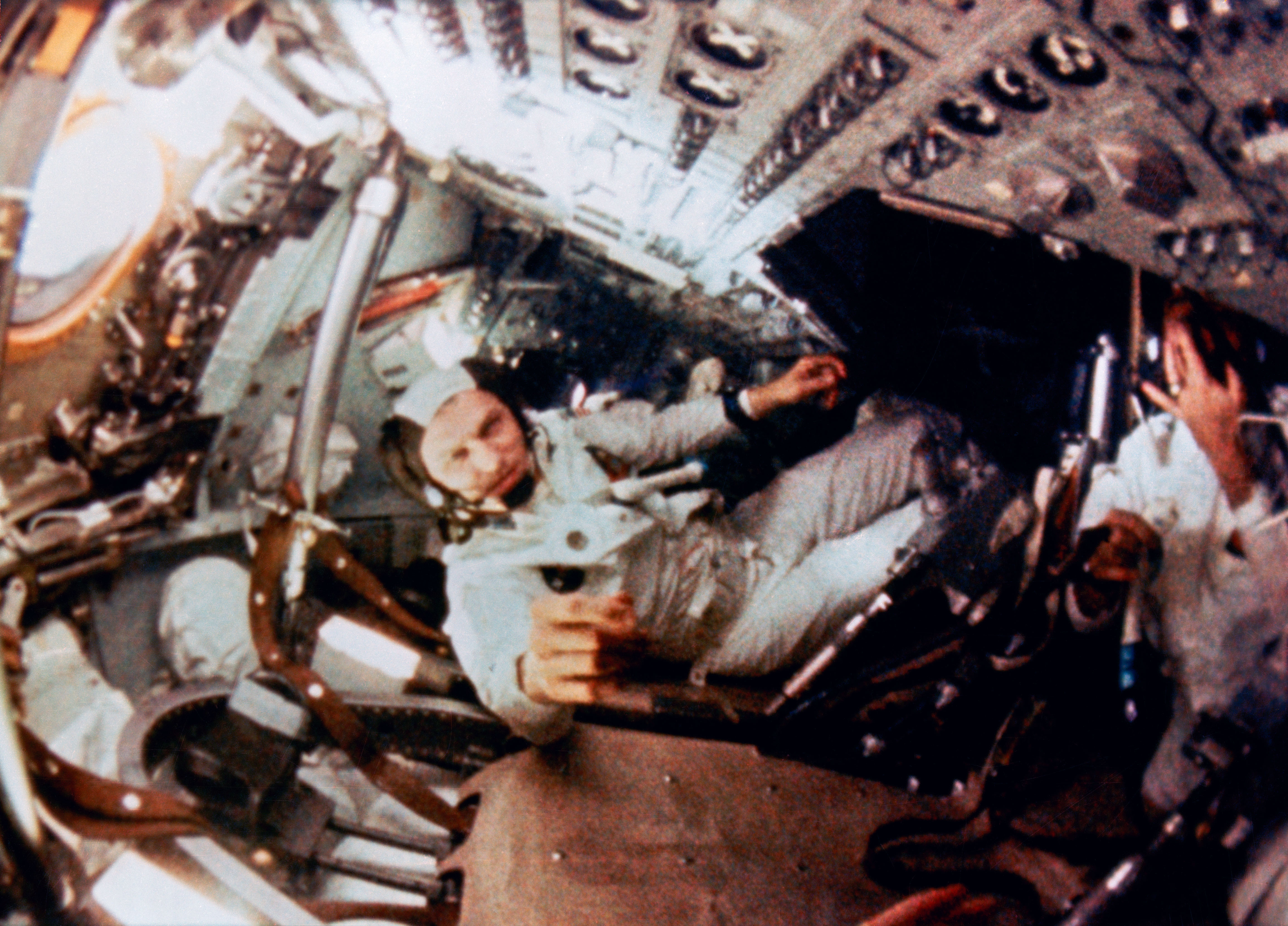
Still from film of the crew taken while they were in orbit around the Moon. Frank Borman is in the center.

The cruise phase was a relatively uneventful part of the flight, except for the crew's checking that the spacecraft was in working order and that they were on course. During this time, NASA scheduled a television broadcast at 31 hours after launch. The Apollo 8 crew used a 2-kilogram (4.4 lb) camera that transmitted in black-and-white only, using a Vidicon tube. The camera had two lenses, a very wide-angle (160°) lens, and a telephoto (9°) lens.

During this first broadcast, the crew gave a tour of the spacecraft and attempted to show how the Earth appeared from space. However, difficulties aiming the narrow-angle lens without the aid of a monitor to show what it was looking at made showing the Earth impossible. Additionally, without proper filters, the Earth image became saturated by any bright source. In the end, all the crew could show the people watching back on Earth was a bright blob. After broadcasting for 17 minutes, the rotation of the spacecraft took the high-gain antenna out of view of the receiving stations on Earth and they ended the transmission with Lovell wishing his mother a happy birthday.

By this time, the crew had completely abandoned the planned sleep shifts. Lovell went to sleep 32 1/2 hours into the flight – three-and-a-half hours before he had planned to. A short while later, Anders also went to sleep after taking a sleeping pill. The crew was unable to see the Moon for much of the outward cruise. Two factors made the Moon almost impossible to see from inside the spacecraft: three of the five windows fogging up due to out-gassed oils from the silicone sealant, and the attitude required for passive thermal control. It was not until the crew had gone behind the Moon that they would be able to see it for the first time.

Apollo 8 made a second television broadcast at 55 hours into the flight. This time, the crew rigged up filters meant for the still cameras so they could acquire images of the Earth through the telephoto lens. Although difficult to aim, as they had to maneuver the entire spacecraft, the crew was able to transmit back to Earth the first television pictures of the Earth. The crew spent the transmission describing the Earth, what was visible, and the colors they could see. The transmission lasted 23 minutes.

=== Lunar sphere of influence ===
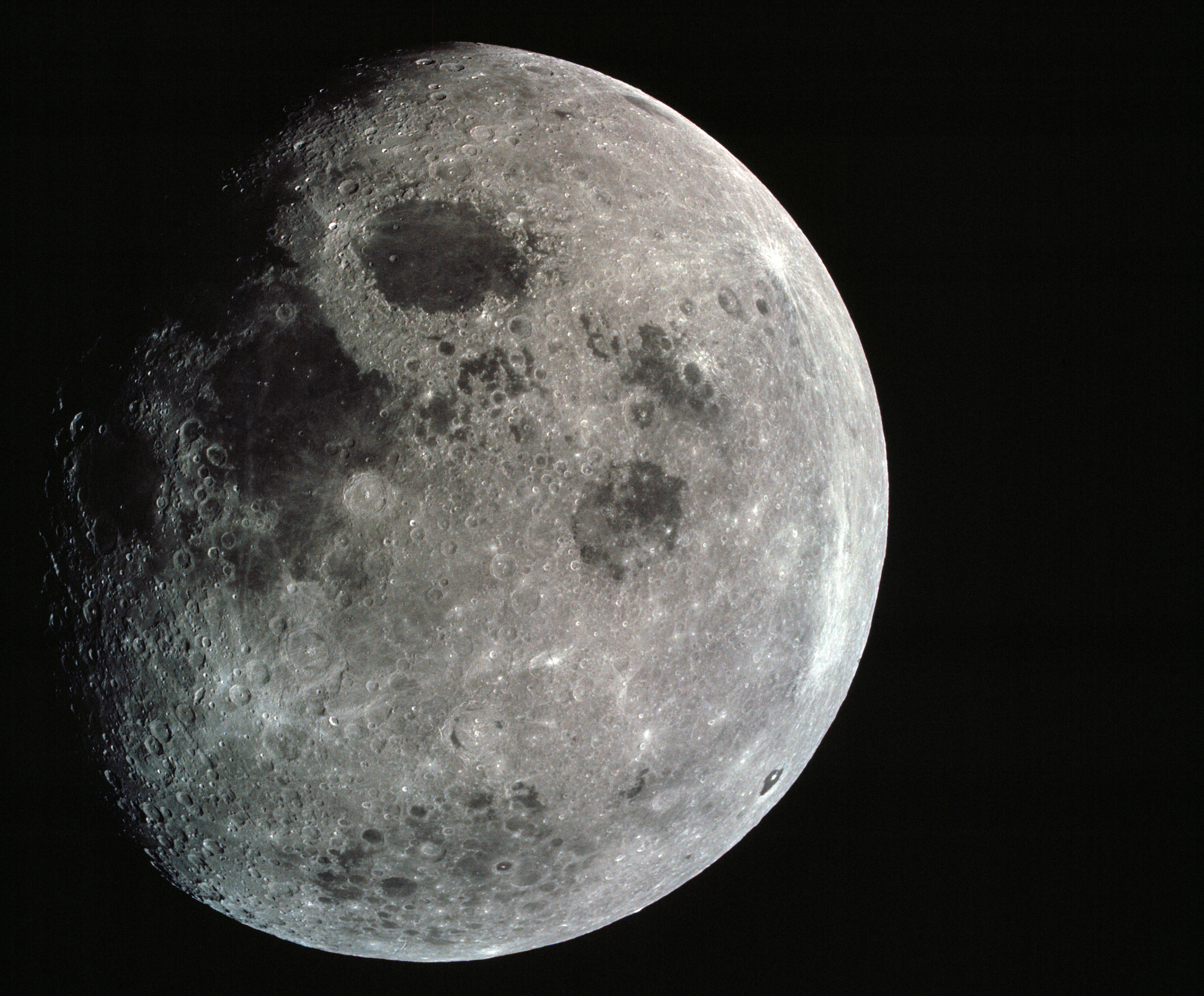
This photograph of the Moon was taken from Apollo 8 at a point above 70 degrees east longitude.

At about 55 hours and 40 minutes into the flight, and 13 hours before entering lunar orbit, the crew of Apollo 8 became the first humans to enter the gravitational sphere of influence of another celestial body. In other words, the effect of the Moon's gravitational force on Apollo 8 became stronger than that of the Earth. At the time it happened, Apollo 8 was 38,759 miles (62,377 km) from the Moon and had a speed of 3,990 ft/s (1,220 m/s) relative to the Moon. This historic moment was of little interest to the crew, since they were still calculating their trajectory with respect to the launch pad at Kennedy Space Center. They would continue to do so until they performed their last mid-course correction, switching to a reference frame based on ideal orientation for the second engine burn they would make in lunar orbit.

The last major event before Lunar Orbit Insertion (LOI) was a second mid-course correction. It was in retrograde (against the direction of travel) and slowed the spacecraft down by 2.0 ft/s (0.61 m/s), effectively reducing the closest distance at which the spacecraft would pass the Moon. At exactly 61 hours after launch, about 24,200 miles (38,900 km) from the Moon, the crew burned the RCS for 11 seconds. They would now pass 71.7 miles (115.4 km) from the lunar surface.

At 64 hours into the flight, the crew began to prepare for Lunar Orbit Insertion 1 (LOI-1). This maneuver had to be performed perfectly, and due to orbital mechanics had to be on the far side of the Moon, out of contact with the Earth. After Mission Control was polled for a "go/no go" decision, the crew was told at 68 hours that they were Go and "riding the best bird we can find". Lovell replied, "We'll see you on the other side", and for the first time in history, humans travelled behind the Moon and out of radio contact with the Earth. Frances "Poppy" Northcutt, who was the first woman in NASA's mission control and helped calculate the return to Earth trajectory for this mission, recounts what it was like when Apollo 8 went behind the Moon for the first time in an interview: "That was a very nerve-racking period on the team I was on, and I think it was a very nerve-racking period in general because of this thing with losing signal. You've got this big mystery going on there on the backside of the Moon. You do not know what's happening and there's not a darn thing anybody here can do about it until we hear from them."

With ten minutes remaining before LOI-1, the crew began one last check of the spacecraft systems and made sure that every switch was in its correct position. At that time, they finally got their first glimpses of the Moon. They had been flying over the unlit side, and it was Lovell who saw the first shafts of sunlight obliquely illuminating the lunar surface. The LOI burn was only two minutes away, so the crew had little time to appreciate the view.

=== Lunar orbit ===
The SPS was ignited at 69 hours, 8 minutes, and 16 seconds after launch and burned for 4 minutes and 7 seconds, placing the Apollo 8 spacecraft in orbit around the Moon. The crew described the burn as being the longest four minutes of their lives. If the burn had not lasted exactly the correct amount of time, the spacecraft could have ended up in a highly elliptical lunar orbit or even been flung off into space. If it had lasted too long, they could have struck the Moon. After making sure the spacecraft was working, they finally had a chance to look at the Moon, which they would orbit for the next 20 hours.

On Earth, Mission Control continued to wait. If the crew had not burned the engine, or the burn had not lasted the planned length of time, the crew would have appeared early from behind the Moon. Exactly at the calculated moment the signal was received from the spacecraft, indicating it was in a 193.3-by-69.5-mile (311.1 by 111.8 km) orbit around the Moon.

After reporting on the status of the spacecraft, Lovell gave the first description of what the lunar surface looked like:

The Moon is essentially grey, no color; looks like plaster of Paris or sort of a grayish beach sand. We can see quite a bit of detail. The Sea of Fertility doesn't stand out as well here as it does back on Earth. There's not as much contrast between that and the surrounding craters. The craters are all rounded off. There's quite a few of them, some of them are newer. Many of them look like—especially the round ones—look like hit by meteorites or projectiles of some sort. Langrenus is quite a huge crater; it's got a central cone to it. The walls of the crater are terraced, about six or seven different terraces on the way down.

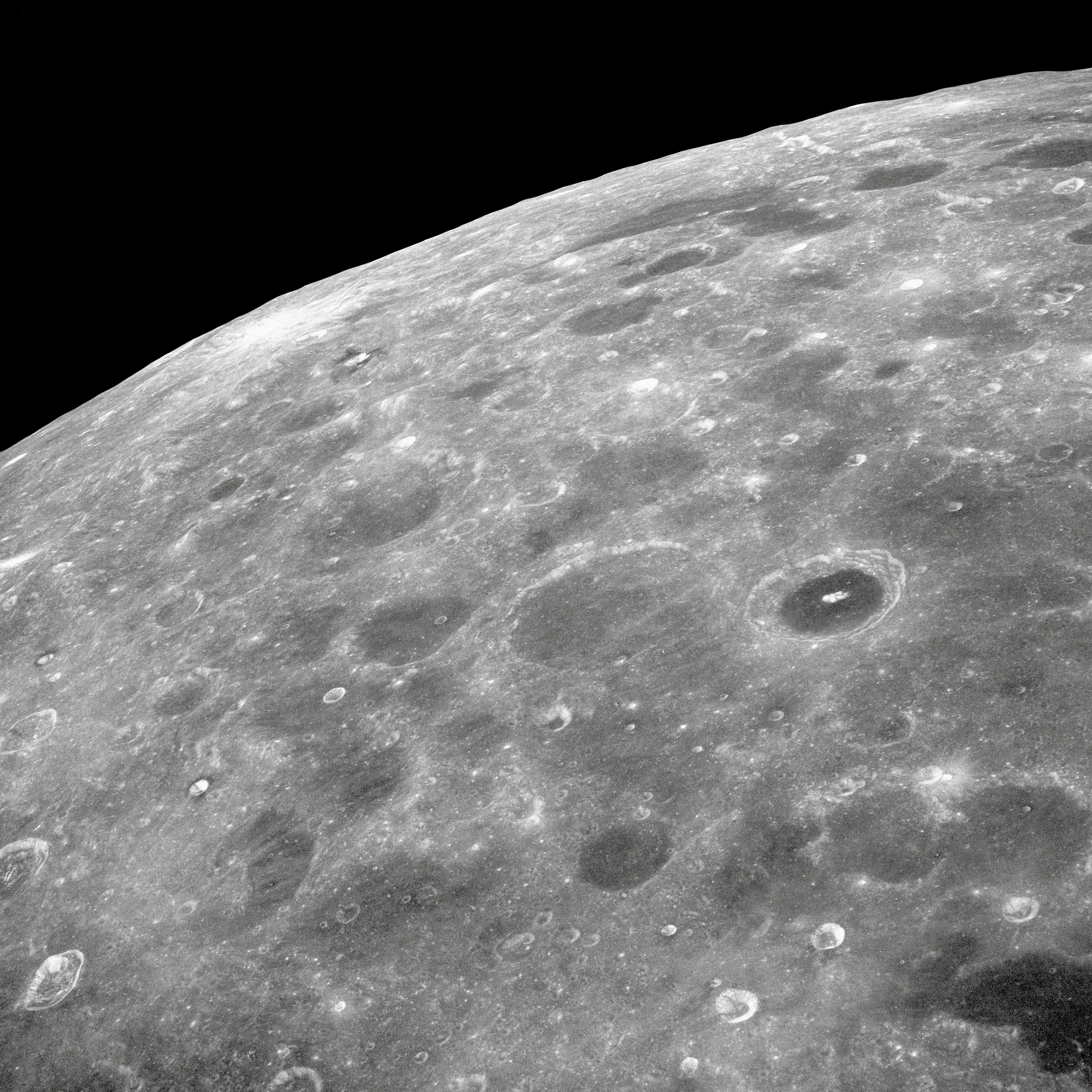
A portion of the lunar far side as seen from Apollo 8

Lovell continued to describe the terrain they were passing over. One of the crew's major tasks was reconnaissance of planned future landing sites on the Moon, especially one in Mare Tranquillitatis that was planned as the Apollo 11 landing site (and indeed was the site where later, July 1969, the Apollo 11 would land). The launch time of Apollo 8 had been chosen to give the best lighting conditions for examining the site. A film camera had been set up in one of the spacecraft windows to record one frame per second of the Moon below. Bill Anders spent much of the next 20 hours taking as many photographs as possible of targets of interest. By the end of the mission, the crew had taken over eight hundred 70 mm still photographs and 700 feet (210 m) of 16 mm movie film.

Throughout the hour that the spacecraft was in contact with Earth, Borman kept asking how the data for the SPS looked. He wanted to make sure that the engine was working and could be used to return early to the Earth if necessary. He also asked that they receive a "go/no go" decision before they passed behind the Moon on each orbit.

As they reappeared for their second pass in front of the Moon, the crew set up equipment to broadcast a view of the lunar surface. Anders described the craters that they were passing over. At the end of this second orbit, they performed an 11-second LOI-2 burn of the SPS to circularize the orbit to 70.0 by 71.3 miles (112.7 by 114.7 km).

Throughout the next two orbits, the crew continued to check the spacecraft and to observe and photograph the Moon. During the third pass, Borman read a small prayer for his church. He had been scheduled to participate in a service at St. Christopher's Episcopal Church near Seabrook, Texas, but due to the Apollo 8 flight, he was unable to attend. A fellow parishioner and engineer at Mission Control, Rod Rose, suggested that Borman read the prayer, which could be recorded and then replayed during the service.

=== Earthrise and Genesis broadcast ===
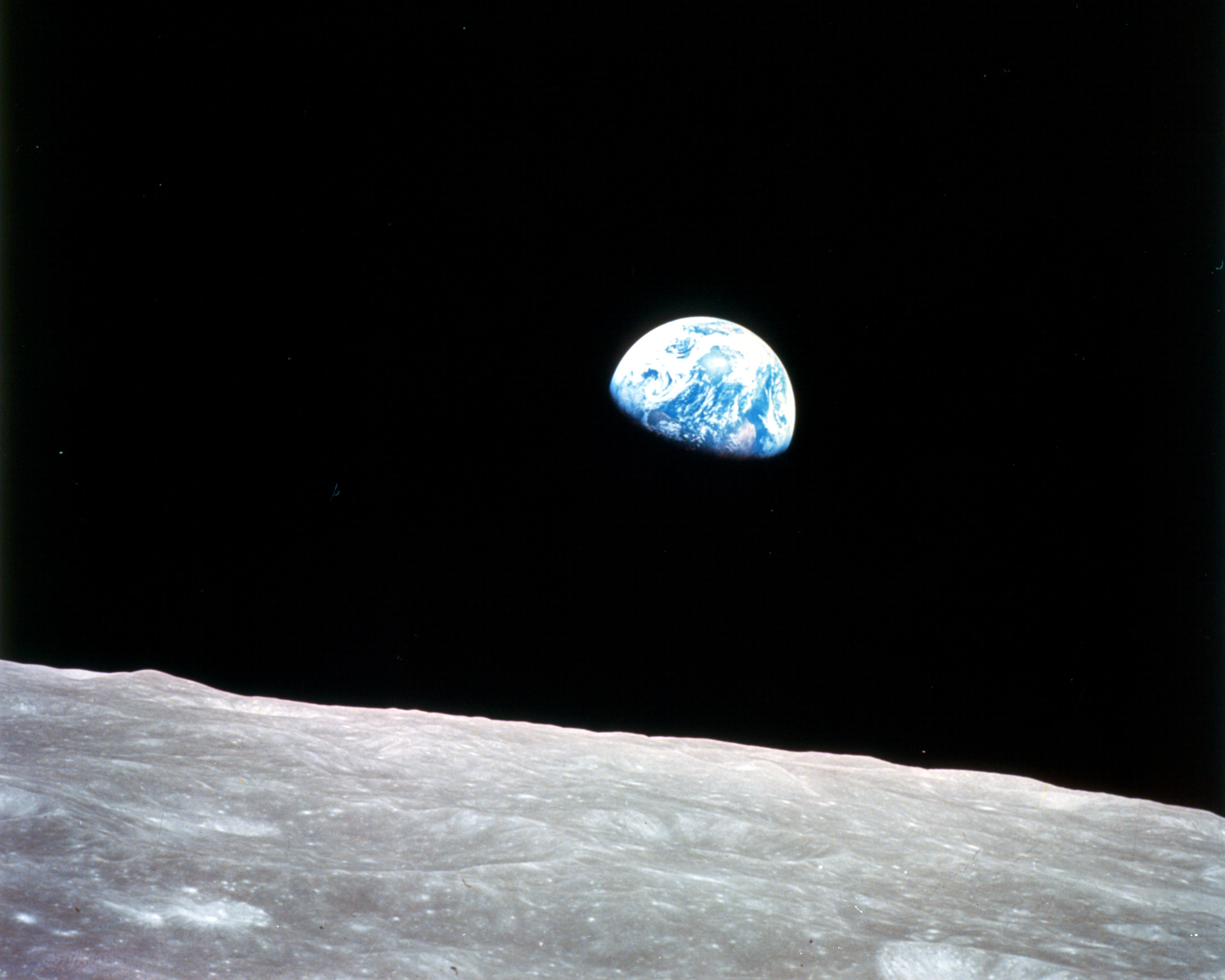
The Earthrise image

Apollo 8's 1968 Christmas Eve broadcast and reading from the Book of Genesis

When the spacecraft came out from behind the Moon for its fourth pass across the front, the crew witnessed an "Earthrise" in person for the first time in human history. NASA's Lunar Orbiter 1 had taken the first picture of an Earthrise from the vicinity of the Moon, on August 23, 1966. Anders saw the Earth emerging from behind the lunar horizon and called in excitement to the others, taking a black-and-white photograph as he did so. Anders asked Lovell for color film and then took Earthrise, a now famous color photo, later picked by Life magazine as one of its hundred photos of the century.

Due to the synchronous rotation of the Moon about the Earth, Earthrise is not generally visible from the lunar surface. This is because, as seen from any one place on the Moon's surface, Earth remains in approximately the same position in the lunar sky, either above or below the horizon. Earthrise is generally visible only while orbiting the Moon, and at selected surface locations near the Moon's limb, where libration carries the Earth slightly above and below the lunar horizon.

Anders continued to take photographs while Lovell assumed control of the spacecraft so that Borman could rest. Despite the difficulty resting in the cramped and noisy spacecraft, Borman was able to sleep for two orbits, awakening periodically to ask questions about their status. Borman awoke fully when he started to hear his fellow crew members make mistakes. They were beginning to not understand questions and had to ask for the answers to be repeated. Borman realized that everyone was extremely tired from not having a good night's sleep in over three days. He ordered Anders and Lovell to get some sleep and that the rest of the flight plan regarding observing the Moon be scrubbed. Anders initially protested, saying that he was fine, but Borman would not be swayed. Anders finally agreed under the condition that Borman would set up the camera to continue to take automatic pictures of the Moon. Borman also remembered that there was a second television broadcast planned, and with so many people expected to be watching, he wanted the crew to be alert. For the next two orbits, Anders and Lovell slept while Borman sat at the helm.

Apollo 8 Genesis reading

As they rounded the Moon for the ninth time, the astronauts began the second television transmission. Borman introduced the crew, followed by each man giving his impression of the lunar surface and what it was like to be orbiting the Moon. Borman described it as being "a vast, lonely, forbidding expanse of nothing". Then, after talking about what they were flying over, Anders said that the crew had a message for all those on Earth. Each man on board read a section from the Biblical creation story from the Book of Genesis. Borman finished the broadcast by wishing a Merry Christmas to everyone on Earth. His message appeared to sum up the feelings that all three crewmen had from their vantage point in lunar orbit. Borman said, "And from the crew of Apollo 8, we close with good night, good luck, a Merry Christmas and God bless all of you—all of you on the good Earth."

The only task left for the crew at this point was to perform the trans-Earth injection (TEI), which was scheduled for 2 1/2 hours after the end of the television transmission. The TEI was the most critical burn of the flight, as any failure of the SPS to ignite would strand the crew in lunar orbit, with little hope of escape. As with the previous burn, the crew had to perform the maneuver above the far side of the Moon, out of contact with Earth. The burn occurred exactly on time. The spacecraft telemetry was reacquired as it re-emerged from behind the Moon at 89 hours, 28 minutes, and 39 seconds, the exact time calculated. When voice contact was regained, Lovell announced, "Please be informed, there is a Santa Claus", to which Ken Mattingly, the current CAPCOM, replied, "That's affirmative, you are the best ones to know." The spacecraft began its journey back to Earth on December 25, Christmas Day.

=== Unplanned manual realignment ===
Later, Lovell used some otherwise idle time to do some navigational sightings, maneuvering the module to view various stars by using the Apollo Guidance Computer keyboard. He accidentally erased some of the computer's memory, which caused the inertial measurement unit (IMU) to contain data indicating that the module was in the same relative orientation it had been in before lift-off; the IMU then fired the thrusters to "correct" the module's attitude.

Once the crew realized why the computer had changed the module's attitude, they realized that they would have to reenter data to tell the computer the module's actual orientation. It took Lovell ten minutes to figure out the right numbers, using the thrusters to get the stars Rigel and Sirius aligned, and another 15 minutes to enter the corrected data into the computer. Sixteen months later, during the Apollo 13 mission, Lovell would have to perform a similar manual realignment under more critical conditions after the module's IMU had to be turned off to conserve energy.

=== Cruise back to Earth and reentry ===
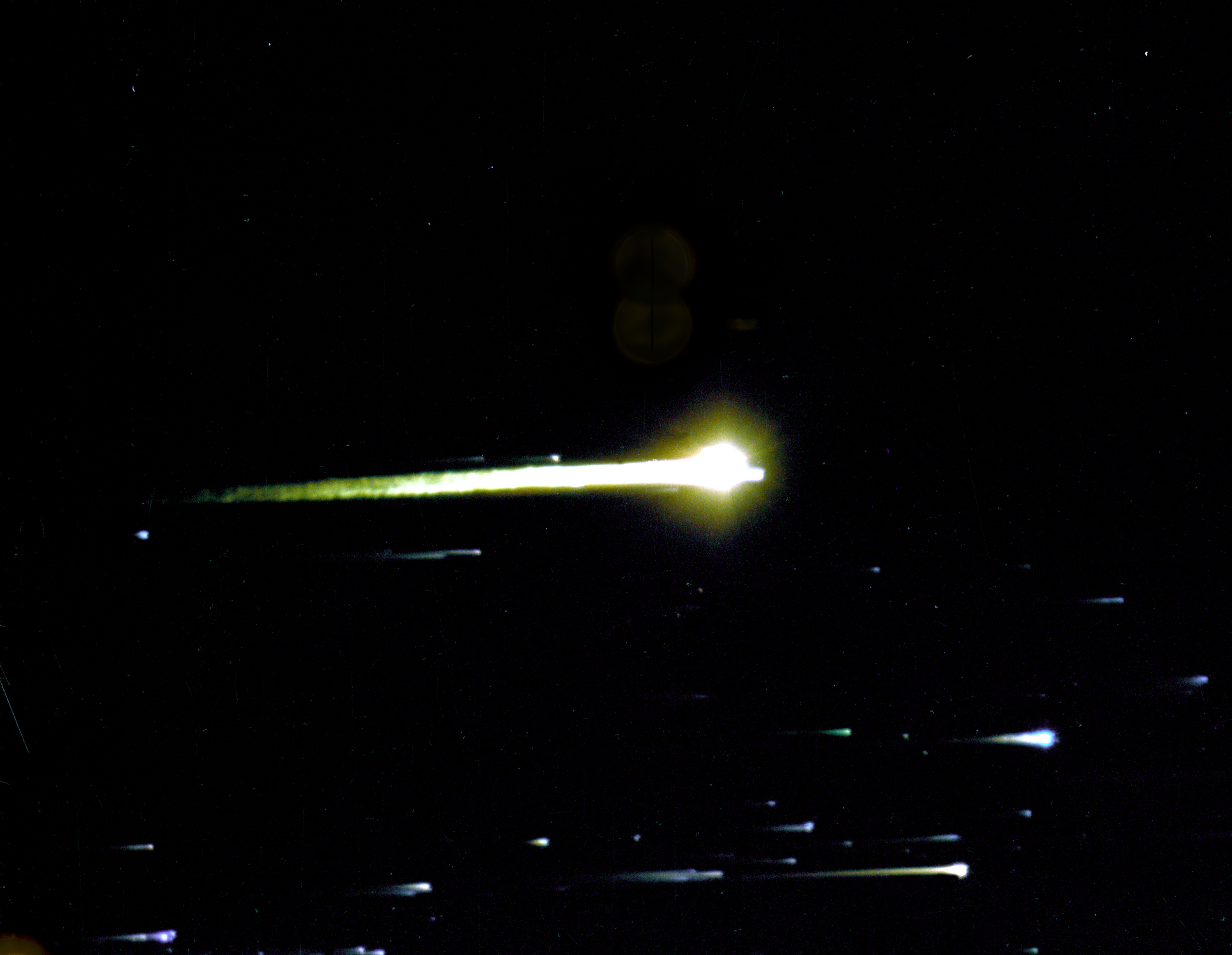
Reentry, December 27, 1968, photographed from a KC-135 Stratotanker at 40,000 feet

The cruise back to Earth was mostly a time for the crew to relax and monitor the spacecraft. As long as the trajectory specialists had calculated everything correctly, the spacecraft would reenter Earth's atmosphere two-and-a-half days after TEI and splash down in the Pacific.

On Christmas afternoon, the crew made their fifth television broadcast. This time, they gave a tour of the spacecraft, showing how an astronaut lived in space. When they finished broadcasting, they found a small present from Slayton in the food locker: a real turkey dinner with stuffing, in the same kind of pack given to the troops in Vietnam.

Another Slayton surprise was a gift of three miniature bottles of brandy, which Borman ordered the crew to leave alone until after they landed. They remained unopened, even years after the flight. There were also small presents to the crew from their wives. The next day, at about 124 hours into the mission, the sixth and final TV transmission showed the mission's best video images of the Earth, during a four-minute broadcast. After two uneventful days, the crew prepared for reentry. The computer would control the reentry, and all the crew had to do was put the spacecraft in the correct attitude, with the blunt end forward. In the event of computer failure, Borman was ready to take over.

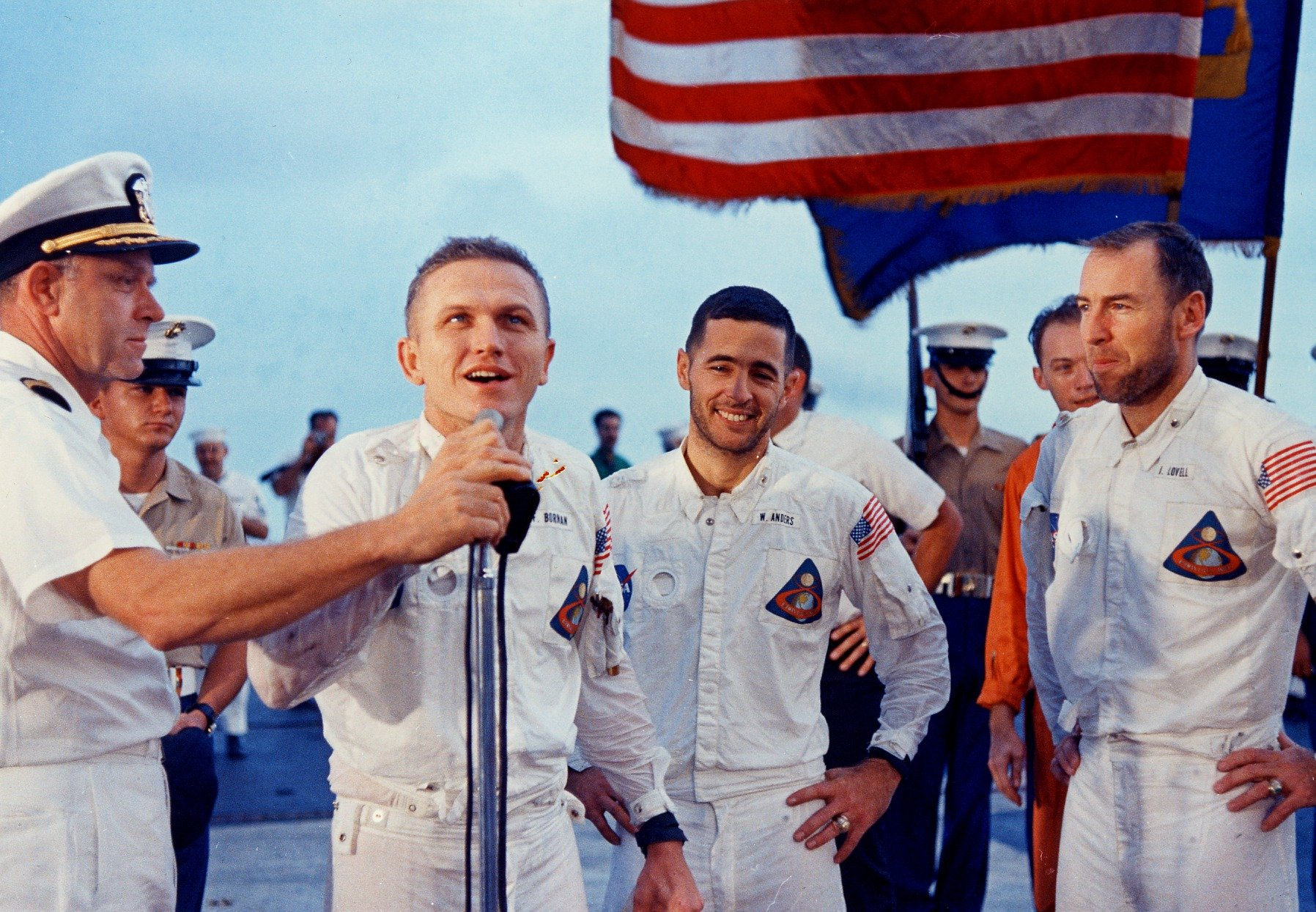
Crew of Apollo 8 addressing the crew of USS Yorktown after successful splashdown and recovery

Separation from the service module prepared the command module for reentry by exposing the heat shield and shedding unneeded mass. The service module would burn up in the atmosphere as planned. Six minutes before they hit the top of the atmosphere, the crew saw the Moon rising above the Earth's horizon, just as had been calculated by the trajectory specialists. As the module hit the thin outer atmosphere, the crew noticed that it was becoming hazy outside as glowing plasma formed around the spacecraft. The spacecraft started slowing down, and the deceleration peaked at 6 standard gravities (59 m/s^{2}). With the computer controlling the descent by changing the attitude of the spacecraft, Apollo 8 rose briefly like a skipping stone before descending to the ocean. At 30,000 feet (9.1 km), the drogue parachute deployed, stabilizing the spacecraft, followed at 10,000 feet (3.0 km) by the three main parachutes. The spacecraft splashdown position was officially reported as 8°8′N 165°1′W in the North Pacific Ocean, southwest of Hawaii at 15:51:42 UTC on December 27, 1968.

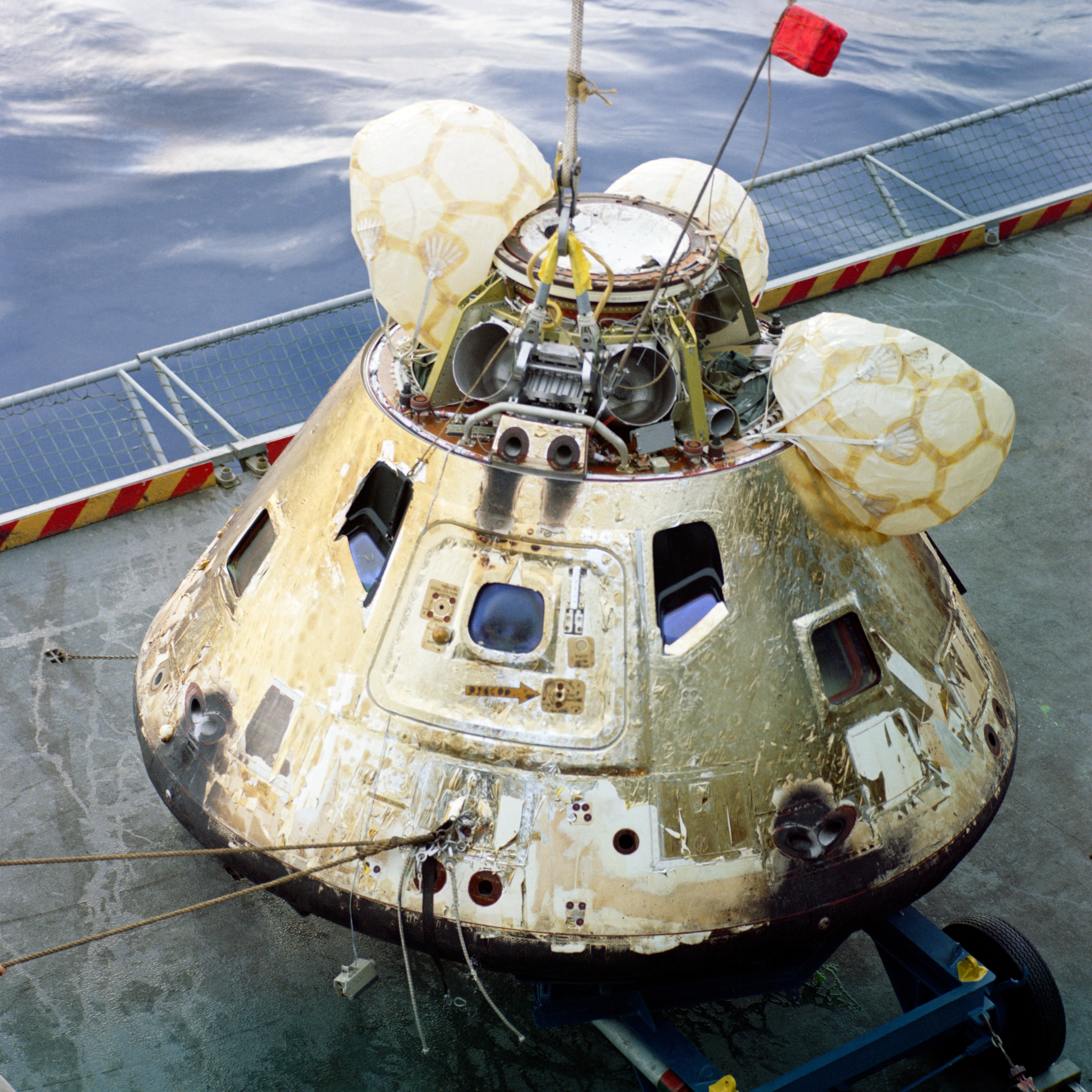
Command module on the deck of USS Yorktown

When the spacecraft hit the water, the parachutes dragged it over and left it upside down, in what was termed Stable 2 position. As they were buffeted by a 10-foot (3.0 m) swell, Borman vomited, waiting for the three flotation balloons to right the spacecraft. About six minutes after splashdown, the command module was righted into a normal apex-up (Stable 1) orientation by its inflatable bag uprighting system. The first US Navy frogman arrived 43 minutes after splashdown. Forty-five minutes later, the crew stepped onto the flight deck of the aircraft carrier Yorktown.

== Legacy ==
=== Historical importance ===
Apollo 8 came at the end of 1968, a year that had seen much upheaval in the United States and most of the world. Even though the year saw political assassinations, political unrest in the streets of Europe and America, and the Prague Spring, Time magazine chose the crew of Apollo 8 as its Men of the Year for 1968, recognizing them as the people who most influenced events in the preceding year. They had been the first people ever to leave the gravitational influence of the Earth and orbit another celestial body. They had survived a mission that even the crew themselves had rated as having only a fifty-fifty chance of fully succeeding. The effect of Apollo 8 was summed up in a telegram from a stranger, received by Borman after the mission, that stated simply, "Thank you Apollo 8. You saved 1968."

One of the most famous aspects of the flight was the Earthrise picture that the crew took as they came around for their fourth orbit of the Moon. This was the first time that humans had taken such a picture while actually behind the camera, and it has been credited as one of the inspirations of the first Earth Day in 1970. It was selected as the first of Life magazine's 100 Photographs That Changed the World.

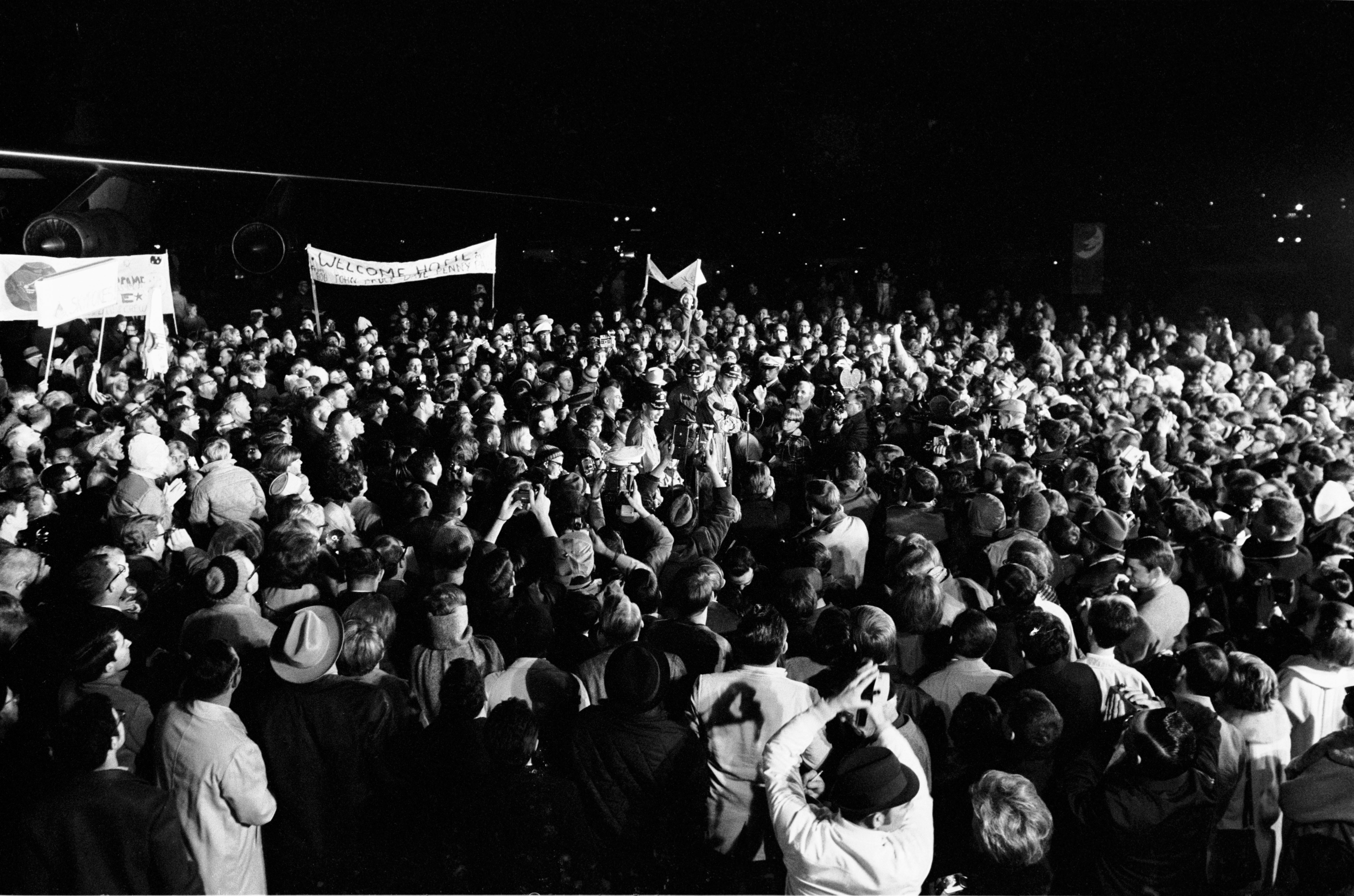
Apollo 8 astronauts return to Houston after their mission

Apollo 11 astronaut Michael Collins said, "Eight's momentous historic significance was foremost"; while space historian Robert K. Poole saw Apollo 8 as the most historically significant of all the Apollo missions. The mission was the most widely covered by the media since the first American orbital flight, Mercury-Atlas 6 by John Glenn, in 1962. There were 1,200 journalists covering the mission, with the BBC's coverage broadcast in 54 countries in 15 different languages. The Soviet newspaper Pravda featured a quote from Boris Nikolaevich Petrov, Chairman of the Soviet Interkosmos program, who described the flight as an "outstanding achievement of American space sciences and technology". It is estimated that a quarter of the people alive at the time saw—either live or delayed—the Christmas Eve transmission during the ninth orbit of the Moon. The Apollo 8 broadcasts won an Emmy Award, the highest honor given by the Academy of Television Arts & Sciences.

Madalyn Murray O'Hair, an atheist, later caused controversy by bringing a lawsuit against NASA over the reading from Genesis. O'Hair wanted the courts to ban American astronauts—who were all government employees—from public prayer in space. Though the case was rejected by the Supreme Court of the United States, apparently for lack of jurisdiction in outer space, it caused NASA to be skittish about the issue of religion throughout the rest of the Apollo program. Buzz Aldrin, on Apollo 11, self-communicated Presbyterian Communion on the surface of the Moon after landing; he refrained from mentioning this publicly for several years and referred to it only obliquely at the time.

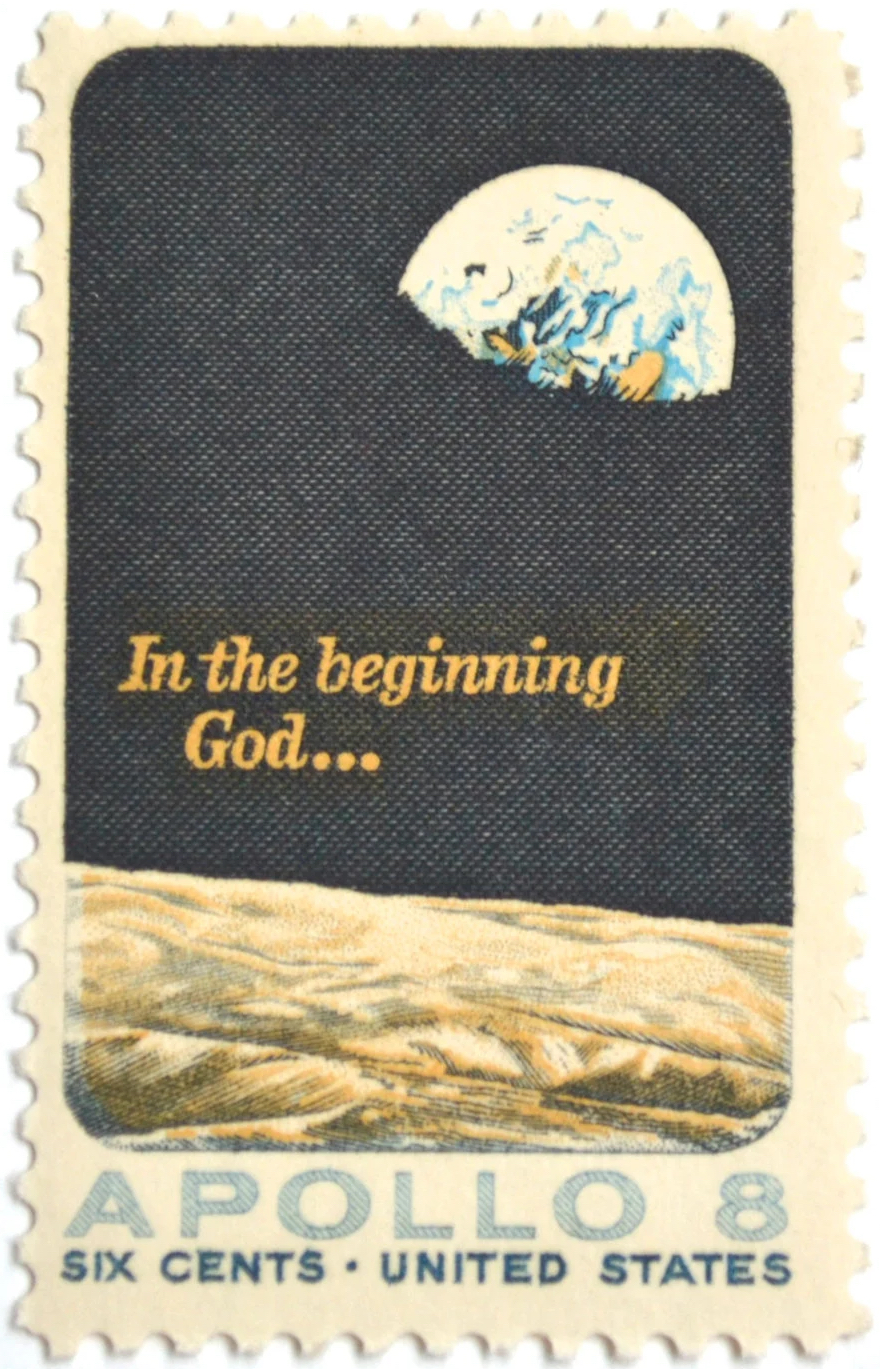
Apollo 8 commemorative stamp

In 1969, the United States Post Office Department issued a postage stamp (Scott catalogue #1371) commemorating the Apollo 8 flight around the Moon. The stamp featured a detail of the famous photograph of the Earthrise over the Moon taken by Anders on Christmas Eve, and the words, "In the beginning God ...", the first words of the book of Genesis. In January 1969, just 18 days after the crew's return to Earth, they appeared in the Super Bowl III pre-game show, reciting the Pledge of Allegiance, before the national anthem was performed by trumpeter Lloyd Geisler of the Washington National Symphony Orchestra. (Note: NFL's website erroneously states that Anita Bryant performed the anthem, but NBC's broadcast of game, available from the Paley Center for Media's collection, shows that Geisler performed it.)

=== Spacecraft location ===
In January 1970, the spacecraft was delivered to Osaka, Japan, for display in the U.S. pavilion at Expo '70. It is now displayed at the Chicago Museum of Science and Industry, along with a collection of personal items from the flight donated by Lovell and the space suit worn by Frank Borman. Jim Lovell's Apollo 8 space suit is on public display in the Visitor Center at NASA's Glenn Research Center. Bill Anders's space suit is on display at the Science Museum in London, United Kingdom.

=== In popular culture ===
Apollo 8's historic mission has been depicted and referred to in several forms, both documentary and fiction. The various television transmissions and 16 mm footage shot by the crew of Apollo 8 were compiled and released by NASA in the 1969 documentary Debrief: Apollo 8, hosted by Burgess Meredith. In addition, Spacecraft Films released, in 2003, a three-disc DVD set containing all of NASA's TV and 16 mm film footage related to the mission, including all TV transmissions from space, training and launch footage, and motion pictures taken in flight. Other documentaries include "Race to the Moon" (2005) as part of season 18 of American Experience and In the Shadow of the Moon (2007).

The 1994 album The Songs of Distant Earth by Mike Oldfield uses the Anders' reading for the cut "In The Beginning".

Parts of the mission are dramatized in the 1998 miniseries From the Earth to the Moon episode "1968". The S-IVB stage of Apollo 8 was also portrayed as the location of an alien device in the 1970 UFO episode "Conflict". Apollo 8's lunar orbit insertion was chronicled with actual recordings in the song "The Other Side", on the 2015 album The Race for Space, by the band Public Service Broadcasting.

==== In fiction ====
Kristine Kathryn Rusch's 2007 novella "Recovering Apollo 8" is set in an alternate timeline where the Apollo 8 malfunctioned and overshot the Moon's orbit. The plot revolves around attempts made between 2007 and 2068 (of that timeline) to recover the lost spacecraft and its crew.

== See also ==
- Apollo 8 (book)
- List of missions to the Moon

== Bibliography ==
- Bilstein, Roger E. (1996) [First published 1980]. Stages to Saturn: A Technological History of the Apollo/Saturn Launch Vehicles. The NASA History Series. Washington, D.C.: NASA. ISBN 0-16-048909-1. LCCN 97149850. NASA SP-4206.
- Brooks, Courtney G.; Grimwood, James M.; Swenson, Loyd S. Jr. (1979). Chariots for Apollo: A History of Manned Lunar Spacecraft. NASA History Series. Washington, D.C.: Scientific and Technical Information Branch, NASA. ISBN 978-0-486-46756-6. LCCN 79001042. OCLC 4664449. NASA SP-4205.
- Chaikin, Andrew (1994). A Man on the Moon: The Voyages of the Apollo Astronauts. New York: Viking. ISBN 978-0-670-81446-6. LCCN 93048680.
- Chaikin, Andrew (1998) [First published 1994]. A Man on the Moon. New York: Penguin Books. ISBN 978-0-14-027201-7.
- Collins, Michael (2001) [1974]. Carrying the Fire: An Astronaut's Journeys. New York: Cooper Square Press. ISBN 978-0-8154-1028-7. LCCN 2001017080.
- Cunningham, Walter (2010) [1977]. The All-American Boys. ipicturebooks. ISBN 978-1-876963-24-8. OCLC 713908039.
- De Groot, Gerard J. (2006). Dark Side of the Moon: The Magnificent Madness of the American Lunar Quest. New York: New York University Press. ISBN 978-0-8147-1995-4. LCCN 2006016116.
- Ertel, Ivan D.; Newkirk, Roland W.; Brooks, Courtney G. (1978). "The Apollo Spacecraft—A Chronology. Vol. IV. Part 3 (1969 3rd quarter)". Washington, D.C.: NASA. SP-4009.
- Hacker, Barton C.; Grimwood, James M. (1977). On the Shoulders of Titans: A History of Project Gemini (PDF). Washington, D.C.: National Aeronautics and Space Administration. SP-4203. Archived from the original (PDF) on June 29, 2007.
- Kluger, Jeffrey (2017). Apollo 8: The Thrilling Story of the First Mission to the Moon. Henry Holt. ISBN 9781627798327.
- Kranz, Gene (2000). Failure Is Not An Option. New York: Simon & Schuster. ISBN 978-0-7432-0079-0. OCLC 829406416.
- Lattimer, Dick (1985). All We Did Was Fly to the Moon. History-alive series. Alachua, Florida: Whispering Eagle Press. ISBN 978-0-9611228-0-5. LCCN 85222271.
- Logsdon, John M. (1976). The Decision to Go to the Moon: Project Apollo and the National Interest. Chicago: University of Chicago Press. Bibcode:1976dtgt.book.....L. OCLC 849992795.
- Lovell, Jim; Kluger, Jeffery (1994). Lost Moon: The Perilous Voyage of Apollo 13. Boston: Houghton Mifflin. ISBN 0-395-67029-2. LCCN 94028052.
- Murray, Charles; Cox, Catherine Bly (1990). Apollo: The Race to the Moon. New York: Simon & Schuster. ISBN 978-0-671-70625-8.
- Orloff, Richard W. (2000). Apollo by the Numbers: A Statistical Reference. NASA History Series. Washington, D.C.: NASA History Division, Office of Policy and Plans. ISBN 978-0-16-050631-4. LCCN 00061677. OCLC 829406439. NASA SP-2000-4029.
- Phillips, Samuel C. (1975). "The Shakedown Cruises". In Cortright, Edgar M (ed.). Apollo Expeditions to the Moon. Washington, D.C.: NASA. OCLC 1623434. NASA SP-350. Archived from the original on February 19, 2008.
- Poole, Robert K. (2008). Earthrise: How Man First Saw the Earth. New Haven, Connecticut: Yale University Press. ISBN 978-0-300-13766-8. LCCN 2008026764.
- Schefter, James (1999). The Race: The Uncensored Story of How America Beat Russia to the Moon. New York: Doubleday. ISBN 978-0-385-49253-9. LCCN 98054430.
- Sullivan, Robert, ed. (2003). 100 Photographs That Changed the World. New York: Time, Inc. Home Entertainment. ISBN 1-931933-84-7. OCLC 987934269.
- Wilford, John Noble (1973). We Reach the Moon. Putnam Publishing Group. ISBN 978-0-448-26152-2.
- Woods, W. David (2008). How Apollo Flew to the Moon. Brelin; New York: Springer. ISBN 978-0-387-71675-6. LCCN 2007932412.

Preceded by Gemini 11 crew	Human altitude record 1968-1969	Succeeded by Apollo 10 crew
