= Friend zone =

Inability to move from a platonic relationship into a romantic one

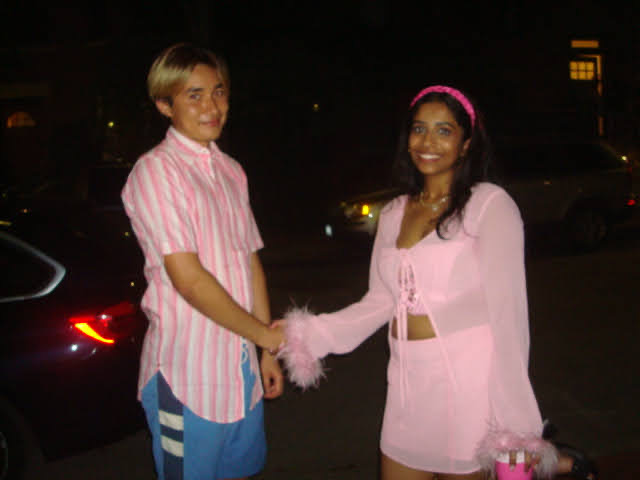
Two partygoers demonstrating the "friend zone" in Boston, MA, 2023

In popular culture, the friend zone (or friendzone) is a relational concept, describing a situation in which one person in a mutual friendship wishes to enter into a romantic or sexual relationship with the other person, while the other does not. The person whose romantic advances were rejected is then said to have "entered" (or to have been "put in") the friend zone, with the sense that they are stuck there. The friend zone has a strong presence on the Internet; for example, on Facebook, dating sites, and other social media platforms. However, over time, the term has expanded into middle schools, high schools, and colleges where young people are discovering their identities when it comes to dating and romance.

The concept of the friend zone has been criticized by some as misogynistic, because of a belief that the concept implies an expectation that women should be romantically involved with men in whom they have no interest, simply because the men were nice to them. However, the term refers to all forms of unrequited affection, not necessarily a man having a romantic interest in a woman. It is also closely associated with so-called "nice guy syndrome".

The term was originally popularized in the American sitcom television series Friends (1994). In the seventh episode of the first season, "The One with the Blackout", Ross Geller is lovesick for Rachel Green, but Joey Tribbiani informs him that, when two people meet, there is a short period in which there is potential for a romantic relationship that Ross has gone beyond. After this time, if they continue to see each other, they are in the "friend zone" and so a romantic relationship is effectively impossible, even if one of the parties wants to be the other's lover.

== Terminology ==
The term friend zone can be verbified, as in the sentence "So, she's friend-zoned you." It is described as "[a] situation in which a friendship exists between two people, one of whom has an unreciprocated romantic or sexual interest in the other." Although the term is apparently gender-neutral, the friend zone is often used to describe a situation in a male-female relationship in which the male is in the friend zone and the female is the object of his unrequited desire, or vice versa, where the female is being friend-zoned by the male, although less common. The person who does the friend-zoning is referred to as the friend-zoner, whereas the person who gets friend-zoned is called the friend-zonee.

The term friend zone is sometimes used in pickup artist (PUA) literature, where it forms part of PUA theories about female sexual attraction to males.

== Research ==
Binghamton University did a study on undergraduates from a midsize university in the northeastern United States. There were 562 participants with 305 identified as female and 257 as male. Of the 562 participants, 427 were exclusively heterosexual while 113 were not exclusively heterosexual. The participants were asked "Have you ever friend-zoned someone else?" and "Have you ever been friend-zoned?" The study found that 65.7% of exclusively heterosexual males have friend-zoned someone while 92.6% of exclusively heterosexual females have friend-zoned someone. The study also found that 75.2% of exclusively heterosexual males have been friend-zoned before while only 41.2% of exclusively heterosexual females have been friend-zoned before.

== Background ==
Writer Jeremy Nicholson in Psychology Today suggested that a romantic pursuer, in order to avoid being rejected up front, uses a ploy of acting friendly as a "back door" way into a hoped-for relationship. When this method does not work, the pursuer consequently is placed in the friend zone.

According to some psychologists, the man in a cross-gender friendship is more likely to be attracted to his woman friend than she is to him, and he is more likely to overestimate her interest in a romantic or sexual relationship.

== Criticism of the term ==
Feminist writers such as Rivu Dasgupta and Amanda Marcotte have argued that the friend zone concept is misogynistic. Dasgupta sees the friend zone as being rooted in male narcissism. The nice guy concept has been criticized as a gender trope with an underlying message that kind acts demand a sexual or romantic reward. Dasgupta and Marcotte say that the concept implies that if a woman and a man have a platonic friendship and the man becomes romantically attracted to the woman, then the woman has an obligation to return his affection. A woman who does not return her "nice guy" male friend's affection is viewed negatively or seen to be at fault. Ryan Milner of the College of Charleston argued that the friend zone concept is a nuanced and harmful aspect of patriarchal authority and male domination.

The Guardian contributor Ally Fogg argues that while the friend zone does not exist in a literal sense, men who use the term "friend zone" are not necessarily misogynists who feel entitled to sex. He states the term's usage reflects a genuine emotional experience for straight men with low self-esteem and self-confidence. He places blame on ingrained gender roles. Being rejected by a potential partner does not mean a person has been friend-zoned; it means that potential partner does not want to pursue a romantic relationship.

== In popular culture ==
The term was popularized by a 1994 episode of the American sitcom Friends entitled "The One with the Blackout", where the character Ross Geller, who was lovesick for Rachel Green, was described by character Joey Tribbiani as being the "mayor of the friend zone".

Chris Rock mentions the term in his 1996 "Bring the Pain" skit. He says that women have male friends, but these men are friends with women they "haven't fucked yet". Rock then claims that men who have platonic friends is because of an accident and ending up in the friend zone is because of a "wrong turn somewhere".

The 2005 romantic comedy film Just Friends's main plot device is that the protagonist Chris Brander (played by Ryan Reynolds) is "friend-zoned" by his best friend (and secret love interest since school) Jamie Palamino (played by Amy Smart).

The Cartoon Network series Regular Show brings up and shows the friend zone on a regular basis, as one of the show's main characters, Mordecai, and his friend Margaret experience shifts in their relationship.

MTV aired a reality show entitled FriendZone from 2011 to 2013. Each episode is based around "crushers" who are friends with the "crushees" but want to begin relationships with them.

American disc jockey and record producer Marshmello's 2018 hit "Friends" featuring vocals by British singer Anne-Marie, features themes of feeling friend-zoned, with Marie having gone on to self-proclaim it the "friend-zone anthem" in remarks made on Genius, with its Hannah Lux Davis-directed music video echoing the song's sentiments, with Marshmello attempting to win Anne-Marie's love, but, in turn, Anne-Marie just wants to be friends with him.

In the 2025 American animated heist comedy film The Bad Guys 2 produced by DreamWorks Animation, the sequel to 2022's The Bad Guys, both loosely based on the book series of the same name by Australian children's author and former actor Aaron Blabey about a gang of anthropomorphic animals known as the title "Bad Guys" attempting to perform good deeds to change society's perception of them as criminals, Mr. Wolf, leader of the titular "Bad Guys" (voiced by Sam Rockwell), in one scene, mentions feeling friend-zoned by the in-universe state governor and his friend and former critic Diane Foxington/"The Crimson Paw" (voiced by Zazie Beetz), his implied love interest in the first film, although in a later scene of the aforementioned sequel, this is presumably resolved as the two share their first kiss (and become a couple overall).

== See also ==
- Attachment in adults
- Bad boy archetype
- Cockblock
- Cross-sex friendship
- Infatuation
- Nice guy
- Unrequited love
