= Sex differences in narcissism =

Personality trait of self-love, as differentiated by gender

In gender studies, the analysis of gender differences in narcissism suggests that male narcissism and female narcissism differ in a number of aspects.

In Jeffrey Kluger’s 2014 book: “The Narcissist Next Door”, the author states that our society, still largely patriarchal, is more likely to tolerate male narcissism and aggressiveness compared to when those same traits present in females.

In 2015, a number of media outlets reported a study at the University at Buffalo, which analyzed 31 years of data of narcissism research and concluded that men consistently scored higher in the first two of three aspects of the Narcissistic Personality Inventory: leadership/authority, exploitative/entitlement, and grandiose/exhibitionism.

However, recent research suggests narcissistic women don't display the same traits associated with narcissism in men. Women with narcissistic personality traits are less likely to be diagnosed as a narcissist, presenting more of a “vulnerable narcissism.”

The team leader of the research, Emily Grijalva, commented that on average this difference is slight (a one-quarter of a standard deviation) and there was almost no difference in the exhibitionism dimension (which covers such aspects as vanity, self-absorption and attention-seeking). A similar degree of difference has been observed for other personality traits, e.g., slightly higher neuroticism for women (neuroticism has been linked to vulnerable narcissism) and slightly higher risk-taking for men.

Research has found that women tend to be more clandestine with their narcissism, with vulnerable narcissism being more common in women and much harder to diagnose: "Narcissistic women are abusing in ways that society allows. They often leverage their femininity, present themselves as soft-spoken, but it is cunning; it's premeditated" says Dr Green. Green added: "These findings show that narcissistic women are less likely to manifest the stereotypical expressions of grandiose narcissism that closely resemble masculine features of males in society, potentially due to fears of receiving backlash for violating feminine gender stereotypes.

The reasons of reported gender difference were outside the scope of the study, however the authors speculated that it is rooted in historically established social conventions about what is acceptable for a particular gender and what are the traditional social roles for genders.

A number of earlier studies (on smaller scales) reported similar bias. A further indication for the trend was a 2008 finding that the lifetime narcissistic personality disorder is more prevalent for men (7.7%) than for women (4.8%).

A 2023 comprehensive study published in the Journal of Personality and Social Psychology measured gender differences in narcissism among a sample size of over 250,000 people, found that men scored higher in narcissism than women.
