= The New York Big Band Concert =

Video by Harry Connick Jr.
- Released: VHS: September 7, 1993; DVD: June 15, 1999
- Recorded: Live at the Paramount Theatre, New York City, 1992
- Genre: Jazz
- Length: 56:22
- Label: Sony
- Director: Jill Goodacre

Harry Connick Jr. chronology
Swinging Out Live (1991)	The New York Big Band Concert (1993)	The Harry Connick Jr. Christmas Special (1994)

Alternative cover
- DVD cover (1999)

Professional ratings
Review scores
Source	Rating
Allmusic	2.5/5 stars

The New York Big Band Concert is a live performance DVD with Harry Connick Jr. and his big band.

== Track listing ==
1. Sweet Georgia Brown (Kenneth Casey, Maceo Pinkard, Ben Bernie) – 3:29
2. Don't Get Around Much Anymore (Duke Ellington, Bob Russell) – 5:12
3. Recipe For Love (Harry Connick Jr.) – 2:27
4. Bare Necessities (Terry Gilkyson) – 3:15
5. They Can't Take That Away from Me (George Gershwin, Ira Gershwin) – 6:11
6. You Didn't Know Me When (Connick, Ramsey McLean) – 3:10
7. He Is They Are (Connick) – 4:04
8. With Imagination (Connick, McLean) – 8:07
9. We Are In Love (Connick) – 2:30
10. It Had To Be You (Isham Jones, Gus Kahn) – 2:10
11. Just Kiss Me (Connick) – 5:20
12. All Of Me (Gerald Marks, Seymour Simons) – 8:25
13. Paramount Fanfare

== Award ==
- 1993 Emmy Award winner – Outstanding Individual Achievement in Sound Mixing for a Variety or Music Series or a Special
  - Gregg Rubin (pre-production mixer/re-recording mixer)
  - Randy Ezratty (production mixer)
  - John Alberts (master)

== See also ==
- Blue Light, Red Light

== Certifications ==
- RIAA certification: Video longform – Gold (June 24, 2002)
