= The One with the Blackout =

- Friends episode
- Episode no.: Season 1 Episode 7
- Directed by: James Burrows
- Written by: Jeff Astrof & Mike Sikowitz
- Original air date: November 3, 1994

Guest appearances
- Jill Goodacre as herself; Larry Hankin as Mr. Heckles (credited as "Weird Guy"); Cosimo Fusco as Paolo

Episode chronology
← Previous "The One with the Butt"	Next → "The One Where Nana Dies Twice"
- Friends season 1

"The One with the Blackout" is the seventh episode of the first season of the NBC television series Friends. The seventh episode of the show overall, it was first broadcast on November 3, 1994.

In the episode, there's a blackout in the city, and Chandler gets stuck in an ATM vestibule with Jill Goodacre and Ross attempts to tell Rachel his feelings for her.

This episode coined the term "friend zone".

== Plot ==
The episode begins with Monica, Rachel, Ross, and Joey watching Phoebe begin an acoustic set at Central Perk, only to get interrupted by a sudden blackout in New York City.

Chandler gets trapped in an ATM vestibule with Jill Goodacre, a Victoria's Secret model, and nervously tries to impress her in various ways. When she offers him some chewing gum, he reluctantly accepts and tries to blow a bubble with the gum only to spit it out accidentally. He then tries to chew the gum again, only to realize it is someone else's gum and then proceeds to choke on it from the shock. Jill gives him the Heimlich maneuver and saves his life, and the two spend the rest of the night hanging out and playing games together. When the lights come back on, Jill kisses Chandler on the cheek. A desperate Chandler then turns to the security camera in the corner and asks for a copy of the tape.

Back at Monica's apartment, the rest of the friends have a discussion on the weirdest place they have ever had sex and Rachel confesses that hers was "the foot of the bed". This leads to a conversation between her and Ross about how she wishes she had more excitement in her love life. Ross transposes his infatuation for her by predicting that her wish will come true in the future. Joey convinces Ross that he needs to tell Rachel how he feels about her before Ross enters the "friend zone".

Ross works up the courage to speak to Rachel but before he can confess his feelings, a stray cat attacks him. Rachel and Phoebe search for the owner in the building. The owner turns out to be new Italian neighbor Paolo, whose sudden appearance is disconcerting to Ross, who even tries to warn him off of Rachel despite him not understanding English. The last candle in the apartment goes out and everyone tries to make the scariest noise possible. During Ross's turn, the lights come back on and everyone sees Rachel and Paolo kissing.

== Reception ==
Purple Clover called the episode one of the 20 funniest episodes of Friends.

The A.V. Club called the episode "a little bit bland, a little too distressingly cliché".

The British website Digital Spy put the episode on their list of "Friends: The 15 Best Episodes of All Time".

Rolling Stone ranked the episode as one of the top 25 episodes of Friends.

The Hollywood Reporter ranked the episode as of the show's top 25, calling it "perfection".
