= Jill Goodacre =

American model and actress (born 1964)

- Born: March 29, 1964 (age 62); Lubbock, Texas, U.S.
- Other name: Jill Goodacre Connick
- Occupations: Model, actress
- Spouse: Harry Connick Jr. (m. 1994)
- Children: 3
- Mother: Glenna Goodacre

Jill Goodacre Connick (born March 29, 1964) is an American actress and former model. She was one of Victoria's Secret's main models in the 1980s and early 1990s. She is married to singer Harry Connick Jr.

== Career ==
=== Victoria's Secret ===
Goodacre was a primary lingerie and hosiery model for the relatively new Victoria's Secret company in its mail-order catalogs and retail stores in the 1980s, and she appeared extensively in the catalogs. Goodacre, Stephanie Seymour and Dutch model Frederique van der Wal helped Victoria's Secret grow from a new company to one of the world's giants in women's lingerie, hosiery, swimwear and clothing.

=== Other media ===
Goodacre appeared as herself in an episode ("The One with the Blackout") of the American sitcom Friends in 1994. Though billed as Jill Connick, she was called Jill Goodacre throughout the episode.

She directed one of her husband's live performance videos (The New York Big Band Concert) in 1992, and she appears in several of his music videos.

== Personal life ==
Born in Lubbock, Texas, Goodacre was raised in Boulder, Colorado. She is the daughter of real estate broker William Goodacre of Boulder, and sculptor Glenna Goodacre, a native of Lubbock who resided in Santa Fe, New Mexico. After her parents' divorce, her mother married Dallas attorney C.L. Mike Schmidt.

Goodacre met Harry Connick Jr. as a result of the filming of the 1990 movie Memphis Belle in which her boyfriend, D. B. Sweeney, acted with Connick. Goodacre and Connick were married in 1994 in a Roman Catholic wedding mass at St. Louis Cathedral in New Orleans. They have three daughters.

== Filmography ==
=== Actress ===
- 1981 Play for Today – Golda (TV)
- 1983 The Nation's Health – Val Kane (TV)
- 1986 Odd Jobs
- 1987 Worlds Beyond (TV)
- 1991 Simply Mad About the Mouse: A Musical Celebration of Imagination - herself, with Harry Connick Jr.
- 1994 Friends – Jill Goodacre (as herself, credited as Jill Connick) (TV) ("The One with the Blackout")
- 1997 Duckman (TV) (voice)
- 1997 The Uninvited – Rose (TV)

=== Director ===
- 1993 Harry Connick Jr.: The New York Big Band Concert (director)

=== Self ===
- 1993 Boxout – exercise video with Sugar Ray Leonard
