= Singin' & Swingin' =

Video by Harry Connick Jr.
- Released: 1990
- Genre: Jazz
- Length: 45:00
- Language: English
- Label: CBS
- Director: Jeb Brien

Harry Connick Jr. chronology
Singin' & Swingin' (1990)	Swinging Out Live (1991)

Professional ratings
Review scores
Source	Rating
Allmusic	3/5 stars

Singin' & Swingin' is the home video debut of Harry Connick, Jr. from 1990 at the age of 22. The video contains five musicvideos, and three songs performed live at the Dominion Theatre in London, as well as an exclusive interview. The VHS was released simultaneously with his big band album We Are in Love and his instrumental trio album Lofty's Roach Souffle.

Dr. John joins Connick on organ and vocals on "Do You Know What It Means To Miss New Orleans".

== Track listing ==
- "Do You Know What It Means to Miss New Orleans?" (Eddie DeLange, Louis Alter)
- "Stompin' at the Savoy" (Andy Razaf, Benny Goodman, Chick Webb, Edgar Sampson) (live)
- "Where or When" (Richard Rodgers, Lorenz Hart) (live)
- "I Could Write a Book" (Rodgers, Hart) (live)
- "Don't Get Around Much Anymore" (Duke Ellington, Bob Russell)
- "It Had to Be You" (Isham Jones, Gus Kahn)
- "One Last Pitch" (Harry Connick Jr., Joe Livingston)
- "Recipe For Love" (Connick)

== Certifications ==
- RIAA certification: Video longform - Gold (September 26, 1990)
