= Swinging Out Live =

Video by Harry Connick Jr. & his orchestra
- Released: January 29, 1991
- Genre: Jazz
- Length: 80 minutes
- Label: Sony Music Video Enterprises
- Producer: David Horn

Harry Connick Jr. chronology
Singin' & Swingin' (1990)	Swinging Out Live (1991)	The New York Big Band Concert (1993)

Professional ratings
Review scores
Source	Rating
Allmusic	4/5 stars

Swinging Out Live (1991) is a live performance VHS with Harry Connick Jr. and his orchestra. The concert was filmed in 1990 at the Majestic Theatre in Dallas, as part of his national tour. It was aired as part of PBS' Great Performances.

== Track listing ==
- "Hudson Bomber" (Harry Connick Jr.)
- "Anguilla"
- "Don't Get Around Much Anymore" (Duke Ellington, Bob Russell)
- "I Could Write a Book" (Lorenz Hart, Richard Rodgers)
- "All I Need Is the Girl" (Stephen Sondheim, Jule Styne)
- "Avalon" (Buddy De Sylva, Al Jolson, Vincent Rose)
- "Something's Gotta Give" (Johnny Mercer)
- "Forever, For Now" (Connick, Ramsey McLean)
- "Recipe for Love" (Connick)
- "How Deep Is the Ocean?" (Irving Berlin)
- "We Are in Love" (Connick)
- "It Had to Be You" (Isham Jones, Gus Kahn)
- "It's All Right With Me" (Cole Porter)
- "When the Saints Go Marching In" (traditional)
- "Do You Know What It Means to Miss New Orleans?" (Louis Alter, Eddie DeLange)

== Certifications ==
- RIAA certification: Video longform – Platinum (March 26, 1991)
