= Lost Moon =

1994 non-fiction book by Jim Lovell and Jeffrey Kluger

Lost Moon: The Perilous Voyage of Apollo 13
- Cover of the Lost Moon first edition
- Author: Jim Lovell and Jeffrey Kluger
- Language: English
- Subject: Aerospace engineering
- Genre: Non-fiction
- Published: 1994 (Houghton Mifflin Company); 1995 (Pocket Books)
- Publication place: United States
- Media type: Print
- Pages: 378 (first edition)
- ISBN: 0-395-67029-2
- Dewey Decimal: 629.45

Lost Moon: The Perilous Voyage of Apollo 13 (published in paperback as Apollo 13) is a 1994 non-fiction book by astronaut Jim Lovell and journalist Jeffrey Kluger, about the failed April 1970 Apollo 13 lunar landing mission which Lovell commanded. The book is the basis of the 1995 film adaptation Apollo 13, directed by Ron Howard and starring Tom Hanks as Lovell.

Lovell was initially approached by Kluger in 1991 about collaborating on the book. Fred Haise was not interested in the collaboration, and Jack Swigert had died of cancer in 1982.

== Background ==
Apollo 13 was the third mission of the Apollo program intended to land men on the Moon. An explosion of an onboard liquid oxygen tank in the Service Module, when the craft was close to reaching the Moon, crippled the electrical power generation and propulsion systems for the Command Module Odyssey. This necessitated the abort of the lunar landing, and placed the lives of astronauts Lovell, Jack Swigert, and Fred Haise in serious jeopardy. The mission became famous for the safe return of the men, made possible by the flight controllers' resourceful adaptation of the electrical, propulsion, and life support systems of the Lunar Module Aquarius as a "lifeboat".

== Physical description ==
- Hardcover, 378 pages
- Publisher: Houghton Mifflin (T) (October 1994)
- Language: English
- ISBN 0-395-67029-2
- Dimensions: 1.5 × 6.2 × 9.2 inches

== Bibliography ==
- James Lovell; Jeffrey Kluger (1994). Lost Moon. Houghton Mifflin. ISBN 0-395-67029-2.
- James Lovell; Jeffrey Kluger (1995). Apollo 13. Pocket Books. ISBN 0671534645.
- James Lovell; Jeffrey Kluger (1995). Apollo 13 (in Spanish). Barcelona Ediciones. ISBN 84-406-5685-8.
