= Jeffrey Kluger =

Senior writer at Time magazine

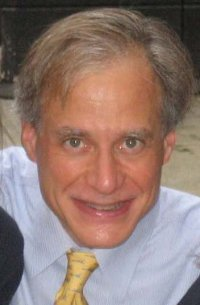
- Kluger in 2008
- Born: 1954 (age 71–72)
- Notable work: Lost Moon: The Perilous Voyage of Apollo 13

Signature
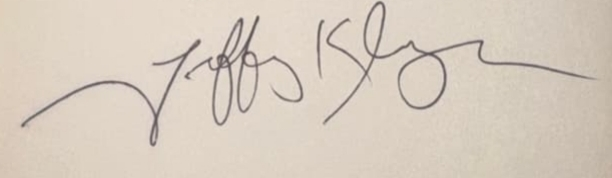

Jeffrey Kluger (born 1954) is an American editor at large at Time magazine and author of thirteen books on various topics, such as The Narcissist Next Door (2014); Splendid Solution: Jonas Salk and the Conquest of Polio (2005); The Sibling Effect (2011); and Lost Moon: The Perilous Voyage of Apollo 13 (1994). The latter work was the basis for Ron Howard's film Apollo 13 (1995). He is also the author of two novels for young adults: Nacky Patcher and the Curse of the Dry-Land Boats (2007) and Freedom Stone (2011), and one novel for adults, Holdout (2021).

== Early life and education ==
Jeffrey Kluger was born in 1954 to a Jewish Family. Kluger attended Pikesville High School in Pikesville, Maryland, a northwest suburb of Baltimore. He attended the University of Maryland and earned a Bachelor of Arts degree in political science in 1976, and the University of Baltimore Law School, where he earned a Juris Doctor degree in 1979. He is a licensed attorney, and was admitted to the state bar in the Commonwealth of Pennsylvania.

== Career ==
From July 1987 to September 1996, Kluger was a staff writer for Discover magazine, writing the humor column "Light Elements". He also worked as a writer and editor for The New York Times Business World Magazine, Family Circle magazine, Science Digest, and The Soho Weekly News.

Kluger began his work with Time magazine in 1996 specializing in science coverage. He was named a senior writer in 1998, and Editor at Large in 2014. During his tenure at Time, Kluger has written articles covering the Mars Pathfinder landing and the 2003 Columbia disaster. He is the author or co-author of more than 45 cover stories, including Time's coverage of the Oklahoma tornadoes of 2013, the Fukushima disaster in 2011, the battle to eradicate polio (2011) and the developing science of caring for premature babies (2014).

Kluger has authored numerous books, most notably Lost Moon: The Perilous Voyage of Apollo 13 (October 1994), with coauthor Jim Lovell. Lost Moon would become the basis for the Ron Howard film Apollo 13 (1995) starring Tom Hanks. Kluger would later be a technical consultant for, and appear in, the movie Apollo 13: The IMAX Experience.

Kluger has taught journalism at New York University.

== Awards and honors ==
In 2001, the Overseas Press Club of the United States of America awarded Kluger and Michael Lemonick the Whitman Bassow Award for "best reporting in any medium on international environmental issues" for their work on global warming.

== Bibliography ==
- The Apollo adventure : the making of the Apollo Space Program and the movie Apollo 13. New York: Pocket Books. 1995.
- "Dr. Sigmund Doolittle". Light Elements. Discover. 17 (2): 84–87. February 1996.
- "CIA ESP". Light Elements. Discover. 17 (4): 34, 37–38. April 1996.
- Journey Beyond Selene: Remarkable Expeditions Past Our Moon and to the Ends of the Solar System. July 1999. ISBN 0-684-84765-5.
- Kluger, Jeffrey (July 2001). Moon Hunters: NASA's Remarkable Expeditions to the Ends of the Solar System. Simon and Schuster. ISBN 978-0-684-86559-1.
- Splendid Solution: Jonas Salk and the Conquest of Polio. January 2005. ISBN 978-0-399-15216-0.
- Kluger, Jeffrey (June 2007). Nacky Patcher & the Curse of the Dry-Land Boats. ISBN 978-0-399-24604-3. (A children's book)
- Simplexity: Why Simple Things Become Complex (and How Complex Things Can be Made Simple). Hyperion. June 3, 2008. ISBN 978-1-4013-0301-3.
- The Sibling Effect: What the Bonds Among Brothers and Sisters Reveal About Us (4th Printing ed.). Riverhead Hardcover. September 15, 2011. ISBN 1594488312.
- Apollo 8: The Thrilling Story of the First Mission to the Moon. Henry Holt. 2017. ISBN 9781627798327.
- The narcissist next door. 2014.
- "TheBrief TIME with ... Brian Greene". Time Magazine. 195 (7–8) (International ed.): 12–13. March 2–9, 2020.
- Holdout. 2021.
- Gemini: Stepping Stone to the Moon, the Untold Story. 2025.
- Lost moon
