= Tat Tong =

American songwriter

Tat Tong 唐达
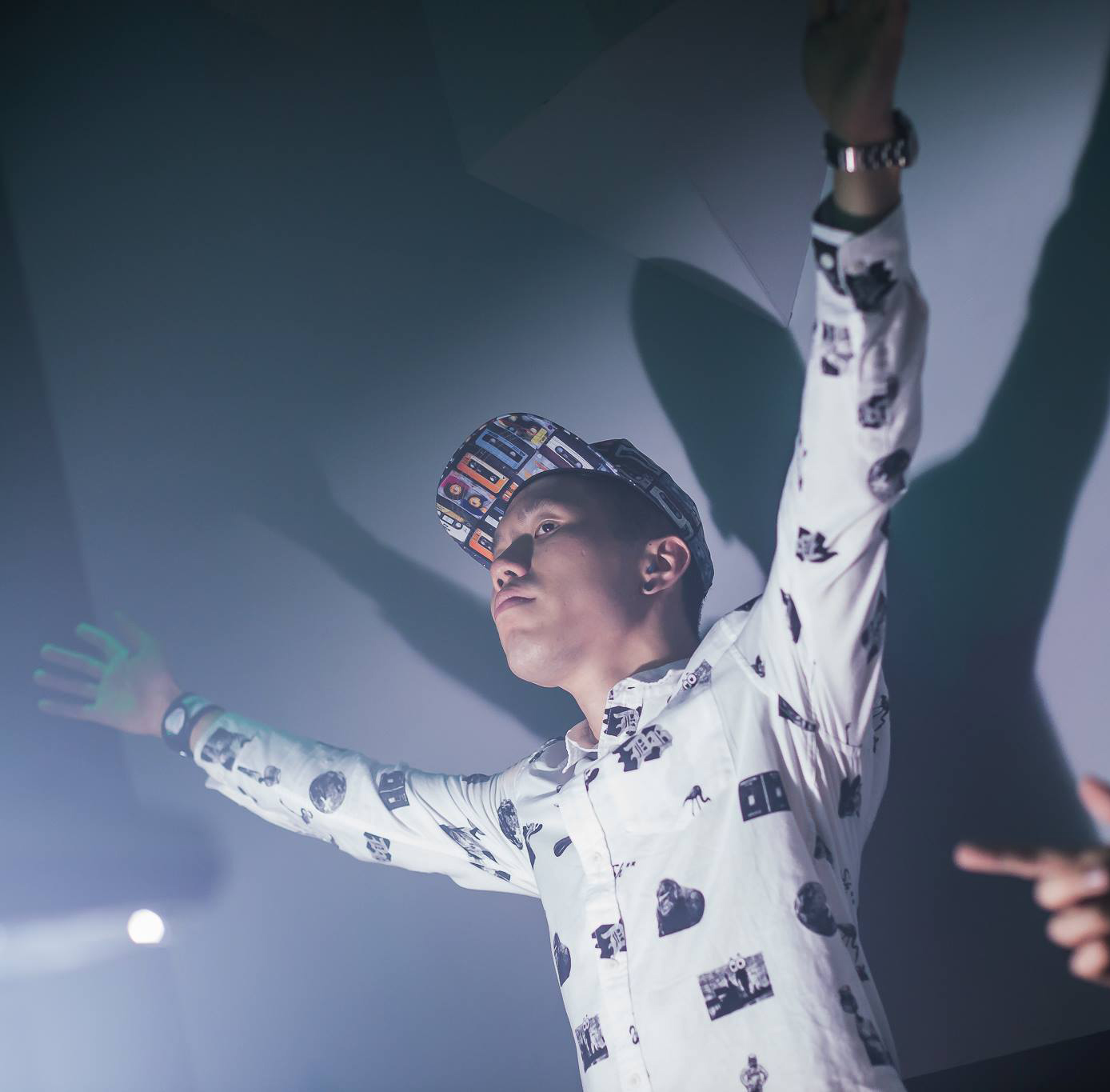

Background information
- Born: Tong Hong Tat; Singapore
- Genres: Pop, rock, R&B, dance, Hip hop
- Occupations: Songwriter, record producer, music executive

Tat Tong; born Tong Hong Tat; is a Singaporean record producer and songwriter who is based in Los Angeles. His discography has gone 80× platinum, with over 20 #1 hits out of over 60 Top 20 hits worldwide.

As a producer-songwriter, Tong's portfolio spans North America, Central/South America, Europe, Asia, and Australia, including artists like Luis Fonsi, Troye Sivan, Hailee Steinfeld, Monsta X, Kaskade, CNCO, Sebastian Yatra, CD9, Aitana, ShiNEE, JJ Lin, Vanness Wu, and Wang Lee Hom.

He is also a lyricist for the upcoming Warner Brothers-produced Broadway musical "Crazy Rich Asians: The Musical", alongside lyricist Amanda Green, songwriter Helen Park, and book writer Leah Nanako Winkler.

== Early life ==
Growing up in Singapore, Tong studied piano and composition at Yamaha Music Foundation. In 2001, he accepted a scholarship from the Singapore Armed Forces to study Computer Science at Cornell University in Ithaca, NY, and following that, served his scholarship bond in the Republic of Singapore Navy for 6 years before transitioning into a full-time music career in 2011. At Cornell, Tong sang in the Cornell University Glee Club.

== Current career ==
Tong co-produced and co-wrote Troye Sivan's "Happy Little Pill" from his 2014 TRXYE album, which was certified Gold in Australia, charted at #1 on iTunes in 55 countries, and reached #5 on the Billboard 200 chart, making him the first Singaporean to have an entry in the Top 10 of the Billboard 200. He also cowrote American DJ Elephante's single "Age Of Innocence" featuring Trouze and Damon Sharpe which charted in the Top 20 on the Billboard Dance charts.

In the Latin music space, Tong co-produced and co-wrote the Mandarin remix of "Despacito" by Luis Fonsi featuring JJ Lin. He also co-wrote "Apaga La Luz" from Fonsi's 2019 album "Vida" which was nominated for Best Latin Pop Album in the 62nd Grammy Awards, reached #1 on Billboard's US Top Latin Albums and US Latin Pop Albums, #18 on the Billboard 200, and was certified 22× platinum in the United States. He co-wrote and co-produced "Estoy Enamorado De Ti" from CNCO's self-titled 2018 album which reached #1 on Billboard's US Top Latin Albums, #33 on the Billboard 200, and was certified platinum in the United States. He also co-produced and co-wrote CD9's 2016 album "Evolution" with Jovany Javier as well as Luis Salazar of The Dro1dz, which was certified platinum and charted at #1 in Mexico.

Tong's global credits with The Swaggernautz also include work with Santana, Pitbull, Project 46, A-mei, Karen Mok, Show Lo, 2PM, Vanness Wu, Coco Lee, JJ Lin, and Kit Chan.

Tong is also a speaker and co-host of the Gamechangers Music Seminar series, and is a noted producer in the contemporary a cappella community.

== Awards ==
- COMPASS (Composers and Authors Society of Singapore) 'Wings Of Excellence' Award for overseas achievements
- COMPASS (Composers and Authors Society of Singapore) 'Top Local English Pop Song' Award for 'Happy Little Pill' (Troye Sivan)

== Partial discography ==
- Luis Fonsi, JJ Lin: "Despacito (Mandarin Remix)", Universal Music Latin Entertainment
- Luis Fonsi: "Apaga La Luz", Universal Music Latin Entertainment
- CNCO: "Estoy Enamorado De Ti", Sony Music Latin
- Monsta X, Sebastian Yatra: "Magnetic", Universal Music Latin Entertainment
- ShiNEE: "Tell Me Your Name", SM Entertainment
- Troye Sivan: "Happy Little Pill", Universal Music Latin Entertainment
- JJ Lin: "Resurgence", Warner Music Taiwan
- JJ Lin: "Sanctuary", Warner Music Taiwan
- Vanness Wu: "Rang Wo Geng Ai Wo", Sony Music Taiwan
- Wang Leehom: "World Without Tears"
- Kaskade: "Come Play With Me", Arkade
- Elephante feat. Trouze and Damon Sharpe: "Age of Innocence", Armada Music
- Project 46: "Beautiful It Hurts", Ultra Records
- Trouze: "Intersection", "Splash", "Busy"
- Juanes, Alvaro Soler: "Arte", Universal Music Latin Entertainment
- CD9 feat. Crayon Pop: "Get Dumb", Sony Music Mexico
- CD9:"Deja Vu", "Guilty Pleasure" Sony Music Mexico
- Anahí feat. Gente De Zona: "Arena Y Sol", Universal Music Latin Entertainment
- Anahí feat. Julión Álvarez: "Eres", Universal Music Latin Entertainment
- Christina Grimmie: "Shrug"
- Hins Cheung: "Sweet Escape", FITTO Records / EEG Music Entertainment
- Hins Cheung: "Triggered", FITTO Records / EEG Music Entertainment
