= Thomas Gold discography =

This is the discography of German DJ Thomas Gold.

== Compilation albums ==
- One Love (Australia, 2008)
- DJ Series – Thomas Gold (2008)
- Axtone Presents Thomas Gold [Axtone, 2012]
- Armada Invites (In The Mix: Thomas Gold) [Armada Music, 2017]

== Extended plays ==
Title	Details	Track listing
Paintbootiqa (with Björn Mandry)	Release date: 3 April 2006; Label: Mauritius; Format: Digital download	No. / Title / Length; 1. / "Should Be" / 7:49; 2. / "Feel Good" / 6:52
Revelation (Part 1)	Release date: 31 March 2017; Label: Armada Music; Format: Digital download	No. / Title / Length; 1. / "Magic" (featuring Jillian Edwards) / 2:50; 2. / "Survive" (featuring Ida Hallquist) / 2:52; 3. / "Sanctuary" (featuring TLJ) / 4:50; 4. / "Better Versions Of Myself" / 2:38; 5. / "Saints & Sinners" (featuring M.BRONX) / 3:18
Club Files #1	Release date: 20 December 2019; Label: Fanfare Records; Format: Digital download	No. / Title / Length; 1. / "Ain't Seen Before" (featuring Emy Perez) / 4:19; 2. / "Nobody" / 3:37; 3. / "Ready for the Drums" / 3:54; 4. / "Do You Love Me" / 3:37
Club Files #2	Release date: 13 March 2020; Label: Fanfare Records; Format: Digital download	No. / Title / Length; 1. / "Club Guerilla" / 2:05; 2. / "Keep Your Head Spin" (with FineRefined) / 2:18; 3. / "Here We Go" / 2:27; 4. / "Drop It (Dam Dam)" / 2:02

== Singles ==
=== Charted singles ===
Year	Title	Peak chart positions		Album
Year	Title	BEL (Fl) Tip	BEL (Wa)	Album
2009	"Everybody Be Somebody" (with Matthias Menck)	—^{[A]}	—	Non-album singles
2010	"The Button"	—^{[B]}	—	Non-album singles
2011	"Alive" (with Dirty South featuring Kate Elsworth)	64	—^{[C]}	Non-album singles
2012	"Eyes Wide Open" (with Dirty South featuring Kate Elsworth)	—^{[D]}	—	Non-album singles
2014	"Colourblind" (featuring Kate Elsworth)	—^{[E]}	—	Non-album singles
2017	"Magic" (featuring Jillian Edwards)	26	—	Non-album singles
"—" denotes a recording that did not chart or was not released in that territory.

=== Non-charting singles ===
2021

- Quintino and Thomas Gold - "Quechua" (Spinnin' Records)
- Thomas Gold and Vivid featuring Nico Lucarelli - "Let Me In" (Fanfare Records)
- Thomas Gold, Danny Ores, and Starjack featuring Conrad Brookes - "Dream On" (Fanfare Records)
- Thomas Gold, Uplink, and Matluck - "Yesterday" (Protocol Recordings)
- Thomas Gold, Cuebrick, and Uplink - "Strange Flutes" (Fanfare Records)
- Thomas Gold, R3spawn, and David Shane - "Letting Go" (Protocol Recordings)

2020

- Thomas Gold and Kazden - "Rise Up" (Revealed Music)
- Thomas Gold and Auralize featuring Matthew Steeper - "Pretend" (Fanfare Records)
- Thomas Gold - "Got To Know" (Fanfare Records)
- Thomas Gold - "Live A Little Louder" (Protocol Recordings)
- Thomas Gold and Kosling featuring David Shane - "Escape" (Revealed Music)

2019:

- Thomas Gold featuring Emy Perez - "Ain't Seen Before" (Fanfare Records)
- Thomas Gold and Teamworx - "We Remember" (Protocol Recordings)
- Thomas Gold and Jac & Harri featuring Chad Kowal - "Without You" (Revealed Recordings)
- Thomas Gold featuring Eagle-Eye Cherry - "Get Up" (Fanfare Records)
- Thomas Gold - "Hangover" (Revealed Recordings)
- Thomas Gold and Raiden - "Someone New" (Protocol Recordings)
- Thomas Gold featuring Bright Sparks - "Seventeen" (Protocol Recordings)
- Thomas Gold and Angger Dimas - "Hi Lo" (Revealed Recordings)
- Thomas Gold and Kosling featuring Matthew Steeper - "Wildest Dreams" (Protocol Recordings)
- Thomas Gold featuring Sonofsteve - "Gold" (Armada Music)
- Thomas Gold - "Non-Stop" (Armada Trice)

2018:

- Thomas Gold featuring Graham Candy - "Real Love" (Armada Music)
- Thomas Gold and Corey James - "Orinoco" (Armada Music)
- Thomas Gold - "Begin Again" (Armada Music)
- Thomas Gold - "Take It Back (To The Oldschool)" (Armada Music)

2017:

- Thomas Gold - "Don't Stop (Creepin')" (Armada Music)
- Thomas Gold - "Tumbler" (Armada Music)
- Thomas Gold featuring Mimoza - "Dreamer" (Armada Music)
- Thomas Gold - "You Know" (Armada Music)
- Thomas Gold - "The Chant" (Armada Music)
- Thomas Gold - "Better Versions Of Myself" (Armada Music)

2016:

- Thomas Gold featuring Jillian Edwards - "Magic" (Armada Music)
- Thomas Gold featuring M.Bronx - "Saints & Sinners" (Armada Music)
- Thomas Gold and Rico & Miella - "On Fire" (Revealed Recordings)
- Thomas Gold and Amersy – "Can't Stop This Feeling" (Armada Music)

2015:

- Thomas Gold and Lush & Simon – "Morphine" (Armind Armada Music)
- Thomas Gold and Deniz Koyu – "Never Alone" (Protocol Recordings)
- Thomas Gold and Uberdrop – "Souq" (Armada Music)
- Thomas Gold featuring Bright Lights – "Believe" (Revealed Recordings)
- Thomas Gold, Hiio and Harrison – "Take Me Home" (Armada Music)

2014:

- Thomas Gold featuring Kate Elsworth – "Colourblind" (Revealed Recordings)
- Thomas Gold and Borgeous – "Beast" (Spinnin' Records)

2013:

- Thomas Gold featuring Kaelyn Behr – "Remember" (Axtone)
- Thomas Gold – "Sing2Me" (Axtone)

2012:

- Thomas Gold – "Miao" (Fly Eye)
- Thomas Gold – "The Beginning / Fanfare / Circles" [Included on Axtone Presents Thomas Gold]
- Dirty South and Thomas Gold featuring Kate Elsworth – "Eyes Wide Open" (Phazing)

2011:

- Dirty South and Thomas Gold featuring Kate Elsworth – "Alive" (Phazing)

2010:

- Thomas Gold – "Agora" (Size, 2010)
- David Tort, Thomas Gold and David Gausa – "Areena" (Phazing, 2010)
- Thomas Gold – "Marsch Marsch" (Toolroom, 2010)
- Thomas Gold and Alex Kenji – "What's Up" (Spinnin’, 2010)
- Fatboy Slim and Thomas Gold – "Star69" (Skint Rec, 2010)
- Thomas Gold – "Work That / Kananga" (Toolroom, 2010)
- Thomas Gold – "The Button" (Toolroom, 2010)

2009:

- Thomas Gold featuring Amanda Wilson – "Just Because" (Hed Kandi, MoS, PooleMusic, 2009)
- Thomas Gold – "In Your Face" (Nero 2009)
- Lee Cabrera and Thomas Gold featuring Tara McDonald – "Shake It (Move a Little Closer)" (CR2, 2009)
- Thomas Gold and Matthias Menck – "Everybody Be Somebody" (Incentive, Scorpio, MoS, 2009)
- Systematic and Thomas Gold – "Don't Tell" (Egoiste)

2008:

- Thomas Gold and Eric Smax featuring Inusa Dawuda – "Risin' Sun" (S2G Productions)
- Thomas Gold and Eddie Cabrera – "Losing My Religion" (Nero, MoS 2008)
- Thomas Gold featuring Amanda Wilson – "Something's Gotta Give" (S2G, 2008)
- Eric Smax, Thomas Gold and Niels Van Gogh Presents City Sneakerz featuring Michael Marshall – "Want 2 Be" (Selected Works)
- Thomas Gold and Montana Express – "To My Beat" (Haiti Groove, 2008)
- Eric Smax and Thomas Gold – "House Arrest" (Selected Works)
- Dim Chris and Thomas Gold – "Self Control" (Paradise Records)

2007:

- Gold, Díaz and Young Rebels – "Open Sesame" (Blanco Y Negro, Net's Work, Música Díaz, 2007)
- Wawa and Ortega and Gold – "No Problem 2007" (S2G, 2007)
- Björn Mandry and Thomas Gold – "Suppress You" (Flow Vinyl)
- Wawa and Thomas Gold – "Latin Thing" (Haiti Groove)
- Chriss Ortega and Thomas Gold featuring Nicole Tyler – "Miracle" (Houseworks)
- Gold, Díaz and Young Rebels – "Don't You Want Me" (Joia/Cyber, 2007)
- Gold, Smax and Gogh presents City Sneakerz – "You Don't Own Me" (Selected Works, 2007)
- Thomas Gold – "Rescue Me" (Houseworks, 2007)
- Chriss Ortega and Thomas Gold – "The Other Side" (Tumbata Records)

2006:

- Antolini and Moreno and Thomas Gold – "Don't Know Anybody" (Houseworks)
- Montana Express and Thomas Gold – "Don't Know" (Haiti Groove)
- Level K and Thomas Gold – "Animal Love" (VIP Recordings)
- Thomas Gold and Chriss Ortega featuring Tyler – "Hypnotized" (Houseworks)
- Eric Smax and Thomas Gold – "The Feeling / Crucified" (Selected Works)

2005:

- Chriss Ortega and Thomas Gold – "Lov" (Houseworks)
- Eric Smax and Thomas Gold – "S_Punk / Our Roots" (Vendetta Records)

== Remixes ==
2020
- Jarod Glawe - "Let Go" (Thomas Gold Remix)
- Danny Ores - "Fellas" (Thomas Gold Edit)
- Iamnotshane - "Perfect" (Thomas Gold Remix)
- Nipri, Josh Le Tissier and Zhiko - "Like Magic" (Thomas Gold Edit)
- C-Ro and Perttu - "Compass" (Thomas Gold Mix)
- The Avener featuring M.I.L.K. - "Under the Waterfall" (Thomas Gold Remix)

2019

- Danny Ores - "Ouch" (Thomas Gold Remix)
- Deniz Koyu - "Tung!" (Thomas Gold Remix)
- Madonna - "I Rise" (Thomas Gold Remix)
- John Lundvik - "Too Late for Love" (Thomas Gold Remix)
- Alice Chater - "Thief" (Thomas Gold Remix)
- Hardwell featuring Conor Maynard and Snoop Dogg - "How You Love Me" (Thomas Gold Remix)

2018:

- Nicky Romero and Stadiumx featuring Matluck - Rise (Thomas Gold Remix)
- Patrick Alavi - Goldbass (Thomas Gold Remix)

2017:

- Ria Mae - Bend (Thomas Gold Remix)
- Alex Adair - Casual (Thomas Gold Remix)
- Cazzette featuring Jones - Handful Of Gold (Thomas Gold Remix)
- New City - Dirty Secrets (Thomas Gold Remix)
- Borgore - Best (Thomas Gold Remix)
- Kato and Sigala featuring Hailee Steinfeld - Show You Love (Thomas Gold Remix)

2016:

- Vicetone featuring Cosmos & Creature - Bright Side (Thomas Gold Remix Edit)

2015:

- Borgeous featuring M.Bronx – Souls (Thomas Gold Remix)
- Dash Berlin featuring Jonathan Mendelsohn – World Falls Apart (Thomas Gold Remix)

2012:

- OneRepublic – Feel Again (Thomas Gold Club Mix)
- Otto Knows vs. Coldplay vs. OneRepublic – Apologize and Fix Your Million Voices (Thomas Gold Bootleg)
- Thomas Gold – AGORa (Thomas Gold 2012 Remix)
- Digitalism – Zdarlight (Thomas Gold Rework)
- Adrian Lux – Teenage Crime (Thomas Gold 2012 Rework)
- Miike Snow – The Wave (Thomas Gold Remix)

2011:

- Adele – Someone Like You (Thomas Gold & Mark Mendes Bootleg)
- Thomas Gold – Marsch Marsch (Thomas Gold 2011 Rework)
- Sander van Doorn – Reach Out (Thomas Gold Remix)
- Adele – Set Fire to the Rain (Thomas Gold Remix)
- Lady Gaga – Judas (Thomas Gold Remix)
- Jay C & Felix Baumgartner – Souk (Thomas Gold Remix)
- Hard Rock Sofa & St. Brothers – Blow Up (Thomas Gold vs. Axwell Remix)

2010:

- Akabu featuring Boom Clap Bachelors - You Want It All (Thomas Gold Remix)
- Moguai – We Want Your Soul (Thomas Gold Mix)
- Jes – Awaken (Thomas Gold Mix)
- Tomcraft – Loneliness (Thomas Gold Bootleg)
- Akabu – Another Generation (Thomas Gold Remix)
- David Tort & Norman Doray – Chase the Sun (Thomas Gold Remix)
- Dero and Robbie Rivera featuring Juan Magan – Oh Baby (Thomas Gold Mix)
- Static Revenger and Richard Vission featuring Luciana – I Like That (Thomas Gold Dub)
- David Guetta featuring Chris Willis, Fergie & LMFAO – Gettin' Over You (Thomas Gold Mix)
- Afrojack and Junior Jack – Esther vs. E Samba (Thomas Gold Mashup)
- Ich & Ich – Einer Von Zweien (Thomas Gold Mix)
- Schiller featuring Nadia Ali – Try (Thomas Gold Mix)
- Chris Kaye – Don't Give Up (Thomas Gold & Matthias Menck Mix)

2009:

- Undercover Lover – Who's Been Sleeping In My Bed?
- Erick Morillo vs. Richard Grey – Say The Word (Thomas Gold Mix)
- Pete Griffiths featuring Neve – Speak The Secret (Thomas Gold Mix)
- Huggy & Dean Newton featuring Sam Obernik – Get Lifted (Indian Summer) (Thomas Gold Mix)
- Fatboy Slim vs. Thomas Gold – Star 69 (Thomas Gold 09 'What The F..k Edit)
- Dero – Dero's Rave (Thomas Gold Rave Mix)
- Nari & Milani featuring Max C. – Let It Rain (Thomas Gold Mix)
- Philippe B & Romain Curtis – Like This (Thomas Gold & Ortega Mix)
- Antoine Clamaran – Reach For The Stars (Thomas Gold Mix)
- Tommy Vee & Mauro Ferrucci with Ce Ce Rogers – Stay
- Snap! – Do You See The Light (Thomas Gold Mix)
- Ian Carey – SOS (Thomas Gold Mix)
- The Rivera Project featuring Lizzie Curious – Sax Heaven
- Paul van Dyk – We Are Alive (Thomas Gold Mix)
- Carlos Russo – Massive Joy (Thomas Gold Remix)
- Alan Pride – In Heaven (Chris Ortega & Thomas Gold Rmx)
- Hott 22 – Wicked Games (Thomas Gold Mix)
- Platnum – Trippin (Thomas Gold Remix)
- Jay C – Multiply (Thomas Gold Mix)
- Clearcut – Breathless (Ortega & Gold Mix)
- Josh Jackson – Givin the World to You (Thomas Gold Mix)
- Alex Gaudino vs. Nari & Milani feat Carl – I'm a DJ (Thomas Gold Mix)

2008:

- Antoine Clamaran – Gold (Thomas Gold Mix)
- Recover Project – Sweet Dreams (Chris Ortega & Thomas Gold Remix)
- The Viron Ltd. featuring Max'C – Wanna Be Happy (Thomas Gold Remix)
- Delerium featuring Sarah McLachlan – Silence (NvG vs. Thomas Gold Mix)
- DB Boulevard – You're the One (Thomas Gold Mix)
- Reza – There Is Power (Thomas Gold Remix)
- Lexter – Peace & Love (Chriss Ortega & Thomas Gold Mix)
- Valeriya – Wild! (Ortega & Gold Remix)
- 2 Tyme featuring Jennifer Jones – Missing You (Thomas Gold Remix)
- Liquid Nation featuring Andrea Britton – Breathe Life (Ortega & Gold Mix)
- Kaz James featuring Stu Stone – Breathe (Thomas Gold Mix)
- Mario Ochoa – Amazing (Thomas Gold Mix)
- The Asteroids Galaxy Tour – The Sun Ain't Shining No More
- The All-American Rejects – The Wind Blows (Thomas Gold Mix)
- DJ Fist & Robinson Valentti – Reach (Thomas Gold Remix)
- Paul Emanuel, Gav McCall & Katherine Ellis – Gotta Get Through (Smax & Gold Mix)
- Sunloverz – Summer of Love (Ortega & Gold Remix)
- Karanyi featuring Judie Jay – Libido (Dave Ramone & Thomas Gold Mix)
- AnnaGrace – You Make Me Feel (Francesco Díaz & Thomas Gold Remix)
- Sunfreakz featuring Mia J – Drive Out (Francesco Díaz & Thomas Gold Mix)
- Christian George – Strangers (Thomas Gold Remix)
- C.Y.B. – Now (Thomas Gold Remix)
- Cahill featuring Nikki Belle – Trippin On You (Thomas Gold Remix)
- Laurent Wolf featuring Eric Carter – No Stress (Ortega & Gold Remix)
- Morgan Page – Call My Name (Thomas Gold Mix)
- DJ Antoine – Feel the Beat and Dance (Chriss Ortega & Thomas Gold Booty Mix)
- Stisch featuring Wayne Hussey – Hit Repeat (Thomas Gold Remix)
- Flash Republic – Star (Thomas Gold Mix)
- Mischa Daniëls – Run Away (Chriss Ortega & Thomas Gold Remix)
- Till West & Eddie Thoneick vs. Alexandra Prince – Hi 'n' Bye
  (Eric Smax & Thomas Gold Remix)
- Pate No.1 – Shining Star (Smax & Gold Remix)
- Soul Seekerz vs. Judy Cheeks – Reach for the Love (Smax & Gold)
- Leonid Rudenko Pres. Big Boss – A Song for Ya (Thomas Gold Mix)
- Thomas Penton & John C featuring Marcie – Sinners Kitchen
- Jim Tonique & Patrick Bryze – Better World (Thomas Gold Remix)

2007:

- Corinna Presi – What's Life (Thomas Gold Mix)
- Mark Brown featuring Sarah Cracknell – The Journey Continues
- H Two O featuring Platnum – What's It Gonna Be (Thomas Gold Remix)
- Jody Watley – I Want Your Love (Thomas Gold Remix)
- Dab Hands – Supergood (Thomas Gold Remix)
- Chriss Ortega featuring Chandler Pereira – Separated (Ortega & Gold Mix)
- George Acosta featuring Jeff Vylonis – Behind the Wheel (Ortega & Gold)
- Altar featuring Amannda – Sound of Your Voice (Thomas Gold Mix)
- Eric Smax – That's It (Thomas Gold Mix)
- Houzecrushers – Gonna Get You (Smax & Gold Mix)
- Alex Party – Read My Lips (Houzecrushers Mix aka Smax & Gold)
- Filo & Peri featuring Eric Lumiere – Anthem (Thomas Gold Mix)
- Jack Rokka vs. Betty Boo – Take Off (Smax & Gold Funky Sessions Mix)
- O&G Project featuring Evo – Bad Ass (Ortega & Gold Remix)
- Big Bass vs. Michelle Narine – What You Do (Playing With Stones)
- Noir – FM (Thomas Gold Mix)
- Sunburst – Beautiful Day (Smax & Gold Mix)
- Benny Maze featuring Drew Brody – Utopía (Ortega & Gold Remix)
- Peter Gelderblom – Waiting 4 (Thomas Gold Mix)
- The S&M Project – One Man (Thomas Gold Mix)
- Nick Jay – Pour It On (Thomas Gold Mix)
- Leisure Groove featuring Sevi G – Fallen Angel (Ortega & Gold Mix)
- Booty Luv – Don't Mess with My Man (Thomas Gold Disco Remix)
- Just Jack – Writer's Block (Thomas Gold Mix)
- Soundbluntz featuring Cheyne – (Maybe You'll Get) Lucky (Smax & Gold Mix)
- Soulshaker & Ce Ce Peniston – Shame Shame Shame (Eric Smax & Thomas Gold Remix)
- Topmodelz featuring Gary Wright – Heartbeat (Smax & Gold Remix)
- Degrees of Motion – Do You Want It Right Now (Smax & Gold Remix)
- Robbie Rivera featuring C & C Music Factory Music DJs – Aye Aye Aye (Ortega & Gold Remix)
- Arias – Twelve (Ortega & Gold Remix)
- George Morel vs. Chris Montana – Sex Girl (Thomas Gold Remix)
- Ghosts – Ghosts (Thomas Gold Remix)
- Freaks – The Creeps (Thomas Gold Mix)
- Benedetto & Farina Feat Akram – I Miss U (Thomas Gold Remix)
- Nicole Otero – Sunshine Song (Thomas Gold Mix)
- Hilary Duff – Stranger (Smax & Gold Club Mix)
- T2 featuring Jodie Aysha – Heartbroken (Thomas Gold Remix)
- Loveshy – AM to PM (Thomas Gold Remix)
- Buzz Junkies featuring Elesha – If You Love Me (Thomas Gold Remix)
- Jim Tonique & Patrick Bryze – Better World (Thomas Gold Mix)
- Wawa & Guy Williams – The Energy (Chriss Ortega & Thomas Gold Mix)
- BassMonkeys Feat Naomi Marsh – The Answer (Smax & Gold Remix)
- Taxi Doll – Waiting (Thomas Gold Remix)
- Lexter – Freedom to Love (Chriss Ortega & Thomas Gold Remix)
- Therese – Feelin' Me (Thomas Gold Remix)
- City Sneakerz – You Don't Own Me (Eric Smax & Thomas Gold Remix)
- Dan Marciano – Boy I Believe (Thomas Gold Mix)
- Client – Drive (Thomas Gold Mix)
- Two Tons of Fun – Feel It (Thomas Gold Remix)
- Soulmaniax – Sensuality (Ortega & Gold Remix)
- Hott 22 featuring Bonnie Bailey – No Promises (Thomas Gold Mix)
- Chris Kaeser featuring Linda Newman – Celebrate (Ortega & Gold Remix)
- Peak Time Killerz – Want You Back (WaWa & Thomas Gold Mix)
- Francesco Díaz featuring Bonny Ferrer – Life Is Too Short (Thomas Gold Mix)
- Sebastian Gnewkow – Disco Inferno (Thomas Gold Remix)
- R.I.O. – De Janeiro (Thomas Gold Remix)
- Atrium – In Love with You (Eric Smax & Thomas Gold Remix)

2006:

- Gabi Newman – Under Pressure (Chriss Ortega & Thomas Gold Remix)
- DJ Antoine vs. Mad Mark – Eskalation (Level K Remix)
- M-Factor – Open Your Eyes (Thomas Gold & Eric Smax Remix)
- Niels van Gogh vs. Eniac – Pulverturm 2.0 (Smax & Gold Mix)
- Houzecrushers – Touch Me (Eric Smax & Thomas Gold Remix)
- Cascada – Truly Madly Deeply (Thomas Gold Remix)
- Patrick Alavi, Basstard Slayerz – Goldbass (Thomas Gold Remix)
- Markus Binapfl aka Big World – Fuerza (Thomas Gold Much Better Mix)
- Strike – U Sure Do (Eric Smax & Thomas Gold Rmx)
- Reza – There Is Power (Thomas Gold Mix)
- VooDoo & Serano – Vulnerable (Thomas Gold Remix)
- Stonebridge – SOS (Ortega & Gold Mix)
- Ian Carey – Say What You Want (Smax+Gold Mix)
- Martijn Ten Velden – Bleep (Ortega & Gold Mix)
- Francesco Díaz vs. X-Static – I'm Standing (Thomas Gold Mix)
- Soul Seekerz – Party (For the Weekend) (Eric Smax & Thomas Gold Mix)
- Superfunk – Lucky Star (Eric Smax & Thomas Gold Ultraschall Rmx)
- Systematic – I Am An Addict (Thomas Gold Alternative Mix)
- Naomi Marsh – Now & Forever
- The Sharp Boys – Dancefloor (Eric Smax & Thomas Gold Remix)
- L1R featuring Zelina – I Don't Wanna Walk Away (Smax & Gold Mix)
- Club – Deep Inside (Eric Smax & Thomas Gold Remix)
- DJ Antoine vs. Mad Mark – Stand Up (Ortega & Gold Remix)
- Francesco Díaz & Young Rebels – Ibiza 2006 (Thomas Gold Mix)
- Sunkids featuring Chance – Rise Up (Thomas Gold Remix)
- Frank Savaro – No Stoppin' (Thomas Gold Punk Mix)
- DJ Antoine – Arabian Adventure 2 (Chriss Ortega & Thomas Gold Remix)

2005:

- Roger Sanchez featuring GTO – Turn On the Music (Ortega & Gold Remix)
- DJ Antoine vs. Mad Mark – Take Me Away (Ortega & Gold Mix)
- DJ Antoine vs. Mad Mark – Detonation (Thomas Gold Remix)
- Aaron Smith Feat Luvli – Dancin' (Eric Smax & Thomas Gold Remix)
- Openair featuring Gram'ma Funk – Hi Roller (Thomas Gold Remix)
- VooDoo & Serano – Don't You Know (Level K vs. VooDoo & Serano Mix)
- Chris Montana – Devil (Level K meets Chris Montana Mix)
- Morris T featuring Janie Romer – Reach for the Sun (Ortega & Gold Remix)
- Global Brothers vs. D-Luxe – Tell Me Why (Ortega & Gold Remix)
- Ramone featuring Nicole Tyler – I Love the Nightlife (Thomas Gold Punk Mix)

2004:

- Angel City – Do You Know (I Go Crazy) (Dee-Luxe Club Mix)
- Angel City – Touch Me (Dee-Luxe Club Mix)

2003:

- Despina Vandi – Gia (Level K Remix)
- Brighton Project – Satisfied (Level K Remix)
- Nalin & Kane – Beachball (Level K Remix)
- Deux – Sometimes (Level K Remix)

2001:

- Resource – (I Just) Died in Your Arms (Original Mix)
- DJ Dan – Needle Damage (Ortega & Gold Remix)

2000:

- The Ze-Factory DJs Pres. Azuca – Este Chico (I Fall In Love With You) (Frankk & Ramone Remix)
- Yellow Mellow – Touch By Touch (Frankk & Ramone Remix)
- Marc Maris vs. Alex Fuse – Es Vedra (Ramone & Frank Remix)
