= The Swaggernautz =

American songwriters

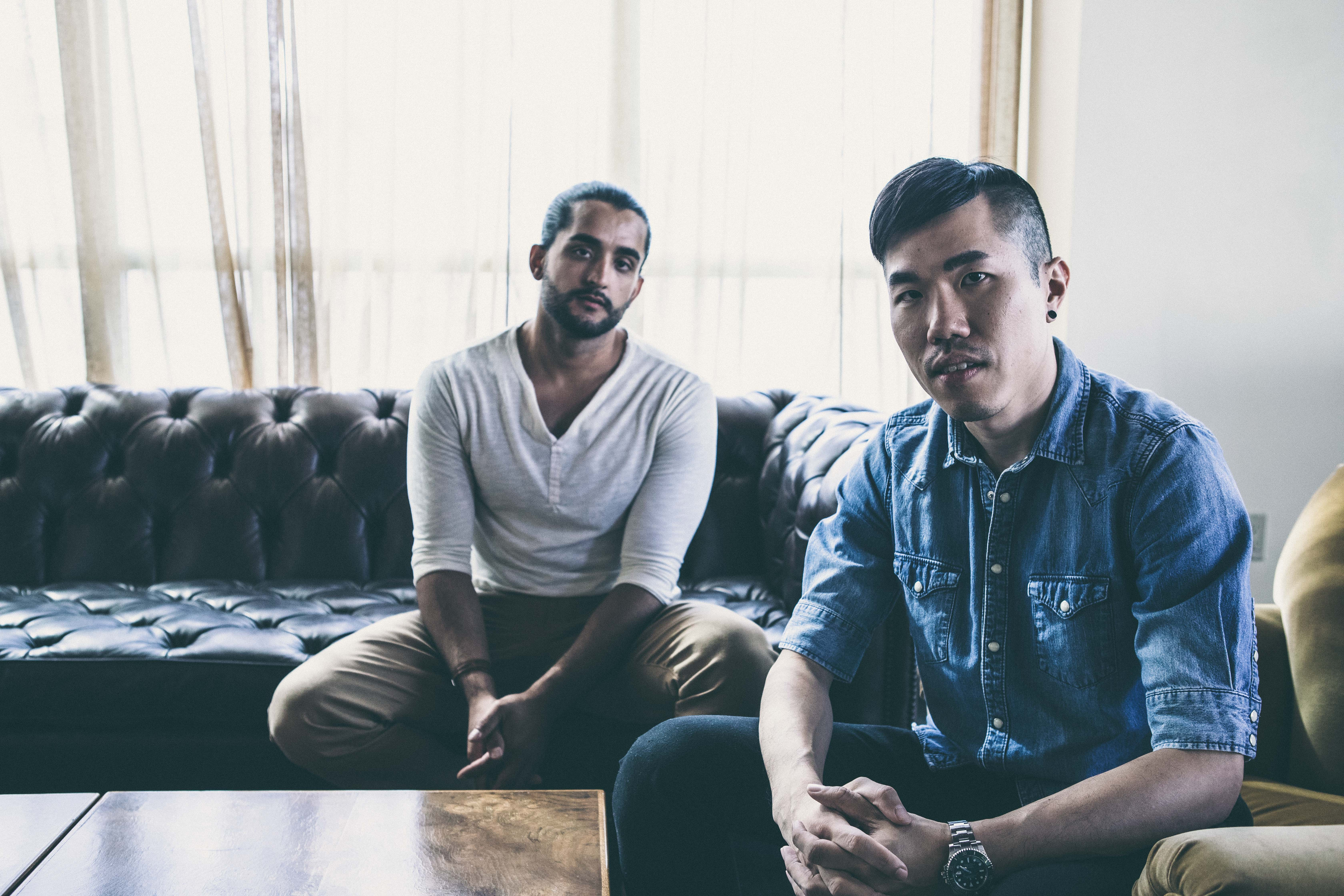
The Swaggernautz

The Swaggernautz is a songwriting and production duo based in Los Angeles, composed of Singaporean songwriter-producer Tat Tong and American Idol Season 10 alumnus Jovany Javier. Their combined discography has gone 60× platinum, with over 20 #1 hits out of over 60 Top 20 hits worldwide.

== Early life and history ==
As a child in Singapore, Tong studied piano and composition at Yamaha Music Foundation. In 2001, he accepted a scholarship from the Singapore Armed Forces to study Computer Science at Cornell University in Ithaca, NY, and following that, worked in the Republic of Singapore Navy for 6 years before transitioning to a full-time music career in 2011.

Growing up in Harvey, Louisiana, Javier worked as a shipbuilder before auditioning for American Idol Season 10 in 2011. After finishing in the Top 12 male finalists, he proceeded to perform at 27 military installations in 12 countries on an Armed Forces Entertainment World Tour, with stops including Japan, Korea, Guam, Australia, and Hawaii.

Tong and Javier started collaborating as The Swaggernautz in 2013.

== Current career ==
Since its inception, the duo has had releases with artists across North America, Central/South America, Europe, Asia, and Australia, including Luis Fonsi, Demi Lovato, Troye Sivan, Monsta X, Kaskade, CNCO, Sebastian Yatra, Juanes, CD9, Alvaro Soler, Aitana, ShiNEE, JJ Lin, Vanness Wu, and Wang Lee Hom.

In the Latin music space, they co-produced and co-wrote the Mandarin remix of "Despacito" by Luis Fonsi featuring JJ Lin. They also co-wrote "Apaga La Luz" from Fonsi's 2019 album "Vida" which was nominated for Best Latin Pop Album in the 62nd Grammy Awards, reached #1 on Billboard's US Top Latin Albums and US Latin Pop Albums, #18 on the Billboard 200, and was certified 22× platinum in the United States. They co-wrote and co-produced "Estoy Enamorado De Ti" from CNCO's self-titled 2018 album which reached #1 on Billboard's US Top Latin Albums, #33 on the Billboard 200, and was certified platinum in the United States.

Their US discography includes Troye Sivan's debut single "Happy Little Pill" from his 2014 TRXYE album and 2015 Blue Neighborhood album, which were certified Gold in Australia, Gold in the United States, charted at #1 on iTunes in 66 countries, and reached #5 on the Billboard 200 chart. They also co-wrote American DJ Elephante's single "Age Of Innocence" featuring Trouze and Damon Sharpe which charted at #18 on the Billboard Dance charts.

Besides producing and writing music, the duo also speaks at and cohosts the Gamechangers Music Seminar series, with events in the United States, Spain, and Singapore.

== Partial Discography ==
- Luis Fonsi, JJ Lin: "Despacito (Mandarin Remix)", Universal Music Latin Entertainment
- Luis Fonsi, Demi Lovato: "Échame La Culpa (Not On You Remix)", Universal Music Latin Entertainment
- Luis Fonsi: "Apaga La Luz", Universal Music Latin Entertainment
- Monsta X, Sebastian Yatra: "Magnetic", Universal Music Latin Entertainment
- Troye Sivan: "Happy Little Pill", Universal Music Latin Entertainment
- CNCO: "Estoy Enamorado De Ti", Sony Music Latin
- Juanes, Alvaro Soler: "Arte", Universal Music Latin Entertainment
- ShiNEE: "Tell Me Your Name", SM Entertainment
- JJ Lin: "Resurgence", Warner Music Taiwan
- JJ Lin: "Sanctuary", Warner Music Taiwan
- Vanness Wu: "Rang Wo Geng Ai Wo", Sony Music Taiwan
- Lee Hong-gi: "Kings For A Day", LOEN Entertainment
- CD9 feat. Crayon Pop: "Get Dumb", Sony Music Mexico
- CD9:"Deja Vu", "Guilty Pleasure" Sony Music Mexico
- Anahí feat. Gente De Zona: "Arena Y Sol", Universal Music Latin Entertainment
- Anahí feat. Julión Álvarez: "Eres", Universal Music Latin Entertainment
- Kaskade: "Come Play With Me", Arkade
- Elephante feat. Trouze and Damon Sharpe: "Age of Innocence", Armada Music
- Project 46: "Beautiful It Hurts", Ultra Records
- Trouze: "Intersection", "Splash", "Busy"
- Christina Grimmie: "Shrug"
