= Jovany Javier =

American singer-songwriter

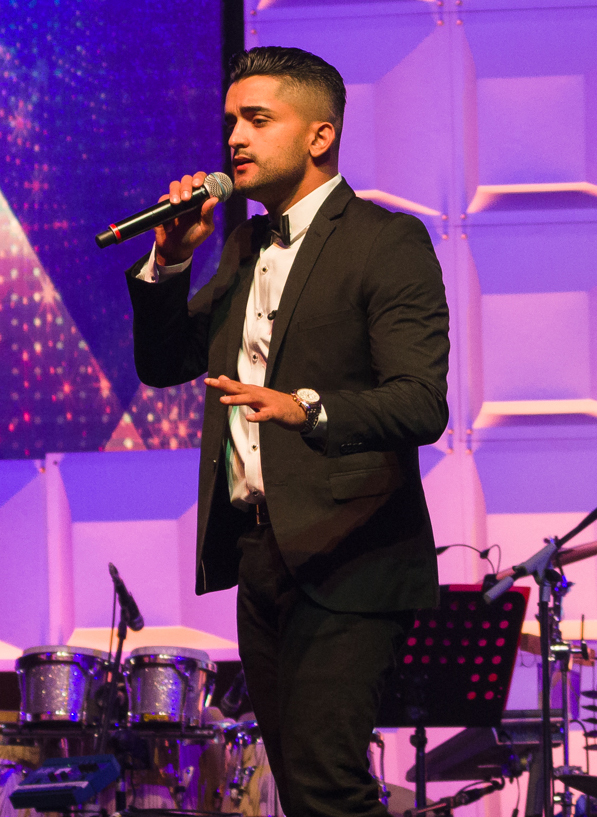
- Jovany Javier performing at the COMPASS Awards Presentation in Singapore, September 2016

Background information
- Born: Jovany Javier Barreto
- Origin: Harvey, Louisiana, U.S.
- Genres: Pop, rock, R&B, dance, Hip hop
- Occupations: Singer, songwriter, record producer

Jovany Javier Barreto (born September 3, 1987) is a Cuban-American record producer and singer-songwriter based in Los Angeles and Miami. He is a member of multi-platinum songwriter-producers The Swaggernautz, and previously part of the electronic music trio Trouze. He was also a Top 12 male finalist in American Idol Season 10.

== Early life and American Idol ==
Growing up in Harvey, Louisiana, Javier worked as a shipbuilder before auditioning for American Idol Season 10. He progressed to the Top 12 male finalists; although he did not receive enough votes to make the Top 13, he was chosen as one of six contestants to sing once more for a wildcard slot. However, he was not selected and thus eliminated as a semifinalist. Afterwards, he proceeded to perform at 27 military installations in 12 countries on an Armed Forces Entertainment World Tour, with stops including Japan, Korea, Guam, Australia, and Hawaii.

== Current career ==
In 2014, Jovany Javier was the featured vocalist on Santana's's "Oye 2014" alongside Pitbull and Ximena Munoz, which was released on the album Corazón. The album was nominated for a Latin Grammy Award for Contemporary Pop Vocal Album, charted at No. 1 on the iTunes album charts in 24 countries and Top 10 in 59 countries, and was certified U.S. Latin Double Platinum.

In the Latin music space, Javier co-produced and co-wrote the Mandarin remix of "Despacito" by Luis Fonsi featuring JJ Lin. He also co-wrote "Apaga La Luz" from Fonsi's 2019 album "Vida" which was nominated for Best Latin Pop Album in the 62nd Grammy Awards, reached #1 on Billboard's US Top Latin Albums and US Latin Pop Albums, #18 on the Billboard 200, and was certified 22× platinum in the United States. He co-wrote and co-produced "Estoy Enamorado De Ti" from CNCO's self-titled 2018 album which reached #1 on Billboard's US Top Latin Albums, #33 on the Billboard 200, and was certified platinum in the United States.

Javier co-produced and co-wrote CD9's 2016 albums "Evolution" and "Revolution" with Tat Tong of The Swaggernautz as well as Luis Salazar of The Dro1dz at EastWest Studios in Los Angeles. The albums were both certified platinum and charted at No. 1 in Mexico. He also cowrote and vocally performed on American DJ Elephante's single "Age Of Innocence" featuring Trouze and Damon Sharpe which charted in the Top 20 on the Billboard Dance charts.

Javier's global credits with The Swaggernautz and Trouze also include work with Project 46, Paul van Dyk, Vanness Wu, Coco Lee, JJ Lin, Kit Chan, and Paul Oakenfold. Apart from songwriting and production, Javier is a speaker and co-host of the Gamechangers Music Seminar series.

== Partial discography ==
- Luis Fonsi, JJ Lin: "Despacito (Mandarin Remix)", Universal Music Latin Entertainment
- Luis Fonsi, Demi Lovato: "Échame La Culpa (Not On You Remix)", Universal Music Latin Entertainment
- Luis Fonsi: "Apaga La Luz", Universal Music Latin Entertainment
- CNCO: "Estoy Enamorado De Ti", Sony Music Latin
- Juanes, Alvaro Soler: "Arte", Universal Music Latin Entertainment
- ShiNEE: "Tell Me Your Name", SM Entertainment
- JJ Lin: "Resurgence", Warner Music Taiwan
- JJ Lin: "Sanctuary", Warner Music Taiwan
- Kaskade: "Come Play With Me", Arkade
- Anahí feat. Gente De Zona: "Arena Y Sol", Universal Music Latin Entertainment
- Anahí feat. Julión Álvarez: "Eres", Universal Music Latin Entertainment
- CD9 feat. Crayon Pop: "Get Dumb", Sony Music Mexico
- CD9: "Deja Vu", "Guilty Pleasure", Sony Music Mexico
- Christina Grimmie: "Shrug"
- CNCO: "Estoy Enamorado de Ti", Sony Music Mexico
- Elephante feat. Trouze and Damon Sharpe: "Age of Innocence", Armada Music
- Project 46: "Beautiful It Hurts", Ultra Records
- Trouze: "Intersection", "Splash", "Busy"
- Lee Hong-gi: "Kings for a Day", LOEN Entertainment
