= Gattuso =

Gattuso is an Italian surname. Notable people with the surname include:

- Frank Vincent Gattuso Jr. (1937–2017), American actor and musician
- Gennaro Gattuso (born 1978), Italian football manager and former player
- Giacomo Gattuso (born 1968), Italian football manager and former player
- Greg Gattuso (born 1962), American football coach
- James Gattuso (1957–2020), American research fellow
- Jean-Pierre Gattuso (born 1958), French ocean scientist
- Josephine Gattuso Hendin (born 1944), Italian-American feminist novelist and critic
- Sébastien Gattuso (born 1971), Monegasque athlete
- Stefano Gattuso (born 1984), Italian racing driver
- Gattüso, Israeli electronic dance musician
