= Hurricane Relief: Come Together Now =

Compilation album by Various artists
- Released: November 22, 2005
- Recorded: 1947–2005
- Genres: Rock, pop, country, R&B, jazz, gospel, hip hop
- Length: 2:33:58
- Label: Universal Distribution

Singles from Libertad
- 1. "Tears In Heaven" Released: 2005

Professional ratings
Review scores
Source	Rating
Entertainment Weekly	(B)
Allmusic	3/5 stars

Hurricane Relief: Come Together Now is a 2005 two-disc compilation album produced to raise funds in aid of Gulf Coast residents affected by Hurricane Katrina and Hurricane Rita.

Three tracks were archival; the rest were recorded live in four sessions, over three months, in Camden, New Jersey, New York City, Arnhem and at the Red Rocks Amphitheatre.

Its Executive Producers were Gary Ashley, Tim Blixseth, Mark Feist, Jon Gass, Josh Henson, Hyman Katz, Kieron Kawall, Jay Landers, Floyd Lieberman, Andy McKaie, David Munk, Sanjay Rawal, Denise Eisenberg Rich, Damon Sharpe, Butch Spyridon, Sharon Stone and Barbra Streisand.

It was released by EMI, Sony BMG, Universal Music Group, Warner Music Group, Concord Music Group and the Recording Industry Association of America

All net proceeds from the sale of the CD were donated to, in equal parts, the American Red Cross, Habitat for Humanity and MusiCares Hurricane Relief 2005. As of 2025, the amount of money raised and/or donated as a result of the project is unknown.

== Tracks ==
Disc 1

1. "Do You Know What It Means To Miss New Orleans?" – 5:04 – Louis Armstrong
2. "Let Your Light Shine" – 4:26 – R. Kelly
3. "Precious Lord, Take My Hand" – 3:26 – Faith Hill
4. "Heart So Heavy" – 4:58 – John Mayer and Aaron Neville
5. "City Beneath The Sea" – 5:58 – Harry Connick Jr.
6. "Ay-TeTe Fee" – 1:53 – Clifton Chenier
7. "Moon Over Bourbon Street" (live) – 4:56 – Sting with special guest Chris Botti
8. "Heart of America" – 4:14 – Eric Benét, Michael McDonald, Wynonna Judd and Terry Dexter
9. "By Faith" – 4:39 – Diddy featuring Fred Hammond
10. "Early In The Morning" (80th Session Alternate Version) – 3:58 – B.B. King
11. "Fix You" (live) – 6:03 – Coldplay
12. "When The Levee Broke" – 5:43 – Clint Black
13. "Tears In Heaven" – 4:20 – Mary J. Blige, Andrea Bocelli, Phil Collins, Robert Downey Jr., Josh Groban, Elton John, Katie Melua, Kelly Osbourne, Ozzy Osbourne, Pink, Gavin Rossdale, Ringo Starr, Gwen Stefani, Rod Stewart, Steven Tyler, Velvet Revolver
14. "Believe" (Acoustic Summer 2004) – 4:30 – Lenny Kravitz
15. "Blue And Green" – 5:39 – Van Morrison
16. "Mardi Gras In New Orleans" – 2:51 – Professor Longhair
17. "Born On The Bayou" (live) – 4:17 – John Fogerty

Disc 2

1. "Any Other Day" – 4:14 – Norah Jones & Wyclef Jean
2. "I Will Not Be Broken" – 3:29 – Bonnie Raitt
3. "People Get Ready" – 2:38 – Rod Stewart with Jerry Lawson and Talk of the Town
4. "We Can Make It Better" – 3:48 – Kanye West featuring Talib Kweli, Q-Tip, Common, Rhymefest
5. "Try Me" (live) – 2:35 – James Brown
6. "Louisiana Bayou" (live 09.12.05) – 8:18 – Dave Matthews Band featuring Robert Randolph
7. "Goin’ Back To New Orleans" – 4:09 – Dr. John
8. "I'm Still Standing" (live, New Orleans April 2001) – 3:17 – Elton John
9. "What Would Jesus Do" – 4:05 – Chris Thomas King
10. "Alla Luce Del Sole" (live) – 5:47 – Josh Groban with Bela Fleck
11. "Make A Change" – 3:23 – Black Buddafly
12. "I Believe" – 3:24 – Barbra Streisand
13. "Love & Mercy" – 2:20 – Brian Wilson with Nelson Bragg
14. "Coming Out Of The Dark/Always Tomorrow" (acoustic) – 5:16 – Gloria Estefan
15. "Brothers" (live) – 5:26 – The Neville Brothers
16. "After All" (live in New Orleans) – 4:30 – The Winans family
17. "Come Together Now" – 4:35 – Aaron Carter, Nick Carter, Chingy, Natalie Cole, Gavin DeGraw, Celine Dion, The Game, Garou, Anthony Hamilton, R.L. Huggard, Wyclef Jean, JoJo, Patti LaBelle, John Legend, Glenn Lewis, Kimberley Locke, Jesse McCartney, Brian McKnight, AJ McLean, Mýa, Stacie Orrico, Kelly Price, Lee Ryan, Angie Stone, Joss Stone, Ruben Studdard, Tren'l
18. "When The Saints Go Marching In" – 4:53 – Kirk Whalum with special guest Coolio, CZ, Kyle Eastwood, Kyle Whalum, Rod McGaha & Wayman Tisdale

== Personnel ==
- Guitar: Bob Britt, Billy Burnette, Jonathan DuBose Jr., Davey Johnstone, Marco Linares, Colin Linden, Donnie Lyle, Steve Lukather, Foggy Lyttle, Tommy Maran, George Marinelli, Dominic Miller, Pino Palladino, Dean Parks, Brian Price, Michael Thompson, Phillip Walker, Dan Warner, Rick Williams. Banjo: Danny Barker
- Bass: David Barard, Scott Bennett, Pat Bergeson, Bob Birch, Sekou Bunch, Louis Candy, Sal Cuevas, Jerry Duplessis, Mark J. Feist, Tony Hall, George Hawkins, David Hayes, James Hutchinson, Dale Jones, Abraham Laboriel, Reggie McBride, Pino Palladino
- Keyboards: Walter Afanasieff, Guy Babylon, Eddie Baytos, Scott Bennett, Edwin Bonilla, Roy Byrd, Jon Cleary, Billy Kyle, Tony Coleman, Rodney East, Mark Feist, Kim Hanson, Rick Jackson, James K. Jones, Charlie Judge, Phil Madeira, Jimmy Nichols, Matt Nolen, Greg Phillinganes, Jason Rebello, Matt Rollings, Arturo Sandoval, Chris Stainton, Butch Taylor
- Drums: Liam Bradley, Nelson Bragg, Tony Braunagel, Mike Caputy, Ricky Fataar, Mark Feist, Steve Jordan, Manu Katché, Ricky Lawson, Al Miller, John Molo, Nigel Olsson, John Robinson, Wilton Siemen, Fred Staehle, Ian Thomas, Raymond Weber, John Woodrow
- Percussion: Edwin Bonilla, Lenny Castro, Ricardo Gaitán, John Mahon, Nigel Olsson, Chief Smiley Ricks, Alfred "Uganda" Roberts
- Brass: Roy Agee, Rashawn Ross, Jamil Sharif
- Cello: Rubin Kodheli
- Woodwinds: Pete Fountain, Robert Parker, Jimmy Reed, Eric Traub
- Harmonica: Pat Bergeson
- Backing Vocals: Lorraine Barnes, Bekka Bramlett, Marsha Johns, Mandy Lecolnte, Ann McCreary, Regina McCreary, Taylor Mills, Steve Real, Damon Sharpe, Ken Stacey, Lena Starks, Samantha Swaby, Crystal Taliefero, DeWayne Whitehead, William Winchester
- Choir: Akua Aidou, Terri B. Britton, Michael Brown, Natalie Brown, Latash Renee Dorsey, Rod Lumpkin, Megan McClannan, Jasmine Ross, Ted Winn
