= City Beneath the Sea =

City Beneath the Sea may refer to:

- "City Beneath the Sea" (song), a song by Harry Connick, Jr.
- City Beneath the Sea (1953 film), a 1953 American adventure film
- City Beneath the Sea (1971 film), a 1971 American science fiction television film
- City Beneath the Sea (TV series), a British television series

See also:

- The City Under the Sea, a.k.a. War-Gods of the Deep, 1965 film with Vincent Price
