= Heart of America (song) =

Heart of America is a charity single written by Tim Blixseth, Edra Blixseth and "two music-industry professionals". The song became the anthem for the Today TV show's "Make a Difference" campaign to benefit the victims of 2005's Hurricane Katrina. In 2005 Tim Blixseth appeared on the show to talk about the song, which was inspired by a dream. The song was recorded by Wynonna Judd, Michael McDonald, Terry Dexter and Eric Benét. It was played on NBC as part of a Habitat for Humanity campaign and was included on the 2005 compilation album Hurricane Relief: Come Together Now.

In June 2006, Ebony magazine reported the song had raised $41 million with projected revenues of $100 million. In August 2006 The Desert Sun reported the song had generated $127 million in revenues for hurricane-relief charities. All of the revenues from the song were for the benefit of Habitat for Humanity, Music Cares and the American Red Cross.
