= Trouze =

Singaporean-American electronic music trio

- Origin: United States, Singapore
- Genres: Electro House, Melodic House
- Instruments: Keyboard, Guitar, Vocals, Turntable
- Years active: 2015-present
- Labels: Armada Music, Axtone Records, Mixmash Records, Seed Music
- Members: Declan Ee, Jovany Javier, Tat Tong
- Website: www.trouze.com

Trouze is a Singaporean-American electronic music trio consisting of Declan Ee, Jovany Javier and Tat Tong.

The group had a Billboard Dance Top 20 hit in 2016 with the song "Age of Innocence" with Elephante and Damon Sharpe.

== Biography ==
The idea for Trouze came about in 2014 when the trio first met at a Zedd showcase in Miami and connected artistically over their different musical backgrounds. Based across Singapore and Los Angeles, members of Trouze had very different careers before dance music. Trouze's music draws influences from the group members’ varying cultural and geographical influences.

In 2016, Trouze featured on "Age of Innocence" with Elephante and Damon Sharpe, a release on Armada Music that they wrote and provided vocals for. The track peaked at #18 on the Billboard Dance charts and featured remixes by Hellberg, Jenaux and Crankdat. In late 2016, they released their first standalone single "Intersection". They also released "Who Am I" a collaboration with Jonathan Wong in Asia and premiered it with a performance at the Compass Awards. This cross-over track features lyrics in both English and Mandarin and is Jovany's first time singing in Mandarin. "Who Am I" reached #2 on the TVB music charts in Hong Kong. In December 2016, they released the remixes to "Intersection" featuring remixes by Gazzo, Project 46 and Kodrin. The track has been featured by Sam Feldt and Quintino (DJ). They also closed out the year collaborating with Jonathan Wong again, releasing a dance mash-up, "心电图2016/Electrogram 2016" featuring 30 of the biggest chinese hits that year. The song reached #1 in Hong Kong on the TVB charts in January 2017.

Trouze started 2017 with the release of 2 singles, "Splash" and "Busy", with their first featured vocalist, Kayrae. The track has since been featured by Lost Frequencies, Quintino (DJ), and Wee-O, and also on Spotify's Fresh Electronic, dancePOP and Friday Cratediggers playlists. In summer 2017, they were featured on "Waterfall", by Krosses & Heart FX and it has been played by Hardwell, Laidback Luke, Swanky Tunes and Juicy M.

Declan studied law at University College London before going into investment banking, is now also co-founder of furniture start-up Castlery. Jovany, a Cuban-American was a finalist on season 10 of American Idol and now a songwriter/producer with Tat as The Swaggernautz. Tat studied computer science at Cornell University and was a navy officer in Singapore before going into music full-time.

As songwriters and producers, they have produced 17 platinum records and over 50 Top 20 hits globally. Together, they have worked with many international artists across major territories including Troye Sivan, Santana, Pitbull, CD9, Project 46, 3Ball MTY, Wang Leehom, Paul van Dyk, Vanness Wu, Coco Lee, JJ Lin, Kit Chan and Paul Oakenfold.

== Discography ==
=== Singles ===
Year	Title	Artist(s)
2016	"Age of Innocence"	Elephante, Trouze, Damon Sharpe
2016	"Intersection"	Trouze
2016	"Who Am I / 我是谁"	Trouze x Jonathan Wong
2016	"Intersection" (Remixes)	Trouze
2016	"心电图2016/Electrogram 2016"	Trouze x Jonathan Wong
2017	"Splash"	Trouze
2017	"Busy"	Trouze feat. Kayrae
2017	"Waterfall"	Krosses, Heart FX, Trouze
2017	"Canyons - Trouze Remix"	Rozes (musician), Trouze
2017	"Like You"	Trouze
2017	"In The Air"	Trouze feat. T-Pain
2017	"The Way"	Shapov & Trouze
2018	"The Way Remixes"	Shapov & Trouze
2018	"Like You - Mandarin Version"	Trouze & Derrick Hoh
2018	"Qing Fei De Yi" (情非得已）	Sam Feldt x Trouze feat. Derrick Hoh
2018	"Every Breath You Take"	Trouze
2018	"These Streets"	Trouze feat. Brandyn Burnette
