= Come Together Now =

Single by Artists for Hurricane Relief

from the album Hurricane Relief: Come Together Now
- Released: November 21, 2005
- Genre: Pop; R&B
- Length: 4:37
- Label: Columbia; Epic
- Songwriter(s): Damon Sharpe; Denise Rich; Sharon Stone; Mark J. Feist
- Producer(s): Mark J. Feist; Damon Sharpe

"Come Together Now" is a charity single made to benefit the victims of the 2004 Indian Ocean earthquake and Hurricane Katrina in 2005. The song was written by Sharon Stone, Damon Sharpe, Mark Feist, and Denise Rich and released on November 21, 2005.

== Song information ==
The song's origin was an inspiration by the magnitude of human suffering and tragedy that touched so many lives after the tsunami disaster in December 2004. In Hurricane Katrina's wake Stone, Sharpe, Feist, and Rich used the song as a combined effort to raise funds for the two global tragedies. Feist and Sharpe also served as producers. Mark Feist also wrote the musical arrangement.

== Performers ==
The line-up of artists includes:

- Céline Dion
- The Game
- JoJo
- Jesse McCartney
- Nick Carter (Backstreet Boys)
- AJ McLean (Backstreet Boys)
- John Legend
- Joss Stone
- Mýa
- Gavin DeGraw
- Chingy
- Wyclef Jean
- Ruben Studdard
- Stacie Orrico
- Kimberley Locke
- Anthony Hamilton
- Patti LaBelle
- Natalie Cole
- Aaron Carter
- Brian McKnight
- Kelly Price
- Angie Stone
- Garou
- Tren'l
- Glenn Lewis
- Lee Ryan (Blue)
- R.L. Huggard

The following musicians played on the song:

- Mark Feist – keyboards, drums, Moog bass, synth programming
- Steve Lukather – guitar
- Abe Laboriel, Jr. – drums
- Greg Phillinganes – acoustic grand piano

Strings were arranged and conducted by Bill Meyers. Jon Gass served as engineer.

== Track listings and formats ==
Digital download

1. "Come Together Now" – 4:37

U.S. CD single

1. "Come Together Now" (Main) – 4:37
2. "Come Together Now" (No Rap) – 4:40
3. "Come Together Now" (Video) – 4:37

== Charts ==
Chart (2005)	Peak position
US Hot Singles Sales	13
US Adult Contemporary	39

== Legacy ==
Over four years after the song was released, numerous contemporary Christian singers collaborated to compose a similar song with the same title to support the victims of the 2010 Haiti earthquake.
