= Shapov =

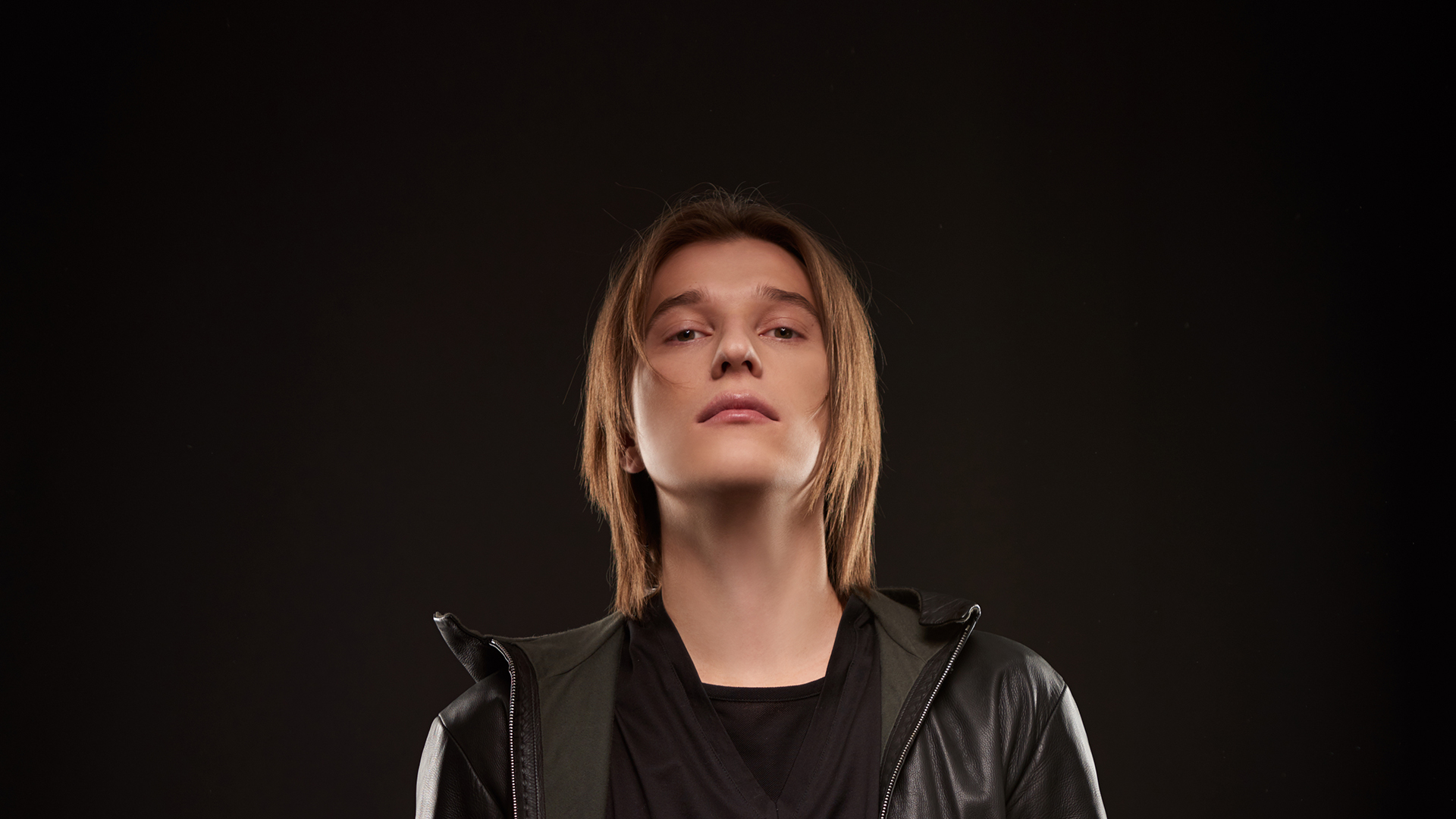

Background information
- Born: Alexander Shapovalov; 28 January 1989 (age 37)
- Origin: Smolensk, Russia
- Genres: EDM; progressive house; electro house; trance
- Occupations: DJ, music producer
- Years active: 2005 – present
- Labels: Axtone, Def Jam, Ultra, Armind, Armada
- Formerly of: Hard Rock Sofa
- Website: shapovmusic.com

Alexander Shapovalov (Russian: Александр Шаповалов, Aleksandr Shapovalov; born 28 January 1989, in Smolensk), better known by his stage name Shapov, is a Russian record producer and DJ. He is also a former member of the electronic project Hard Rock Sofa, and in his solo career has most notably collaborated with Axwell and Armin van Buuren.

== Biography ==
=== Hard Rock Sofa ===
Alexander was interested in music from a young age and began experimenting with production when he was 16 years old. In 2005, he and another DJ and producer Denis Chepikov joined together to form the music project Hard Rock Sofa.

=== Shapov ===
In 2015, Alexander left Hard Rock Sofa and began his solo career under the stage name Shapov. In the same year he joined the British label Axtone Records, which was founded by Swedish House Mafia member Axwell. On 23 February 2015, Shapov released an extended play on Axtone titled “Shapov EP”. On 5 October 2015, he released a second EP titled “Everybody”, with both songs on the EP being collaborations with duo Meg & Nerak.

A month later, Shapov released the track “Our World” featuring American singer and songwriter Justin Tranter. This composition was included in the anniversary album Axtone Ten, which celebrated a decade since Axtone's formation. At the end of 2015, he was named as a "Breakthrough Artist of the Year" in the EDM category by Beatport. Early in 2016, Shapov released the song "Future Rave", which he debuted in a guest mix he recorded for the Diplo & Friends show on BBC Radio 1.

In 2017, Shapov released a third EP titled "Four Corners", consisting of four tracks across both Axtone and Armada Music. Among the songs released on this EP were “Breathing Deeper”, which was another collaboration with duo Meg & Nerak, and “Some People”, which was written with Russian electronic group Beverly Pills. The next project in his career was the release of “The Way" together with the trio Trouze.

In 2018 Shapov collaborated with Dutch trance DJ Armin van Buuren to release The Last Dancer, accompanied by van Buuren inviting Shapov up to play their track together during van Buuren's mainstage set at Ultra Music Festival in Miami. Shortly afterwards, the pair released a new collaboration called “Our Origin”, which van Buuren played to open his set at Tomorrowland that year. “Our Origin” was also used in the Tomorrowland 2018 festival aftermovie.

Near the end of 2019, a collaboration with Magnificence titled "Unboring the Future" released and was subsequently used in the promotional presentation video for the new generation of the Peugeot 208. In 2020, Shapov continued to experiment across genres such as psy-trance, leading to a collaboration with Vini Vici and Nervo for a song titled 'My World'.

Tracks by Shapov under both his time in Hard Rock Sofa and his solo ventures have been featured in Hollywood movies and TV shows, such as Fast & Furious 6, The Lego Batman Movie, and Netflix series such as Quicksand, Werewolf, and The Last Days of American Crime.

== Discography ==
=== Extended plays ===
Title	Details	Tracklist
Shapov	Released: 23 February 2015; Label: Axtone; Formats: Digital download	1. Party People (with Meg & Nerak); 2. Disco Tufli
Everybody	Released: 5 October 2015; Label: Axtone; Formats: Digital download	1. Everybody (with Meg & Nerak); 2. Dream About It (with Meg & Nerak)
Four Corners	Released: 10 February 2017; Label: Axtone, Armada; Formats: Digital download	1. Breathing Deeper (with Meg & Nerak); 2. Some People (with Beverly Pills); 3. More Than Love (with Rookies); 4. Analogue Soul
Trilogy	Released: 12 April 2019; Label: Armada, Armind; Formats: Digital download	1. La Résistance de L'Amour (with Armin van Buuren); 2. The Last Dancer (with Armin van Buuren); 3. Our Origin (with Armin van Buuren)
Circles	Released: 27 August 2021; Label: Armada; Formats: Digital download	1. Vetra (with Nerak); 2. Heaven (with Nerak); 3. Illusion (with Nerak)
New Dimensions	Released: 11 February 2022; Label: Armada; Formats: Digital download	1. Resolution (with Sam Bagira); 2. Dark in the Light (with Nerak); 3. Cornerstone; 4. Inside the Rave

=== Singles and collaborations ===
Year	Title	Artist	Label
2015	Vavilon	Shapov, Amersy	Axtone
2015	Runic	Shapov	Axtone
2015	Our World	Shapov, Justin Tranter	Axtone
2016	Future Rave	Shapov	Axtone
2016	Belong	Shapov, Axwell	Axtone, Ultra
2016	Beats Do Work	Shapov	Monomark
2017	The Way	Shapov, Trouze	Axtone
2018	Alternate	Shapov, Sam Bagira	Axtone
2018	The Last Dancer	Shapov, Armin van Buuren	Armind
2018	Our Origin	Shapov, Armin van Buuren	Armind
2020	My World	Shapov, Vini Vici, Nervo	Alteza
2020	Chasing Shadows	Shapov, Cal	Armada
2021	Inside The Rave	Shapov	Armada
2021	Heaven	Shapov, Nerak	Armada, Armind
2021	Illusion	Shapov, Nerak	Armada, Armind
2021	Light up the World	Shapov, Avian Grays, KiFi	Armada
2021	Cornerstone	Shapov	Armada
2021	Dark in the Light	Shapov and Nerak	Armada

=== Remixes ===
Year	Title	Original artist(s)	Label
2015	Paradigm (Shapov Remix)	CamelPhat, A*M*E	Axtone
2015	SummerThing! (Shapov vs M.E.G. & N.E.R.A.K. Remix)	Afrojack, Mike Taylor	Def Jam
2016	Don't Threaten Me With A Good Time (Shapov Remix)	Panic! At the Disco	Free download
2017	We Are Stars (Shapov Remix)	Callum Beattie	3 Beat
