= Gattüso =

20th and 21st-century American disc jockey

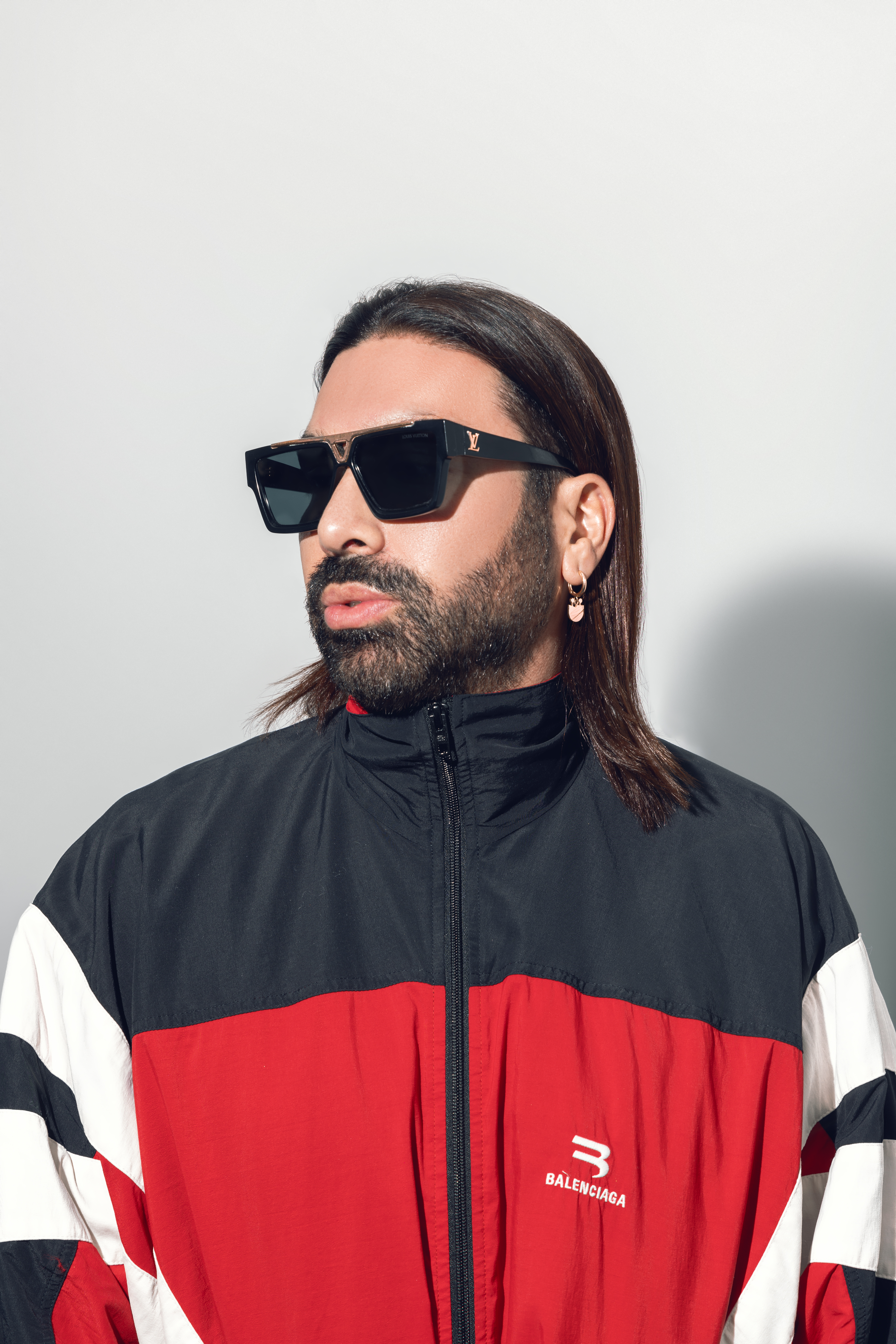

Background information
- Born: Reem Taoz; Tel Aviv, Israel
- Occupations: DJ; remixer
- Years active: 2018–present
- Labels: Ultra Records, Armada Music, Enhanced Music
- Website: gattusomusic.com

Reem Taoz, known professionally as Gattüso,(stylized in all caps) is an Israeli disc jockey (DJ), and EDM musician from Tel Aviv who is active in New York City. He has appeared on the Billboard Dance Radio chart three times, and has over 2 million monthly listeners on Spotify.

== Career ==
Gattüso's first official release was in 2018 with the song "Who We Are." In 2019, he signed an exclusive record contract with Ultra Music. In March 2020, Gattüso and R3hab released a cover of Radiohead's song "Creep" which was featured as the first of Spotify's 'Mint Singles' series. The track went on to be featured in 40 New Music Fridays around the world and received 10 million plays in its first month. In August 2020, he released "Cruel" which received heavy rotation on Fun Radio France.

In 2019, Gattüso wrote and dedicated a song to the former Italian football player and AC Milan manager Gennaro Gattuso. The song titled “Scusa Gattuso” became a viral sensation and charted in Italy.

In 2021, Gattüso released "Leave the World Behind" in collaboration with DVBBS. The song debuted on over 30 Spotify New Music Fridays across the world. In summer of 2021, Gattüso teamed up with Steve Aoki and Aukoustics to reimagine the R.E.M. song "Losing My Religion." Aoki Later joined him (alongside artist Cash Cash) on several dates of his Push The Reds tour later that summer.

In 2022, Gattüso collaborated with Dutch DJ Nicky Romero on their track "Afterglow" which released on Romero's label Protocol Recordings. In the same year, Gattüso performed on the main stages of Escapade Music Festival, Chasing Summer Festival, and Electric Zoo.

== Discography ==
Original Songs
| Title | Year Released | Billboard Chart Position | Song details | Label |
|---|---|---|---|---|
| "I Will Play" | 2018 | – | | T&T Records |
| "Easy Boy" | 2018 | – | collaboration with Liquid Todd | T&T Records |
| "Dance Stay High (feat. Lorensa)" | 2018 | – | | T&T Records |
| "Who We Are? (feat. xoxomyah)" | 2018 | – | | T&T Records |
| "Who We Are the Remix" | 2018 | – | | T&T Records |
| "When In Rome " | 2019 | 13 | collaboration with Damon Sharpe | Armada |
| "When In Rome (Remixes)" | 2019 | 13 | collaboration with Damon Sharpe | Armada |
| "Million Things" | 2019 | 9 | collaboration with Disco Killerz | Enhanced |
| "Million Things (Remixes)" | 2019 | 9 | collaboration with Disco Killerz | Enhanced |
| "Love is Not Enough feat. Salem Ilese" | 2019 | – | | T&T Records |
| "Before You Go" | 2019 | – | collaboration with RmZ | Future House Music |
| "I Will Play (VIP Remix)" | 2019 | – | | T&T Records |
| "Scussa Gattuso" | 2019 | – | collaboration with Sasha El Ras and Anna Guilia Staiano | T&T Records |
| "Creep" | 2020 | – | collaboration with R3HAB | CYB3RPVNK |
| "Creep (R3HAB Chill Mix)" | 2020 | – | | CYB3RPVNK |
| "Bring That Back (feat. Nadia Gattas)" | 2020 | – | collaboration with Asketa & Natan Chaim | Ultra |
| "I'll Be the One" | 2020 | – | collaboration with Disco Killerz | Enhanced |
| "I'll Be the One (Remixes)" | 2020 | – | collaboration with Disco Killerz | Enhanced |
| "Walk on Water feat. Kat Nestel" | 2020 | 25 | | Ultra |
| "Walk on Water feat. Kat Nestel [Dash Berlin Remix]" | 2020 | 25 | | Ultra |
| "Sorenious Bonk - Life (feat. Signe Mansdotter)" | 2020 | – | | Ultra |
| "Heart On My Sleeve feat. Sarah Reeves" | 2020 | – | collaboration with Laidback Luke | Ultra |
| "Cruel" | 2020 | – | collaboration with Love Harder; peaked at #1 on Fun Radio France | Ultra |
| "Haunted House " | 2020 | – | collaboration with Skazi | Ultra |
| "Never Alone" | 2021 | – | collaboration with Laidback Luke | Mixmash Records |
| "Back to Paris" | 2021 | – | | Ultra |
| "Bad Decisions" | 2021 | – | | Ultra |
| "Losing My Religion (feat. MKLA)" | 2021 | – | | Ultra |
| "Leave the World Behind (feat. Alida)" | 2021 | – | | Ultra |
| "Somebody" | 2021 | – | | Ultra |
| "Save Me (feat. Violet Days)" | 2021 | – | | Ultra |
| "Drop the 5th" | 2021 | – | | Ultra |
| "Born To Love" | 2022 | – | | Ultra Records |
| "Somebody Like You feat. KZ Tandigan (Acoustic)" | 2022 | – | Collaboration with Frongmonster | Liquid State |
| "Somebody Like You feat. KZ Tandigan" | 2022 | – | Collaboration with Frongmonster | Liquid State |
| "Afterglow feat. Jared Lee" | 2022 | – | Collaboration with Nicky Romero | Protocol Recordings |

Remixes
| Title | Year Released | Label |
|---|---|---|
| Disco Fries - "Moving Mountains (feat Ollie Green) [GATTÜSO Remix]" | 2019 | Enhanced |
| Breathe Carolina, Asketa & Natan Chaim - "Get Away (feat Rama Duke) [GATTÜSO Remix]" | 2019 | Spinnin' |
| Disco Fries - "Moving Mountains (feat Ollie Green) [GATTÜSO Remix]" | 2019 | Enhanced |
| Disco Killerz - "Beautiful Life (feat Delaney Jane & Sarah Charness) [GATTÜSO Remix]" | 2019 | Enhanced |
| DLMT - "Younger (feat Kopa) [GATTÜSO Remix]" | 2019 | Enhanced |
| for KING & COUNTRY - "God Only [GATTÜSO Remix]" | 2019 | Curb |
| Galantis, Yellow Claw - "We Can Get High [GATTÜSO Remix]" | 2019 | Atlantic |
| Mark Sixma - "Million Miles [GATTÜSO Remix]" | 2019 | Armada |
| R3HAB, Mike Williams - "Lullaby [GATTÜSO Remix]" | 2019 | CYB3RPVNK |
| Sam Feldt - "Post Malone (feat Rani) [GATTÜSO Remix]" | 2019 | Spinnin' |
| Starley - "Lovers + Strangers [GATTÜSO Remix]" | 2019 | Central Station |
| Steve Void, Louisa - "Ain't Got You [GATTÜSO Remix]" | 2019 | Strange Fruits |
| Tritonal - "Little Bit Of Love (feat. Rachel Platten) [GATTÜSO Remix]" | 2019 | Enhanced |
| Two Friends - "Dollar Menu (feat. Dani Poppitt) [GATTÜSO Remix]" | 2019 | Dim Mak |
| VAVO - "Right Now (feat. Caroline Kole) [GATTÜSO Remix]" | 2019 | KESS |
| R3HAB, Zayn, Jungleboi - "Flames [GATTÜSO Remix]" | 2020 | CYB3RPVNK/RCA |
| Steve Aoki, Sting, SHAED - "2 in a Million [GATTÜSO Remix]" | 2020 | Ultra |
| Steve Aoki, Ummet Ozcan, Dzeko - "Popcorn [GATTÜSO Remix]" | 2020 | Ultra |
| Tungevaag, Rat City - "Afterparty (feat. Rich The Kid) [GATTÜSO Remix]" | 2020 | Spinnin' |
| Nikki Vanna - "Mambo [GATTÜSO Remix]" | 2020 | Atlantic |
| Petey Martin - "Come Back Home (feat Lauren Daigle) [GATTÜSO Remix]" | 2020 | Atlantic |
| Laidback Luke - "Dance it Off (feat Ally Brooke) [GATTÜSO Remix]" | 2021 | Mixmash |
| "I Don't Need a Drug" | 2022 | Ultra |
| Sigma, "Can't Get Enough (feat. Taet [GATTÜSO Remix])" | 2022 | 3beat |
