= Hard Rock Sofa =

Russian musical duo

- Origin: Smolensk, Russia
- Genres: Progressive house, electro house, deep house, tech house
- Years active: 2005–present
- Labels: Axtone Records, Size Records, Wall Recordings, Spinnin' Records, Doorn Records, CR2 Records, Mixmash, BugEyed Records, Fly Eye Records
- Members: Denis Chepikov
- Past members: Sergey Zuev; Alexander Shapovalov (Shapov)
- Website: hardrocksofa.com

Hard Rock Sofa is a Russian electronic dance music duo formed in Smolensk in 2005. Composed of Alexander Shapovalov and Denis Chepikov, they were signed by popular EDM labels like Axwell's Axtone Records and Steve Angello's Size Records. Prior to 2012, they collaborated closely with another Russian EDM trio, Swanky Tunes. Their career was suspended in December 2014, when shortly later Alexander Shapovalov started a solo career under the stage name Shapov.

== Career ==
Hard Rock Sofa formed as a trio in 2005 between Alexander Shapovalov, Denis Chepikov, and Sergey Zuev (the latter left the band in late 2012). Their breakthrough success came in the form of their collaboration with St. Brothers for the single "Blow Up" on Axtone Records. "Blow Up" was accompanied with remixes by Axwell, Thomas Gold, Hook N Sling, and Goodwill. It peaked at number two in the Beatport Top 100 and was supported by all members of Swedish House Mafia. In 2011 they released "I Wanna Be Your Dog" alongside Swanky Tunes which sampled The Stooges' well known 1969 Garage Rock song by the same title. Since 2011 they've released numerous singles and remixes, most notably on Size Records, Spinnin' Records, Refune Records, and Protocol Recordings. In 2012 their remix of David Guetta's track "Just One Last Time" peaked at number one in the Beatport Top 100 where it held the position for five days. In 2013 their track, with Swanky Tunes, "Here We Go" was featured in the action film, Fast & Furious 6. Additionally they have announced they are in the process of finishing their debut album, due to be released on Axtone Records.

== Discography ==
=== Charting singles ===
Title	Year	Peak chart positions		Album
Title	Year	BEL (Vl)	BEL (Wa)	Album
"Here We Go" (with Swanky Tunes)	2012	BU20^{[A]}	―	Non-album singles
"Just Can't Stay Away" (with Squire featuring Max C)	2012	49^{[B]}	—	Non-album singles
"Get Down" (with Eva Shaw)^{[C]}	2014	BU17^{[A]}	BU7^{[A]}	Non-album singles
"Arms Around Me" (with Skidka)	2014	BU11^{[A]}	—	Non-album singles
"—" denotes a recording that did not chart or was not released in that territory.

=== Singles and Extended plays ===
- 2007 : "Roll"
- 2008 : "Overcomer"
- 2009 : "Let Me Go"
- 2009 : "Barely Holding On"
- 2010 : "Live Today"
- 2010 : "Myth" (with St. Brothers)
- 2010 : "Rhea" (with Swanky Tunes)
- 2010 : "Immersing / Acid Trip" (with Swanky Tunes)
- 2011 : "Thank You / Labyrinth" (with Swanky Tunes)
- 2011 : "Blow Up" (with St. Brothers) (incl. Thomas Gold vs. Axwell Remix)
- 2011 : "Feedback" (with Swanky Tunes)
- 2011 : "Steam Gun" (with Swanky Tunes)
- 2011 : "Smolengrad / United" (with Swanky Tunes)
- 2011 : "I Wanna Be Your Dog" (with Swanky Tunes)
- 2011 : "Phantom" (with Swanky Tunes)
- 2011 : "True Emotion"
- 2012 : "Quasar"
- 2012 : "Apogee" (with Swanky Tunes)
- 2012 : "The Edge" (with Swanky Tunes)
- 2012 : "Just Can't Stay Away" (with DJ Squire)
- 2012 : "Just Can't Stay Away" (with DJ Squire featuring Max 'C)
- 2012 : "Here We Go" (with Swanky Tunes)
- 2012 : "Starlight"
- 2012 : "Kaleidoscope"
- 2012 : "Chemistry (Turn the Flame Higher)" (with Swanky Tunes, Matisse & Sadko)
- 2013 : "Rasputin"
- 2013 : "Collapsar" (with Dirty Shade)
- 2013 : "Let Me Hear You Scream" (with Skidka)
- 2013 : "Stop In My Mind" (with Swanky Tunes)
- 2013 : "Get Down" (vs. Eva Shaw)
- 2014 : "Moloko" (with Skidka)
- 2014 : "Arms Around Me" (with Skidka)
- 2019 : Crazy Things (with Angelina Lavo featuring Queen Sessi)

=== Remixes ===
2007:

- Swanky Tunes – "Tomorrow" (Hard Rock Sofa Remix)

2009:

- Kyau & Albert – "Be There 4 U" (Hard Rock Sofa Remix)
- Kyau & Albert – "Hooked On Infinity" (Hard Rock Sofa Remix)
- Swanky Tunes – "Zodiac" (Hard Rock Sofa Remix)
- Swanky Tunes – "Get Up & Shout" (Hard Rock Sofa Remix)

2011:

- Swanky Tunes featuring Mr. V.I. – "Together" (Hard Rock Sofa Remix)
- Spencer and Hill – "I Spy" (Hard Rock Sofa Remix)
- Antoine Clamaran featuring Soraya Arnelas – "Stick Shift" (Hard Rock Sofa Remix)
- TV Rock featuring Zoë Badwi – "Carry Me Home" (Hard Rock Sofa Remix)
- Johnny Buss and Daniel Von B featuring J-Sun – "Do You Feel The Same" (Hard Rock Sofa Remix)
- Vengerov – "Kazantip Intro" (Swanky Tunes and Hard Rock Sofa Remix)
- Dim Chris featuring Amanda Wilson – "You Found Me" (Hard Rock Sofa Remix)
- Jus Jack featuring Black Dogs – "One Day At A Time" (Hard Rock Sofa Remix)
- Morgan Page, Sultan + Ned Shepard and BT featuring Angela McCluskey – "In The Air" (Hard Rock Sofa Remix)
- Kid Massive and Mark Le Sal – "Don't Cry" (Hard Rock Sofa Remix)
- R3hab and Swanky Tunes featuring Max C – "Sending My Love" (Hard Rock Sofa Remix)

2012:

- Marco V – "Analogital" (Hard Rock Sofa Remix)
- Norman Doray and NERVO featuring Cookie – "Something To Believe In" (Hard Rock Sofa Remix)
- Calvin Harris featuring Ne-Yo – "Let's Go" (Swanky Tunes and Hard Rock Sofa Remix)
- David Guetta featuring Taped Rai – "Just One Last Time" (Hard Rock Sofa Big Room Mix)

2013:

- Example – "Perfect Replacement" (R3hab and Hard Rock Sofa Remix)
- Ludacris featuring Usher and David Guetta – "Rest Of My Life" (Hard Rock Sofa Remix)
- Alesso featuring Matthew Koma – "Years" (Hard Rock Sofa Remix)
- Style of Eye and Tom Staar – "After Dark" (Hard Rock Sofa Remix)

2014:

Alesso featuring Tove Lo – Heroes (We Could Be) (Hard Rock Sofa and Skidka Remix)
