= City Beneath the Sea (song) =

Song by Harry Connick Jr.

"City Beneath the Sea" is a song by Harry Connick Jr., which first appears on the 1996 album Star Turtle and is included in the 2005 multi-artist benefit album Hurricane Relief: Come Together Now. The song depicts unique scenes from New Orleans and features a brief piano solo.

Connick wrote the song about New Orleans when he was at his mother-in-law's (Glenna Goodacre) house in Santa Fe, New Mexico. He says, in a 1996 interview, the song was written on a deadline to complete the album. "I wish I had spent more time on it, to make it musically into a more substantial piece of work". Addressing it as a "very, very simple piece of music."

== New Orleans ==
Music and lyrics by Connick Jr., a tribute to his hometown. "New Orleans is like a saucer, some twenty feet below sea level," he says about the title of the song in a 1996 interview. "Even a little rain will put the city underwater." He sings, "Please... somebody, won't you take me to the city beneath the sea?"

The song mentions "Pork Chop" who "dances all night long", he was a tap dancer from New Orleans, who used to dance in a few jazz clubs on Bourbon Street. There is also mention of "The Meters and the Mardi Gras". There are also the words "they betcha where you got your shoes", in New Orleans if anyone bets you they know where you got your shoes, and you take the bet, they'll tell you, "You got them on your feet!"

== Musicians ==
- Harry Connick Jr. - vocals, Piano
- Jonathan DuBose, Jr. - Guitar
- Lucien Barbarin - percussion, Cymbal
- Tony Hall - Bass
- Raymond Weber - drums

== Credits ==
- Produced by Tracey Freeman
- Recorded and Mixed by Gregg Rubin
- Recorded at Power Station, Studio A, NYC, December 1995
