= Thomas Gold (DJ) =

- Birth name: Frank Thomas Knebel-Janssen
- Also known as: Beat Riders, Dee-Luxe, Frankk, Level K, Plastic Nation, O&G Project
- Born: 9 August 1981 (age 43); Berlin, Germany
- Genres: Progressive house; electro house; tech house; trance
- Occupations: DJ; record producer
- Years active: 2000–present
- Labels: Spinnin' Records; Armada Music; Axtone Records; Size Records; Protocol Recordings

Frank Thomas Knebel-Janssen (born August 9, 1981), better known by his stage name Thomas Gold, is a German DJ and producer. His first productions were trance-based, which eventually evolved into progressive house and tech house in recent times. He was ranked at number 82 in the Top 100 DJs survey conducted by DJ Magazine in 2012.

== Biography ==
When Thomas was seven years old, he learned to play the electronic organ, and his interest in digital synthesizers and his passion for music emerged. At the age of 15 he bought his first piece, a synthesizer Yamaha DX-11.

Several international labels have signed or released music by Gold, including CR2 (UK), Ministry of Sound (UK and Australia), Positiva (UK), Nero / Joia (Sweden), Vendetta (Spain), Cyber and Scorpio (France), Time (Italy), Universal (USA), Egoiste (Switzerland).

His 2008 remixed version of the classic "Silence" by the group Delerium was successful on the Beatport download list and won the coveted Beatport Music for Best Progressive House Song. This success then resulted in singles such as "Don't You Want Me", "Everybody Be Somebody", and "Losing My Religion".

His first production in 2009 was in collaboration with Matthias Menck, "Everybody Be Somebody". Also in 2009, he agreed with the renowned UK label CR2 to launch a production in collaboration with Lee Cabrera, a new version of the biggest Ibiza anthems "Shake It (Move a Little Closer)".

After joining Toolroom Records, he became a resident of events held by the label including "Toolroom Knights" with artists like Fedde le Grand and Mark Knight.

Thomas has gained some recognition in the dance scene from figures such as Axwell, Steve Angello, Tiësto, David Guetta, Chuckie, John Dahlbäck and Sander van Doorn.

In 2010 he released the productions "Agora" [Size], "Work That" / "Kananga" [Toolroom], "The Button" [Toolroom], "Marsch Marsch" [Toolroom], "Areena" (with David Tort and David Gausa), "What's Up" with Alex Kenji [Spinnin'] and in 2011, he released a version of "Star69" by Fatboy Slim [Skint].

In January 2011, he released "Blow Up" by Hard Rock Sofa and St. Brothers through Axtone, and also remixed the song in collaboration with Axwell, which rose to number three on the Beatport chart. During 2011 he also remixed "Set Fire to the Rain" by Adele and "Judas" by Lady Gaga. His remix of "Judas" was well received by Swedish House Mafia, who often included it in their live sets. Thomas Gold has spoken openly about the support he has received from Swedish House Mafia, especially when he started to start producing progressive house.

In terms of his own productions, he released the single "Alive" with the Australian DJ and producer Dirty South, which was named as Essential New Tune on BBC Radio 1 on July 8, 2011 and reached number two on the Beatport charts and became a house anthem of summer 2011.

Also in 2011, he performed at the Masquerade Motel in Miami at an event held by Swedish House Mafia, on the main stage of the festival Tomorrowland and as a headliner at Space Miami, Pacha NYC and Ministry of Sound, among others.

In late January 2012, he released more new material, again with the collaboration of Australian DJ Dirty South and singer Kate Elsworth on a song called "Eyes Wide Open", released through Dirty South's label Phazing.

Further productions included his remix of "Leave a Light On" by the Swedish producer Henrik B (winter / spring on Axtone) and "Sing2Me" (March 2012 on Axtone), which was released by Swedish House Mafia at their Essential Selection set with Pete Tong on September 16, 2011 on BBC Radio 1.

In June 2012, Axwell's label Axtone presented the first titular compilation mixed by Thomas Gold. The album compiles remixes, productions (three of which are unpublished as The Beginning, Fanfare and Circles) and reversions of songs like "Teenage Crime" by Adrian Lux. To conclude 2012, he released "MIAO" through Calvin Harris' label Fly Eye Records. Since 2015, he has edited several of his productions through the record label Armada Music.

== Awards and nominations ==
=== DJ Magazine top 100 DJs ===
Year	Position	Notes	Ref.
2012	82	New entry	
2019	89	Re-entry	
