= Kate Elsworth =

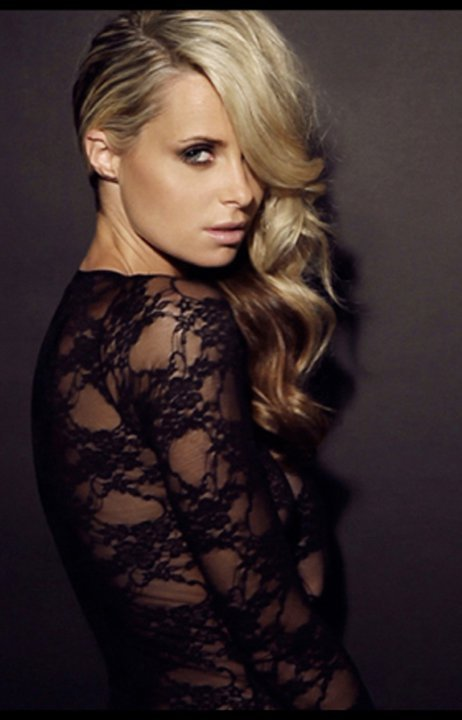

Background information
- Born: Sydney, Australia
- Genres: House,
- Occupation(s): Disc jockey record producer singer-songwriter
- Instrument: Vocals
- Years active: 2006–present
- Labels: Defected, Mobilee, Kindisch, French Kitchen Records, Voyeur Music
- Website: Kate Elsworth on Facebook

Kate Elsworth is an Australian-born electronic dance music DJ, vocalist and songwriter based in London.

== Biography ==
In 2009, she formed a dance band with her New York-based co-producer and business partner, DJ Exacta. She has worked with other artists like Sonny Fodera and Dubfire. She has performed around the globe including nightclub gigs at Amnesia on Ibiza.

Kate spent time in Ibiza, developing an ear for house music. In 2010, Elsworth began DJing, with headline parties at Ibiza. In 2011, her singles released on Hed Kandi, a collaboration with DJ Exacta, "Empty Spaces" and "Bow & Arrow". In 2014, Elsworth teamed up with James Doman releasing their track "Stand Still" on Café Mambo, 20 Years of Ibiza Chillout. In 2016, Elsworth released two tracks with Defected on Sonny Fodera's album Frequently Flying.

Kate joined forces with Nicolas Blistene, a French Deejay as well as a composer, originally known as one of the "Sucré Salé" duo early in 2017 forming the DJ duo Lunar Disco. They released their track 'Merveilleux' with Sucre Sale on the album "Voyeur Ibiza 2017". In 2017 Lunar Disco compiled the latest Buddha Bar album called 'Buddha-Bar Meets French Kitchen & Friends' featuring one of their next releases "Fidji". The album was top two on iTunes in the electronic charts after two days of release. Early in 2018 they signed their first EP on Kindisch Records called Winterfell featuring two other tracks called Balkan Consortium and Make It Beautiful which ranked in the top 100 on Beatport.

== Discography ==
=== Singles / EPs ===
- 2011 Empty Spaces
- 2011 Bow & Arrow
- 2016 Wasted
- 2017 Merveilleux
- 2017 Winterfell EP
