= Elephante =

American disc jockey and music producer

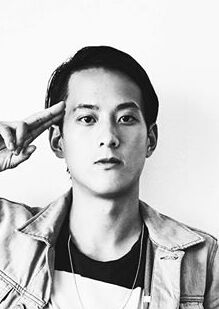

Background information
- Born: Tim Heng Wu; November 10, 1989 (age 36); Ann Arbor, Michigan, United States
- Genres: Big Room House; Progressive House; Pop; Future Bass
- Occupations: DJ; Musician; Producer; Singer; Music Producer
- Instruments: Digital audio workstation; guitar; piano
- Years active: 2013–present
- Label: Armada
- Website: elephantemusic.com

Tim Heng Wu (born November 10, 1989), better known by his stage name Elephante, is an American musician, DJ, singer and music producer based in Los Angeles.

== Early life ==
Wu was born in Ann Arbor, Michigan. His parents were born in Taipei, Taiwan and moved to the United States in their 20s. He is based in Los Angeles. He started to play music at an early age and taught himself to play guitar and was trained to play classical piano. He majored in economics at Harvard University. In 2011, he graduated and wanted to involve himself in the music industry as an acoustic singer-songwriter before he moved on to electronic dance music.

Wu began using "Elephante" as a stage name because it was a reference to the phrase "elephant in the room" which he described as his unhappiness of working at a corporate job since he wanted to be a musician.

== Musical style ==
Wu describes his music as melodic electronic music that fuses with various other genres.

His preferred genres are big room, progressive house and regularly incorporates pop and trap into his music. His songs have been played on streaming services such as SoundCloud for over a million times. Trap high-hats, deep house elements and house synths are incorporated into his melodic sounds. Wu has quoted Skrillex to be his inspiration in music, citing "Scary Monsters and Nice Sprites" astonished him.

Wu uses Ableton Live as his digital audio workstation and previously used GarageBand, FruityLoops and Pro Tools. He remixed songs for artists such as Calvin Harris, Galantis, The Chainsmokers, Jack Ü and Zedd.

== Career ==
=== 2014: SERC Fall Concert ===
In October 2014, Wu performed at SERC Fall Concert alongside Sage the Gemini.

=== 2015: Beginnings ===
Wu started his career by remixing music for artists before began releasing original songs. His first single was self-released, titled "Temporary Love" which features the vocals of Brooke Forman. He released his first single through Armada Records titled "I Want You" featuring Rumors. He opened for headliners Deorro and MAKJ at the 2015 Echostage in June.

=== 2016: Debut extended play ===
In 2016, he released his debut extended play titled "I Am the Elephante". The EP consists of nine songs of progressive house, synthpop and trap. He released a single titled "Age of Innocence" featuring Trouze and Damon Sharp. The song peaked on Billboard's Dance/Club chart at 18th and received over a million plays on Spotify. His single "Closer" featuring Bishop had peaked on the Spotify 'Viral 50' chart at 27th. Spotify 'Velocity' has "Closer" and another single titled "Plans" featuring Brandyn Burnette charted at 22nd and 28th respectively. The third single "Hold" from the EP was released, it features American singer Jessica Jarrell.

=== 2018–present: Glass Mansion ===
On 15 June 2018, Wu released his second EP, titled Glass Mansion. The nine-track extended play includes the previously released singles "Troubled", "Come Back for You", "The In Between" and "Have It All". The EP reached number one on iTunes in the US Dance album category. Compared to his previous release, Wu takes a stripped-back approach on this extended play, with songs featuring more light guitar melodies than electronic instrumentals.

Describing the EP on Twitter, Elephante said it is about "realizing that no matter how beautiful and strong what we build is, it's ultimately fragile and one stone could bring it all down. It's about coming to peace with the fact that it all might never be finished, and that's okay. It's about realizing that our Glass Mansion isn't the answer to all our problems, and it's about the journey of finding grace and happiness in a half-built home." In October 2019, he announced a live tour titled the "Diamond Days Tour", which is based on his single of the same name and dubbed the "natural evolution" of his evolving live shows.

== Discography ==
=== Albums ===
Title	Details
Heavy Glow	Released: October 20, 2021; Label: Zoo Music; Format: Digital download

=== Extended plays ===
Title	Details
I Am the Elephante	Released: September 14, 2016; Label: Self-released; Format: Digital download
Glass Mansion	Released: June 15, 2018; Label: Self-released; Format: Digital download

=== Singles ===
Title	Year	Peak chart positions	Album
Title	Year	US Airplay	Album
"Temporary Love" (featuring Brooke Forman)	2015	—	Non-album singles
"I Want You" (featuring Rumors)	2015	—	Non-album singles
"Age of Innocence" (with Trouze and Damon Sharpe)	2016	—	Non-album singles
"Shake the Earth" (featuring Lyon Hart)	2016	—	I Am the Elephante
"Closer" (featuring BISHØP)	2016	18	I Am the Elephante
"Hold" (featuring Jessica Jarrell)	2016	—	I Am the Elephante
"Dynasty" (with Miia)	2016	—	I Am the Elephante
"Catching On" (featuring Nevve)	2016	—	I Am the Elephante
"Sirens" (featuring Nevve)	2016	—	I Am the Elephante
"Plans" (featuring Brandyn Burnette)	2016	—	I Am the Elephante
"Troubled" (featuring Deb's Daughter)	2017	—	Glass Mansion
"Come Back for You" (featuring Matluck)	2017	—	Glass Mansion
"The In Between" (featuring Anjulie)	2018	8	Glass Mansion
"Have It All" (featuring Nevve)	2018	—	Glass Mansion
"Shooting Stars"	2019	—	Non-album single
"Diamond Days"	2019	—	Diamond Days
"Chameleon" (with Mako)	2020	—	Non-album single
"High Water"	2021	—	Heavy Glow
"Holy Ghosts"	2021	—	Heavy Glow
"Dopamine"	2021	—	Heavy Glow
"Love Again" (with SABAI)	2022	_	
"Hollow" (with Haliene)	2023	31	Non-album single
"No Explanations" (with Stephanie Poetri and Zhang Yanqi)	2023	—	Non-album single
"Right Before Our Eyes" (with BEAUZ and Mark Tuan)	2023	_	
"All Is Not Lost"	2023	_	
"Leave The Ground" (with Amber Liu)	2023	_	
"Say It Like You Mean It" (with SABAI featuring Olivia Ray)	2024	_	
"Know Your Name" (with HOANG featuring HALUNA)	2024	_	
"All We Get" (with yetep featuring Daye)	2024	_	
"Better Than Me" (with TWLGHT)	2025	_	
"Shine" (with GONE ASTRAY)	2025	_	
"Dreaming Season" (with x.o.anne)	2025	_	
"Nothing To You" (with Daye and shXdow)	2025	_	
"—" denotes a recording that did not chart or was not released.

=== Remixes ===
==== 2013 ====
- Kaskade and Project 46 – "Last Chance" (Elephante Remix)
- The Unlikely Candidates – "Follow My Feet" (Elephante Remix)

==== 2014 ====
- AYER – "Young" (Elephante Remix)
- Katy Perry featuring Juicy J – "Dark Horse" (Elephante Remix)
- The Chainsmokers – "#Selfie" (Elephante Remix)
- Lorde – "Team" (Elephante Remix)
- Afrojack featuring Wrabel – "Ten Feet Tall" (Elephante Remix)
- Calvin Harris – "Summer" (Elephante Remix)
- Galantis – "Help" (Elephante Remix)
- Clean Bandit – "Rather Be" (Elephante Remix)
- Oliver Heldens – "Gecko" (Elephante Remix)
- Sander van Doorn, Martin Garrix and DVBBS – "Gold Skies" (Elephante Remix)
- Lemaitre – "Wait" (Elephante Remix)
- Dirty South – "Unbreakable" (Elephante Remix)
- Penguin Prison – "Calling Out" (Elephante Remix)

==== 2015 ====
- The Magician featuring Years & Years – "Sunlight" (Elephante Remix)
- Jack Ü featuring Justin Bieber – "Where Are Ü Now" (Elephante Remix)
- Oh, Be Clever – "Next To You" (Elephante Remix)
- Zedd featuring Selena Gomez – "I Want You To Know" (Elephante Remix)
- Phoebe Ryan – "Mine" (Elephante Remix)
- Deluka – "Home" (Elephante Remix)
- Jason Derulo – "Cheyenne" (Elephante Remix)
- Mako – "Smoke Filled Room" (Elephante Remix)
- Nathan Sykes – "Over And Over Again" (Elephante Remix)
- Miia – "Dynasty" (Elephante Remix)

==== 2016 ====
- Stephen – "Crossfire" (Elephante Remix)
- Bebe Rexha – "No Broken Hearts" (Elephante Remix)
- Nathan Sykes – "Famous" (Elephante Remix)

==== 2018 ====
- Elephante featuring Anjulie – "The In Between" (Elephante "Zoo" Remix)
