= Project 46 =

Canadian DJ and producer duo made up of Thomas Shaw and Ryan Henderson

Project 46 (Electronic duo)
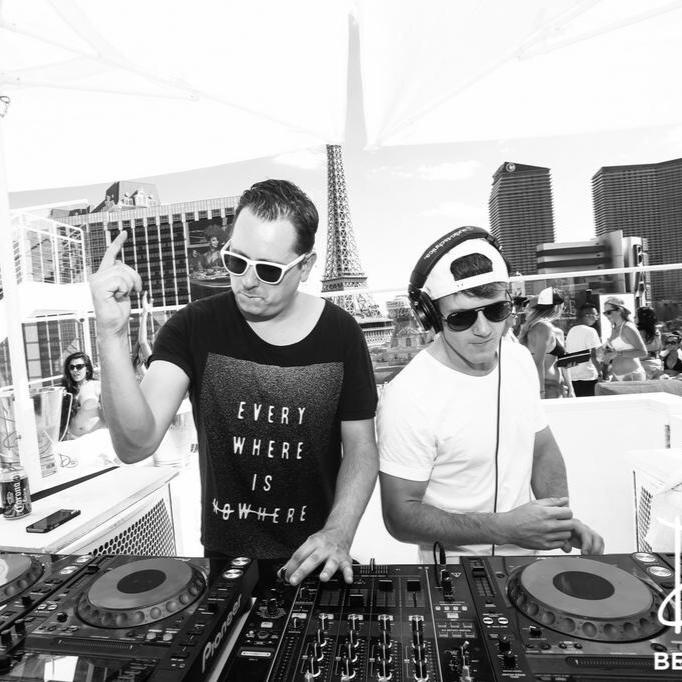
- Project 46's Ryan Henderson and Thomas Shaw

Background information
- Origin: Vancouver, British Columbia, Canada (Shaw); Waterloo, Ontario, Canada (Henderson)
- Genres: Progressive house • electro house • electronica
- Years active: 2011 - present
- Labels: Monstercat; Spinnin'; Ultra; Manufactured Music; RCA; Zouk
- Members: Ryan Henderson; Thomas Shaw
- Website: http://project46.com/

Project 46 is a Canadian DJ/producer duo made up of Thomas Shaw and Ryan Henderson. They are best known for their tracks "Last Chance" with Kaskade, "Collide" with Laidback Luke and "Reasons" featuring Andrew Allen.

== Biography ==
=== Early life ===
Henderson was born in Waterloo, Ontario, and Shaw in Vancouver, where they both still reside.

Growing up, Shaw was always involved in the arts, taking part in piano lessons, choir training, and school theatre, while also finding time to teach himself the guitar and drums. Though originally interested in Alternative music, Shaw was later introduced to dance music and FL Studio by a friend, which the pair use for production to this day. Before joining Project 46 Shaw worked at a local Costco while majoring in computer science at a local university.

Henderson grew up listening to Euro-style music like Alice DJ, and grew his passion for dance music through working events. Prior to teaming up with Shaw, Henderson ran two successful nightclubs in Waterloo, 140 West and Tabu, before a fire in 2010 destroyed both of the clubs. Later, another local club owner was charged with arson. In November 2010 Henderson opened BETA in Waterloo, which after 6 years of bringing top talent like Steve Angello, Tiesto and Avicii, closed its doors in early 2017.

During their time as individual DJs, Henderson played at local nightclubs for fun while Shaw held a weekly residency at a local pub in Port Coquitlam.

=== Music career ===
Project 46 was formed in June 2011 after Henderson and Shaw met through a mutual friend via Skype. Their first collaboration came in the form of an unofficial bootleg of Swedish House Mafia's "Save The World," which they produced from opposite sides of the country. From there Project 46 built a loyal fanbase by releasing a new original, bootleg or remix every Friday on their SoundCloud, which they jokingly called "Pancake Fridays". The name stuck and is still used by the pair to this day.

Project 46's first official release was a collaboration with 15grams titled "Dreaming" featuring Matthew Sartori on and came out on September 17, 2011. The track broke Beatport's Top 100 and marked the start of their fruitful career with Canadian label Monstercat. Multiple Top 100 hits followed on Monstercat before Project 46 made their first undeniable impact on the dance music scene with their breakthrough release "Reasons" featuring the vocals of Andrew Allen in April 2012. Within a week "Reasons" shot past Tiesto’s remix of "Somebody I Used To Know" to take the #1 spot on Beatport overall, and was the first of their tracks to garner radio play on BBC Radio 1 and Sirius XM. That same year Project 46 debuted at #100 on the DJ Mag Top 100 list, joining Richie Hawtin and Deadmau5 as the only Canadian DJs to make the poll.

Project 46's career took off in 2013 as world-renowned producers started to take notice of their talent. Their first big-name collaboration was in February with dance music legend Paul Oakenfold on "Higher" featuring Daphne, which they released for free download and saw support from the likes of Gareth Emery, Thomas Gold and 3lau. The well-received single was followed by two Beatport Top 10s, both within the space of a month, for "You & I" with DubVision featuring Donna Lewis on SPINNIN' and "No One" featuring Matthew Steeper on Monstercat.

In September 2013, Project 46 put out their biggest hit to date, a collaboration with top producer Kaskade titled "Last Chance" that was featured as the opening track on his Grammy-nominated album Atmosphere. "Last Chance" saw heavy radio play on BBC Radio 1 and Sirius XM, and its official music video was added to MTV Clubland's rotation. The pair wrapped up the landmark year jumping 30 spots on DJ Mag's Top 100 DJs poll to #70 before being commissioned by popular act Krewella for an official remix of "United Kids of the World".

Project 46 kicked off 2014 releasing a collaboration with Laidback Luke titled "Collide" featuring Collin McLoughlin on Luke's MixMash label. The track hit the Top 20 Overall on Beatport, received radio play on BBC Radio 1 and Sirius XM, and saw support from big names like Tiesto, George Acosta, Danny Howard, R3hab and more.

Following the release of "Collide" the duo took on a heavy touring schedule, but still found time to release their Beatport Top 10 collaboration with fellow Canadian producer Bynon titled "Eyes", garnering play from the likes of Pete Tong, Paul Oakenfold, EDX, Gareth Emery, Afrojack, Benny Benassi and more. On November 21 they put out their last track of the year, and second collaboration with Laidback Luke, called "Memories".

In May 2014 Project 46 signed a deal with Ultra/Sony for their debut album, which was slated for an early 2015 release.

In May 2015, the duo returned to Monstercat with a Remix of Karma Fields' and Kerli's song "Build The Cities". Two months later, on July 10, they released their debut album Beautiful containing 12 songs, including their previously released Kaskade collaboration "Last Chance". In December 2015, the duo returned to Monstercat with a single called "Signs" (featuring Shantee).

=== Touring ===
As DJs, Project 46 have played notable events including TomorrowWorld, Ultra Music Festival, Groove Cruise, Escapade, Squamish Music Festival, Beyond Wonderland, The Hudson Project and more. Their first DJ gig was at a nightclub called Tabu in Guelph, Ontario, where they were billed below a piece of hardware called the Emulator. They were later kicked off the stage by the local resident for not playing to his taste, and were paid $150 for the show.

In March 2013 Project 46 began their first headlining "No One" Tour, titled after their Beatport Top 10 hit. Later that year the pair were asked by Grammy-nominated producer Morgan Page to join Phase 1 of his Morgan Page Presents 3D Tour, the first 3D DJ Tour of its kind that kicked off in September 2013.

Exactly a year after their first tour, Project 46 embarked on their 60+ date "Collide" Tour in March 2014, named after their Beatport Top 10 collaboration with Laidback Luke. This was followed by a 20-date "Eyes" Fall tour, inspired by their next Beatport Top 10 hit with BYNON.

Project 46 held residencies at Drai's in Las Vegas and Exchange in Los Angeles.

== Discography ==
=== Albums ===
Beautiful LP (Ultra Music) Release Date - July 10, 2015

- "Beautiful (It Hurts)"
- "Forgettable (featuring Olivia)"
- "Destroy Me (featuring Brooke Tomlinson)"
- "The Truth (featuring Jovany)"
- "My Only Friend (featuring Sam James)"
- "I Found You (featuring Jesse Weeks)"
- "Beat Again (featuring Karl Wolf)"
- "Take Away the Pain (featuring Ava Koci)"
- "Last Chance (with Kaskade)"
- "Friend Zone"
- "Memories (with Laidback Luke)"
- "Search and Rescue (featuring Haliene)"

=== EPs ===
- 2013: Continuum [Monstercat]
1. "Waiting" (with Soundwell) (featuring KORY)
2. "Catalyst"
3. "Ekho"
- 2016: Summer Feels [Monstercat]
1. "Stars" (featuring Haley)
2. "Signs" (featuring Shantee)
3. "Summer"
4. "Falling" (with Felicity)

=== Singles ===
- 2011: "Dreaming" (with 15grams) (featuring Matthew Sartori) (Monstercat)
- 2011: "Limitless" [Monstercat]
- 2011: "Slide" [Monstercat]
- 2011: "Crazy" (with Gemellini) (featuring Corinne Lee) [Monstercat]
- 2011: "Deadline" (with Gemellini) [Monstercat]
- 2012: "Reasons" (featuring Andrew Allen) [Monstercat]
- 2012: "Feel The Fire" [Zouk Recordings/Armada]
- 2012: "Braveheart" [Manufactured Music]
- 2012: "M.O.A.B" [Monstercat]
- 2012: "You & I" (with DubVision) (featuring Donna Lewis) [SPINNIN’]
- 2012: "The Rift" [Whitelabel]
- 2012: "The Anthem" (with Varien and Ephixa) [Monstercat]
- 2012: "Hasselhoff" [Monstercat]
- 2012: "Wut" (with Mar!no) [Monstercat]
- 2013: "Faces" [Whitelabel]
- 2013: "Higher" (with Paul Oakenfold) (featuring Daphne)
- 2013: "No One" (featuring Matthew Steeper) [Monstercat]
- 2013: "Last Chance" (with Kaskade) [Ultra]
- 2013: "Motionless" (featuring Seri) [Monstercat]
- 2014: "Collide" (with Laidback Luke) (featuring Collin McLoughlin) [MixMash]
- 2014: "Eyes" (with Bynon) [Ultra]
- 2014: "Memories" (with Laidback Luke) [Ultra]
- 2015: "Home" (with Feenixpawl and BYNON) [Ultra]
- 2015: "You" [Ultra]
- 2015: "Zoedic" [Ultra]
- 2015: "Beautiful (It Hurts)" [Ultra]
- 2015: "Signs" (featuring Shantee) [Monstercat]
- 2016: "Castles" (with Bynon) [Arkade]
- 2016: "Falling" (with Felicity) [Monstercat]
- 2020: "Remember You" (with Linney) [Pink Pineapple]
- 2020: "Somebody New" (with Bynon) [Pink Pineapple]
- 2020: "Chains" (with Kaskade) [Arkade]
- 2020: "Chains Chilled" (with Kaskade) [Arkade]

=== Remixes ===
- 2012: Flo Rida featuring Sia - Wild Ones
- 2012: Kelly Clarkson - "Stronger" (What Doesn't Kill You)"
- 2012: Usher - "Scream" [RCA Records]
- 2012: Usher - "Numb" [RCA Records]
- 2012: Haddaway – "What is Love" [Razor and Tie]
- 2012: Pink – "Blow Me (One Last Kiss)"
- 2013: Kelly Clarkson - "People Like Us" [RCA Records]
- 2013: Krewella and Headhunterz - "United Kids of the World" [Ultra]
- 2014: Ariana and the Rose – "In Your Bed" [Pookiebird LLC]
- 2015: Karma Fields - Build The Cities (featuring Kerli) [Monstercat]
- 2015: Ava Max - "Take Away the Pain"
- 2016: Trouze - "Intersection"
