= Damon Sharpe =

American record producer (born 1972)

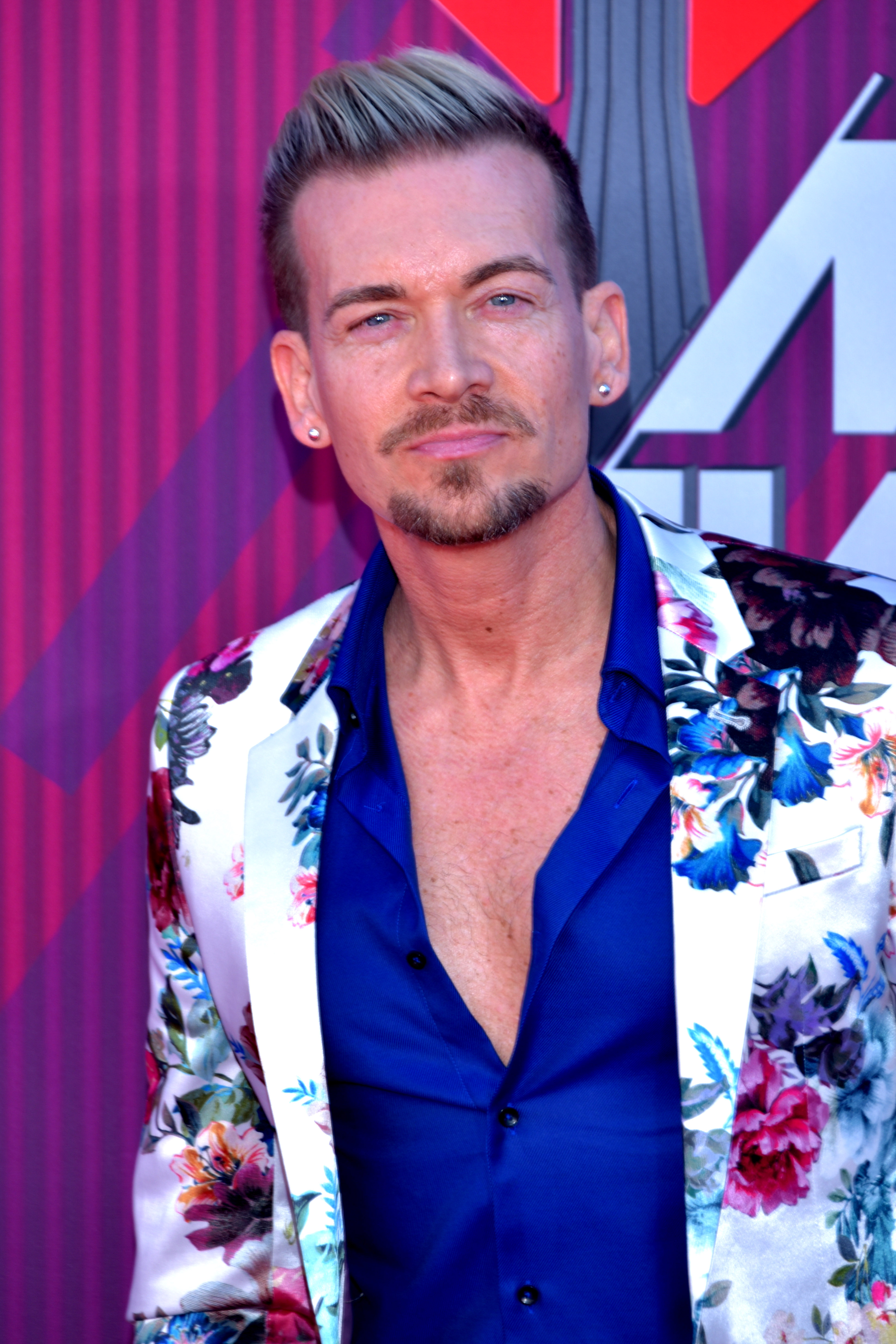
- Sharpe at the 2019 iHeartRadio Music Awards

Background information
- Born: Born July 10, 1972 (Age 53) Damon Jared Reinagle
- Origin: Los Angeles, California, United States
- Genres: Pop, R&B, dance, hip hop
- Occupations: Songwriter, record producer, DJ, recording artist, music executive, vocal coach, actor
- Website: https://damonsharpe.com/

Damon Sharpe, born Damon Jared Reinagle (born July 10, 1972), is an American record producer, songwriter, DJ, actor and recording artist who works in Los Angeles. He first reached notability as a member of Guys Next Door. He has since contributed to various albums that have cumulatively sold over 40 million copies and have been streamed over 2 billion times. He has over 80 million streams as a solo artist and 800k monthly streams on Spotify.

== Current career ==
Sharpe is active in Los Angeles. He is signed to Armada Music and has worked with various contemporary artists such as Jennifer Lopez, Ariana Grande, Pitbull, Alesso, Kylie Minogue, Anastacia, Kelly Rowland of Destiny's Child, Loud Luxury, Flo Rida, New Boyz, Monica, Charlie Wilson, NKOTB, Nelly, A1, Ginuwine, Amerie, CoCo Lee, 98 Degrees, American Idol's Kimberley Locke and Justin Guarini, Natalie Cole, Corbin Bleu, Korean and Japanese artists Got7, 2PM, SF9, BoA, Shinee, Da-ice, Kangta, Laboum, Kim Jae-joong, Ai, W-inds, T-ara, Kumi Koda, B1A4, Fairies and others. He has collaborated with EDM DJs Alesso, Thomas Gold, DVBBS, Morgan Page, Zonderling, Gattuso, Elephante, Kap Slap, Mischa Daniels, and Ferry Corsten. In 2005 he released the Hurricane Katrina relief record Come Together Now written with actress Sharon Stone and featuring contributions from Celine Dion, Nick Carter, Joss Stone, Jesse McCartney, Patti LaBelle, Wyclef Jean, Gavin DeGraw, Anthony Hamilton, The Game, JoJo, John Legend, Kimberley Locke, Natalie Cole, Brian McKnight, AJ McLean, Mýa, Aaron Carter, Stacie Orrico, Kelly Price, and Ruben Studdard. Other releases include works by Boyz II Men, 98 Degrees, JLS, Leona Lewis, Big Time Rush, and more. He also appeared on season 2 of The X Factor as one of the on camera vocal coaches.

Sharpe appeared as a coach/judge on the YTV spinoff series The Next Star: SuperGroup that aired spring 2014.

In 2022, Sharpe launched his own record electronic/dance record label entitled Brainjack Music. The same year, he also performed his second DJ set at Electric Daisy Carnival in Las Vegas.

== Discography ==
Discography
| Title | Artist | Label |
|---|---|---|
| "Party Monster" | 2PM | Sony Music Japan |
| "Cherry On Top" | 10시 45분 | Dreamus |
| "No More" | A1 | Columbia UK |
| "Brand New Day" | Ai | Universal Sigma |
| "Enough of Me" | Aaron Carter | Transcontinental Records |
| "It's U" | Abraham Mateo | Sony Music Spain |
| "Fue Un Error Amarte" | Abraham Mateo | Sony Music Spain |
| "I'm Feeling So Good" feat. CD9 | Abraham Mateo | Sony Music Spain |
| "Been There Done That" | Afro Z | |
| Cool | Alesso | Def Jam Records |
| "415" | Alex Donofrio and Damon Sharpe | |
| "Flesh & Bone" | Alex Mattson & Damon Sharpe ft Cimo Frankel | Sony Music Finland |
| "Na Na Na" | Alicja Janosz | RCA |
| "Dangerous" | Amerie | Island Def Jam |
| "Broken Wings" | Anastacia | BMG Rights Management |
| "Defeated" | Anastacia | Mercury and Island Def Jam |
| "Naughty" | Anastacia | Mercury and Island Def Jam |
| "Love Is A Crime" of Chicago: Music from the Miramax Motion Picture | Anastacia | Epic |
| "Paid My Dues" | Anastacia | Epic |
| "Why’d you Lie To Me" | Anastacia | Epic |
| "You’ll Be Fine" | Anastacia | Mercury and Island Def Jam |
| "Brokedown Palace" | Angemi & Ale Q | Smash the House |
| "Pink Champagne" | Ariana Grande | Republic |
| "Cuts and Bruises" | Asher D | Independiente Records |
| "Only One" | B5 | Bad Boy Records |
| "Nothin Even Matters" | Big Time Rush | Nickelodeon and Columbia |
| "Elevate" | Big Time Rush | Nickelodeon and Columbia |
| "Love Me Love Me" | Big Time Rush | Nickelodeon and Columbia |
| "All Over Again" | Big Time Rush | Nickelodeon and Columbia |
| "Crazy For U" | Big Time Rush | Nickelodeon and Columbia |
| "24/7" | Big Time Rush | Nickelodeon and Columbia |
| "Untouchable" | Big Time Rush | Nickelodeon and Columbia |
| "Love Me Again" | Big Time Rush | Nickelodeon and Columbia |
| "Run Wild" | Big Time Rush | Nickelodeon and Columbia |
| "Sushi" | BIJOU & DVRKO & Damon Sharpe | DVRPKO |
| "Sweet Thing" | Blue | Innocent and Virgin UK |
| "Lose Your Mind" | BoA | Avex Records |
| "Feel You" | BoA | SM Entertainment |
| "Losing Sleep" | Boyz II Men | BMG Rights Management |
| "Feel The Love" | Cahill feat. Kimberley Locke | 3 Beat and AATW |
| "Blink" | Cascada | Kontor Records |
| "My Favorite Part of You" | Charlie Wilson | RCA Records |
| "Good Time" | Charlie Wilson feat. Pitbull | RCA Records |
| Down to Earth (soundtrack) | Chris Rock | Epic |
| "Cool" | CoCo Lee | Epic |
| "Gotta Clue" | CoCo Lee | Epic |
| "So Good" | CoCo Lee | Epic |
| "Marchin" | Corbin Bleu | Hollywood Records |
| "Mixed Up" | Corbin Bleu | Hollywood Records |
| "Hollaback Girl" | Damon Sharpe | Brainjack |
| "Lost Years" | Damon Sharpe | Loudkult |
| "Man of the Year" | Damon Sharpe | STSN |
| "Spontaneous" | Damon Sharpe | Loudkult |
| "Own That" | Damon Sharpe | Hood Politics |
| "Solid Ground" | Damon Sharpe & Afterdark & Kate Wild | Brainjack |
| "Safe Haven" | Damon Sharpe & Chris Burke | Purple Fly |
| "15 Minutes" | Damon Sharpe & Disco Fries | Armada |
| "Hotta Fire" | Damon Sharpe & Jeff Retro | Brainjack |
| "Is It Me" | Damon Sharpe feat. Krayzie Bone | London and Sire Records |
| "First Time" | Damon Sharpe ft Polina Grace | Armada |
| "Point the Sky" | Damon Sharpe ft Polina Grace | Armada |
| "Let's Get Real" | Damon Sharpe & Raven & Kreyn ft Alle | Armada |
| "Dock of the Bay" | Damon Sharpe ft Scarlett | Brainjack |
| "Naughty Girl" | Damon Sharpe ft Tima Dee | Brainjack |
| "Wicked Ways" | DVBBS feat. Stella Rio | Spinnin' Records |
| "Age of Innocence" | Elephante, Trouze, Damon Sharpe | Armada Music |
| "Hemera" | Exile | Avex Records |
| "Hero" | Fairies | Avex Trax |
| "Not Alone" | Ferry Corsten | Armada |
| "High Heels" | Flo Rida & Walker Hayes (Damon Sharpe Remix) | APG |
| "Club Hopping" | Gareth Gates | 19 and RCA UK |
| "Enough of Me" | Gareth Gates | 19 and RCA UK |
| "Groove With Me" | Gareth Gates | 19 and RCA UK |
| "Just Say Yes" | Gareth Gates | 19 and RCA UK |
| "When In Rome" | Gattüso & Damon Sharpe | Armada |
| "Faces" | Gian Varela & Damon Sharpe ft Matluck | Mixmash Records |
| "Just Because" | Ginuwine | Epic |
| "2 in the Morning" | Girlicious | Universal Records Canada |
| "Sick" | Got7 | JYP Entertainment |
| "Marchin" | High School Musical: The Concert | Hollywood Records |
| "There for You" | Hilary Roberts | Red Songbird |
| "Fight to the Other Side" | Hilary Roberts | Red Songbird |
| "The Storm Center" | INTO1 | 腾讯视频 |
| "Critical" | Jason Malachi | JMRP |
| "So Done", | Jeannie Ortega | Hollywood Records |
| "Love Don’t Cost A Thing" | Jennifer Lopez | Epic |
| "3D" | JLS | Epic |
| "This Ones For Me And U" feat. New Edition | Johnny Gill | Caroline |
| "Doin' Things" | Justin Guarini | 19 & RCA |
| "Erase You" | Kaaze | Revealed Recordings |
| "Undercover" | Kalimba | Sony Records |
| "Many Times" | Kangta | SM Entertainment |
| "Famous" | Katy Tiz | Lava |
| "Every Time You Walk Out That Door" | Kelly Rowland | Columbia |
| "No Man No Cry" | Kelly Rowland | Columbia |
| "Welcome To My Wild World" | Kim Jae-joong | C-JeS Studios |
| "Doing It Tonite," | Kimberley Locke | Curb Records |
| "Hey DJ" | Kimberley Locke | Curb Records |
| "Last Christmas" | Kimberley Locke | Curb Records |
| "Now I Can Fly" | Kimberley Locke | Curb Records |
| "Supa’woman" | Kimberley Locke | Curb Records |
| "Talk About Us" | Kimberley Locke | Curb Records |
| "What I Gotta Do" | Kimberley Locke | Curb Records |
| "You Don’t Have To Be Strong" | Kimberley Locke | Curb Records |
| "Get Outta My Way" | Kylie Minogue | EMI |
| "Go Hard or Go Home" | Kylie Minogue | EMI |
| "Story Travel" | Laboum | NH Media, Nega Network |
| "Bang Bang" | Laboum | Capitol Records |
| "Rich" | Laboum | Capitol Records |
| "Safe With Me (Damon Sharpe Remix" | Loud Luxury ft Drew Love | Armada |
| "Safe With Me" | Loud Luxury ft Drew Love | Armada |
| "No Looking Back" | Mandy & Damon Sharpe | Dirty Workz |
| "No Good in Goodbye" | Mercury 4 | |
| "I Wrote This Song" | Monica | J Records |
| "Just Another Girl" | Monica | J Records |
| "Beautiful Disaster" | Morgan Page, feat. Stella Rio and Damon Sharpe | Armada Music |
| "Fire & Gold" | Morgan Page & VIVID ft Alle & Damon Sharpe | Armada |
| "Dangerous Mind" | Mýa | Motown |
| "Just Be A Man About It" | Mýa | Motown |
| "Say A Little Prayer" | Natalie Cole | Verve |
| "Phantom Heart" | Ørjan Nilsen & Damon Sharpe | Armada |
| "Ghost Ship" | Ørjan Nilsen & Damon Sharpe | Armada |
| "Break My Bank" | New Boyz: feat. Iyaz | Asylum and Warner Bros. Records |
| "Hard (Not Luvin U)" | NKOTB | NKOTB Music |
| "Another Love Story" | PLAY | Epic |
| "Never Never land" | PLAY | Epic |
| Cell Block Tango of Chicago: Music from the Miramax Motion Picture | Queen Latifah feat. Lil' Kim and Macy Gray) | Epic |
| "Dirty Paradise" | Reece Mastin | Sony Music Entertainment |
| "How I Do" | Rigo Luna | Machete and Universal |
| "321" | SHINee | Universal |
| "Vacant Eyes" | SOREN & Damon Sharpe ft Sarah De Warren | Dirty Workz |
| "Act Like You Know" | Stacie Orrico | Virgin |
| "Gifted" | Stacie Orrico | Virgin |
| "Jump the Gun" | Stacie Orrico | Virgin |
| "Let It Go" | Stacie Orrico | Virgin |
| "Life After You" | Sunnery James & Ryan Marciano ft RANI | Armada |
| "Ooh La La" | T-ara | MBK Entertainment |
| "Jumpstart" | These Kids Wear Crowns | Capitol Records/EMI |
| "Saints & Sinners" | Thomas Gold ft M.BRONX | Armada |
| "Yellow Light" | Tiffany | SM Entertainment |
| "Yellow Light" | Tiffany Young | SM Entertainment |
| "Outlaw" | Tren'L | Casablanca, Universal |
| "Blink" | U.V.U.K: "Blink" | Robbins Entertainment |
| "Come Together Now" | Various artists | Concord |
| "Addicted to love" | W-inds. | Pony Canyon |
| "Ayo" | 98 Degrees | Entertainment One |
| "No Part of You" | 98 Degrees | Entertainment One |
| "Take The Long Way Home" | 98 Degrees | Entertainment One |
