= Shannon Powell =

American jazz and ragtime drummer (born 1962)

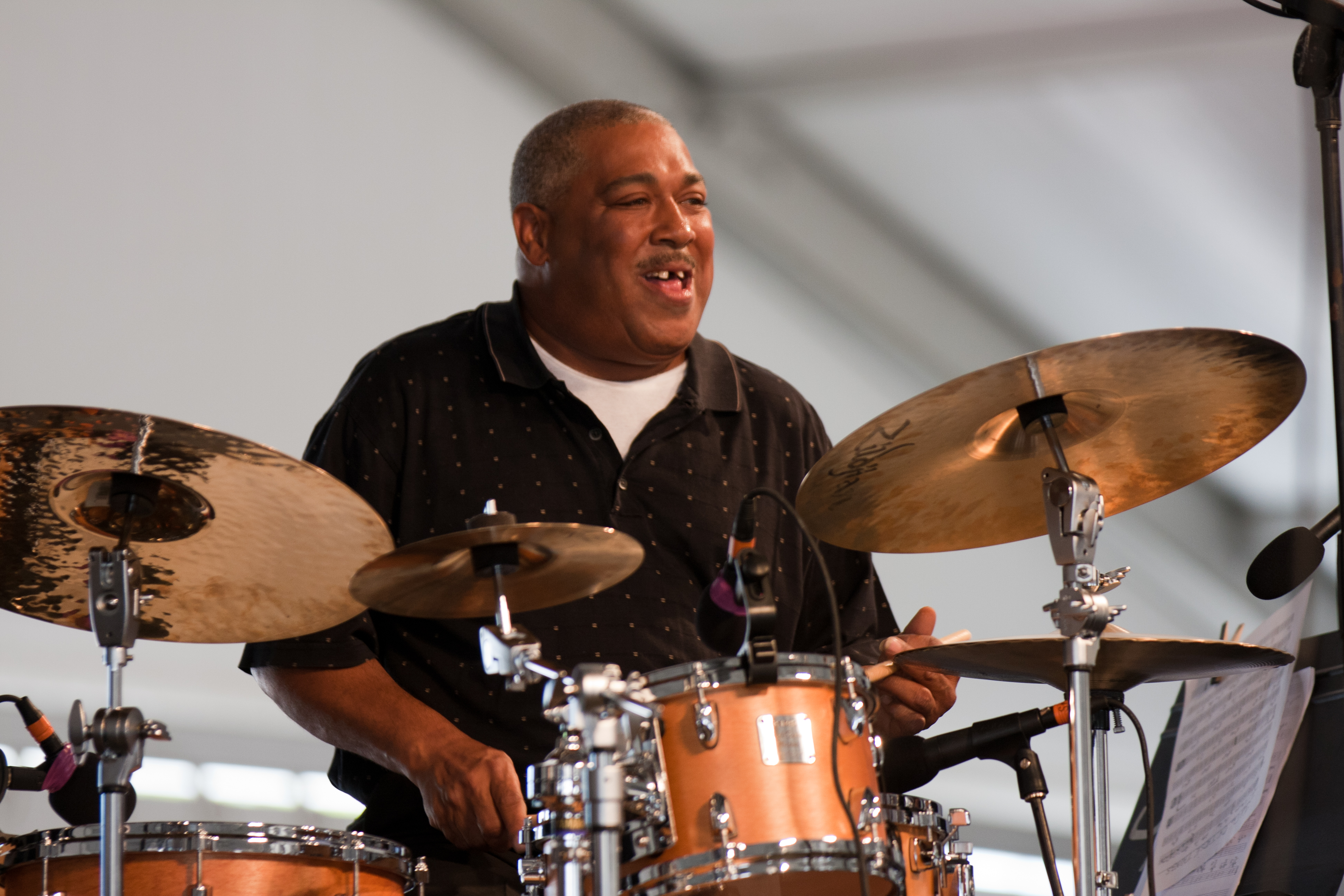
- Powell performs at JazzFest, April 29, 2011

Background information
- Born: April 8, 1962 (age 64); New Orleans, Louisiana, U.S.
- Genres: Jazz, dixieland
- Occupation: Musician
- Instrument: Drums
- Years active: 1970–present

Shannon Powell (born April 8, 1962) is an American jazz and ragtime drummer. He has toured internationally and played with Ellis Marsalis, Harry Connick, Jr., Danny Barker, Branford Marsalis, Wynton Marsalis and the Lincoln Center Jazz Orchestra, Diana Krall, Earl King, Dr. John, Preservation Hall, Marcus Roberts, John Scofield, Jason Marsalis, Leroy Jones, Nicholas Payton, and Donald Harrison Jr. Powell toured and recorded with fellow New Orleans native, Harry Connick Jr.

== Early life ==
Shannon was born and raised in the musically and culturally historic Tremé neighborhood. Adjacent to the French Quarter and now made famous by the popular HBO program of the same name, the Faubourg Tremé was once a thriving community and has been home to many famous musicians, including Alphonse Picou, George Lewis, and Kermit Ruffins.
Shannon's grandmother Veronica Batiste, played piano for silent film and in Baptist church. By age 6 he was playing drums regularly in The First Garden Christ Church.

== Danny Barker ==
The sounds of the city of New Orleans and the Tremé neighborhood played an important role in Shannon Powell's development, as did the multitude of musicians surrounding him but none more than Danny Barker. Mr. Barker asked Shannon to join the Fairview Baptist Church Marching Band with other notable musicians like, Leroy Jones, Wynton and Branford Marsalis, Dr. Michael White, Joe Torregano, Anthony "Tuba Fats" Lacen, Charles, Kirk Joseph, Gene Olufemi, and Lucien Barbarin.
Shannon's first paying gig was at Jazz Fest as a member of Danny Barker’s own band, The Jazzhounds, at the age of 14 years.

== Teens ==
In high school Powell was a member of the well-respected concert band at Joseph S. Clark High School and member of trumpeter Leroy Jones' first band, New Orleans Finest. He went on to study with pianist Willie Metcalf Jr. at the Black Academy of Arts. Like Powell's previous mentor, Metcalf asked him to join his band, again with classmates, Wynton and Branford Marsalis. Later, Shannon was an original member of the Taste of New Orleans led by tenor saxophonist, David Lastie.

== Career ==
Powell, a regular at Jazz Fest has played all over Europe and Asia in trio gigs with the likes of Ellis Marsalis, Tommy Ridgely, Johnny Adams, Kermit Ruffins, and Lillian Boutté. He now plays with the Preservation Hall Jazz Band and leads his own quartet with Jason Marsalis, Steve Masakowski, and Roland Guerin.

== Awards ==
Powell and Herlin Riley were awarded the 2010 Ascona Jazz Award from the Ascona Jazz Festival in Ascona, Switzerland.

== Film ==
Powell's interviews and performances are featured heavily in the 2011 documentary film about New Orleans musical culture, Tradition is a Temple.
