= Hurricane Brass Band =

The Hurricane Brass Band was a brass band from New Orleans, Louisiana. Established by Leroy Jones in 1974 when the Fairview Baptist Church Marching Band was disbanded, the group included Jones and Gregory Davis on trumpet, Darryl Adams on alto saxophone, and Anthony "Tuba Fats" Lacen on sousaphone. When Jones left the band to pursue a solo career, Adams took over as leader and renamed the group the Tornado Brass Band. Adams still serves as the leader of Tornado Brass Band. While some members of the band went on to form the Dirty Dozen Brass Band in 1977.

== Members ==
Members of the band included:

- Alonzo Bowens – saxophone
- Freddie Lonzo – trombone
- Gerald French – snare drum
- Katja Toivola – bass drum
- Leroy Jones – trumpet, leader
- Rob Espino – sousaphone
