= Fairview Baptist Church Marching Band =

The Fairview Baptist Church Marching Band, also known as the Fairview Baptist Church Brass Band, was the brainchild of Reverend Andrew Darby Jr., pastor of Fairview Baptist Church. The band was created in 1970 after Mr. Danny Barker became a member of Fairview Baptist Church. When Mr. Barker became a member, he asked Reverend Darby what he wanted him to do in the church. Reverend Darby asked him to enlist young people in the church and in the neighborhood who played instruments and work with them as an instrumental group (band). Reverend Darby told Mr. Barker that there was a critical need to produce young musicians to carry on the rich tradition of music in New Orleans in order to ‘replenish the stock’ as adult musicians grew older. Under the leadership of Pastor Darby, Mr. Barker agreed. Thus, the tradition, would live on and on.

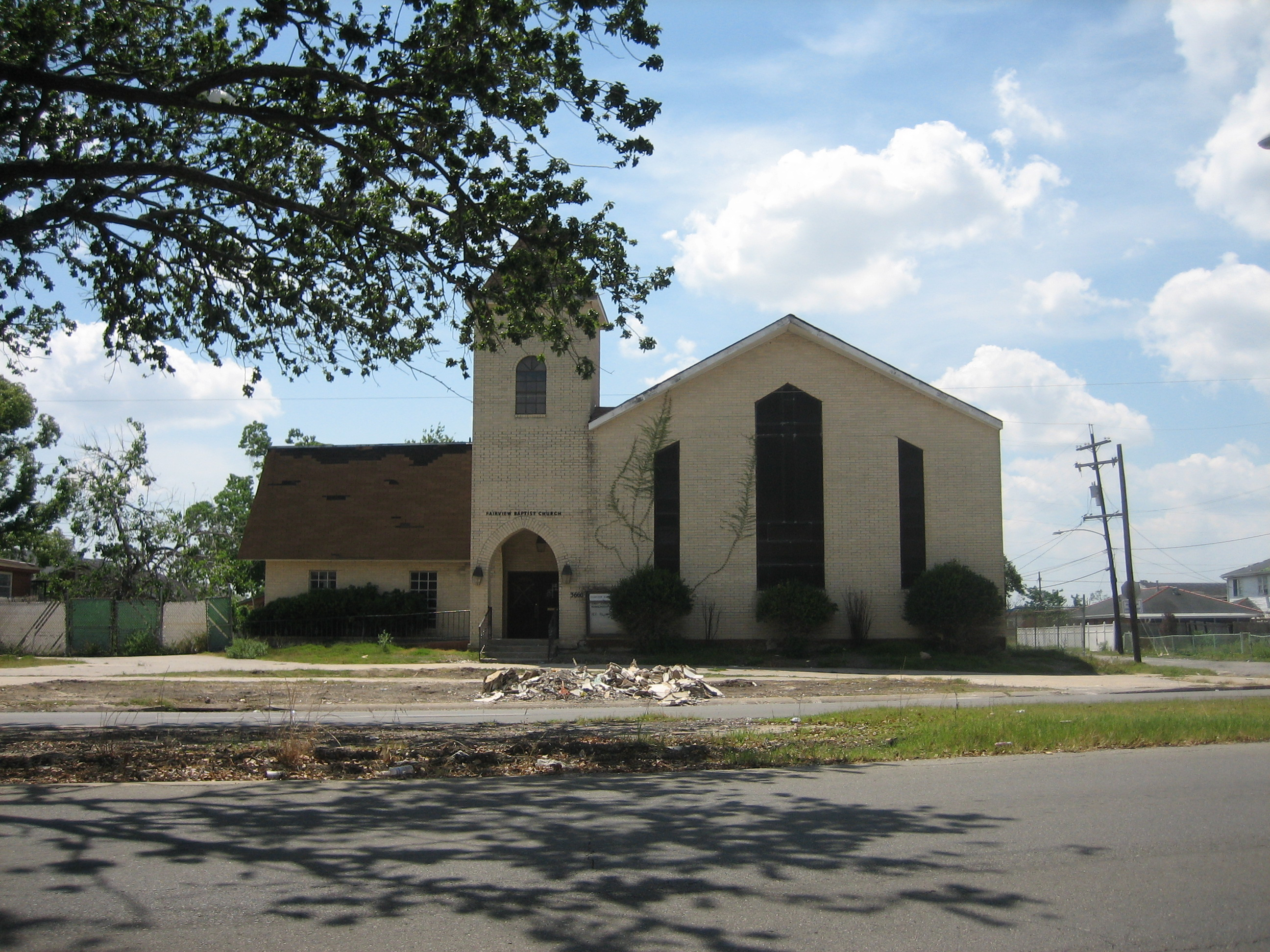
Fairview Baptist Church

The group of young musicians was organized in 1970 by banjo and guitar player Danny Barker. Based out of the Fairview Baptist Church in New Orleans, Louisiana and led in performance by trumpeter Leroy Jones (who was twelve when Barker recruited him), the band gained considerable popularity in New Orleans and became a regular feature on the city's music scene. In 1974 union musicians in New Orleans protested that Barker's use of non-union youngsters to fill the ranks of his band was exploitative, and forced him to disband the group or lose his own union membership. Barker withdrew, but the group immediately reformed as the Hurricane Brass Band, under the direction of the newly unionized Jones; members of the Hurricane band went on to form the Dirty Dozen Brass Band in 1977.

Notable alumni of the Fairview Baptist Church Marching Band include Jones, Wynton and Branford Marsalis, Dr. Michael White, Herlin Riley, Gregg Stafford, Joe Torregano, Anthony "Tuba Fats" Lacen, Charles Joseph, Kirk Joseph, Lucien Barbarin, Gene Olufemi, Shannon Powell, and Darryl "Lil Jazz" Adams.
