= Danny Barker =

American jazz musician (1909–1994)

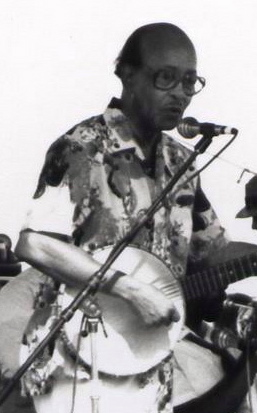
- Barker performing in 1990

Background information
- Born: January 13, 1909; New Orleans, Louisiana, U.S.
- Died: March 13, 1994 (aged 85) New Orleans, U.S.
- Genres: Jazz, blues, zydeco
- Occupations: Musician, vocalist
- Instruments: Vocals, guitar, banjo, ukulele

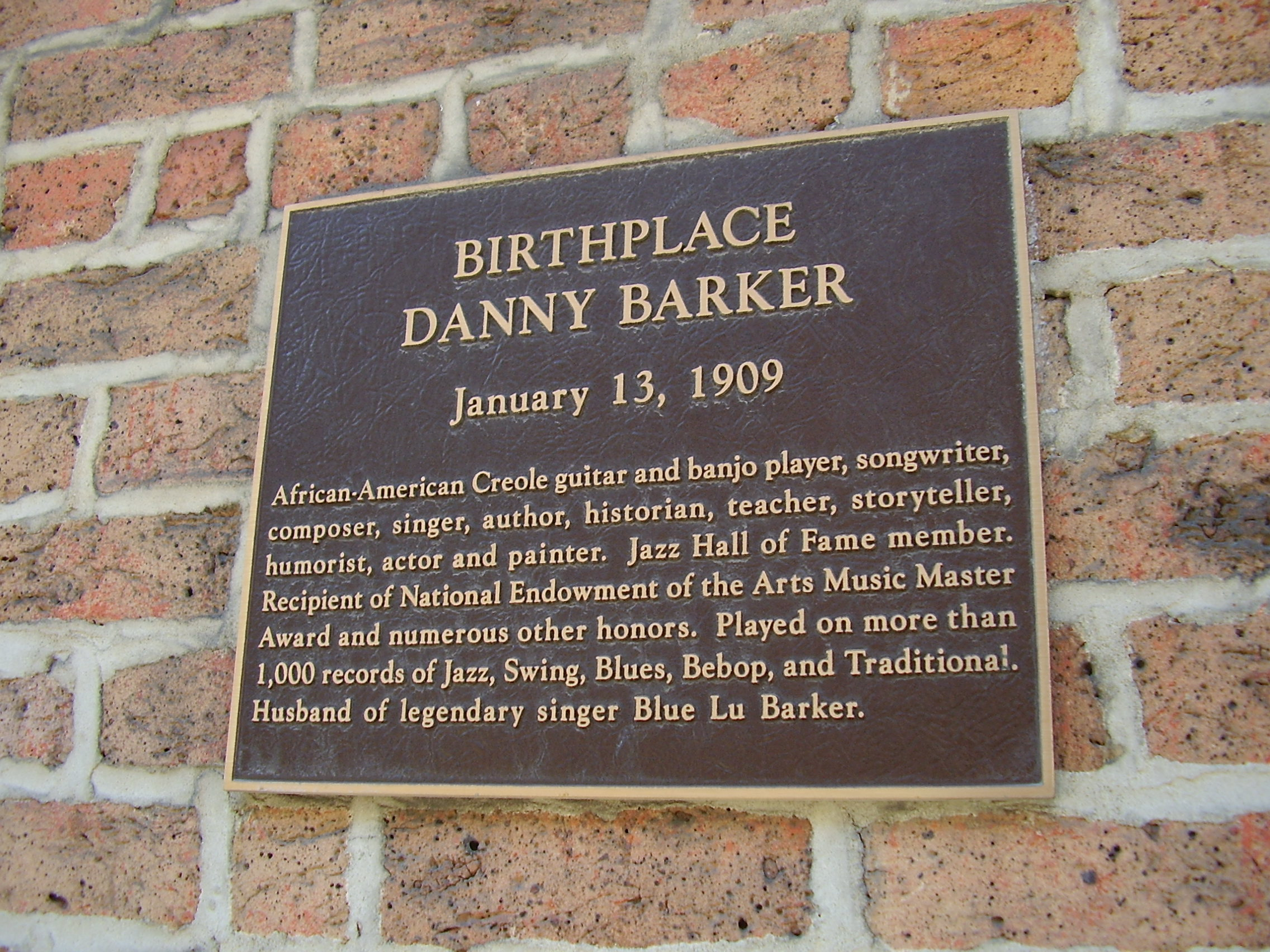
Sign indicating Barker's birthplace

Daniel Moses Barker (January 13, 1909 – March 13, 1994) was an American jazz musician, vocalist, and author from New Orleans. He was a rhythm guitarist for Cab Calloway, Lucky Millinder and Benny Carter during the 1930s.

One of Barker's earliest teachers in New Orleans was fellow banjoist Emanuel Sayles, with whom he recorded. Throughout his career, he played with Jelly Roll Morton, Baby Dodds, James P. Johnson, Sidney Bechet, Mezz Mezzrow, and Red Allen. He also toured and recorded with his wife, singer Blue Lu Barker. From the 1960s, Barker's work with the Fairview Baptist Church Brass Band was pivotal in ensuring the longevity of jazz in New Orleans, producing generations of new talent, including Wynton and Branford Marsalis who played in the band as youths.

== Biography ==
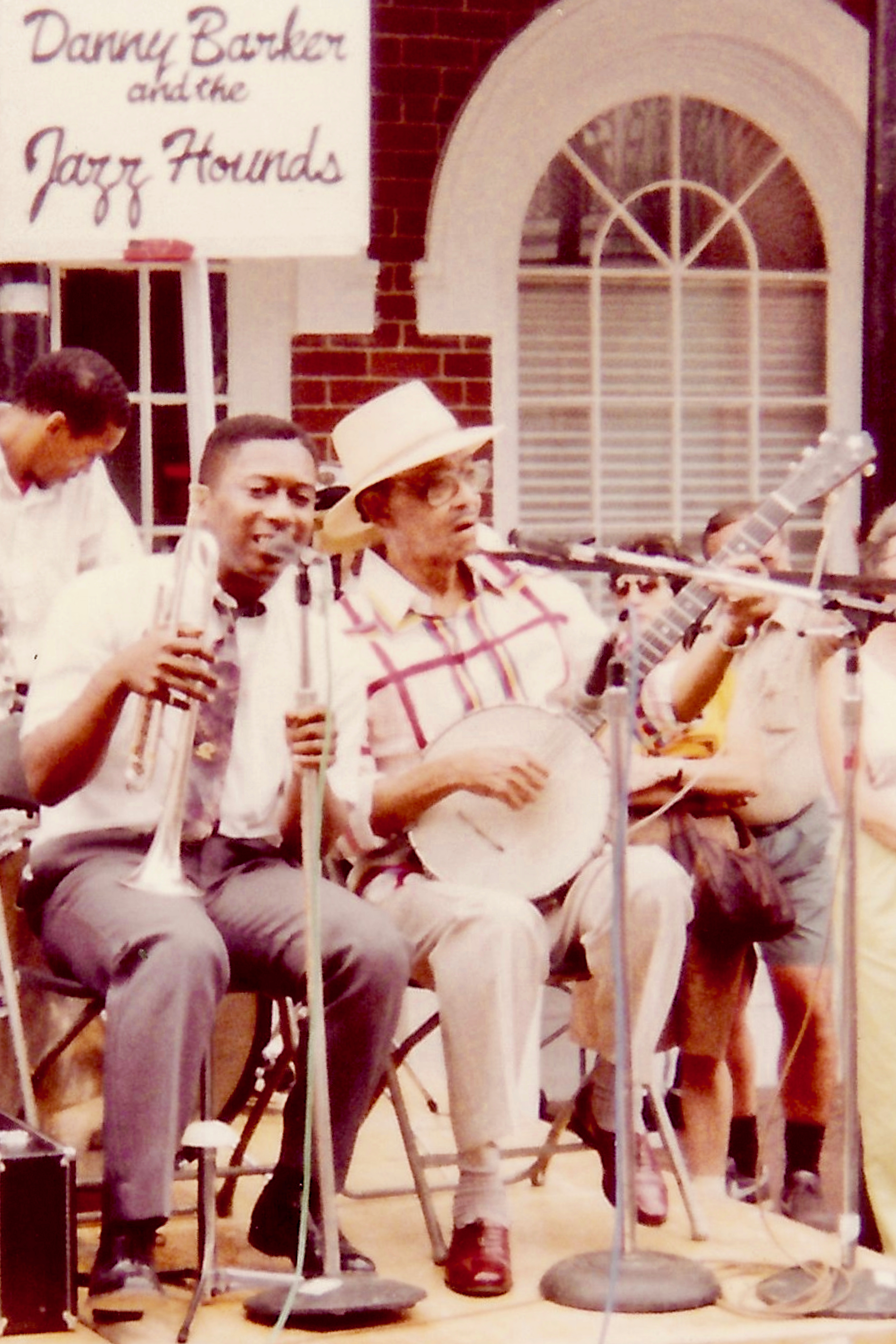
Jazz musicians Kermit Ruffins and Danny Barker (right), French Quarter Festival

Danny Barker was born to a family of musicians in New Orleans in 1909, the grandson of bandleader Isidore Barbarin and nephew of drummers Paul Barbarin and Louis Barbarin. He took up clarinet and drums before switching to a ukulele that his aunt got him, and then a banjo from his uncle or a trumpeter named Lee Collins.

Barker began his career as a musician in his youth with his streetband the Boozan Kings, and also toured Mississippi with Little Brother Montgomery. In 1930, he moved to New York City and switched to the guitar. On the day of his arrival in New York, his uncle Paul took him to the Rhythm Club, where he saw an inspiring performance by McKinney's Cotton Pickers. It was their first performance in New York as a band.

Barker played with several acts when he moved to New York, including Fess Williams, Billy Fowler and the White Brothers. He worked with Buddy Harris in 1933, Albert Nicholas in 1935, Lucky Millinder from 1937 to 1938, and Benny Carter in 1938. During his time in New York, he frequently played with West Indian musicians, who often mistook him for one of them due to his Creole style of playing.

From 1939 to 1946, he frequently recorded with Cab Calloway, and started his own group featuring his wife Blue Lu Barker after leaving Calloway. On September 4, 1945, he recorded with Ohio's native jazz pianist, Sir Charles Thompson, and saxophonists Dexter Gordon and Charlie Parker. In 1947, he was performing again with Lucky Millinder, and also with Bunk Johnson. He returned to working with Albert Nicholas in 1948 and in 1949 rejoined efforts with his wife in a group.

During the 1950s, he was primarily a freelance musician, but worked with Paul Barbarin from 1954 to 1955. In the mid-1950s he went to California to record again with Albert Nicholas. He performed at the 1960 Newport Jazz Festival with Eubie Blake. In 1963 he was working with Cliff Jackson, and then in 1964 appeared at the World Fair leading his own group. Sometime in the early 1960s, he formed a group he called Cinderella.

In 1965, Barker returned to New Orleans and took up a position as assistant to the curator of the New Orleans Jazz Museum. In 1970, he founded and led a church-sponsored brass band for young people—the Fairview Baptist Church Marching Band. Reverend Andrew Darby, Jr., the Pastor of Fairview Baptist Church commissioned 'Brother' Barker to form a Christian band, and Barker went throughout the neighborhood of the church enlisting young musicians. The Fairview band launched the careers of musicians who performed in brass band and mainstream jazz contexts, including Wynton Marsalis, Branford Marsalis, Leroy Jones, Kirk Joseph, Nicholas Payton, Shannon Powell, Lucien Barbarin, and Dr. Michael White, among others. As Joe Torregano—another Fairview band alumnus—described it, "That group saved jazz for a generation in New Orleans."

...I had certain teachers that really inspired me, like Danny Barker, and John Longo.

— Wynton Marsalis

In later years the band became known as the Dirty Dozen Brass Band. During that time, he also led the French Market Jazz Band.

It was the earnest and general feeling that any Negro who... entered the hell-hole called the state of Mississippi for any reason other than to attend the funeral of a very close relative... was well on the way to losing his mentality, or had already lost it.

— Danny Barker in reference to touring with Little Brother Montgomery in Mississippi quoted in Escaping the Delta by Elijah Wald

Barker played regularly at many New Orleans venues from the late 1960s through the early 1990s, in addition to touring. During the 1994 Mardi Gras season, Barker reigned as King of Krewe du Vieux. He also published an autobiography and many articles on New Orleans and jazz history.

Barker composed a number of songs, some of which other New Orleans bands perform regularly into the 21st century. His sexually suggestive song lyrics include "Palm Court Strut" and "Stick It Where You Stuck It Last Night".

Barker wrote and had published two books on jazz from the Oxford University Press. The first was Bourbon Street Black, cowritten with Dr. Jack V. Buerkle, in 1973, which was followed by A Life In Jazz in 1986. He also enjoyed painting and was an amateur landscape artist.

Living during a period when segregation was still common practice in the United States, Barker faced many obstacles during his career. Barker suffered from diabetes throughout most of his adult life, and was often in poor health. He died of cancer in New Orleans on 13 March 1994 at age 85. He was buried from St. Raymond Catholic Church in New Orleans.

== Personal life ==
Barker was raised Baptist and Catholic.

== Film ==
Barker is featured posthumously in the 2011 non-fiction film by Darren Hoffman, Tradition is a Temple. Musicians from the documentary speak at length of the profound impact that Barker had on their lives and careers and New Orleans poet Chuck Perkins reads a poem written for and dedicated to his memory. In 1957 Barker appeared in the CBS TV program The Sound of Jazz, performing with Red Allen, Pee Wee Russell, Coleman Hawkins and others. Barker appears in Les Blank's New Orleans documentary Always for Pleasure, including an interview (with Blue Lu) and several performance sequences. Barker also appeared in the 1987 American television drama film A Gathering of Old Men, in which he played the role of Chimlee.

== Discography ==
Year	Album	Leader	Label
1945	Charlie Parker: Every Bit of It 1945	Charles Thompson	Spotlite
1947	Creole Reeds	Sidney Bechet	Riverside
1947	My Indian Red	Danny Barker	King Zulu
1955	Paul Barbarin and His New Orleans Jazz	Paul Barbarin	Atlantic
1957	Broadcast Performances, Vol. 3: Radio and TV Broadcasts (1956–1958)	Billie Holiday	ESP-Disk
1958	Mainstream	Vic Dickenson	Atlantic
1958	LaVern Baker Sings Bessie Smith	Phil Moore	Atlantic
1959	A Girl and Her Guitar	Mary Osborne	Apollo
1960	Ham and Eggs / Liza Little Liza Jane	Leroy Parkins	Bethlehem
1961	Things Ain't What They Used to Be	Al Sears	Swingville
1988	Save the Bones	Danny Barker	Orleans

== Awards ==
- 1994 - Big Easy Entertainment Awards - Best Traditional Jazz Group for Danny Barker
- 1993 - Big Easy Entertainment Awards - Lifetime Achievement In Music
- 1993 - Big Easy Entertainment Awards - Best Traditional Jazz Group for Danny Barker
- 1991 - National Endowment for the Arts (NEA) NEA Jazz Masters Award
- 1991 - Big Easy Entertainment Awards - Best Traditional Jazz Group for Danny Barker
- 1990 - Big Easy Entertainment Awards - Best Traditional Jazz Group for Danny Barker and the Jazz Hounds
- 1989 - Big Easy Entertainment Awards - Best Traditional Jazz Group for Danny Barker and the Jazz Hounds with Blue Lu Barker

== See also ==
- List of people from New Orleans
