= Lacen =

Lacen or Lačen is a surname. Notable people with the surname include:

- Anthony Lacen (1950–2004), American musician
- Medhi Lacen (born 1984), Algerian footballer
- Nataša Lačen (born 1971), Slovene cross country skier
