= Treme =

Treme or Tremé may refer to:

- Tremé, a historic neighborhood of New Orleans, Louisiana, US
- Treme (TV series), an American series set in New Orleans
