= Stewart Butler =

American LGBTQ activist (1930–2020)

- Born: August 21, 1930; Mobile, Alabama
- Died: March 5, 2020 (aged 89); Baton Rouge, Louisiana
- Education: University of Alaska
- Occupation: Activist
- Years active: 1978-2020

Stewart Butler (August 21, 1930 - March 5, 2020) was an American gay rights activist mostly active in Louisiana. His home in New Orleans, affectionately known as the "Faerie Playhouse", was an important gathering place for members of the LGBTQ community.

== Early life and education ==
Butler was born on August 21, 1930, in Mobile, Alabama. He had a sister. He grew up in Louisiana, attending high school in Baton Rouge. For part of his childhood, Butler lived in the Carville National Leprosarium, where his father worked. After high school Butler briefly attended Louisiana State University but left to join the United States Army. He eventually graduated from the University of Alaska in 1958.

== Activism ==
Butler's first involvement with activism came during his time at the University of Alaska, where he became active in the Alaskan statehood movement. He was elected to the territorial legislature of Alaska, but Alaska was granted statehood before Butler could take office. After Alaska became a state, Butler moved to San Francisco before settling in New Orleans. In 1973, Butler narrowly missed the UpStairs Lounge arson attack, which killed 32 visitors to a gay bar in New Orleans. He became a full-time activist in 1978 and, along with his partner Alfred Doolittle, converted their home into an organizing hub that they called the "Faerie Playhouse." Butler's activism was enabled by Doolittle, who had inherited a significant amount of money from his parents. Butler was a founding member of the Louisiana Lesbian and Gay Political Action Caucus (LAGPAC), managing the group's members and political campaign strategy.

In the 1980s, Butler began advocating for New Orleans to formally ban discrimination on the basis of sexual orientation. The ordinance first went up for a vote in 1984, when council members deadlocked and could not break a tie. In 1986, the ordinance failed by a 4–3 vote. It eventually passed in 1991 with a 5–2 vote. During Pope John Paul II's visit to the United States in 1987, Butler organized a protest against hin for his failure to meet with AIDS patients. Throughout the 1990s, Butler advocated strongly for transgender rights, encouraging PFLAG's New Orleans chapter to include transgender people in their advocacy, an inclusion that made its way to the national organization in 1998.

In 2012, Butler was a co-founder for the LGBT+ Archives Project of Louisiana.

Butler also advocated for liberal causes more generally, including criminal justice reform and marijuana legalization.

== Personal life, death and legacy ==
Butler was initially married to a woman, however, the two divorced after just a year of marriage. Butler met his partner Alfred Doolittle in 1973. The two met at Cafe Lafitte in Exile, a prominent gay bar in New Orleans. Doolittle died in 2008.

Butler died on March 5, 2020, in Baton Rouge. His papers have been held by the Louisiana Research Collection at Tulane University since 2018. In 2022, the book Political Animal, written by Frank Perez, about Butler's life was published by the University Press of Mississippi.
