= Katja Toivola =

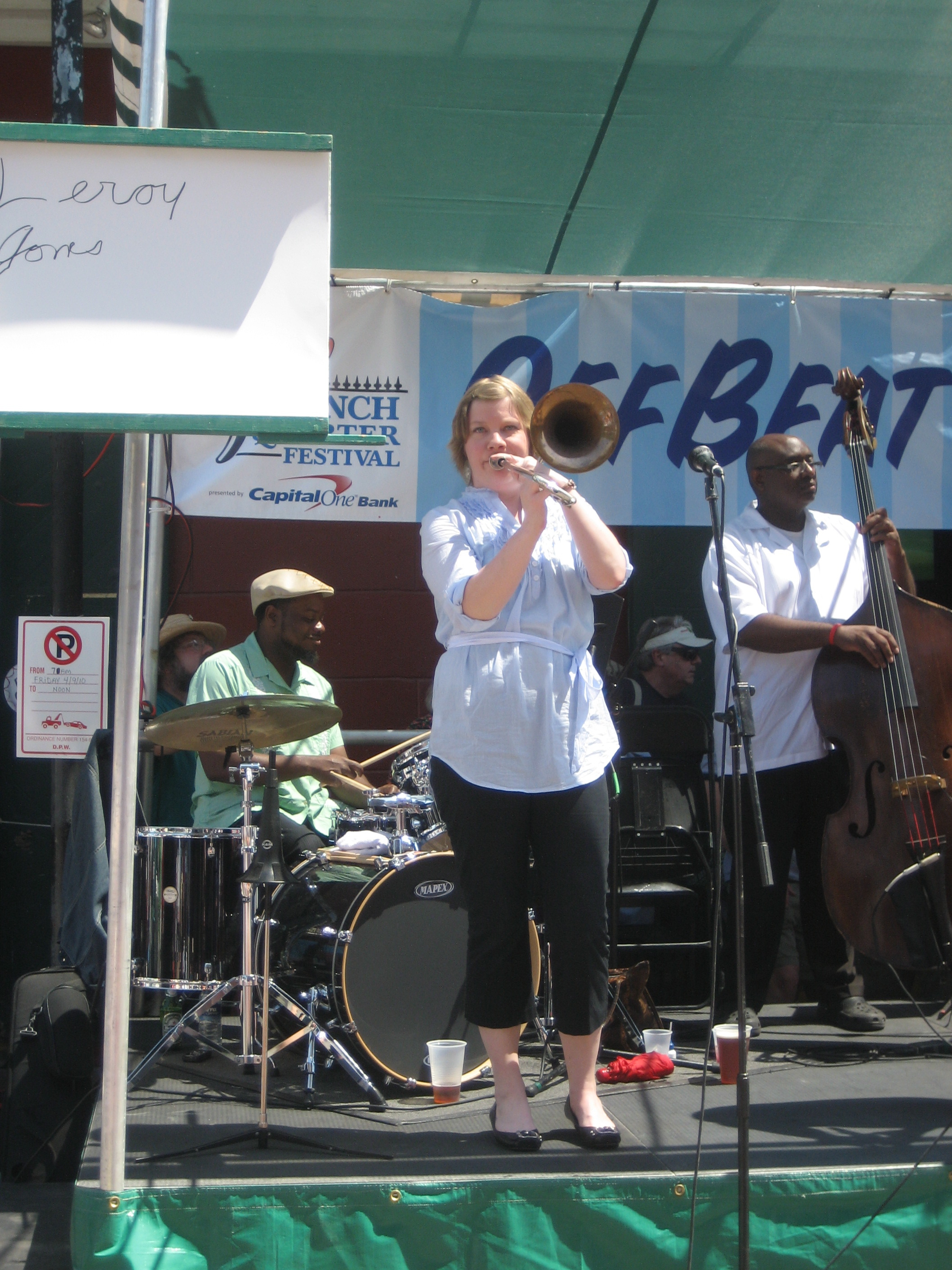

Background information
- Born: Katja Aili Maria Toivola; October 27, 1975 (age 51); Helsinki, Finland
- Genre: Jazz
- Occupation: Musician
- Instruments: Trombone, bass drum
- Years active: 1997–present

Katja Aili Maria Toivola (born October 27, 1975) is a Finnish trombonist. She is the first female trombone player to play regularly at Preservation Hall in New Orleans. She also plays the bass drum and works as a graphic designer and photographer.

== Early life ==
Toivola grew up in Helsinki and attended the Lycée franco-finlandais d'Helsinki, and graduated from its high school in 1994. After that she studied Romance philology and ethnomusicology at the University of Helsinki. She wrote her master's thesis on the ReBirth Brass Band of New Orleans and received a grant for a field trip from the Finnish Cultural Foundation in 2003. The title of the thesis was Feel Like Funkin' It Up – A Study on the New Orleans Jazz Band called ReBirth Brass Band. Toivola graduated from the university in 2005.

Toivola played the piano from the age four on, but she never was excited about that instrument or the material she had to play. "To the disappointment of my teacher, I could never get excited about the theory behind the piano playing, but the music itself had the effect on me that with guts I learned the pieces by heart, slowly but surely." Toivola discovered jazz in the early 1990s, when he mother took her to a jazz festival.

For some reason my mother got the idea of taking me to the Classic Jazz Festival [in Helsinki] in 1991, to its concerts and jam sessions. I was struck by traditional jazz there, and I've never been able to shake it off since then. I feel that jazz is my thing.

After this, she would listen to jazz music, but she did not play it. For some time she had an alto saxophone, but she was not destined to play it for long:

In fact I first played the alto saxophone, as I liked its sound and its feel. After that I dreamed about either the trumpet or the trombone. I got the impetus to play the trombone, when I was at a music camp at Otava folk high school, and Ilkka Vento was kind enough to lend me his instrument. When I was able to produce a sound with it, I decided to go on and learn to play it.

== Career as a musician ==
Even at a young age, Toivola knew some musicians and was able to join a band in Helsinki. Then she met some musicians from New Orleans, visiting Helsinki, and they encouraged her to visit their city. When she got there, she went around with her trombone and was given a chance to jam and to get to know the music circles there.

The jamming culture in New Orleans is different from that of Finland. When the musicians here see that you have an instrument, you can usually get to play in at least one song. If you suck, that's it then. But if you can play, you can go on playing. — I carried my trombone around and was given invitations to play.

Toivola visited New Orleans for the first time in 1995, and she has lived there since 2004. She found her husband, trumpet player Leroy Jones there, and they have been a couple since 1997 and married since 2016.

In the early days Toivola and Jones experienced a setback, when Hurricane Katrina hit the city. The damage that ensued was caused not so much by the hurricane itself but by the fact that the levees built to protect the city failed one after another. Water rose in the flat Toivola and Jones had rented to about four feet, which meant that almost all of their possessions were destroyed. However, the place was cleaned up, and the things that were ruined were thrown away. Luckily the music scene quickly picked up, and they started to get invitation to play gigs. Musicians were the first people to return to the city after the hurricane. Toivola appeared in the American television drama series Treme, during its second season in episode eight entitled "Can I Change My Mind?" She has performed at the Preservation Hall in her husband's band. She returns to Finland a couple of times a year, and then she plays in the bands Spirit of New Orleans (SONO) and New Orleans Helsinki Connection. SONO has played abroad Fiji and New Zealand, as well jazz festivals in Europe and Scandinavia. New Orleans Helsinki Connection has played twice on New Orleans's JazzFest.

== Research ==
- "New Orleansin brass band -musiikin suosion kasvu 1960-luvulta tähän päivään." ('The growth of the popularity of New Orleans brass band music from the 1960s to the present.') Seminar paper in ethnomusicology. (In Finnish.)
- "Rebirth Brass Bandin Do whatcha wanna -kappaleen rakenneanalyysi." 2002. ('A structural analysis of the song Do whatcha wanna by Rebirth Brass Band.') Seminar paper in ethnomusicology. (In Finnish.)
- Feel like funkin' it up: tutkielma New Orleansin jazzia soittavasta Rebirth Brass Bandistä. 2003. ('Feel like funkin' it up: A Study on the New Orleansin Jazz Band Rebirth Brass Band'.) (In Finnish.) A master's thesis in ethonomusicology.) Pdf version the e-thesis –service of Helsinki University

== Discography ==
With Spirit of New Orleans

- 2002 Bogalusa Strut
- 2006 Some of These Days
- 2009 Mahogany Hall Stomp

With New Orleans Helsinki Connection

- 2004 At Last
- 2012 Paradise On Earth

=== As guest ===
- 2005 Leroy Jones, Memories of the Fairview & Hurricane Band
- 2012 Leroy Jones, Go to the Mardi Gras
- 2004 Susanna Mesiä, Susanna Mesiä trad
- 2012 Original Hurricane Brass Band, We Shall Not Be Moved
- 1997 Riverside Rascals, Riverside Rascals featuring Tricia Boutté
