= Lafitte Projects =

Faubourg Lafitte Housing Development Lafitte Projects
- New Orleans Neighborhood
- Interactive map of Faubourg Lafitte Housing Development
- Coordinates: 29°57′56.7″N 90°04′37.7″W
- Country: United States
- State: Louisiana
- City: New Orleans
- Planning District: District 1, Treme

Area
  - Total: 0.30 sq mi (0.78 km^{2})
  - Land: 0.30 sq mi (0.78 km^{2})
  - Water: 0.00 sq mi (0 km^{2})
- Elevation: 0 ft (0 m)

Population (2010)
  - Total: 379
  - Density: 1,300/sq mi (490/km^{2})
- Time zone: UTC-6 (CST)
  - Summer (DST): UTC-5 (CDT)
- Area code: 504

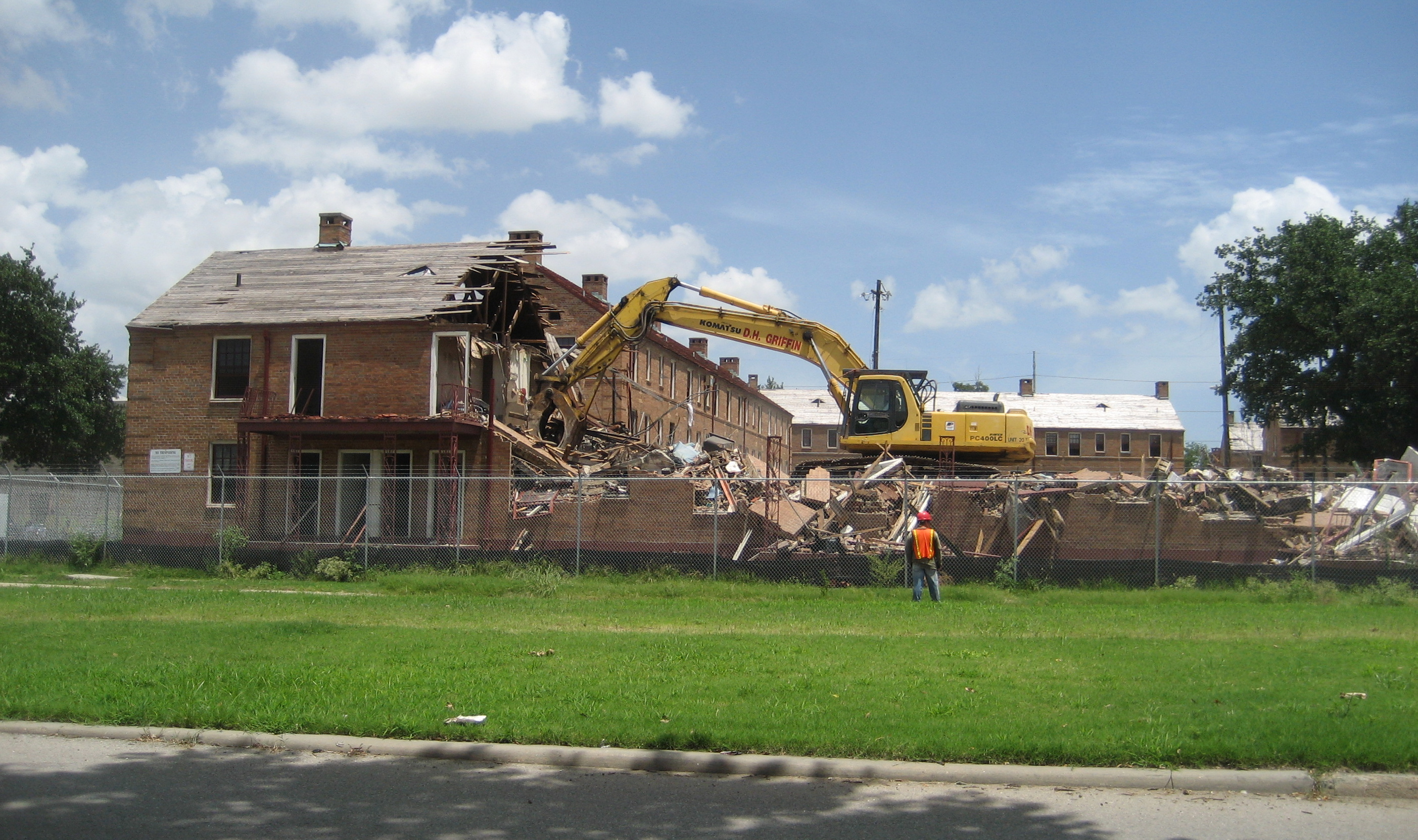
Demolition work ongoing at the Lafitte Projects, July 2008

The Lafitte Projects were one of the Housing Projects of New Orleans and were located in the 6th Ward of New Orleans Treme neighborhood. It was one of downtown New Orleans' oldest housing developments and had many associated problems before being severely flooded and damaged during Hurricane Katrina in 2005. The project made national headlines after the gruesome murder of Thomas May who burned to death in the project in 1994. By a Department of Housing and Urban Development (HUD) decree, the projects were demolished and redeveloped as affordable, mixed-income housing. The redevelopment effort was charged with replacing every demolished unit. The large housing project was left mostly vacant following evacuations after the extensive flooding from Hurricane Katrina. Heated arguments have surrounded the demolition of the project, as some longtime residents wanted them renovated.

== History ==
Lafitte was constructed in 1940 and opened in August 1941 with 896 units housing 3,000 tenants. It was one of the first housing projects for African Americans in Louisiana. During its early years, it was labeled as the largest and finest U.S. Housing Authority low-rent project in the South. Lafitte was the fifth of six local housing projects to be built in New Orleans. In the 1980s, the project began to rapidly decline as crack-cocaine flooded Treme. Living conditions also became a problem as well as crime. Drug dealing and shootings became common in the development. It became one of many New Orleans housing projects riddled with violence and murder. After Hurricane Katrina, the project was in stable condition but remained closed and later demolished in 2008.

The first phase of the development plan included 134 on-site affordable rental units completed in December 2010 and 47 on-site affordable homeownership units to be completed by March 2011. The overall Lafitte community will be constructed around existing schools, emphasizing education as the bedrock of the neighborhood. The redevelopment restored the historical street grid that was erased when the original housing development was built. The restoration will integrate the new buildings and residents into the city and provide for easier access to the surrounding areas. It will reconnect residents to essential supportive services, particularly those now offered at the reopened Sojourner Truth Community Center.

=== 1994 murder of Thomas May ===
In August 1994, 22-year old David Williams burned a man to death in front of residents in Lafitte. Mr. Williams handcuffed a man Thomas May and doused him with gasoline and set him on fire in the courtyard of the project. Over 20 residents witnessed the murder but were too afraid to intervene.
