= Faerie Playhouse =

LGBTQ museum in New Orleans, Louisiana, US

The Faerie Playhouse
- The playhouse in 2007

General information
- Type: History museum
- Architectural style: Creole
- Location: 1308 Esplanade Avenue, New Orleans, Louisiana, U.S.
- Coordinates: 29°58′03″N 90°03′59″W
- Completed: 1844

Website
- www.faerieplayhouse.org

Faerie Playhouse is a historic Creole cottage and LGBTQ history museum in the Tremé on Esplanade Avenue in New Orleans, Louisiana. The cottage was the former residence of gay rights activists Stewart Butler and Alfred Doolittle. The grounds include a memorial garden, containing the cremated remains of various LGBTQ activists.

== History ==
The cottage, built in the Creole style in 1844, was originally part of the Plauché Plantation. It is the last remaining of four identical buildings called the Passebon Row cottages. The first owner of the home was a Black freewoman named Athalie Drouillard.

The home passed through multiple owners after Drouillard, including the gay couple Stewart Butler and Alfred Doolittle. Funded by Doolittle's inheritance, the couple became prominent gay rights activists in the 1970s and converted the home into an organizing hub and meeting place for gay activists, which they named the "Faeirie Playhouse", in 1979. The playhouse became the meeting place for a group of LGBTQ friends who called themselves "The Family", of which many members were involved in the late 20th and early 21st century LGBTQ activism in the city.

Doolittle and Butler operated the grounds as a small farm and orchard, growing plantains, cotton, avocados, sugar cane, peppers, potatoes, kumquats, limes, grapes, and pears. They also operated a guest house, a bird refuge housing sparrows, cardinals, blue jays, pigeons, hummingbirds, crows, and bumble bees, and a wildlife refuge and animal rescue for squirrels, mice, rats, geckos, turtles, cats, and dogs. The couple's home also housed a winery and art gallery. They operated a wedding chapel, spa, and youth refuge from their home as well.

The Memorial Garden in 2022

The house derived its name, Faerie Playhouse, from a play performed there on June 20, 1992, by a few dozen people in honor of Doolittle's 56th birthday. It was the only production of Peter Puck, an original play by Doolittle starring Lenny Frank, Karl Ezkovich, Rich Magill, and John Foster, with Stewart as the narrator.

=== Memorial Garden ===
Their backyard garden became a memorial garden, containing the cremated remains of nearly two dozen people, many who were involved in LGBTQ activism or who died during the HIV/AIDS crisis. Notable burials include Charlene Schneider, John Ognibene, Carlos Clifton Howard Jr., Otis Fennell, and J.B. Harter.
