= Doreen Ketchens =

American jazz clarinetist (born 1966)

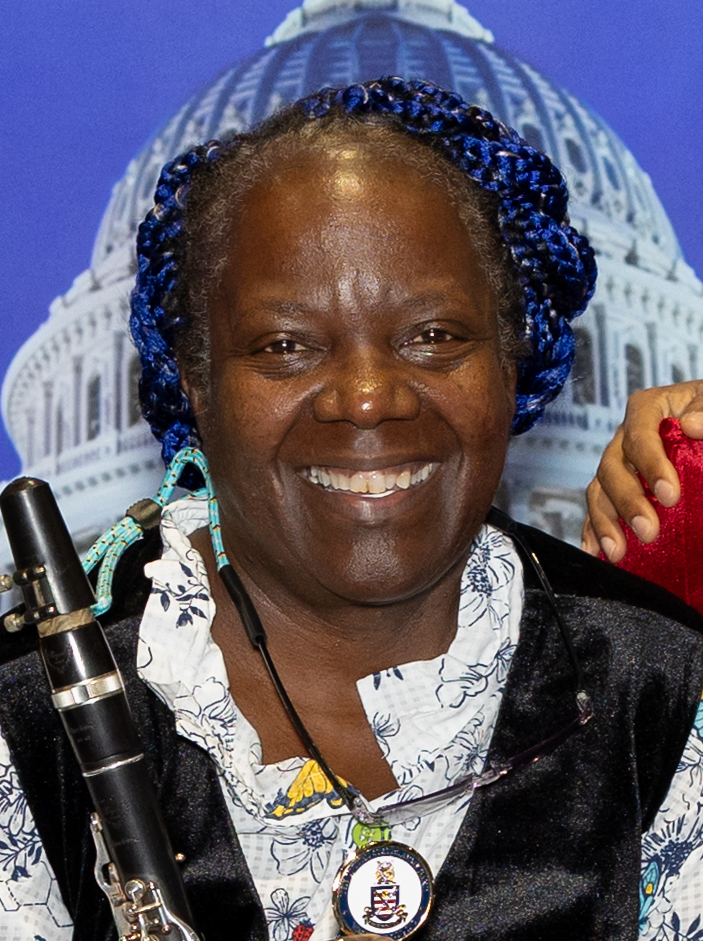
- Ketchens in 2025

Background information
- Also known as: "Lady Louis" "The Clarinet Queen" "Ms. New Orleans"
- Born: Doreen Joseph; October 3, 1966 (age 59); New Orleans, Louisiana, U.S.
- Genres: Jazz; Dixieland
- Occupations: Musician bandleader educator
- Instrument: Clarinet
- Labels: DJNO Records
- Website: https://www.doreensjazz.org

Doreen J. Ketchens (born October 3, 1966) is an American jazz clarinetist who performs Dixieland and trad jazz. She has performed at concert halls, music festivals, and U.S. embassies, as well as in decades of weekly performances in Dixieland's tradition in the Royal Street Performing Arts Zone in the French Quarter of New Orleans with her band, Doreen's Jazz New Orleans. Ketchens has performed for four U.S. presidents– Bill Clinton, George H. W. Bush, Ronald Reagan, and Jimmy Carter– and was described by Nola.com in 2012 as a cultural ambassador of New Orleans.

Nicknamed "Lady Louis" because of her ability to hit and hold powerful high notes, and her love of Louis Armstrong's performance style, she has performed with Ellis Marsalis, Jon Faddis, Trombone Shorty, Al Hirt, Dorothy Donegan, the Black Crowes, and Jennifer Warnes, opened for Macy Gray and Dr. John, and has been seen around the world by millions of people via media and fan videos of her performances. She has been featured in numerous documentaries about New Orleans, its music, and its heritage, and she has been seen on television in shows like HBO's Treme.

== Origins and education ==
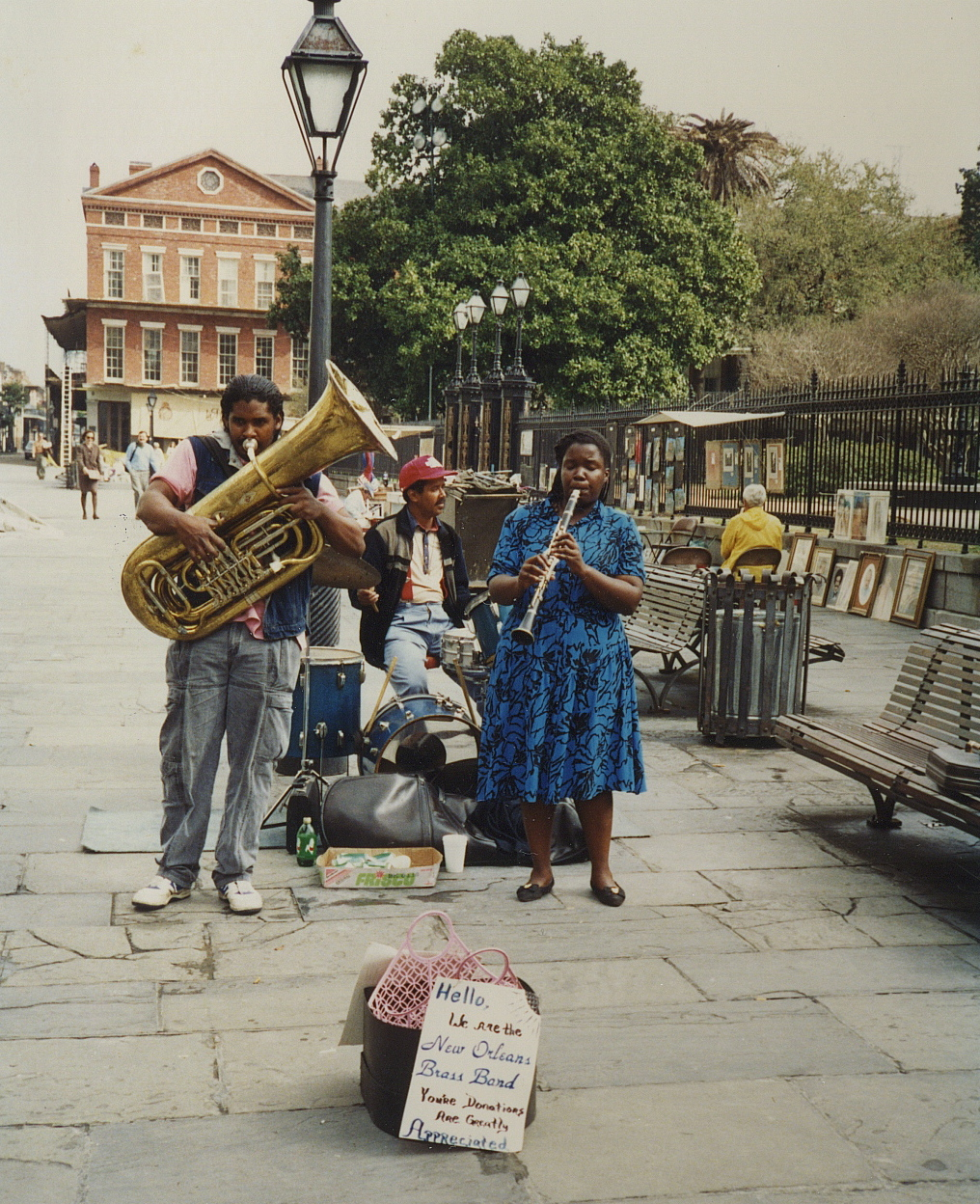
Lawrence and Doreen Ketchens busking in Jackson Square, New Orleans in the early 1990s

Like many of New Orleans' musicians, Ketchens grew up in the Tremé. She studied clarinet in elementary school, beginning as a fifth-grader at Joseph Craig Elementary. To get out of a pop quiz, she responded to an announcement asking interested students to come and sign up for the band. Her first choice was flute, but most of the girls picked that instrument, so she opted for the clarinet. In junior high school, her band director, Donald Richardson, encouraged her to practice. Concurrently, there was a boy that she was trying to impress. When she finally did practice, her talent began to emerge. She played for John F. Kennedy High School in New Orleans, and auditioned and was accepted to NOCCA, Louisiana's Arts Conservatory in New Orleans. She began to study with clarinetist Stanley Weinstein.

Doreen attended Delgado Community College, Loyola University of New Orleans, Southern University In New Orleans, and, through scholarships, including one from the New York Philharmonic, University of Hartford's The Hartt School in Hartford, Connecticut, where she studied under Henry Larsen. She had an internship with the symphony orchestra in Hartford.

She worked her way through conservatories and college as a chef, and met her husband, arranger and sousaphonist for Doreen's Jazz New Orleans, Lawrence Ketchens (1963-2025) at Loyola. She found her passion in Jazz with Lawrence and the two regularly performed together.

== Career ==
Ketchens performed her first jazz gig with Lawrence at the 1988 Republican National Convention. She ran a plate lunch eatery called "Doreen's Sweets" for a time until she and Lawrence kept passing musicians working the streets of New Orleans, and she told him that they could make money doing that. The couple began performing on the streets of New Orleans in 1987.

She began playing in Jackson Square with her first band, the Jackson Square All-Stars. Their band evolved into "Doreen's Jazz New Orleans," and, after much struggle with the chauvinism of traditional Jazz and club owners, they managed to find a winning formula playing and entertaining crowds via their street shows, Jazz festivals, and then, through direct sales of their music and videos on the Internet. Ketchens has been sharing traditional American Jazz in Africa, Asia, Canada, Europe, South America, Russia and the United States. They have performed with programs sponsored by Jazz at Lincoln Center and The US Department of State.

Doreen introduced her daughter, Dorian Ketchens-Dixon, when she was nine, as a drummer at the New Orleans Jazz & Heritage Festival for one song in a set. Today, she is one of the regular drummers backing the group.

Ketchens' group appears at Jazz Festivals in New Orleans and at music festivals, fairs, and showcases throughout the world. In 2006, she was part of a program for South African cultural exchange with the Field Band Foundation that was sponsored by the U.S. Department of State's Bureau of Educational and Cultural Affairs and Jazz at Lincoln Center in Johannesburg, Durban and Cape Town.

She has been featured in numerous documentaries about New Orleans, its heritage, and its music, including several profiles by WWOZ, New Orleans' Jazz radio station including a video profiles and audio programs, and dozens of articles from major newspapers and magazines around the world.

== Jazz and music festivals ==
Jazz & Music festivals Doreen Ketchens has performed at:

- New Orleans Jazz & Heritage Festival
- French Quarter Festival
- Satchmo SummerFest, New Orleans
- Iowa State Fair, Des Moines
- Dubuque Winter Jazz Festival, Dubuque, Iowa
- Modesto 11th Street Jazz Festival, Modesto, California
- 31st International Homecoming Festival, Calais, Maine

== Awards and honors ==
=== OffBeat's Best of The Beat Awards ===
Year	Category	Result	Ref.
2016	Best Clarinetist	Won	
2023	Best Clarinetist	Won	

== Filmography ==
Fan and media videos of her performances have been seen globally by millions of people on YouTube and other social media outlets with one video by the NOLA Insider Guide on Facebook reaching more than 3.9M people by October 2015. Professional performances and performances in feature films and television programs include:

=== Television ===
Year	Episode	Program	Network	Role
2013	"Civil Dysfunction Meets Civil Disobedience"	Treme	HBO	Herself
2013	"Yes, Yes We Can"	Treme	HBO	Herself
2024	"The Sweet Life"	Queer Eye	Netflix	Herself

=== Film ===
Year	Title	Role	Notes
2006	"Doreen's Jazz New Orleans Live in Korea 2006"	Herself	DVD
2013	Tyler Perry's Temptation: Confessions of a Marriage Counselor	Singer	
2015	Doreen's Jazz New Orleans Live in New Orleans 2015	Herself	

=== Videos ===
- This Train - New Orleans Calling, WWOZ.org

== On radio ==
Year	Episode	Program	Station/Network	Format
2015	On Jackson Square and Royal Street	New Orleans Calling	WWOZ	FM Radio
