= Ascona Jazz Festival =

Annual festival in Switzerland

Coordinates: 46°09′N 8°46′E

Ascona Jazz Festival, or Jazz Ascona, is an annual jazz festival held in Ascona, Switzerland. The 10-day festival takes place from late June to early July on the Swiss shores of Lake Maggiore and is devoted to historical styles of jazz, particularly New Orleans jazz.

Under the direction of Nicolas Gilliet, Jazz Ascona features more than 200 concerts, 300 musicians, and events such as gospel choirs, jam sessions, exhibits, conferences, and films.

== Ascona Jazz Award ==
Established in 2006, the Ascona Jazz Awards recognizes individuals from the jazz world who distinguished themselves during the previous year or during their career. The award is presented annually during the Jazz Ascona festival and is supported by the municipality of Ascona.

- 2006 Pepe Lienhard, big band director, Switzerland; Lillian Boutté, singer and World Ambassor of New Orleans Music (Special Award)
- 2007 Red Holloway, saxophonist, U.S., Father Jerome Ledoux (Special Award)
- 2008 Donald Harrison, saxophonist and Mardi Gras Indian Big Chief
- 2009 Rossano Sportiello, pianist, Italy
- 2010 Shannon Powell and Herlin Riley, drummers, U.S.
- 2011 Lionel Batiste, singer, Grand Marshal and bass drummer, U.S., and Paul Kuhn, singer, pianist, Germany
- 2012 Irma Thomas, singer, U.S.
- 2013 Gerald French, drummer, U.S.
- 2014 Stephen Perry, president and CEO, New Orleans Visitors & Convention Bureau, U.S.
- 2015 Irvin Mayfield, trumpeter, composer, band leader, U.S.
- 2016 Davell Crawford, singer, pianist, band leader, U.S.
- 2017 Jon Cleary, pianist, multi-instrumentalist, vocalist, and songwriter, U.S.

== See also ==
- Estival Jazz
