= Doreen's Jazz New Orleans =

Dixieland and Traditional Jazz band

Doreen's Jazz New Orleans is a Dixieland and Traditional Jazz band created and led by clarinetist Doreen Ketchens. The group has toured the world, and performs in the Royal Street Performing Arts zone in the French Quarter of New Orleans, at jazz festivals, fairs, showcases, and concert halls. Videos of the group by fans, news, and entertainment organizations have been seen by millions of people on the Internet and the group has recorded more than 20 CDs or DVDs of the group's work. The group has been featured in numerous articles, including New Orleans' Jazz radio station's Busker Blog.

Ketchens began playing in Jackson Square with her first band, the Jackson Square All-Stars. Their band evolved into "Doreen's Jazz New Orleans," and, after much struggle with the chauvinism of traditional Jazz and club owners, they managed to find a winning formula playing and entertaining crowds via their street shows, Jazz festivals, and then, through direct sales of their music and videos on the Internet.

== Discography ==
Year	Artist	Volume	Title	Label
1994	Doreen's Jazz New Orleans	IV	Taipei '94	DJNO Records
1995	Doreen's Jazz New Orleans	V	Mama Don't Want	DJNO Records
1996	Doreen's Jazz New Orleans	VI	The Blues	DJNO Records
1997	Doreen's Jazz New Orleans	VII	Crescent City Swing	DJNO Records
1998	Doreen's Jazz New Orleans	VIII	God Is My Rock	DJNO Records
1999	Doreen's Jazz New Orleans	IX	2 for 2000 "Swing Out"	DJNO Records
1999	Doreen's Jazz New Orleans	X	2 for 2000 Show Your 'Tits' At Mardi Gras	DJNO Records
2001	Doreen's Jazz New Orleans	XI	What A Wonderful World	DJNO Records
2001	Doreen's Jazz New Orleans	XII	Jackson Square Jam!	DJNO Records
2001	Doreen's Jazz New Orleans	XIII	A New Orleans Christmas	DJNO Records
2002	Doreen's Jazz New Orleans	XIV	Bill Bailey	DJNO Records
2003	Doreen's Jazz New Orleans	XV	The Band! The Band!	DJNO Records
2006	Doreen's Jazz New Orleans	XVI	Finally (Part 1)	DJNO Records
2006	Doreen's Jazz New Orleans	XVII	Finally (Part 2)	DJNO Records
2011	Doreen's Jazz New Orleans	XVIII	New Orlean's Best Kept Secrets (Triple Threat Series)	DJNO Records
2012	Doreen's Jazz New Orleans	XIX	"Blacklisted" Hate Has Made Us Great! (Triple Threat Series Part II)	DJNO Records
2012	Doreen's Jazz New Orleans	XX	Who Dat Playin On The Streets? (Triple Threat Series Part III)	DJNO Records
2012	Doreen's Jazz New Orleans	XXI	Something Extra Little Drummer Girl (Triple Threat Series Part IV)	DJNO Records
2014	Doreen's Jazz New Orleans	XXII	Dorian Did Dat! (Dorian Steppin' Out Series Part 1)	DJNO Records
2014	Doreen's Jazz New Orleans	XXIII	Dorian Did Dat Again!!! You Go Girl! (Dorian Steppin' Out Series Part 2)	DJNO Records
2015	Doreen's Jazz New Orleans	XXIV	Live In Concert	DJNO Records
2017	Doreen's Jazz New Orleans	XXV	Guardians of our Culture (Takin' it to the Streets)	DJNO Records
2018	Doreen's Jazz New Orleans	XXVI	Our View, Our Music	DJNO Records
2018	Doreen's Jazz New Orleans	XXVII	Stellar (A New Orleans Trilogy: part 2)	DJNO Records
2018	Doreen's Jazz New Orleans	XXVIII	Spittin' Fire	DJNO Records
2020	Doreen's Jazz New Orleans	XXIX	Pandemic 2020	DJNO Records
2021	Doreen's Jazz New Orleans	XXX	Up Above My Head (The Gospel)	DJNO Records
2023	Doreen's Jazz New Orleans	XXXI	A New Orleans Christmas Too!	DJNO Records
2024	Doreen's Jazz New Orleans	XXXII	Live at the 2024 New Orleans Jazz Festival!	DJNO Records
2024	Doreen's Jazz New Orleans	XXXIII	Walkin' Through the Streets	DJNO Records
