= Estival Jazz =

Annual music festival in Switzerland

Estival Jazz (also Lugano Estival Jazz) is an annual music festival that takes place in summer in the Swiss city of Lugano in the canton of Ticino. It is an open-air and free of charge festival.

The event, which is usually spread over a total of three days, takes place in Lugano and is dedicated to jazz with all its styles. In recent years, the musical spectrum has also been expanded to include world music. Depending on the year, the event includes between 20 and 30 free open-air concerts with numerous well-known international musicians.

The foundation for Estival Jazz, first performed in 1979, was laid in 1977 with the concert appearance of Archie Shepp together with Mal Waldron, Wilbur Little and Clifford Jarvis. A concert series followed the following year with performances by Elvin Jones, Gary Burton, Don Cherry, Abdullah Ibrahim and Mal Waldron. In 1979 the Estival Jazz was launched, which developed into the largest jazz event in Europe. The concert series has around 250,000 visitors a year and is broadcast live by the Ticino television station RSI live.

Among the most notable of the approximately 300 artists who have performed since the inaugural Estival Jazz are Miles Davis, Dizzy Gillespie, Keith Jarrett, Ray Charles, Bobby McFerrin, Herbie Hancock, B. B. King, Pat Metheny Trio, Friedrich Gulda, Tito Puente, Chick Corea, The Manhattan Transfer, Take 6, Gato Barbieri, Maynard Ferguson, Cesária Évora, Dee Dee Bridgewater, Carla Bley, Barbara Hendricks, Wynton Marsalis, Cheb Mami, Noa, Oscar D'León, Jon Hendricks, Paco de Lucía, Van Morrison, Buddy Guy, Taj Mahal, Cheb Khaled, Jethro Tull, Gianna Nannini, Roger Hodgson, Chucho Valdés, Level 42, Candy Dulfer, Snarky Puppy, Manu Dibango, Hugh Masekela, Richard Bona, Marcus Miller, and Lokua Kanza.

== See also ==
- Ascona Jazz Festival
