= Treme Brass Band =

American brass band

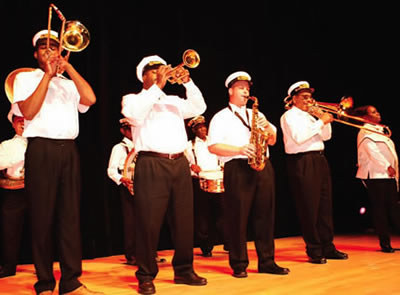
The Treme Brass Band opened the 2006 National Endowment for the Arts' National Heritage Fellows concert.

The Treme Brass Band is a marching brass band from New Orleans, Louisiana led by snare drummer Benny Jones Sr. The band, which plays traditional New Orleans-style brass band music, features a shifting lineup that has included trumpeters Kermit Ruffins and James Andrews, tenor saxophonists Elliot Callier, Frederick Sheppard, and John Gilbert, trombonist Corey Henry, and sousaphonist Kirk Joseph. Before his death in 2012, Lionel Batiste appeared consistently on the bass drum. They have released two albums, Gimme My Money Back on Arhoolie Records and I Got a Big, Fat Woman on the Sound of New Orleans Records label. The band takes its name from New Orleans' Tremé neighborhood; due to some historical confusion, the "Treme" in the name is sometimes spelled "Tremè" or "Tremé". In 2010 the Treme Brass Band performed with Uncle Lionel Batiste to play Voodoo Experience in New Orleans.

The Treme Brass Band, including "Uncle" Lionel Batiste, was featured in the 2011 non-fiction film by Darren Hoffman, Tradition is a Temple. Their version of "A Closer Walk With Thee" was heard in the first episode of the HBO series Treme and is included on the series soundtrack. Additionally, the Treme Brass Band leads the Marching Krewe KOE on their Fat Tuesday Parade throughout the French Quarter in New Orleans.

The band is a recipient of a 2006 National Heritage Fellowship awarded by the National Endowment for the Arts, which is the United States' highest honor in the folk and traditional arts.
