= Tremé =

New Orleans neighborhood in Louisiana, United States

Tremé / Lafitte Treme
- New Orleans Neighborhood
- Faubourg Tremé
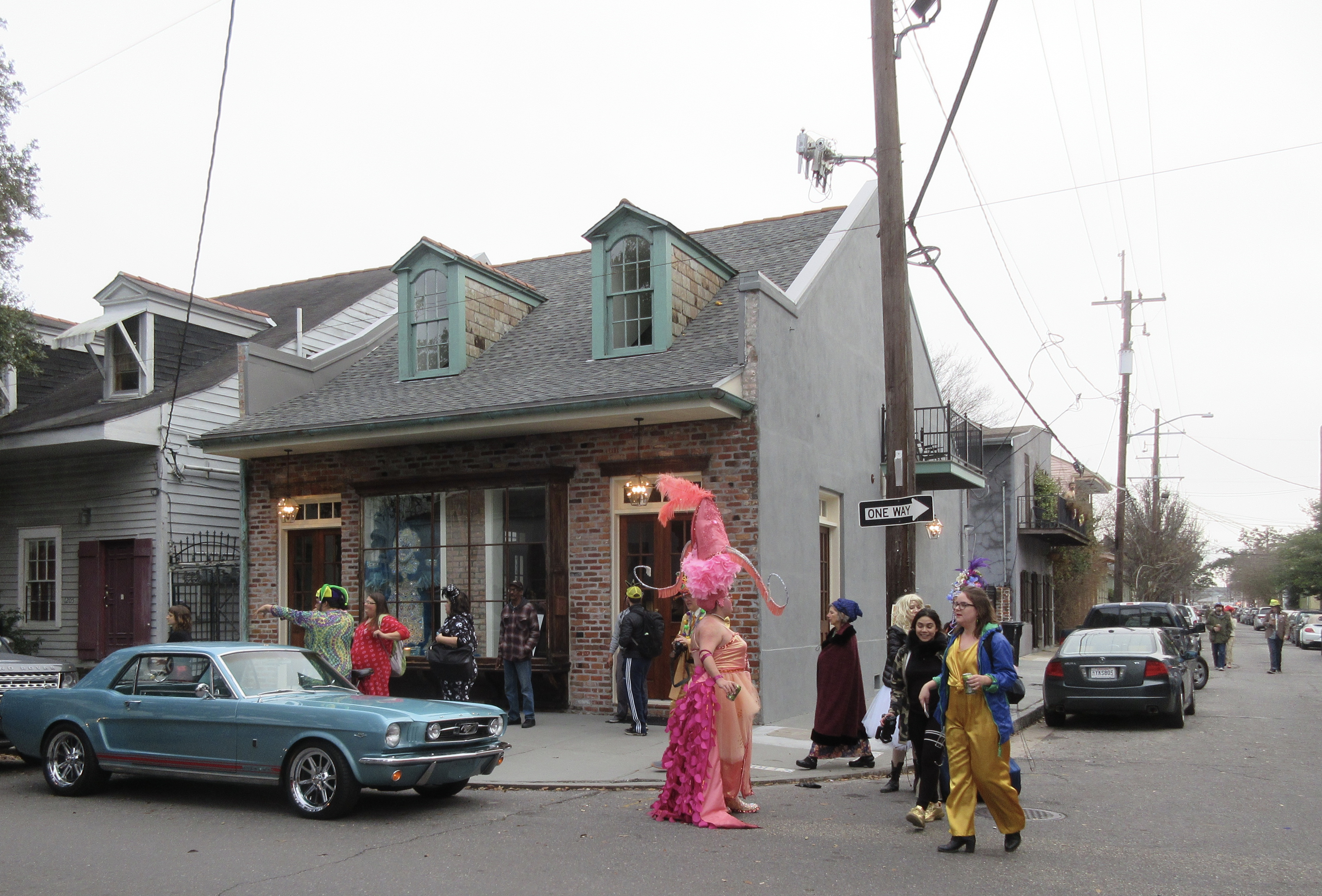
- The Faubourg Tremé on Mardi Gras day in 2018
- Interactive map of Tremé / Lafitte
- Coordinates: 29°58′06″N 90°04′26″W
- Country: United States
- State: Louisiana
- Parish: Orleans
- City: New Orleans
- Planning district: District 4, Mid-City District

Area
  - Total: 0.69 sq mi (1.8 km^{2})
  - Land: 0.69 sq mi (1.8 km^{2})
  - Water: 0.00 sq mi (0 km^{2})
- Elevation: 0 ft (0 m)

Population (2010)
  - Total: 4,155
  - Density: 6,000/sq mi (2,300/km^{2})
- Time zone: UTC-6 (CST)
  - Summer (DST): UTC-5 (CDT)
- Area code: 504

Tremé (/trəˈmeɪ/ trə-MAY) is a neighborhood in New Orleans, Louisiana. "Tremé" is often rendered as Treme, and the neighborhood is sometimes called by its more formal French name, the Faubourg Tremé; it is listed in the New Orleans City Planning Districts as Tremé / Lafitte when including the Lafitte Projects.

Founded in the 1810s, it is one of the oldest neighborhoods in the city, and was initially the main neighborhood of its free people of color. Historically a racially mixed neighborhood, it remains an important center of the city's African-American and Créole culture, especially the modern brass band tradition. Some sources go so far as to call it the oldest black-majority neighborhood in the U.S.

The Faubourg Tremé was created from land owned by Claude Tremé in 1810. A subdistrict of the Mid-City District Area, its boundaries as defined by the New Orleans City Planning Commission are Esplanade Avenue to the east, North Rampart Street to the south, St. Louis Street to the west and North Broad Street to the north.

== History ==
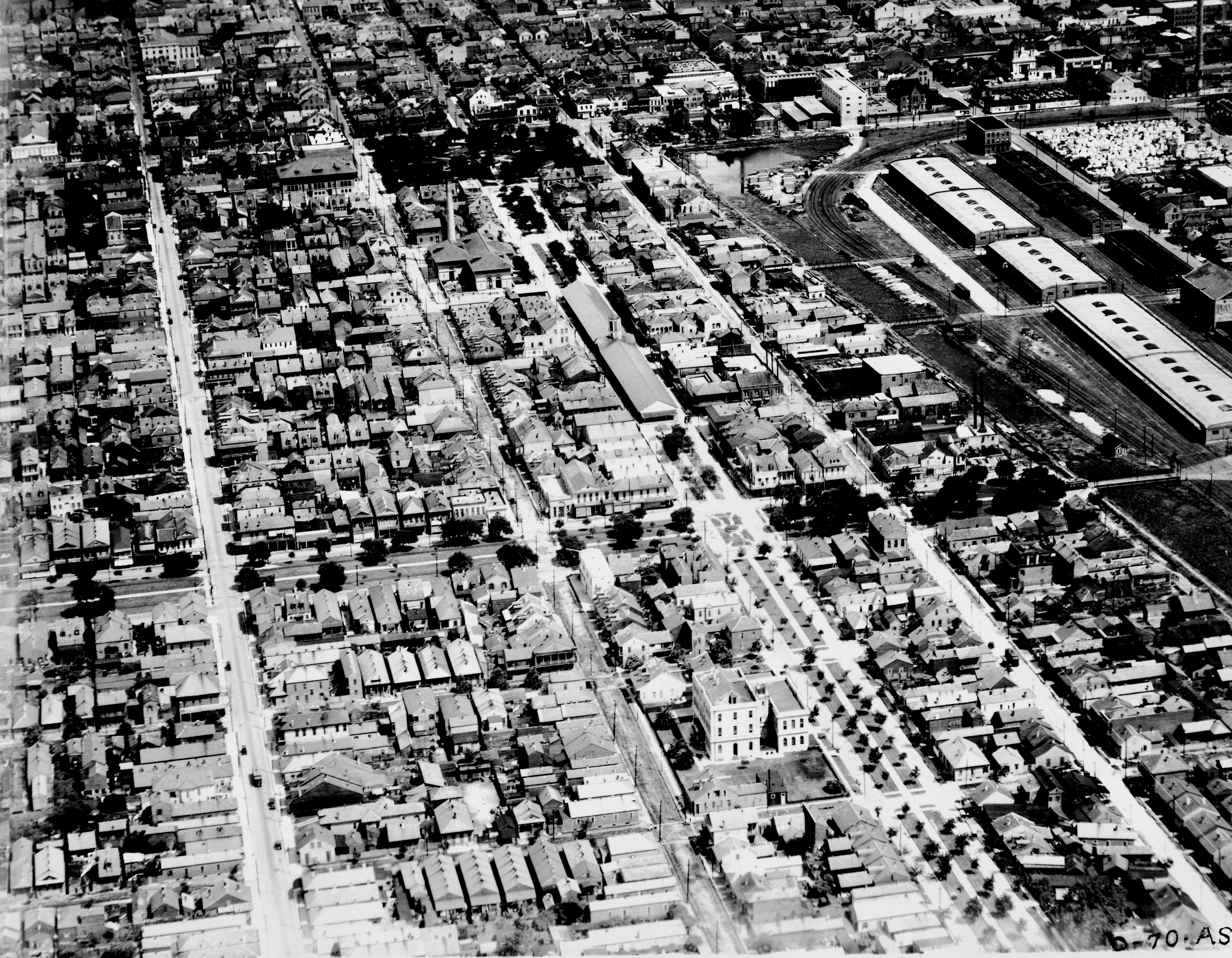
Treme in 1922

The Tremé neighborhood began as the Morand Plantation and two forts—St. Ferdinand and St. John. Near the end of the 18th century, Claude Tremé purchased the land from the original plantation owner. By 1794 the Carondelet Canal was built from the French Quarter to Bayou St. John, splitting the land. Developers began building subdivisions throughout the area to house a diverse population that included Caucasians and free persons of color.

Tremé abuts the north, or lake, side of the French Quarter, away from the Mississippi River—"back of town" as earlier generations of New Orleanians used to say. Its traditional borders were Rampart Street on the south, Canal Street on the west, Esplanade Avenue on the east, and Broad Street on the north. Claiborne Avenue is a primary thoroughfare through the neighborhood. At the end of the 19th century, the Storyville red-light district was carved out of the upper part of Tremé; in the 1940s this was torn down and made into a public housing project. This area is no longer considered part of the neighborhood. The "town square" of Tremé was Congo Square—originally known as "Place des Nègres"—where enslaved people gathered on Sundays to dance. This tradition flourished until the United States took control, and officials grew more anxious about unsupervised gatherings of enslaved people in the years before the Civil War.

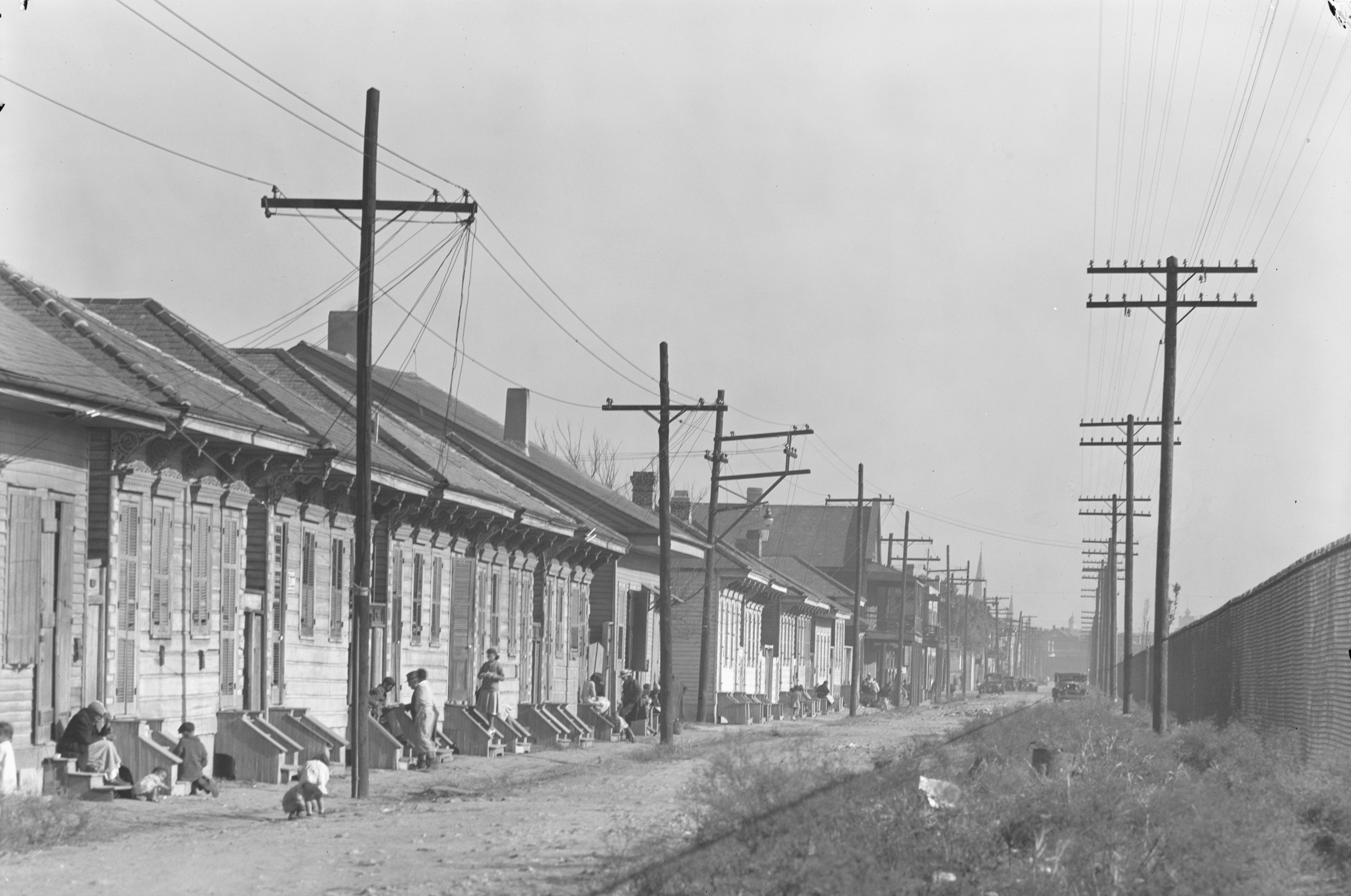
Creole Cottages on Lafitte Street in the Tremé, 1935

The square was also an important place of business for enslaved people, enabling some to purchase their freedom from selling crafts and goods there. For much of the rest of the 19th century, the square was an open-air market. "Creoles of color" brass and symphonic bands gave concerts, providing the foundation for a more improvisational style that would come to be known as "Jazz". At the end of the 19th century, the city officially renamed the square "Beauregard Square" after the French Créole Confederate General P.G.T. Beauregard, but the neighborhood people seldom used that name. In 2011, the city restored the traditional name of "Congo Square".

In the early 1960s, in an urban renewal project later considered a mistake by most analysts, a large portion of central Tremé was torn down. The land stood vacant for some time, then in the 1970s the city created Louis Armstrong Park in the area and named Congo Square within Armstrong Park. In 1994, the New Orleans Jazz National Historical Park was established here.

Musicians from Tremé include Doreen Ketchens, Alphonse Picou, Kermit Ruffins, Troy "Trombone Shorty" Andrews, Lucien Barbarin, and "The King of Treme" Shannon Powell. Additionally, comedian Mark Normand grew up in the neighborhood. While predominantly African-American, the population has been mixed from the 19th century through to the 21st. Jazz musicians of European ancestry such as Henry Ragas and Louis Prima also lived in Tremé. Also, Joe's Cozy Corner in Tremé is often considered the birthplace of Rebirth Brass Band, one of the most notable current New Orleans bands. Alex Chilton, who led the rock groups Big Star and The Box Tops, lived in Tremé from the early 1990s until his death in 2010. During Hurricane Katrina, the Tremé neighborhood suffered minor to moderate flooding. In the portion of the neighborhood in from I-10, the water was generally not high enough to damage many of the old raised homes. The neighborhood demographics have changed in recent years due to gentrification and the proliferation of short-term rentals such as Airbnb.

== African-American heritage sites ==
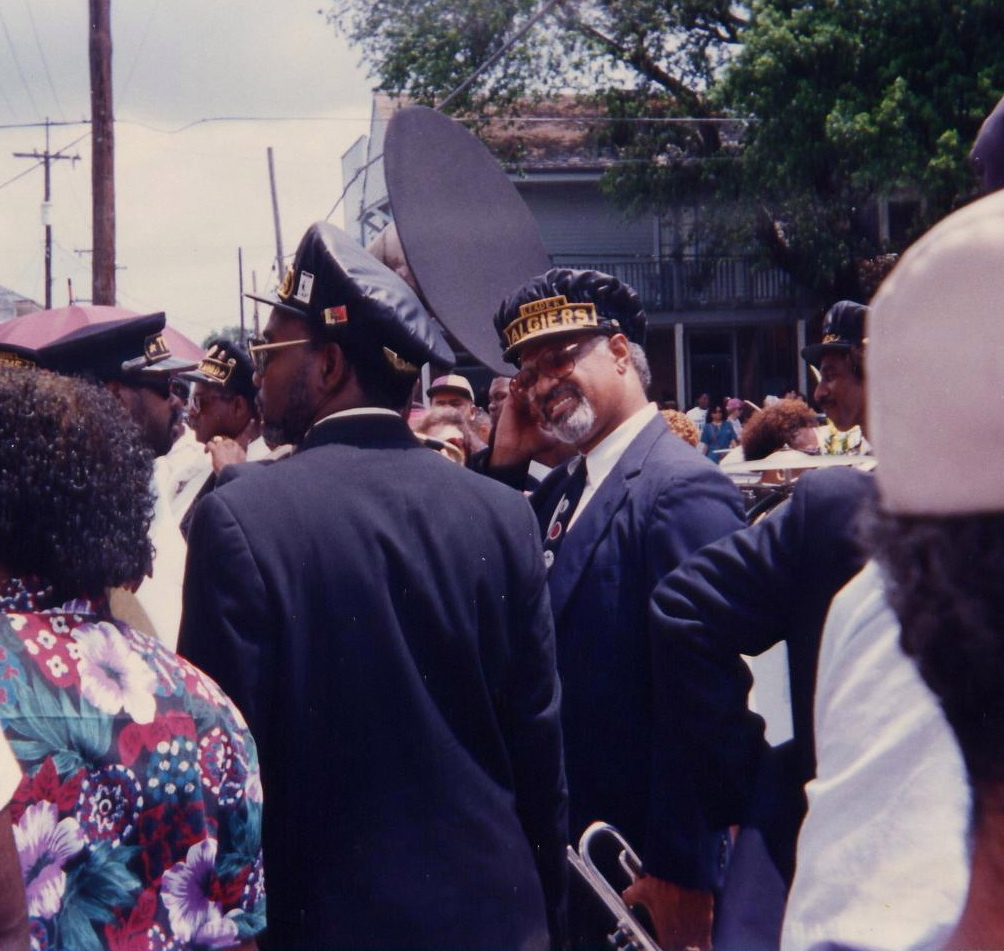
A Second Line band going through the Tremé

Located in Tremé, the New Orleans African American Museum is dedicated to protecting, preserving, and promoting through education the history, art, and communities of African Americans in New Orleans and the African diaspora. It is listed on the Louisiana African American Heritage Trail, as is the community's St. Augustine Church — the oldest African-American Catholic parish in the U.S..

== Geography ==
According to the United States Census Bureau, the district has a total area of 0.69 square miles (1.8 km^{2}), all of which is land.

=== Adjacent neighborhoods ===
- Bayou St. John (west)
- French Quarter (east)
- Iberville Projects (south)
- Seventh Ward (north)
- Tulane/Gravier (south)

=== Boundaries ===
The New Orleans City Planning Commission defines the boundaries of Tremé as these streets: Esplanade Avenue, North Rampart Street, St. Louis Street, North Broad Street.

== Demographics ==
As of the census of 2000, there were 8,853 people, 3,429 households, and 2,064 families residing in the neighborhood. The population density was 12,830 /mi^{2} (4,918 /km^{2}).

As of the census of 2010, there were 4,155 people residing in the neighborhood. The neighborhood was 92.4% Black or African American, 4.9% White, 1.5% Hispanic, 0.1% Asian, 0.5% Two or More Races, and 0.6% Other.

As of the census of 2020, there were 4,590 people residing in the neighborhood. The neighborhood is 56.3% Black or African American, 35.6% White, 5.1% Hispanic, 0.4% Asian, 2.6% Two or More Races, and 0.2% Other.

== Education ==
- New Orleans Public Schools and various charter schools serve the community.
- Joseph S. Clark Preparatory High School is located in Tremé.
- The McDonogh 35 High School is in the Tremé area. There were plans to move the school to the Phillips/Waters school site by 2013.

The Roman Catholic Archdiocese of New Orleans operates Catholic schools. St. Peter Claver School was in Tremé. It was established in 1921, and closed in 2019. In its final year it had 147 students, while the archdiocese's expected enrollment was 200. At the time its budget shortfall was $83,000. Its tuition usually ranged from $5,400 to $5,900 during the 2017-2018 school year.

== In popular culture ==
=== Films ===
- Shake the Devil Off (2007), a documentary co-written by Swiss-based director Peter Entell with Lydia Breen, that explores the post-Katrina lives of parishioners at St. Augustine Church in the Tremé (the oldest predominantly black Catholic parish in the nation). Father Jerome LeDoux (St. Augustine's priest 1990-2005) was a central character in the film. In 2006, he was recognized by the City of New Orleans for his work fostering greater appreciation of the Tremé's black history and culture.
- Faubourg Treme: The Untold Story of Black New Orleans (2008), a documentary film by Dawn Logsdon and Lolis Eric Elie, former Times Picayune columnist and later HBO Tremé staff writer, which bridges the pre- and post-Katrina stories of Tremé (America’s oldest surviving black community and neighborhood) and features a cast of local musicians, artists and writers
- Tradition is a Temple (2011), popular contemporary musicians from the Tremé, like "The King of Tremé" Shannon Powell, Lucien Barbarin, and the Treme Brass Band, are featured heavily in this non-fiction film by Darren Hoffman

=== Music ===
- Jazz singer Dee Dee Bridgewater recorded her album Dee Dee's Feathers (2015) in Esplanade Studios in Tremé, to commemorate 10th anniversary of Hurricane Katrina.

=== Television ===
- Treme, an HBO drama series created in 2010 by David Simon (creator of The Wire) and Eric Overmeyer, is set in the aftermath of Hurricane Katrina and centers on the lives of residents of the Tremé area.

== Gallery ==
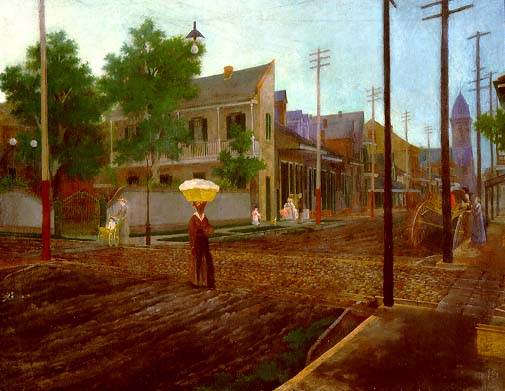
Corner of St. Claude & Dumaine Streets, 1895

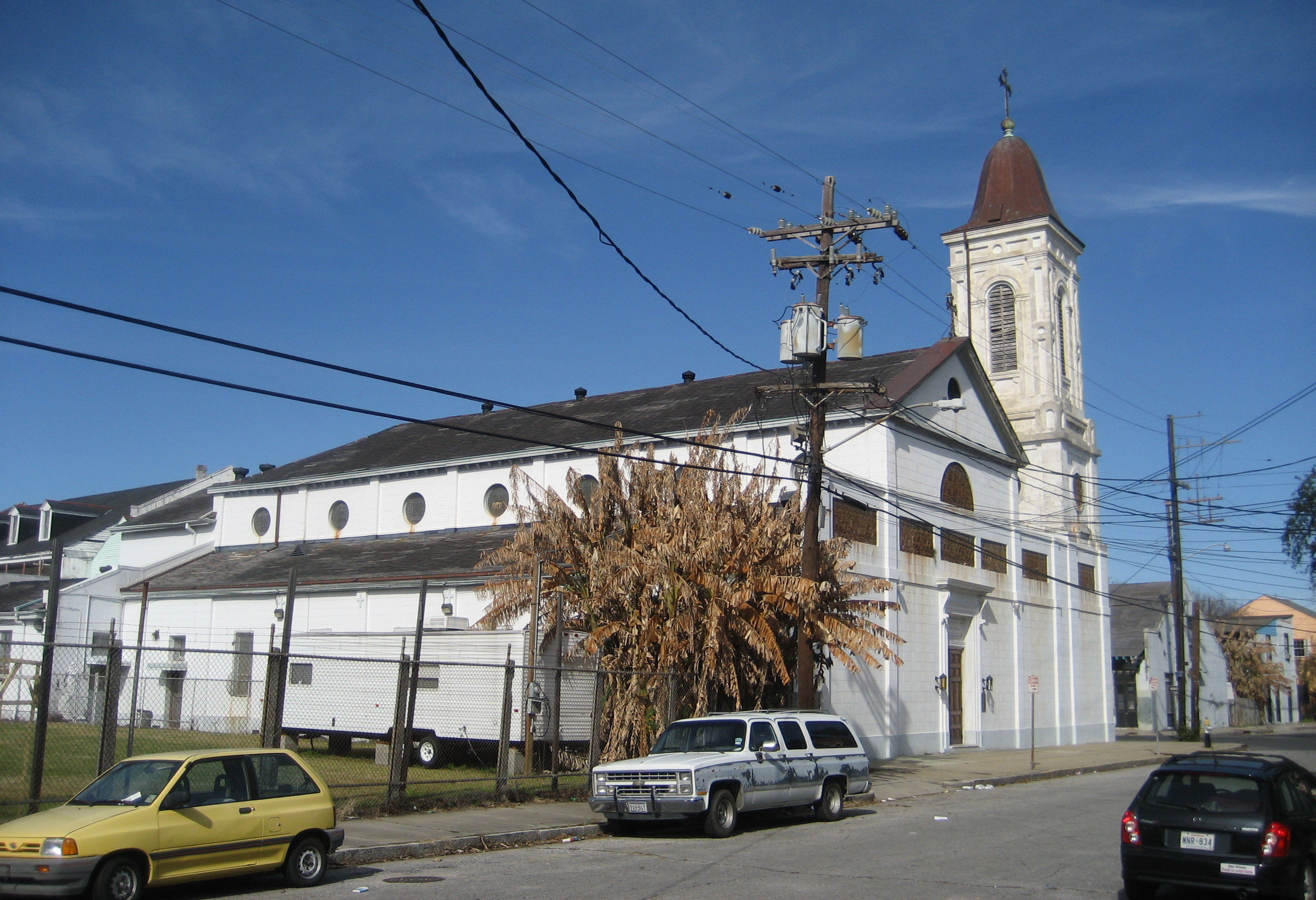
St. Augustine Church

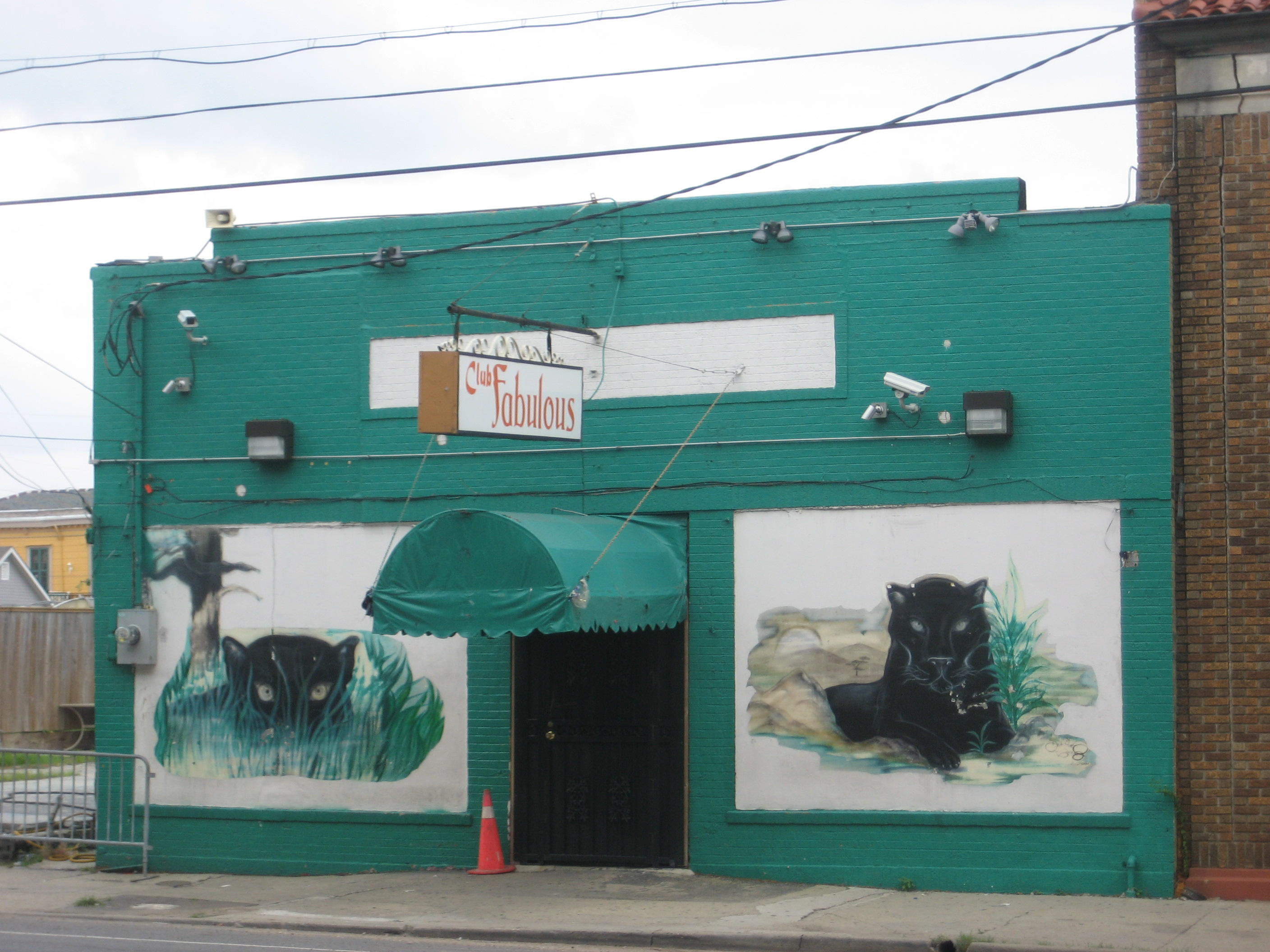
"Club Fabulous" bar

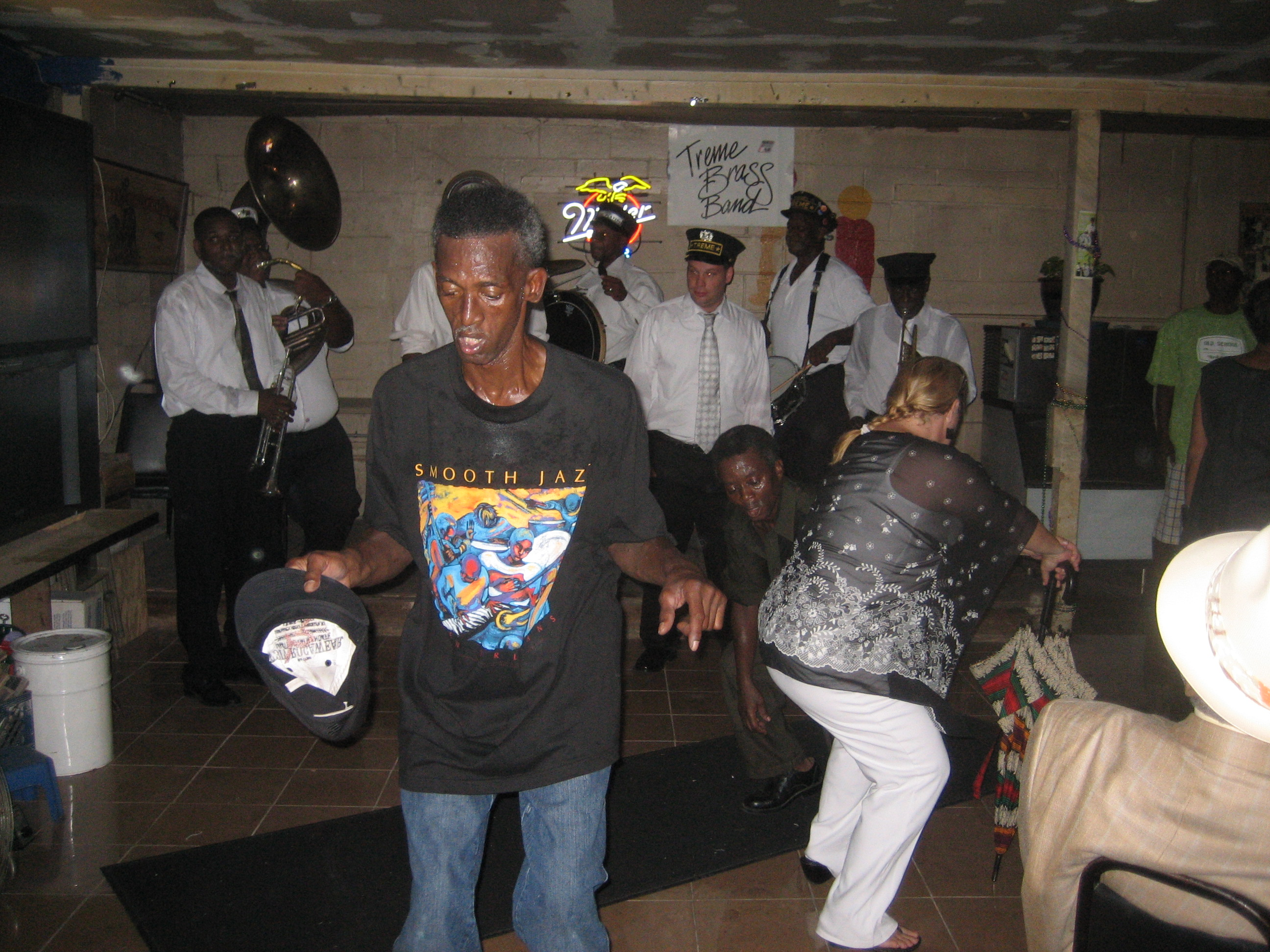
Tremé Brass band playing in the Candlelight Lounge

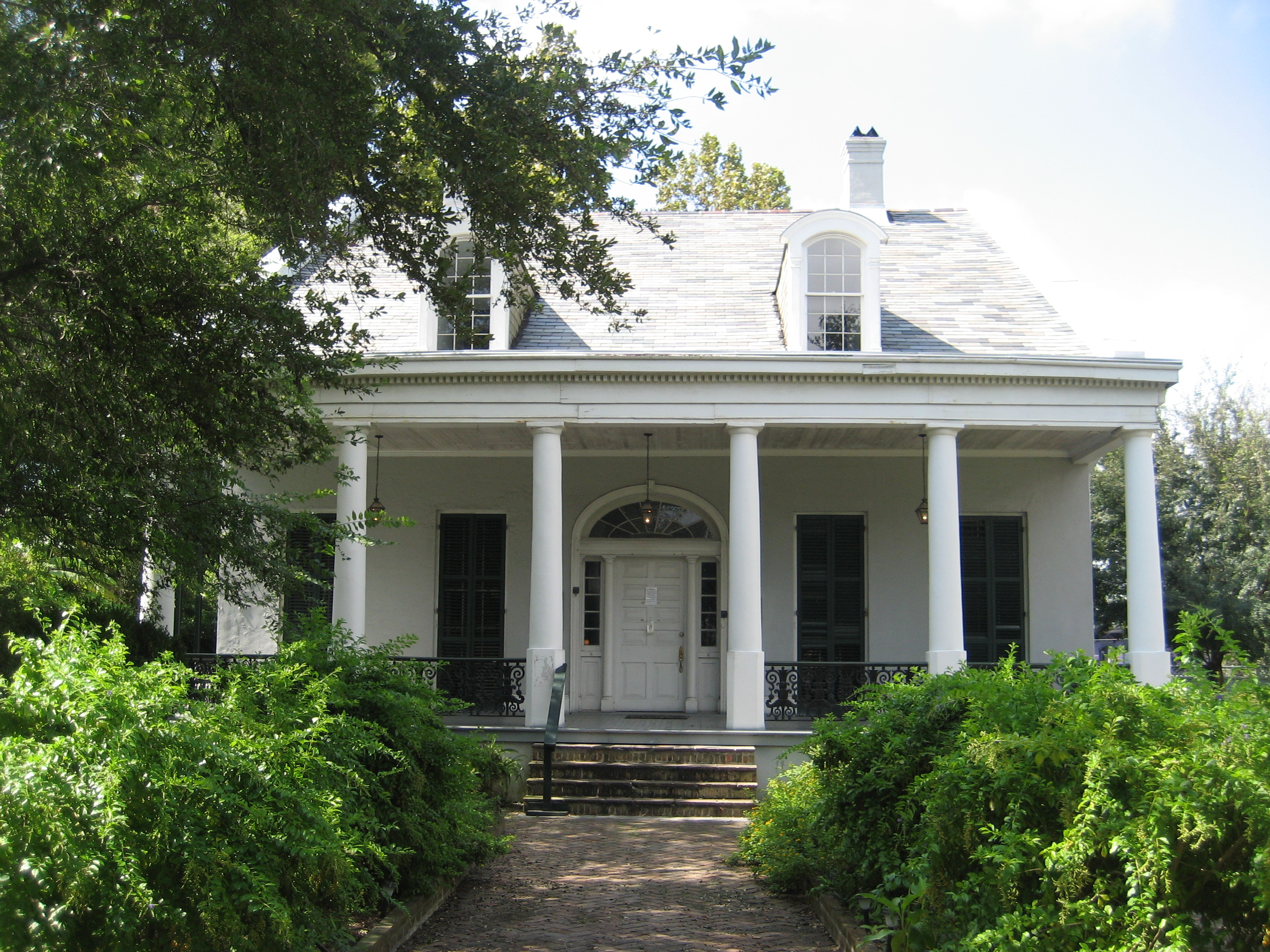
New Orleans African American Museum

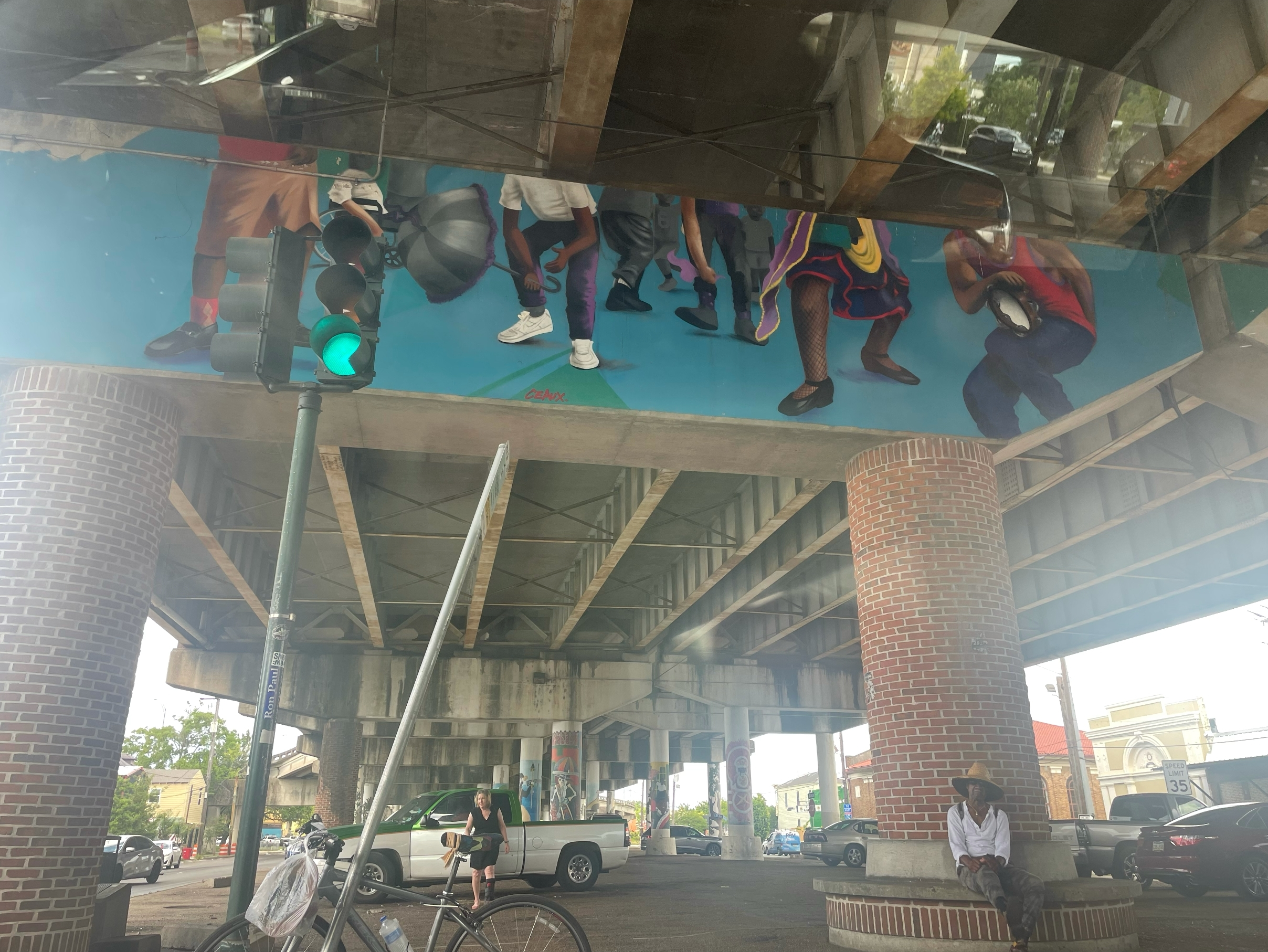

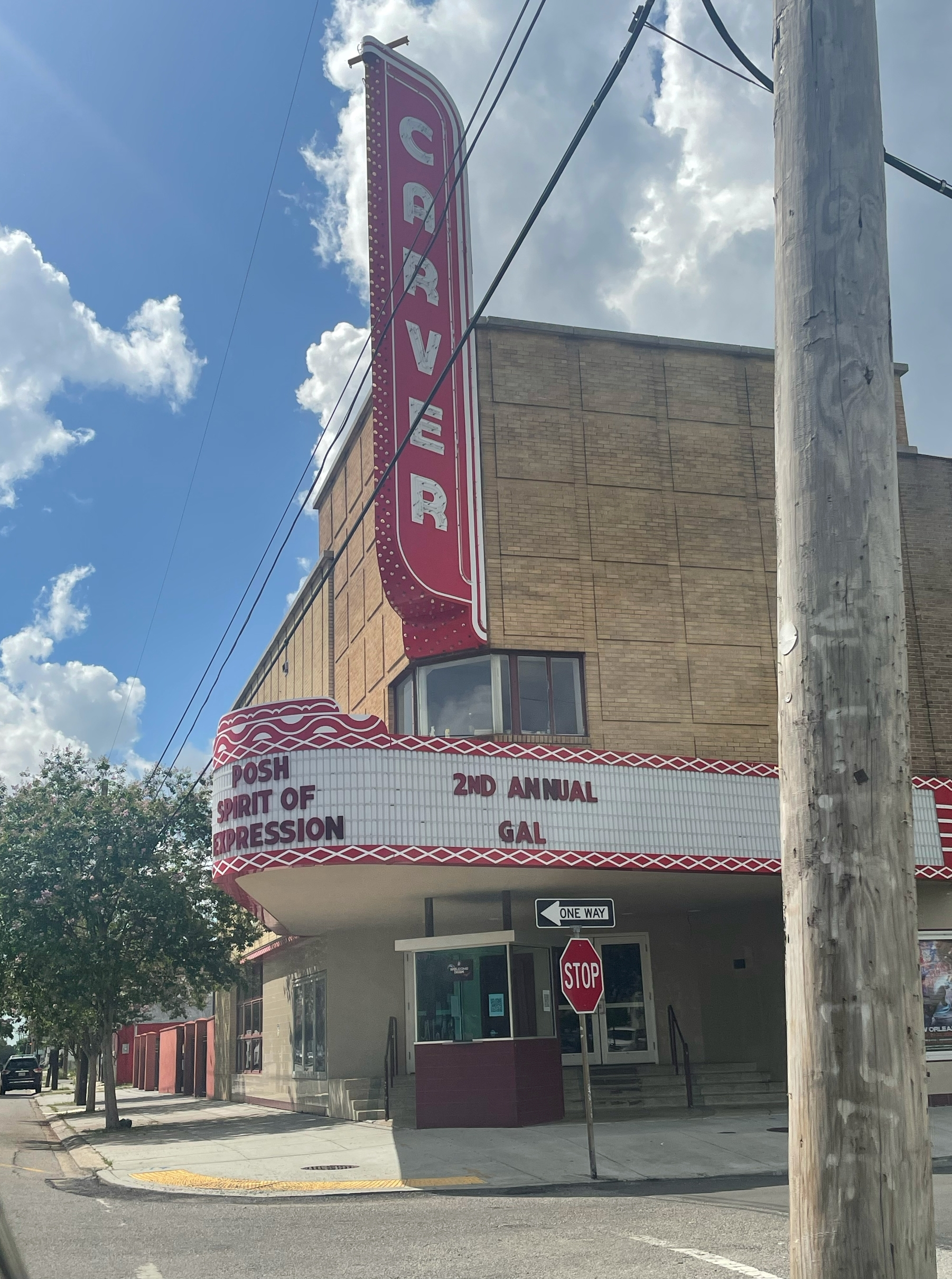

Faerie Playhouse

== See also ==
- Lafitte Projects
- Neighborhoods in New Orleans
