= Tradition Is a Temple =

- Theatrical poster
- Directed by: Darren Hoffman
- Written by: Darren Hoffman
- Produced by: Darren Hoffman; Kristen McEntyre; Patrick Stafford
- Starring: "The King of Treme" Shannon Powell; Jason Marsalis; Roland Guerin; Topsy Chapman and Solid Harmony; Lucien Barbarin; Steve Masakowski; Ed Petersen; Chuck Perkins; The Baby Boyz Brass Band; The Treme Brass Band
- Narrated by: Chuck Perkins
- Cinematography: James Laxton
- Edited by: Darren Hoffman; Benedict Kasulis; Ryland Jones
- Distributed by: Self Distributed
- Release date: November 14, 2013
- Running time: 96 minutes
- Country: United States
- Language: English
- Budget: Under US$ 100,000

Tradition Is a Temple is an American documentary film about New Orleans jazz culture and modernization's effect on American traditions, written and directed by Darren Hoffman and released in 2013.

== Synopsis ==
Contemporary New Orleans jazz musicians discuss their childhood introductions to music in Baptist churches and through local traditions such as the second line (parades) and jazz funerals, and the role of Danny Barker (1909–1994) in keeping traditional New Orleans Jazz alive through the 1970s and '80s. Asking the artists point-blank, director Darren Hoffman explores the potential "death" of traditional jazz through modernization and marginalization, and its preservation through mentorship and the continuation of traditions that intrigue and inspire young people to play the music of previous generations.

== Performances and production ==
In addition to in depth personal interviews, Tradition is a Temple is composed of various multi-camera professional studio recordings. The performances were recorded by steve Reynolds at the University of New Orleans School of Music. The production took place completely post-Hurricane Katrina, beginning in August 2006.
