= Chuck Perkins =

American poet

- Born: Charles Perkins; 1965; New Orleans, Louisiana
- Occupations: Orator, poet, narrator, owner of New Orleans performance venue Cafe Istanbul

Chuck Perkins (born Charleston Perkins; August 25, 1965) is an American spoken word poet, orator, narrator, and activist who infuses the rhythms and vernacular from the Crescent City into his musical spoken word pieces. The New Orleans Times-Picayune says that he "recites poetry like a prize fighter...always going for a knock out." He has performed internationally at London's prestigious South Bank Centre with Amiri Baraka, Jazz at Lincoln Center with Nicolas Payton and Pedrito Martinez as well as performances in Paris, Toulouse, Manchester, Liverpool, Cambridge, and Amsterdam. Chuck Perkins has published his first book of poetry and essays titled, "Beautiful and Ugly Too". He was host of WBOK's defunct radio talk show, The Conscious Hour with Chuck Perkins.

== Life ==
Son of Charles and Gail Perkins, Chuck was born in the inner city, Pigeon Town neighborhood in New Orleans, Louisiana. After graduating Alcee Fortier Senior High School he joined the U.S. Marines. Perkins received a business degree from Xavier University before living in Dallas, Texas and Chicago, Illinois. Chuck finally settled back down in his home town in 2002.

== Career ==
=== Spoken word albums ===
Bucket of Questions
A love song for NOLA

=== Spoken word collaborations ===
- The Voices of Urban Renewal in 2000 with Mos Def and Chuck D
- Nuspirits Helsinki (2002)

A Love Song for Nola

=== Film ===
- Tradition is a Temple Narration

=== Publications ===
- Spoken Word Revolution Redux (2007)
- Kente Cloth: South Western Voices of African Diaspora (1998)
