= Leroy Jones (trumpeter) =

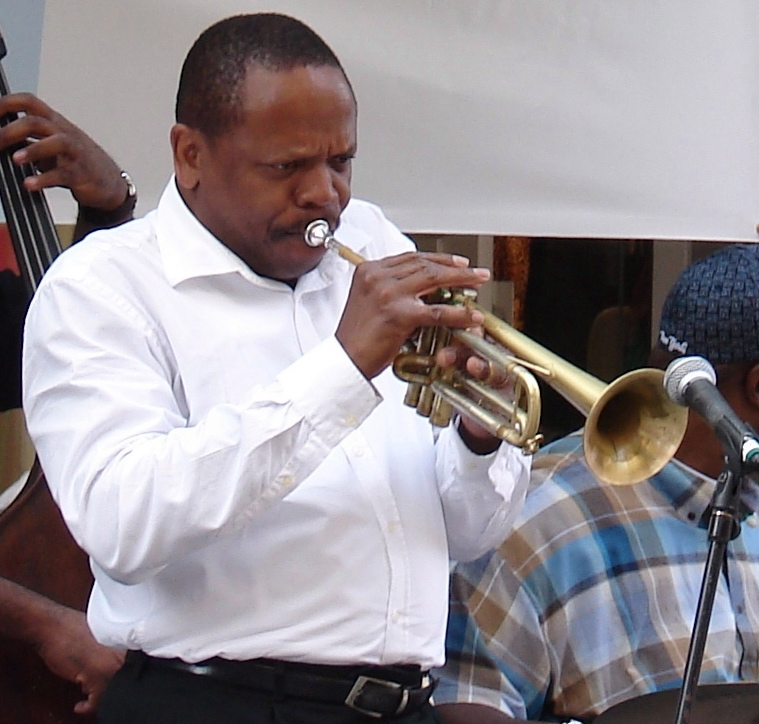
- Jones in concert ⋅

Background information
- Born: February 20, 1958 (age 68); New Orleans, Louisiana, U.S.
- Genre: Jazz
- Occupation: Musician
- Instruments: Trumpet, voice
- Years active: 1972-present
- Label: Columbia
- Formerly of: Hurricane Brass Band
- Website: spiritofneworleans.com/leroy.htm

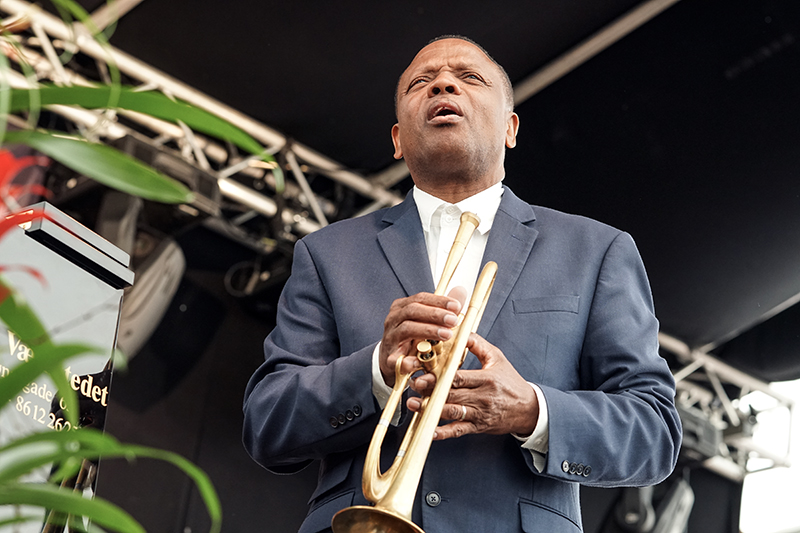
Leroy Jones in Denmark 2017

Leroy Jones (born February 20, 1958) is an American jazz trumpeter. Born in New Orleans, Louisiana, Jones began playing trumpet at the age of ten, and by the time he was 12 was leading the Fairview Baptist Church Marching Band, a group of young musicians organized by jazz guitarist and banjo player Danny Barker. When the musicians' union forced Barker to disband the group in 1974, Jones became a union musician and took over the running of the group, renamed the Hurricane Brass Band, himself. In 1975 or 1976, he left the group, touring for a time with Eddie Vinson and Della Reese before forming his own group, the Leroy Jones Quintet. In 1991, Jones joined the big band of Harry Connick, Jr., and the exposure with Connick's band (including the opportunity for the Leroy Jones Quintet to open for Connick, which they did in 1994), led to Jones' releasing his first album under his own name; Mo' Cream From The Crop came out on the Columbia label in 1994. The Leroy Jones Quintet continues to tour and record, and since 2004 Jones has also appeared with the Preservation Hall Jazz Band and Dr. John.

== Discography ==
- 1975 - Leroy Jones and his Hurricane Marching Brass Band of New Orleans
- 1994 - Mo' Cream from the Crop
- 1996 - Props for Pops
- 1999 - City of Sounds
- 2002 - Back to My Roots
- 2003 - Wonderful Christmas: A Brass Salute to the King of Kings
- 2005 - New Orleans Brass Band Music: Memories of the Fairview & Hurricane Band
- 2007 - Soft Shoe
- 2009 - Sweeter Than a Summer Breeze
