= Kermit Ruffins =

American jazz trumpeter and singer (born 1964)

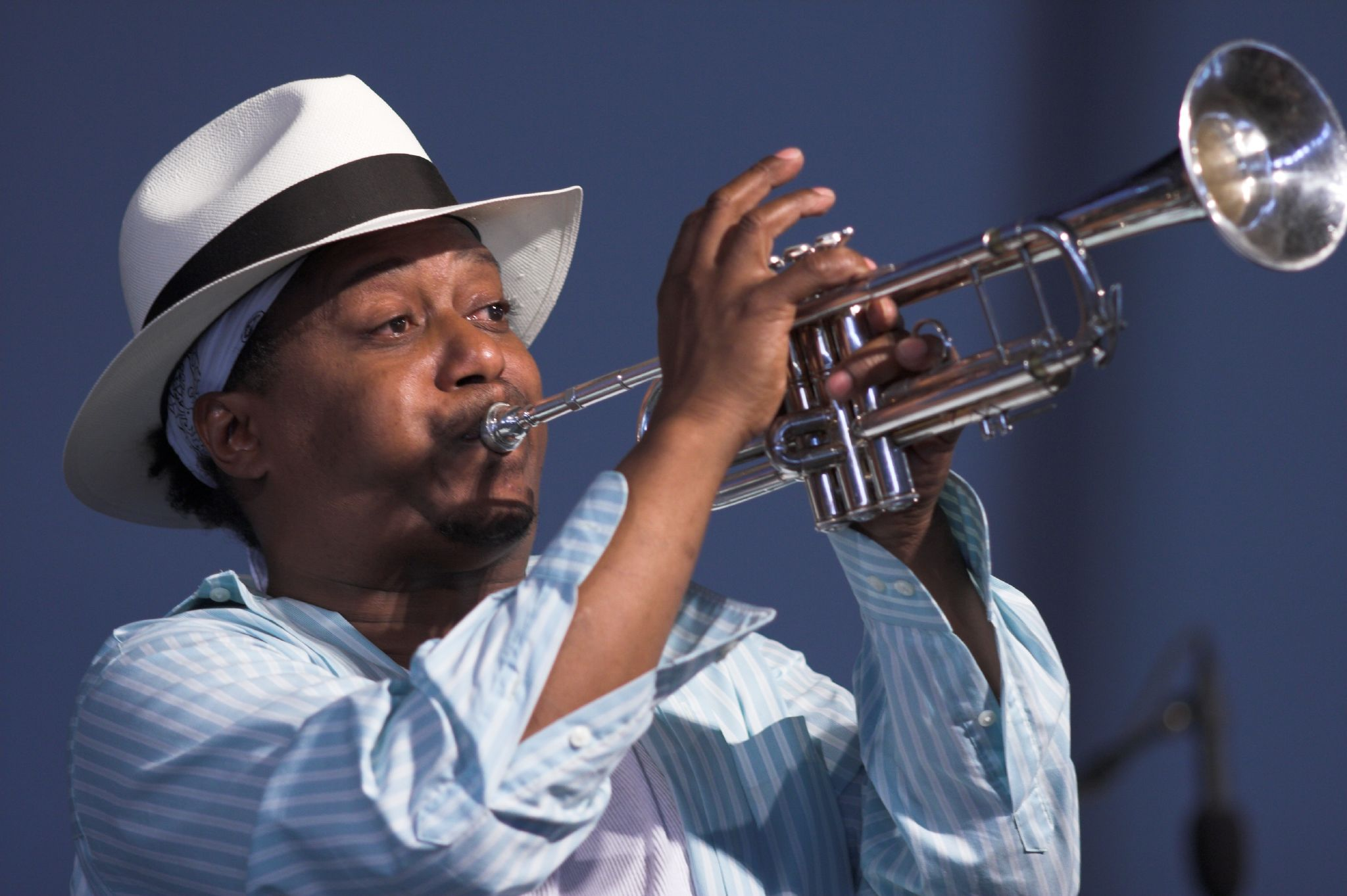
- Ruffins at the 2007 New Orleans Jazz & Heritage Festival

Background information
- Born: Kermit Ruffins; December 19, 1964 (age 61)
- Origin: New Orleans, Louisiana U.S.
- Genres: Jazz; Rhythm and blues
- Occupation: Musician
- Instruments: Trumpet vocals
- Years active: 1973–present
- Labels: Basin Street, Putumayo, Justice
- Formerly of: Rebirth Brass Band

Kermit Ruffins (born December 19, 1964) is an American jazz trumpeter, singer, and composer from New Orleans. He has been influenced by Louis Armstrong and Louis Jordan and says that the highest note he can hit on trumpet is a high C. He often accompanies his songs with his own vocals. Most of his bands perform New Orleans jazz standards though he also composes many of his own pieces. Jon Pareles of The New York Times wrote, "Mr. Ruffins is an unabashed entertainer who plays trumpet with a bright, silvery tone, sings with off-the-cuff charm and never gets too abstruse in his material."

== Early life ==
He started playing trumpet in 8th grade at Lawless Junior High School in the Ninth Ward of New Orleans. He attended Joseph S. Clark High School in the 6th Ward and St Peter Claver Church in Tremé. In high school, he played a little bit of classical music at the behest of a strict band teacher.

He developed an appreciation for cooking from his grandmother, observing her movements in the kitchen.

== Career ==
=== Rebirth Brass Band ===
Ruffins co-founded the Rebirth Brass Band in 1983 while attending Clark High School in the Tremé neighborhood. He made his first recordings with the Rebirth band in 1984. The group was inspired by The Dirty Dozen Brass Band, a band of slightly older musicians credited with bringing influences of funk and contemporary bebop into New Orleans style brass bands. Before they achieved the popularity which allowed them to play regularly in local music venues, the Rebirth often busked around the French Quarter for tips. They soon became a "house band" at the Glass House, previously the Dirty Dozen's home venue. Rebirth once had a gig in New York City at Lone Star Cafe, but they were hassled by police for having no permit when they began marching outdoors as is common practice in New Orleans.

=== Barbecue Swingers ===
Ruffins founded the Barbecue Swingers in 1992, a traditional jazz quintet. He is known for cooking on a barbecue at his shows. Every Thursday since the early 1990s, they played a show at Vaughan's Bar in the Bywater neighborhood which was very popular with both locals and visitors. His 2007 Basin Street Records release, Live at Vaughan's was recorded during one of his performances there. They currently play a regular Thursday night gig at Bullet's Sports Bar on AP Tureaud Ave.

He has also performed at hundreds of funerals during his career in the Crescent City. In 2003 the band received a nomination at the Big Easy Entertainment Awards, which recognizes local talents.

=== Other work ===
Ruffins is interviewed on screen and appears in performance footage in the 2005 documentary film Make It Funky!, which presents a history of New Orleans music and its influence on rhythm and blues, rock and roll, funk and jazz. In the film, he performs "Skokiaan" as part of a trumpet challenge with Irvin Mayfield and Troy Andrews.

He appeared as himself in HBO's Treme as a recurring character.

Ruffins also performed a rendition of The Bare Necessities for Disney's 2016 remake of The Jungle Book, alongside actor Bill Murray.

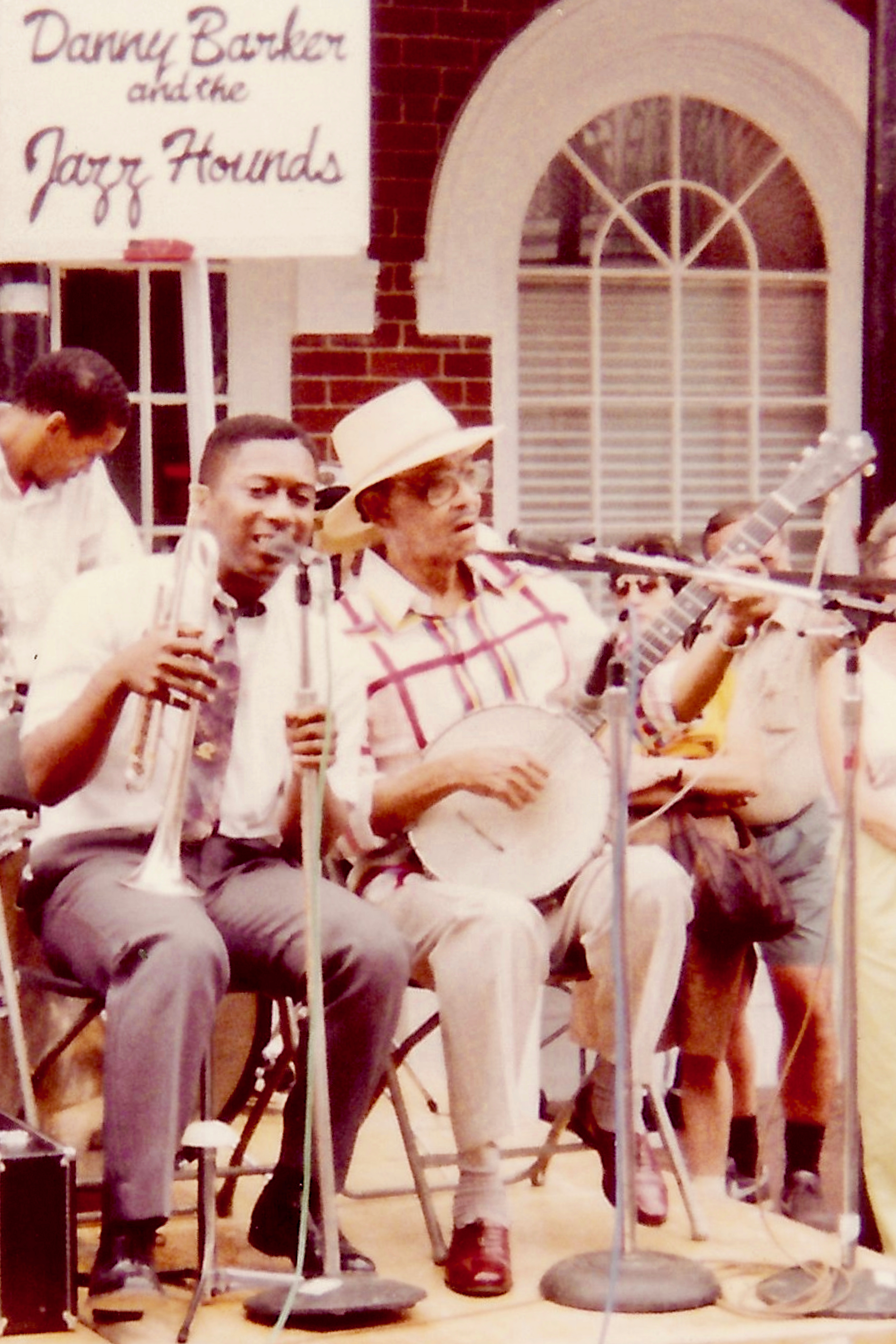
Ruffins (left) with the late Danny Barker at French Quarter Festival, circa 1990

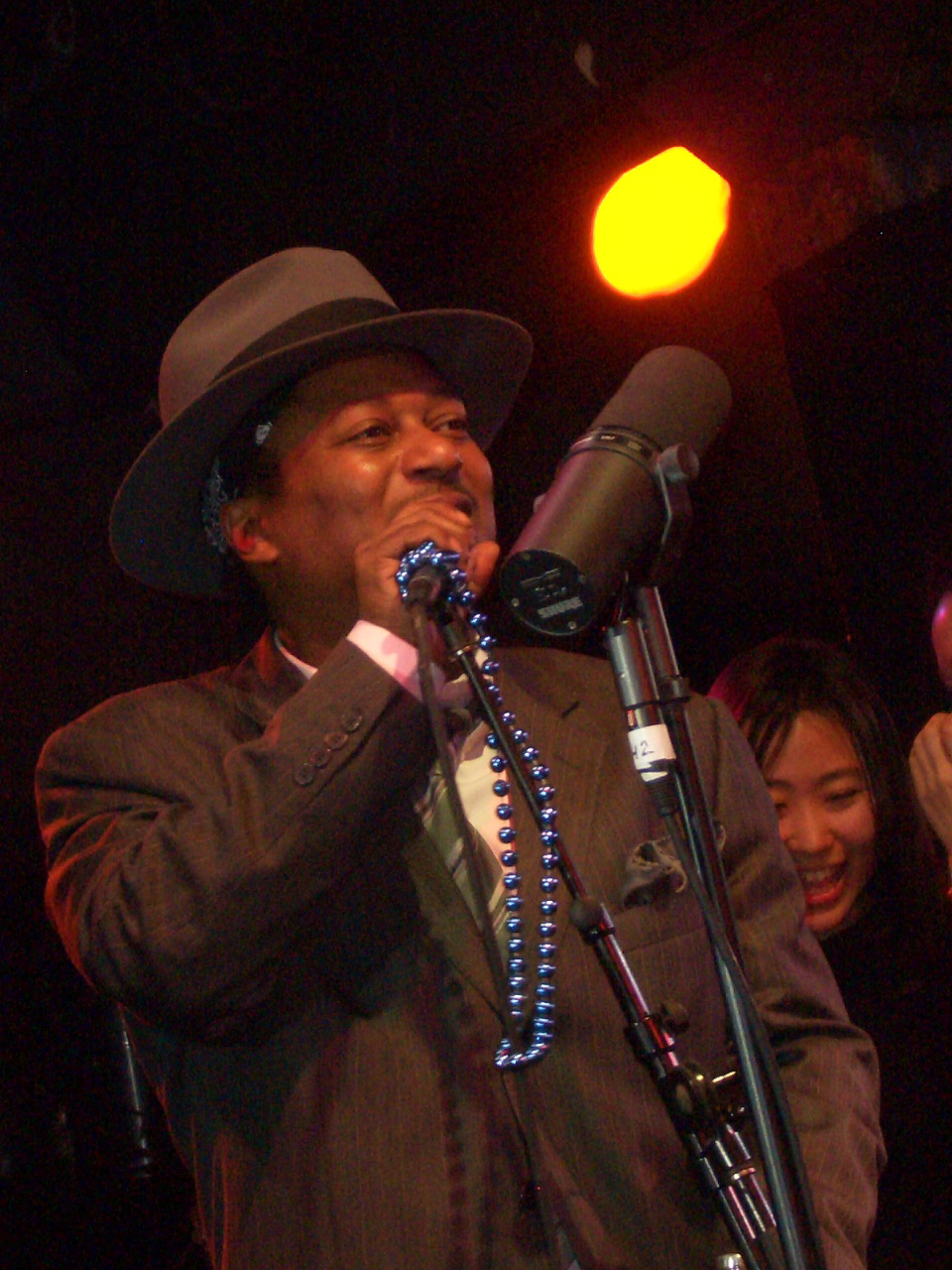
Ruffins at Tipitina's, February 2006

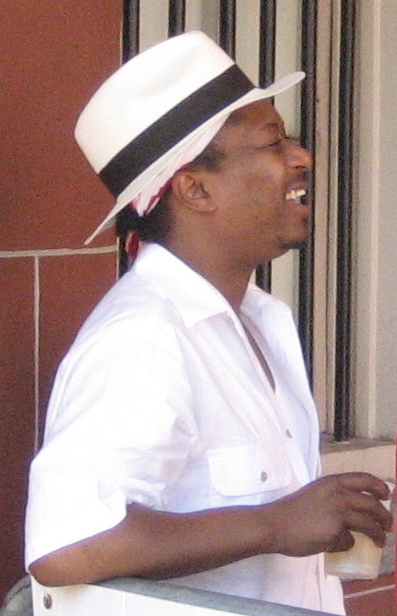
Ruffins at Old Mint, shown before a set at the Satchmo SummerFest, August 2007

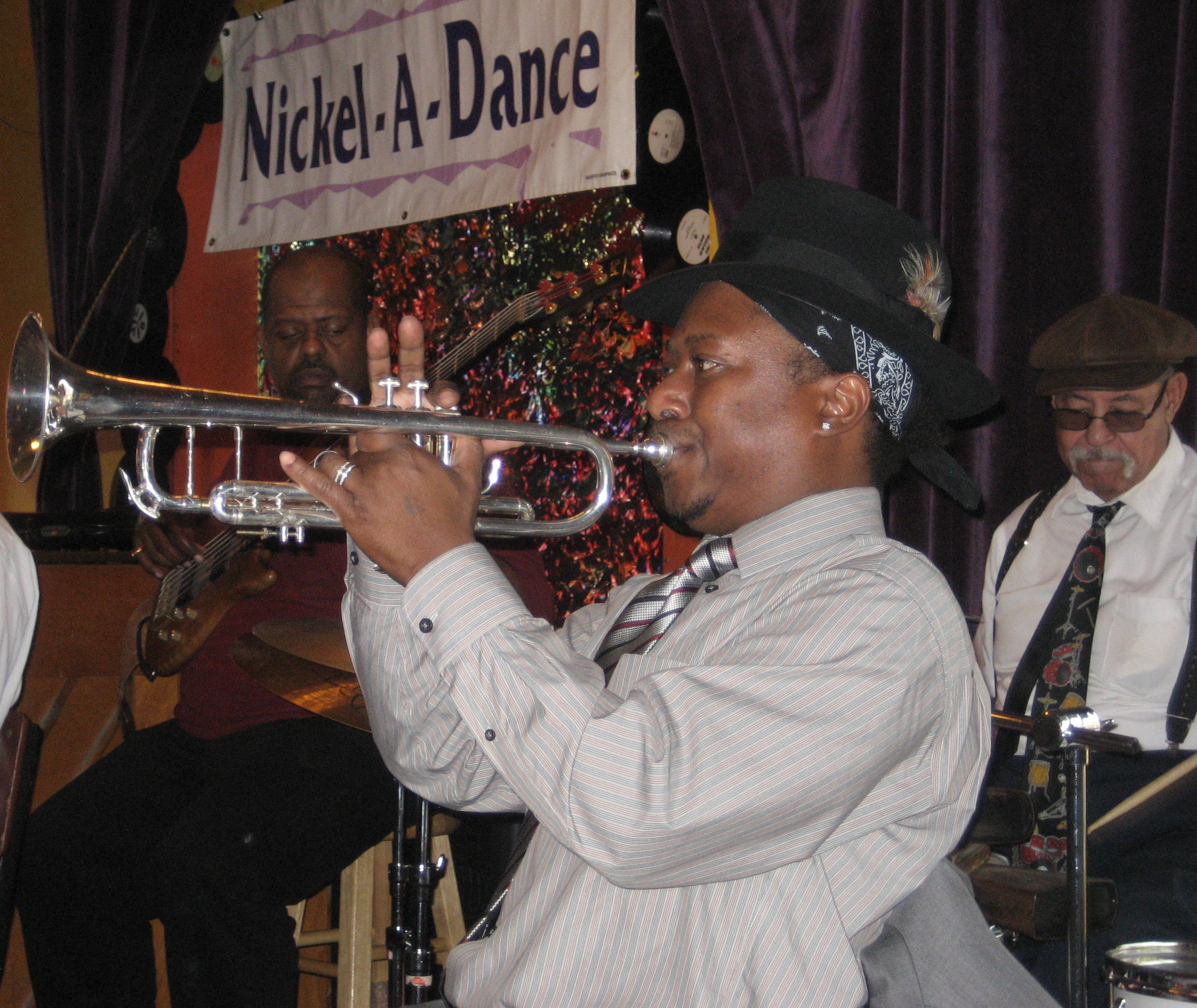
Ruffins playing at Cafe Brasil in New Orleans, November 2007

== Discography ==
Year	Album	Notes	Label
1993	World on a String	debut album	Justice
1994	The Big Butter and Egg Man	–	Justice
1996	Hold on Tight	–	Justice
1998	The Barbecue Swingers Live	–	Basin Street
1999	Swing This	–	Basin Street
2001	1533 St. Philip Street	–	Basin Street
2002	Big Easy	–	Basin Street
2005	Throwback	–	Basin Street
2007	Live at Vaughan's	–	Basin Street
2009	Livin' a Treme Life	–	Basin Street
2009	Have a Crazy Cool Christmas	–	Basin Street
2010	Happy Talk	–	Basin Street
2013	We Partyin' Traditional Style	–	Basin Street
2015	#imsoneworleans	–	Basin Street
2017	A Beautiful World	–	Basin Street

== Filmography ==
- Make It Funky! (2005), documentary film
- New Orleans Music in Exile (2006), documentary film
- After the Catch (2007)
- Treme (2010)
- The Real World New Orleans (2010)
- The Jungle Book (2016)

== Awards ==
- 2003 – Offbeat's Best of the Beat Awards in Best Traditional Jazz Band or Performer for Kermit Ruffins and the Barbecue Swingers

== See also ==
- List of people from New Orleans, Louisiana
- Rebirth Brass Band
- Treme (TV Series)
