= Anthony Lacen =

African-American jazz tuba player

Anthony "Tuba Fats" Lacen (September 15, 1950 – January 11, 2004) was a jazz tubist and band leader. Tuba Fats was New Orleans' most famous tuba player and played traditional New Orleans jazz and blues for over 40 years.

== Biography ==
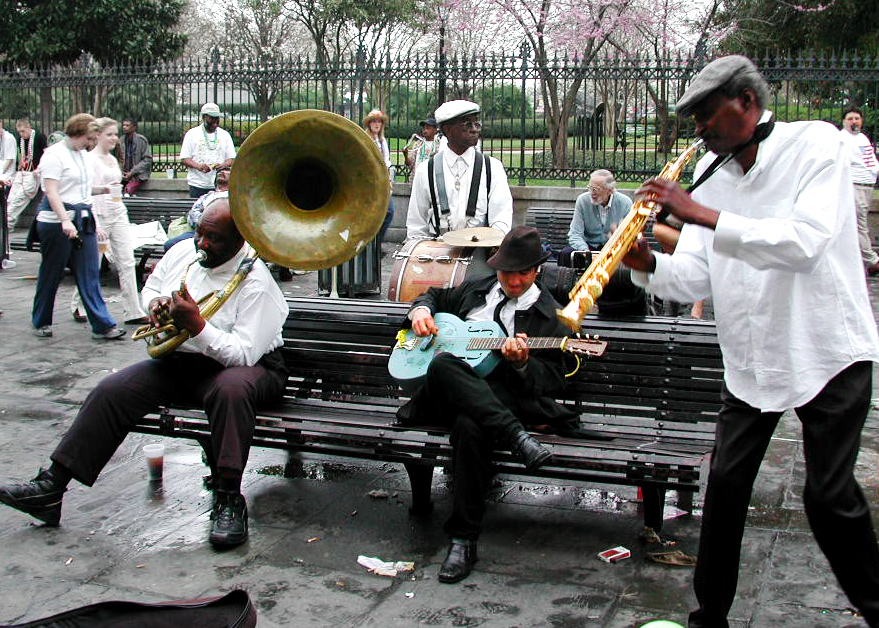
"Tuba Fats" at left busking with a small band in Jackson Square, New Orleans in 2001

Of African American heritage, Anthony Lacen was born, spent most of his life, and died in New Orleans, Louisiana. His music also took him on a number of tours of Europe, Asia, Australia, and South America.

He was known for many years to lead a band playing for tips in Jackson Square in the French Quarter, where he gave much encouragement to younger musicians. He played professionally with brass bands such as the Young Tuxedo, E. Gibson, Doc Paulin, Onward, Algiers, Treme, and Olympia Brass Bands, and with his own band, Tuba Fats & the Chosen Few Brass Band. Tuba Fats made many important jazz recordings; notably those under his own name on the Jazz Crusade label.

Lacen died of an apparent heart attack on January 11, 2004 and was buried on January 18 after a jazz funeral.

== Personal life ==
Tuba Fats was first married to Barbara Lacen-Keller in 1980. He later married the blues shouter "Lady Linda" Young (d. 1997), with whom he often toured in Europe.

== Discography ==
- After You've Gone (with Linda Young) (Jazz Crusade, 1985)
- Street Music (Jazz Crusade, 1986 & 2003)
- A Jazz Gumbo Vols. 1 & 2 (with Linda Young) (Jazz Crusade, 1993)
- In the Gutter (Jazz Crusade, 1997)
- Big Bill Bissonnette's International Jazz Band Vols. 1 & 2 (Jazz Crusade, 1997)
- Chosen Few Jazzmen (Jazz Crusade, 2003)
- The Legendary Tuba Fats (A Wise and Barking Production, 2003)
