= Krewe du Vieux =

New Orleans Mardi Gras krewe

- Abbreviation: KdV
- Named after: Vieux Carré
- Formation: 1987; 39 years ago
- Founders: Craig "Spoons" Johnson, Don Marshall
- Founded at: New Orleans, Louisiana
- Type: Carnival krewe
- Location: Marigny, New Orleans, Louisiana
- Website: kreweduvieux.org

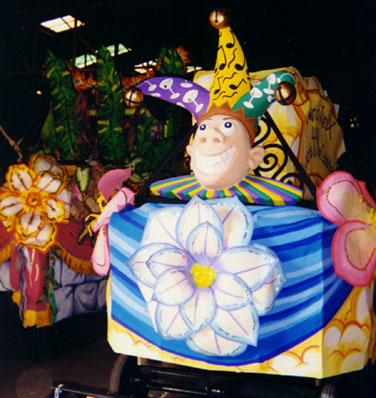
Krewe du Vieux title float.

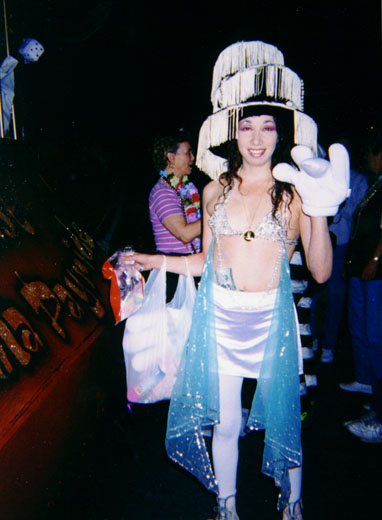
Marching krewe member.

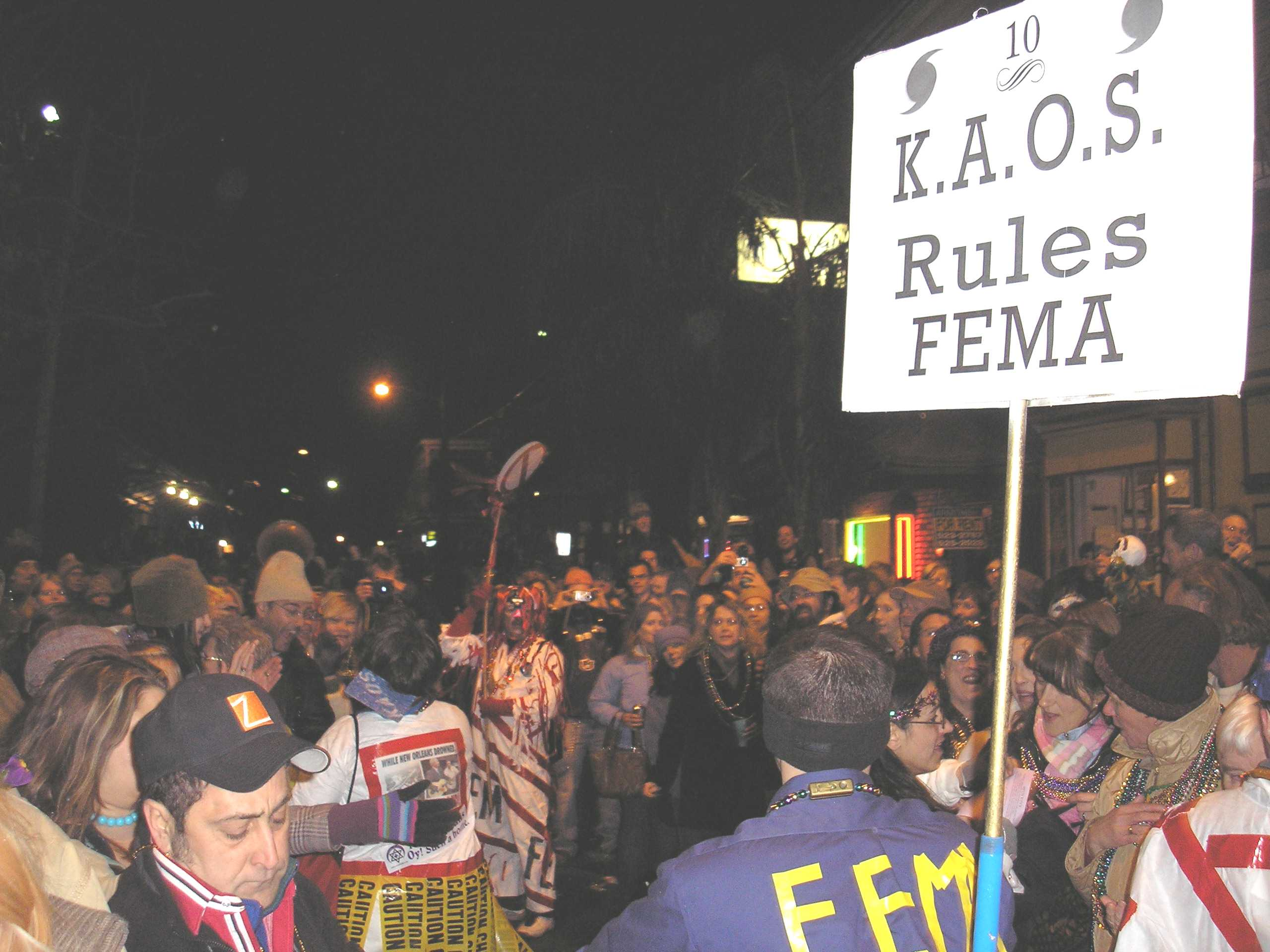
Parading down Frenchmen St.

The Krewe du Vieux is a New Orleans Mardi Gras krewe more fully known as the Krewe du Vieux Carré.

== History and formation ==
The parade begins in the Marigny and slowly meanders its way through the Vieux Carre (a term for the city's French Quarter). It is one of the earliest parades of the New Orleans Carnival calendar, and is noted for wild satirical and adult themes, as well as for showcasing a large number of New Orleans' best brass bands.

The Krewe du Vieux was established in 1987 as a replacement of the Krewe of Clones, which flopped after the city tried to make it more respectable for visitors who stayed on in the city after the 1986 Super Bowl. The Krewe de Vieux is actually an amalgamation of several smaller semi-independent krewes (or sub-krewes) that pool their resources together for parade permits and other expenses and obligations. Several of the sub-krewes predate the Krewe du Vieux, originating as walking clubs or as sub-krewes of the defunct Krewe of Clones in the 1970s and early 1980s. The history behind the parade states that the ruling class of New Orleans wagered if they gave the common people one day a year to go crazy and mock the elites then the satiated masses would allow them to maintain control for the remainder of the year. Participation in the parade is open to anyone who is part of a sub-affiliated krewe in good standing.

== Parade ==
The Krewe du Vieux is perhaps simultaneously the most individualistic and the most traditional of all New Orleans parading krewes. It has no large tractor-pulled floats like the larger krewes, using only old-style, small, human-drawn or mule-drawn floats interspersed with marchers on foot. Krewe du Vieux has only live music, hiring some of the city's best brass bands to march with them. The floats are handmade and decorated by members of the respective sub-krewes, often with themes satirizing local politics and customs, sometimes of a bawdy nature — in such aspects arguably closer to early-19th-century Carnival traditions than any other Krewe currently parading. The Krewe du Vieux is the only Krewe still allowed to parade through the French Quarter (other than some small walking Krewes on Mardi Gras Day); krewes with larger floats have been prohibited in the narrow streets of the old town since the 1970s. The parade is noted for its sophisticated floats, witty debauchery, open mockery of topical municipal campaigns, and wildly entertaining levels of tastelessness.

== Parade theme ==
Krewe du Vieux typically selects a parade theme pulling from ideas of political satire, sexuality, and local culture.

Year	Theme	Royalty
2026	Krewe du Vieux Saves the Wet Glands	Franziska Trautmann
2025	Krewe du Vieux is Revolting	Little Freddie King
2024	Artificial Ignorance	Isaac Toups
2023	Krewe du Vieux Beats Off	Jan Ramsey
2022	Vaxxed & Confused	Dr. Jennifer Avegno
2021	Krewe du Vieux Has No Taste	Those Who Care (Healthcare providers, teachers, etc. who provide care during the pandemic)
2020	Erection 2020	BB St. Roman
2019	City of Yes, Yes, oh God Yes!!	Walter "Wolfman" Washington
2018	Bienville's Wet Dream	Richard Campanella
2017	Crass Menagerie	Bunny Matthews
2016	XXX	Big Freedia
2015	Krewe du Vieux Begs for Change	Dr. James Aiken
2014	Where the Vile Things Are	John Barry
2013	Krewe du Vieux Comes Early	Bethany Bultman
2012	Crimes Against Nature	Deon Haywood
2011	25 Years Wasted	Don Marshall
2010	Fired Up	Dr. John
2009	Krewe du Vieux's Stimulus Package	Frankie Ford
2008	Magical Misery Tour	Ronald Lewis
2007	Habitat for Insanity	Chris Rose
2006	C'est Levee	Walter "Mr. Bill" Williams
2005	What Would Krewe du Vieux Do?	Al "Carnival Time" Johnson
2004	The Quest for Immorality	Coleen Salley
2003	Off the Record	Uncle Lionel Batiste
2002	Depraved New World	Andrei Codrescu
2001	2001: A Space Fallacy	Ernie K-Doe
2000	da idiots & da oddities	Walt Handlesman
1999	Urban Myths	Ray “Plaine” Kern
1998	Souled Down the River	Irma Thomas with Grand Duchesses Marcia Ball and Tracy Nelson
1997	Krewe du Vieux Goes Deep	Buddy Diliberto
1996	Krewe du Vieux Achieves "Decade-ence"	Ronnie Virgets
1995	Unnaturally New Orleans	GiO
1994	The Ballot of New Orleans	Danny Barker
1993	Posthumorously Yours	Henri Schindler
1992	Krewe du Vieux Rights the News	Angus Lind
1991	Lost Conventions	Becky Allen and Ricky Graham
1990	Krewe du Vieux Smells Something Fishy	Al Scramuzza
1989	Krewe du Vieux Predicts	Lois Simbach
1988	Krewe du Vieux Eats Out	Chef Paul Prudhomme
1987	Odd Couples	Charmaine Neville

Kings and Queens of the Krewe du Vieux take their participation very seriously. Henri Schindler, who rode as King Sarcophagus I in 1993, showcased how far some "royal members" go in their celebration. Schindler designed his float and gathered an extensive court of royals as his leading entourage. While riding along the parade route, he stopped in front of the Boston Club--a traditional stop for toasting the Kings of Carnival--to lay a funeral wreath.
