= Factor Prize for Southern Art =

1858 Prize for Contemporary Southern Art
- Description: Recognizes artists whose work contributes to a new understanding of the South
- Country: United States
- Presented by: Gibbes Museum of Art & Society 1858
- Formerly called: Factor Prize for Southern Art

The Factor Prize for Southern Art, now renamed the 1858 Prize for Contemporary Southern Art, was established in 2007 with a five year commitment by Elizabeth and Mallory Factor and the Gibbes Museum of Art. It was given annually with a cash prize of $10,000, to "acknowledge an artist whose work contributes to a new understanding of the South" and was the most generous prize of its type in the region. Since 2013 the prize has been awarded by Society 1858.

== History and procedure ==
The prize may be awarded to an artist who has already produced a body of significant work or whose work shows considerable promise. Eligible artists are those who reside, work or are from Alabama, Arkansas, Florida, Georgia, Louisiana, Mississippi, North Carolina, South Carolina, Tennessee, or Virginia.

Unlike any other award of its type, the design of the Prize creates an archive of information about Southern artists that can be used by curators, collectors, academicians and the public. Nominations will form the basis of this searchable online archive of Southern artists commencing in early 2008.

The shortlist for the inaugural prize in 2008 was Jose Alvarez, Radcliff Bailey, William Christenberry, Henri Schindler, Philip Simmons, Stacy Lynn Waddell and Jeff Whetstone. On May 19, 2008, the prize was awarded to Jeff Whetstone, a North Carolina photographer.

== Prizewinners ==
=== 1858 Prize for Contemporary Southern Art ===
- 2014 Sonya Clark (fiber and mixed media )

=== Factor Prize ===
- 2012 John Westmark (painting)
- 2011 Patrick Dougherty (sculpture)
- 2010 Radcliffe Bailey (mixed media)
- 2009 Stephen Marc (digital photographic montage}
- 2008 Jeff Whetstone (photography}

== Sources ==
- "Gibbes Museum of Art Announces Southern Art Prize". Art Knowledge News.
- 2008 prize shortlist
- inaugural 2008 prize

== See also ==
- Gibbes Museum of Art
- Mallory Factor
