= Chris Rose (journalist) =

American journalist

Chris Reynolds Rose
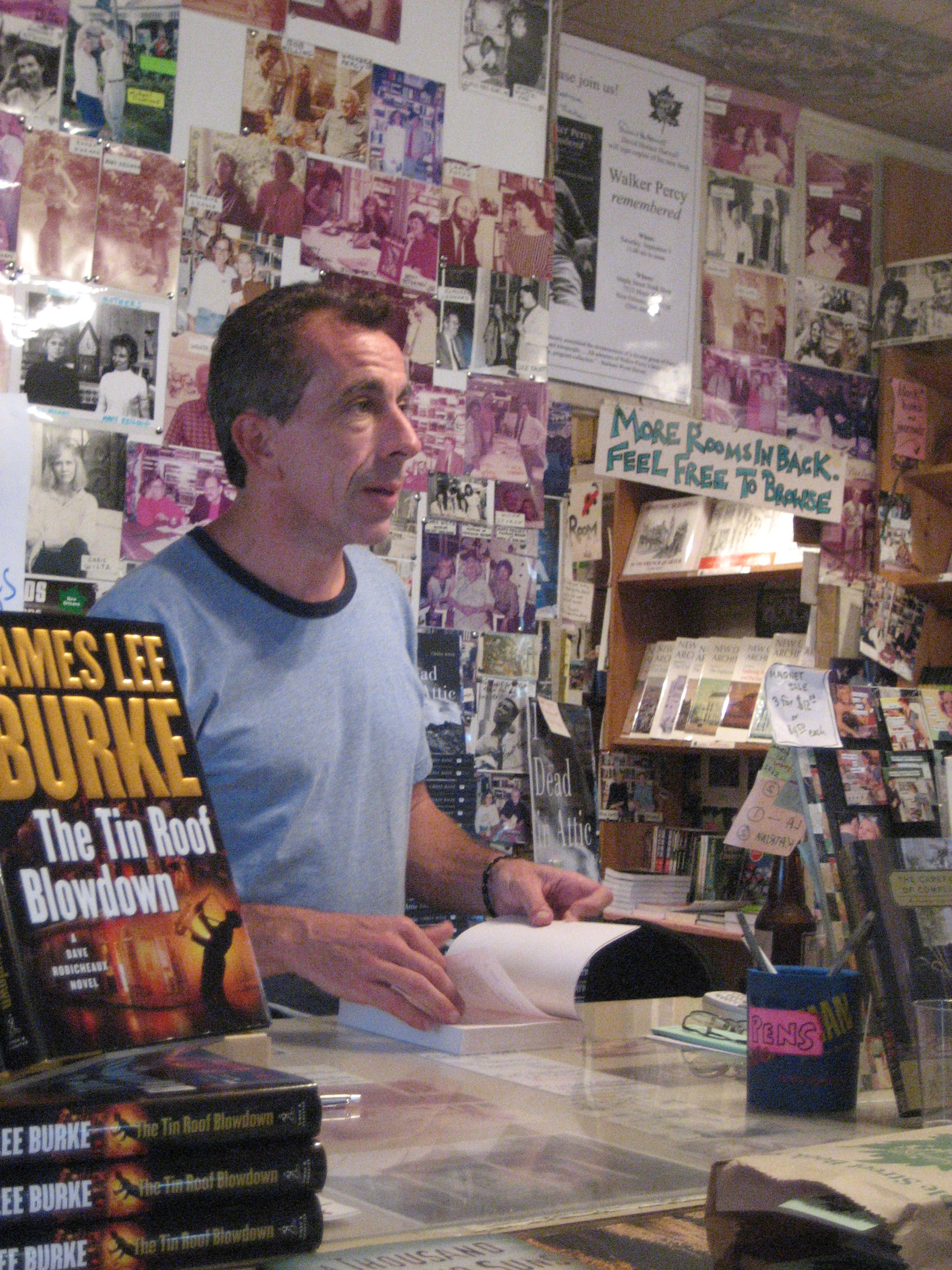
- Rose reading at a book signing, August 2007
- Citizenship: American
- Education: Georgetown Preparatory School
- Alma mater: University of Wisconsin–Madison
- Writing career
- Genre: non-fiction

Chris Rose is a New York Times Best-Selling New Orleans, Louisiana, writer and journalist.

Though once best known for his light-hearted pieces in the Times-Picayune, he gained greater attention for his chronicles of the effect of Hurricane Katrina on New Orleans since 2005.

== Life ==
Rose graduated from the Georgetown Preparatory School in Rockville, Maryland, in 1978 and received a journalism degree from the University of Wisconsin–Madison in 1982. After a stint as a staff writer at The Washington Post, he joined the Times-Picayune as a crime reporter in 1984. Over the years, he has covered national politics, economics, Southern regionalism, pop culture, and New Orleans nightlife, traditions, lifestyles and entertainment.

Post-Katrina, Rose gained notoriety and accolades as he chronicled the personal and public struggles of the disaster-stricken area. Rose's column regularly appeared at his "New Orleans stories" Times-Picayune web site. He returned to the theme in various ways, as in satirizing the 2008–2009 e-mail controversies swelling around New Orleans mayor Ray Nagin and Councilwoman Stacy Head.

Rose left the paper in late 2009 and joined the New Orleans alternative weekly paper, Gambit Weekly, in mid February 2010. He moved to WVUE Fox News 8 a year later, where he delivered his pungent commentary on New Orleans life by video and column, up until his abrupt and arguably controversial termination in March 2013.

After his dismissals from Gambit and WVUE, Rose found work as restaurant waiter. Chris Rose has also written for Rouses, a grocery store chain based in Louisiana. Rose wrote for the chain's trade magazine, contributing articles on food related topics.

In 2016, Rose became a licensed tour guide. His walking tour mainly covered the music history of New Orleans and Louisiana.

Rose is the author of 1 Dead in Attic, a collection of stories recounting the first four harrowing months of life in New Orleans after Hurricane Katrina. The book went on to become a New York Times Bestseller and garnered a number of accolades.

== Awards and nominations ==
Rose was a finalist for the Pulitzer Prize for Distinguished Commentary in 2006, and was awarded a share in the Times-Picayune staff's Pulitzer Prize for Public Service for his contributions. He was a finalist for the 2006 Michael Kelly Award.

Rose reigned as King of the Krewe du Vieux for the 2007 New Orleans Mardi Gras season.

== Personal life ==
Rose is divorced from Kelly Gluth Rose, a native New Orleanian. They have three children. The family adopted a dog left homeless by Hurricane Rita and named the dog Luna Biscuit (which, he jokes, is French for Moon Pie). In the 2007 edition of 1 Dead In Attic, Rose revealed that he and his wife had separated.

In October 2006, Rose wrote about taking anti-depressants after suffering from anxiety and depression after Hurricane Katrina.

In August 2025, Rose disclosed that he has been diagnosed with end-stage cirrhosis, and is estranged from his three adult children. He has struggled with opiate addiction, alcohol dependency, and physical and mental health issues, leading to career instability, damaged personal relationships, and loss of financial security.

After 35 years of residence, he left New Orleans in 2021. Rose currently lives part-time in a tent in Swallow Falls State Park, Maryland, where he has taken a volunteer position as a "camp host", allowing him to live there for months, in exchange for helping to maintain the park and answer visitor questions. He returns to visit New Orleans in winter, but does not live in the city.

Rose has stated that while he does not currently write, he may return to the craft, but is finding it difficult.

== Works ==
- 1 Dead in Attic: After Katrina. Simon & Schuster. August 4, 2015. ISBN 978-1-4391-2624-0.

== See also ==
- Ed Blakely
- Jacquelyn Brechtel Clarkson
- Stacy Head
- William J. Jefferson
- Angus Lind
- Shelley Stephenson Midura
- Ray Nagin
- Sheila Stroup
