= Stacy Lynn Waddell =

American artist

- Born: 1966 (age 59–60); Washington, DC
- Known for: Painting
- Website: stacylynnwaddell.com

Stacy Lynn Waddell (born 1966 Washington, DC) is an American artist.

== Education ==
She attended North Carolina State University and the University of North Carolina at Chapel Hill.

== Awards and recognition ==
She was a finalist for the Factor Prize for Southern Art in 2008, and a recipient of a Joan Mitchell Painters and Sculptors Grant in 2010.

== Exhibitions (selection) ==
In 2016-17, Waddell contributed work to the exhibition Southern Accent: Seeking the American South in Contemporary Art, which began at the Nasher Museum of Art at Duke University, Durham, North Carolina, and traveled to the Speed Art Museum in Louisville, Kentucky. Waddell was included in the 2019 traveling exhibition Young, Gifted, and Black: The Lumpkin-Boccuzzi Family Collection of Contemporary Art. In 2023, Waddell's work was featured in the Spirit in the Land exhibition and accompanying catalog organized by the Nasher Museum of Art at Duke University, Durham, North Carolina. The show is traveling to the Pérez Art Museum Miami, Florida, in 2024.

=== Collections ===
Her work is in the collection of the Studio Museum in Harlem, New York.
