= Lionel Batiste =

American jazz, and blues musician

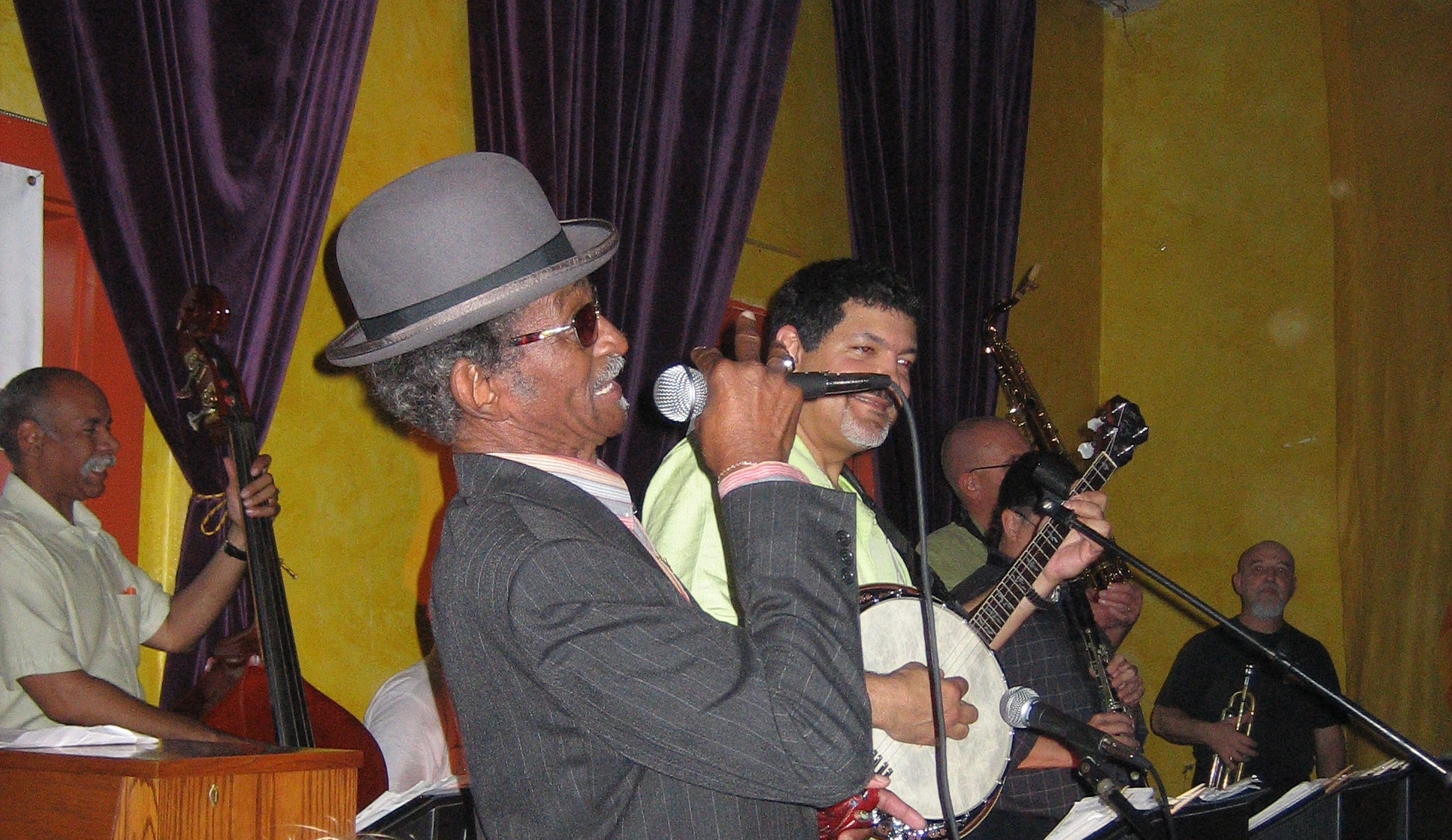
- "Uncle" Lionel Batiste (in derby hat) with "Papa" Don Vappie (with banjo)

Background information
- Also known as: "Uncle" Lionel Batiste
- Born: Lionel Batiste; February 11, 1931; New Orleans, Louisiana, US
- Died: July 8, 2012 (aged 81)
- Genres: Jazz, blues
- Occupation: Singer
- Instruments: Vocals, bass drum

"Uncle" Lionel Paul Batiste Sr. (February 11, 1931 – July 8, 2012) was an American jazz and blues musician and singer from New Orleans.

== Biography ==
He began his music career at the age of 11 playing bass drum with the Square Deal Social & Pleasure Club. He was the bass drummer, vocalist and assistant leader of the Treme Brass Band; known for his kazoo playing and singing as well, and has recorded a CD as a vocalist.

Besides inspiring younger musicians with his playing, he served as a role model to many of them: trumpeter Kermit Ruffins calls Batiste his "total influence," saying that Batiste "taught [him] how to act, how to dress, how to feel about life." Internationally, Batiste has served as leader of the daily Moldejazz parade since 2000. He was king of the Krewe du Vieux for 2003.

Batiste died in 2012 and had a Catholic funeral at the Mahalia Jackson Theater of the Performing Arts.

== Collaborations ==
With Elvis Costello

- Spike (Warner Bros. Records, 1989)
- Mighty Like a Rose (Warner Bros. Records, 1991)
