= Deon Haywood =

American human rights activist

Deon Haywood (born April 4, 1968 in New Orleans) is an American human rights defender, activist, educator, and director noted for her work combating discrimination against Black women, the criminalization of sex workers, adverse living conditions against the working poor, and limited access to HIV healthcare for residents of the American South. She is the executive director of the social justice non-profit, Women With A Vision.

== Career ==
As a member of Women With Vision (WWAV)—which was co-founded by her mother Catherine Haywood and Danita Muse in 1989 as a grassroots collective to halt the spread of HIV/AIDS in communities of color—Deon Haywood helped connect those living with HIV or drug addictions to medical care and recovery programs while also advocating for alleviation of homelessness and affordability issues throughout the rapidly gentrifying post-Hurricane Katrina New Orleans. In 2008 she assumed executive directorship of Women With A Vision (WWAV) with the intent to overturn New Orleans' recently resurrected 203-year-old Crimes Against Nature Statute (CANS). The law, which was originally created to penalize gay sex, was expanded to require anyone prosecuted for prostitution within the past 20 years to register as a sex offender. Beyond losing the ability to live anywhere near schools and having to identify oneself to neighbors, the law also placed sex offender stamps on the state identification card of anyone prosecuted under the statute.

Tackling CANS head on, Haywood formed the NO Justice Project in 2009 to raise awareness about the "scarlet letter" sanction the law placed upon already indigent women. In addition to making the case that CANS made it impossible for these women to find employment or housing with a sex offender registration hanging over their heads, Haywood also built a network of challenges to the statute by organizing protests, raising awareness about the statute's undue burden, and filing legal cases. Pushing the fact that 79% percent of those forced to register under the statute were Black, the NO Justice Project's agenda was given even greater precedence after the United States Department of Justice initiated an investigation that found the New Orleans Police Department had consistently practiced discriminatory policing “so severe and so divergent from nationally reported data” that it epitomized “a violation of constitutional and statutory law".

Prosecution under CANS was left to the discretion of arresting officers who had complete power over whether to apply the statute or to level lesser misdemeanor charges. Overwhelmingly, those targeted by the NOPD were poor Black and transgender women who were frequently baited and arrested by undercover officers even when sex was not offered. Compounding this issue was that though women represented 32% of new HIV diagnoses in 2009, Black women were diagnosed with HIV at rates 11 times greater than their white counterparts. These figures, reported by the Louisiana Department of Health, worsened in 2011.

On February 15, 2011, WWAV and its cooperating legal team initiated a lawsuit in the Eastern District of Louisiana on behalf of nine people who had been forced to register as sex offenders through CANS. A month later the NO Justice Project partnered with Representative Charmaine Marchand-Stiaes to revert convictions under the statute to the level of a misdemeanor. That June, the bill was signed into law by then Governor Bobby Jindal. Continuing in federal court, in 2013 the original case was finally settled in favor of the more than 700 people who had been placed on the registry with the stipulation that the Superintendent of the Louisiana State Police agree to remove anyone registered as a sex offender solely because of conviction/s of Crime Against Nature by solicitation.

== Arson attack and continued activism ==
In May 2012, while the CANS case was still waging, Women With A Vision's building was burned down in what the New Orleans Fire Department categorized an aggravated arson. Though no one was injured in the fire, WWAV's equipment and work space were entirely destroyed forcing the organization to temporarily relocate to a local church. News of the attack was reported in major headlines as a hate crime. Following the fire, Haywood doubled down on rebuilding and supporting Black LGBTQ advocacy in Mississippi and Louisiana. This work was assisted by a $100,000 grant from the Elton John AIDS Foundation in recognition of WWAV's success in pinpointing the localized crossover between AIDS, health stigmas, and inequality in the South.

This included dismantling misconceptions that the HIV epidemic was contained, exhorting Governor Jindal to expand Medicaid through available funds provided by the Affordable Care Act to fight the epidemic, and investing in alternatives to abstinence only sex education. Additionally Haywood pushed for providing treatment services to people suffering from addiction, arguing that it is a public health issue. She deepened this point by providing studies that proved treatment offered the most effective way to stem Louisiana's devastating HIV transmission rates while also highlighting that in refusing to address the issue of addiction, the state was essentially fueling the epidemic through neglect. Because it lacked no strategic response besides HIV criminalization and discrimination which included denying services to members of the LGBTQ community, New Orleans was eventually labeled America's Ground Zero For HIV.

== Combating poverty ==
In advocating for the working poor, Haywood has frequently targeted rising levels of gentrification which actively displaces natives in the name of post-Hurricane Katrina driven business development and recovery by passing ordinances to outlaw traditional practices, such as playing live music. Appearing on the Melissa Harris Perry Show on MSNBC in 2014 and 2015, she established connections between sex work, consent, and legality while also speaking of the need to provide women with tools to build solvent investments in their lives.

That same year she made the case for decriminalizing prostitution in The New York Times by showing that sex work is frequently the only viable source of income for women, particularly single-parent households attempting to pay rent, without the means or education to advocate for themselves and their families. In fighting against criminalization of sex work, Haywood also pointed to long term ramifications of serving time for sex work for women and their families, including barriers to legal forms of employment, increased risk for HIV, and children who end up in foster care. She concluded that decriminalization allows sex workers to speak against abuse without fear of prosecution or retribution from pimps or abusers.

In 2017 she was one of 24 leaders of color in the LGBTQ movement to contribute to the Declaration of Liberation, a racial justice strategy for tackling the HIV epidemic. She was appointed to Mayor LaToya Cantrell's Human Relations Commission's Advisory Committee of New Orleans in 2018. In 2019 she raised support against Bill 184's ban on abortion after 6 weeks, equating its passage with an attack on a woman's bodily autonomy. Following the bill's passage she vowed to push for its repeal by inspiring voters.

== Awards ==
In 2010 and 2011 Haywood was spotlighted by TheBody.com for her work in the HIV/AIDS Community as a "Person Who Makes A Difference". She was made Queen of Krewe du Vieux for the 2012 Mardi Gras with the theme of the parade mirroring her "CANS" victory: "Crimes Against Nature". She was named a "Health Hero" by BET in 2013. That same year she was made the representative for the southern United States to The Human Rights Defenders in Dublin. The following year she was honored by Planned Parenthood for Black History Month, and in 2015 she was honored with the Kiyoshi Kuromiya Award and a grant from the Elton John Aid Foundation.

In 2016 Haywood was awarded a Public Voices Fellowship by the Ms. Foundation for Women, the Ben Smith Award from The ACLU and she was designated a Dream Keeper for Black History month, again by Planned Parenthood in 2017. In 2018 she was awarded a fellowship by the Rockwood Leadership Institute and made a Flame Thrower Awardee by The Red Door Foundation. In 2019 she was named a "Champion of Pride" by The Advocate and awarded the Gloria Award from Gloria Steinem for her work "igniting change in communities to ensure equity and opportunity for all women".

== Personal life ==
Haywood is a lesbian. She is married to her longtime partner, Shaquita Borden.
