= Henri Schindler =

American designer (born 1940)

- Born: December 26, 1940 (age 85); New Orleans, Louisiana, U.S.
- Occupations: Author and Designer
- Writing career
- Genres: New Orleans history, Carnival

Henri Schindler (born December 26, 1940) is an American Mardi Gras historian and float designer.

== Early life ==
Henri Schindler grew up in Algiers Point, directly across the Mississippi River from the French Quarter. His earliest memory was that of a Mardi Gras parade when he was five year's old, after the festival had returned to the streets after World War II. For the past 40 years he has worked with many of the traditional old-line krewes in designing their floats.

Louis Andrews Fischer, his mentor and parade designer, took him under her wings and made a point of introducing him to the important krewe captains, so that he could become her successor as a designer. Schindler's apprenticeship began in 1971 when he ran into Fischer by chance on Ash Wednesday and helped carry her groceries home. On a table he saw watercolor designs of parade floats that he had just seen on the streets. He continued to work on Carnival designs and collect memorabilia after her death.

== Career ==
"Carnival is the consuming passion of my life", admits Schindler. He is most famous for designing the floats for Rex, one of the oldest traditional Mardi Gras krewes, for many decades. In 1997, he published Mardi Gras New Orleans at the prestigious Paris publisher Flammarion. This book outlines the history of Mardi Gras or Carnival in New Orleans and focuses on the Golden Age during the latter part of the 19th century. He followed this publication with a series of books concentrating on the treasures of Mardi Gras, such as elaborate Carnival ball invitations and float design. In 2013, Schindler received a Lifetime Achievement Award from the New Orleans Arts Council.

== Society of Saint Anne ==
Henri Schindler, along with his partner Paul Poché and close friend Jon Newlin, founded the Society of Saint Anne, a walking krewe that processes each Mardi Gras Day from the Bywater neighborhood through the French Quarter to Canal Street to watch the Rex Parade. Known for its elaborate and eccentric costumes, the group grows in number as the parade approaches Canal Street. During the AIDS crisis, friends carried ashes of their dearly departed and said their final farewells at the Mississippi River as they spread the ashes across the muddy waters.

== Publications ==
- Mardi Gras New Orleans, Paris: Flammarion, 1997
- Mardi Gras Treasures: Invitations of the Golden Age, New Orleans: Pelican Publishing, 2000
- Mardi Gras Treasures: Float Designs of the Golden Age, New Orleans: Pelican Publishing, 2001
- Mardi Gras Treasures: Costume Designs of the Golden Age, New Orleans: Pelican Publishing, 2002
- Mardi Gras Treasures: Jewelry of the Golden Age, New Orleans: Pelican Publishing, 2006
- Foreword by Henri Schindler - Unveiling the Muse: The Lost History of Gay Carnival in New Orleans by Howard Philips Smith
