= Society of Saint Anne =

New Orleans Mardi Gras marching krewe

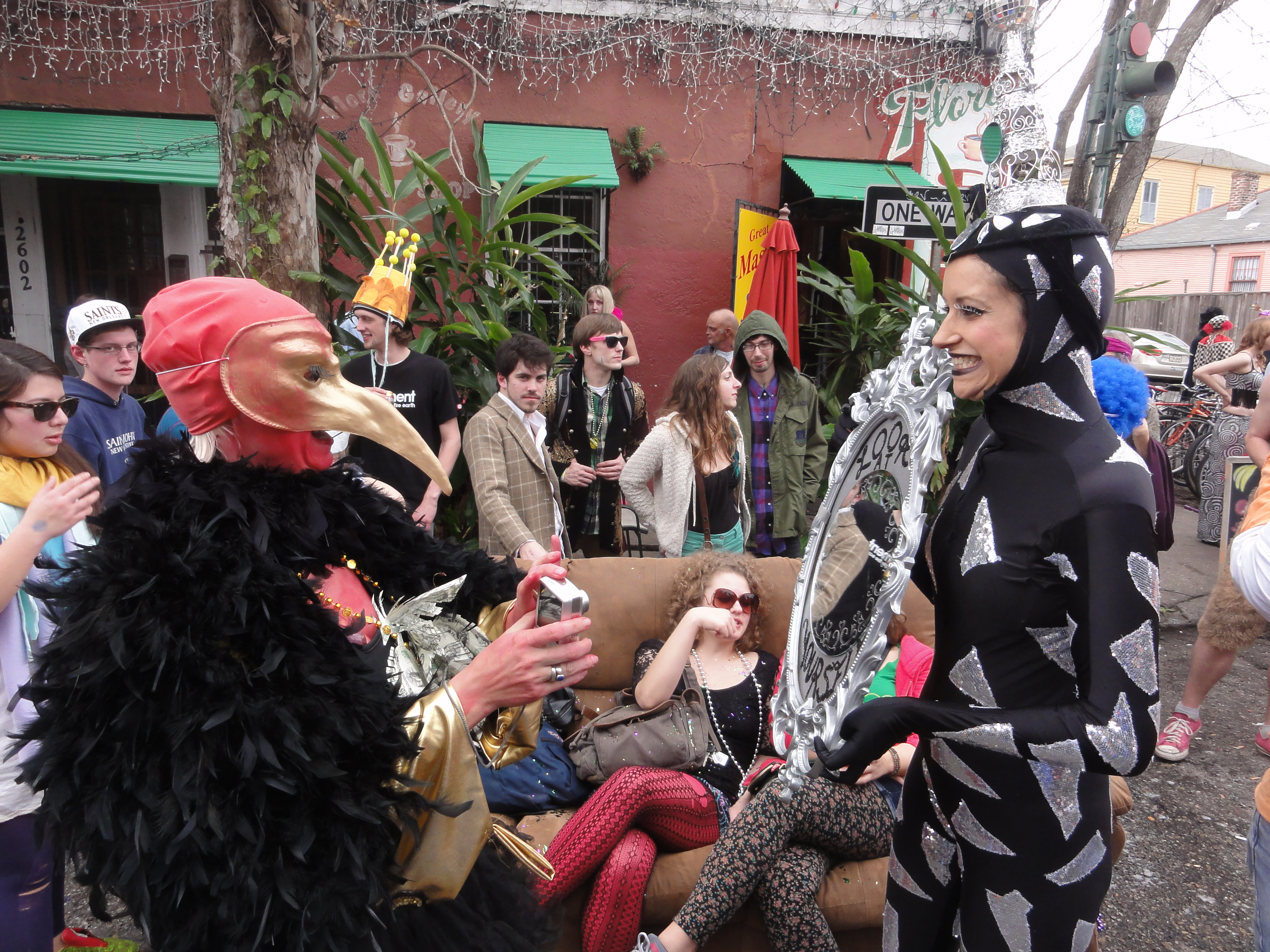
Hedge Fund Manager meets Mirror Lady in front of Flora Coffee Shop on Royal Street in the Faubourg Marigny.

"La Société de Saint Anne" is a New Orleans Mardi Gras marching krewe that parades each Mardi Gras Day. La Société de Saint Anne was founded in 1969 by residents of the French Quarter and nearby Faubourgs who recognized the need for a return to earlier traditions of "walking krewes" which at one time were more prevalent but which had been overshadowed by the development of larger float parades in the early 20th Century. As the float parades grew in scale and number, they were forced to move out of the narrow streets of the French Quarter and onto broader avenues uptown and in mid-City. The walking krewes were groups of neighbors from various wards of the city who took to the streets on foot, in celebration of their common love for the City of New Orleans and the food, music, drink, spirituality, and lifestyles that developed there during the 18th, 19th & 20th centuries. La Société de Saint Anne was formed to bring the celebration back down to street level and to revive this old tradition of celebration in the residents' own area. In the ensuing years, as the more bohemian elements of the French Quarter were forced to move further downriver to the Marigny and Bywater neighborhoods by rising property values and rents in the French Quarter, the krewe grew in size and inspired many other such walking krewes to form as subkrewes or as separate krewes altogether. The original krewe now can be identified by the cluster of crabnets (beribboned hoops carried aloft on long poles) and the presence of the Storyville Stompers.

Known for the very elaborate and beautiful costumes of its members, the core group gathers in the Bywater neighborhood of New Orleans each Mardi Gras morning, with the Storyville Stompers brass band providing the music. As they pass through the Faubourg Marigny and French Quarter, additional costumed marchers join the parade at various coffee-shops and bars along the route. The marchers continue to Canal Street to watch the Zulu Social Aid & Pleasure Club Parade and Rex Parade, then return into the French Quarter where they perform private rituals to honor those members who have passed during the previous year, then disperse to continue the celebration of those still living at private house parties, along the levee, and in the streets.
