= Angus Lind =

American columnist

Angus Lind is retired American journalist. He retired in July 2009 after 39 years with the Times-Picayune and the now-defunct afternoon States-Item newspaper. He began as a general assignment reporter for the States-Item in 1970 and covered the biggest local news stories of that decade, including the plane crash of U.S. Rep. Hale Boggs (D-LA) in Alaska, the Downtown Howard Johnson sniper incident, the Rault Center fire in which five women leaped to their deaths, the Upstairs Lounge fire, and the construction of the Louisiana Superdome.

In 1977, Lind began his column. When the States-Item merged with the Times-Picayune in 1980, the column became a mainstay for the "Living" section for 32 years. His columns kept readers in touch with the city's abnormal, unpredictable, and often inexplicable pulse. He tapped out occasionally irreverent, sometimes amusing stories chronicling the eccentricities and human comedy that constitute New Orleans. He profiled many of the city's zaniest characters, including "Black Cat" Lacombe, "Leapin' Lou" Messina, Buddy Diliberto, Abdul D. Tentmakur, and Morgus the Magnificent.

Lind frequently wrote about the "erster" and "erl" dialect of the loveable citizens known as "Yats." A "Yat" is a person who greets another person with "Where y'at?" instead of "How's it going?"

He typically shunned commentary on political controversy but did write poignant stories including his columns on Father's Day (United States) which were popular.

Lind has been cited for his comments on topics such as American newspaper mottoes, Louisiana coffee, and New Orleans musicians.

On 2009 May 31 Lind announced his retirement in his final column. "Angus has an amazing talent for putting into words what many New Orleanians were thinking"—according to reader Bob Manard, already nostalgic over Lind's last column. Ann Purnell Collom compared Lind to Elvis Presley.

After retiring, Lind authored Prime Angus, a collection of readers' favorite columns through the years.

Prior to joining the staff of the States-Item, Lind was sports editor of the Meridian Star (Meridian, Mississippi), where he covered the Southeastern Conference and the careers of Archie Manning of Ole Miss and "Pistol Pete" Maravich of LSU. Lind is a graduate of Isidore Newman High School in New Orleans and Tulane University of Louisiana. He served in the U.S. Army Reserve. He is a fan of thoroughbred horse racing and owns racehorses with friends in a partnership. Lind lives in New Orleans with his wife Anne Grinnan Lind, a Dallas native. They have two children—Patrick Angus Lind and Catherine Lind Frame—both of New Orleans.

== See also ==
- Stacy Head
- Chris Rose
- Sheila Stroup
