= Rex (krewe) =

New Orleans Mardi Gras krewe

The Rex Organization
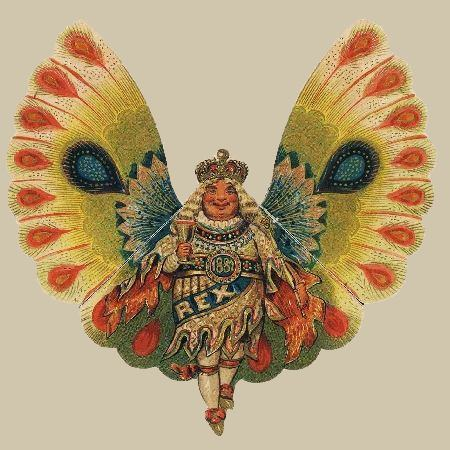
- Abbreviation: REX
- Formation: 1872; 154 years ago
- Founded at: New Orleans, LA.
- Type: Carnival Krewe
- Location: New Orleans, LA.

The Rex Organization (founded 1872), commonly referred to simply as Rex, is a New Orleans Carnival krewe which stages one of the city's most celebrated parades on Mardi Gras Day. Rex is Latin for 'king', and Rex reigns as "The King of Carnival".

== History and formation ==
Rex was organized by New Orleans businessmen in part to put on a spectacle in honour of the New Orleans visit of Grand Duke Alexei Alexandrovich of Russia (remembered locally as "Grand Duke Alexis") during the 1872 Carnival season. Also in the minds of the founders of Rex was the desire to lure tourism and business to New Orleans in the years after the American Civil War.

Rex has held more parades in New Orleans than any other parading organization. Its official song is "If Ever I Cease to Love", a quirky tune from the 1870s musical Bluebeard. This was adopted because the Grand Duke Alexis of Russia had a fondness for Lydia Thompson, the actress who sang the song in the musical, which was playing in New Orleans at the time of the first Rex parade in 1872. It has stuck around since then and is played often during Carnival.

== Membership ==
Traditionally, the secretive membership was restricted to New Orleans residents of European ancestry for most of its history, typically being elected from the membership rolls of The Boston Club including the first Rex, Louis Solomon, a Jewish businessman. However, in 1991 the New Orleans city council passed an ordinance that required social organizations, including Mardi Gras krewes, to certify publicly that they did not discriminate on the basis of race, religion, gender, or sexual orientation, in order to obtain parade permits and other public licensure. In effect, the ordinance required these, and other, private social groups to abandon their traditional code of secrecy and identify their members for the city's Human Relations Commission. The Mistick Krewe of Comus (along with Momus and Proteus, other 19th century Krewes) withdrew from parading rather than identify its membership. Rex decided to comply with the new ordinance, rather than disappear from the main event of Mardi Gras Day. Two federal courts later declared that the ordinance was an unconstitutional infringement on First Amendment rights of free association and an unwarranted intrusion on the privacy of the groups subject to the ordinance. The Supreme Court refused to hear the city's appeal from this decision. While the Krewe of Proteus returned to parading in 2000, the Mistick Krewe of Comus and the Knights of Momus have not since been seen.

The Rex organization and the Mistick Krewe of Comus still hold their annual balls together on Mardi Gras night.

== Parade ==
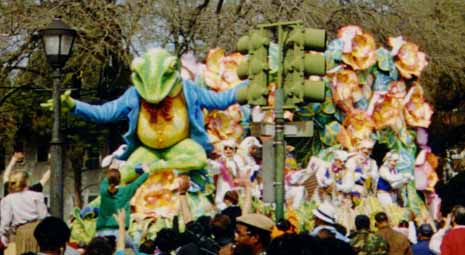
Rex parade float on Napoleon Avenue, mid 1990s

Rex assembles floats using techniques that have spanned generations, entirely by hand. Contrary to popular belief, Rex floats are not built over Civil War-era cotton wagons; they are instead built on wagons formerly employed by the City of New Orleans to collect refuse in the late 19th century.

The Rex parade is put on by The School of Design.

Since 1971, the parade has started at the corner of Napoleon Avenue and South Claiborne Avenue, proceeding south (river bound) on Napoleon to St. Charles Avenue, then east (downtown bound) on St. Charles to Canal Street. Unlike some other old-line krewes, Rex's route never went through the French Quarter prior to the city's ban on parades in the Vieux Carre which took effect in 1973.

=== Parade themes ===
The theme for each year's parade is decided more than a year in advance, and as soon as the parade is over on Mardi Gras Day, float artists begin work on the next year's parade. It takes thousands of man hours to create an entirely new parade, and it is for this reason, as well as the organization's commitment to its history and traditions, that the Rex parade is considered by some to be a highlight of the New Orleans carnival.

Parade themes tend to cover themes related to mythology, ancient kingdoms, and Louisiana.

List of Rex Parade Themes by Year
- 2026 Rebirth and Renewal
- 2025 La Belle Époque
- 2024 The Two Worlds of Lafacdio Hearn: New Orleans & Japan
- 2023 Il Palio di Siena
- 2022 School of Design Sesquicentennial
- 2021 Parade canceled due to the COVID-19 pandemic
- 2020 Omens and Auguries
- 2019 Visions of the Sun
- 2018 L'Ancienne Nouvelle-Orléans
- 2017 Carnival Fêtes and Feasts
- 2016 Horti Regis
- 2015 Wars that Shaped Early America
- 2014 Gods of All Ages
- 2013 All Creatures Great and Small
- 2012 Lore of the Ancient Americas
- 2011 This Sceptred Isle
- 2010 Fables of Fire and Flame
- 2009 Spirits of Spring
- 2008 Royal Rivers
- 2007 The Lunar Realm
- 2006 Beaux Arts and Letters
- 2005 Visions of Age-Old Cathay
- 2004 The Winged World
- 2003 Bicentennial of the Louisiana Purchase
- 2002 Royal Jazz
- 2001 Illustrious Illustrators
- 2000 Ancient Empires
- 1999 Golden Age of Mardi Gras
- 1998 Royal Gems
- 1997 If I Ever Cease to Love
- 1996 King Arthur and His Knights
- 1995 Enchanted Beasts
- 1994 Notable New Orleanians
- 1993 Royal British Scribes
- 1992 Voyages of Discovery
- 1991 The Mystery and Magic of Masks
- 1990 Audubon's Winged Splendour
- 1989 Lafcadio Hearn's Fantastics
- 1988 Fabled Gods and Heroes
- 1987 The Lure and Legend of Gold
- 1986 The Royal Academy
- 1985 Nature's Royalty
- 1984 Royal Transit Authority
- 1983 The Sovereign's Symphony
- 1982 Tricentennial Bourbon Louisiana
- 1981 Ars Poetica
- 1980 Flora of the Realm
- 1979 Parade cancelled due to New Orleans Police Department strike
- 1978 Rex and the Masters
- 1977 Look to the Stars
- 1976 Jazz: A New Orleans Heritage
- 1975 Creatures of the Imagination
- 1974 Twice Told Tales
- 1973 Kings and Queens of Fantasy and Fact
- 1972 A Tribute to Jules Verne
- 1971 Centennial Celebration
- 1970 Classics, Cartoons, and Comics
- 1969 Genesis Through Gemini
- 1968 New Orleans We Love You
- 1967 To the Ladies, Bless Them All
- 1966 The Adventures of Alice
- 1965 Once Upon a Rhyme
- 1964 We Return to the Land of Oz
- 1963 World of the Brothers Grimm
- 1962 Year of the Circus
- 1961 The Magic of Music
- 1960 The Wonderful World of Let's Pretend
- 1959 The Adventures of Marco Polo
- 1958 Tales of Hans Christian Andersen
- 1957 Favorite Stories from the Old Testament
- 1956 Festivals Over the World
- 1955 Washington's Birthday and Life
- 1954 Nature Creates, Man Invents
- 1953 Origin of Names of States, Seals, and Flags
- 1952 Panorama Through the Magic Sugar Egg
- 1951 Parade cancelled due to the Korean War
- 1950 Adventures in Slumberland
- 1949 Louisiana – Utopia of the South
- 1948 Dances Through the Ages
- 1947 What Is the Sea Shell Saying
- 1946 Myths of the Starry Hosts
- 1945 Carnival cancelled due to WWII
- 1944 Carnival cancelled due to WWII
- 1943 Carnival cancelled due to WWII
- 1942 Carnival cancelled due to WWII
- 1941 Gems from the Arabian Nights
- 1940 A Fantasy of the Alphabet
- 1939 Belgian Fairy Tales
- 1938 Realms of Earth, Sea, and Air
- 1937 Nature the First Inventor
- 1936 Roumanian Fairy Tales
- 1935 Nature's Workshop
- 1934 The Conquest of Air
- 1933 Paradise cancelled due to heavy rainfall
- 1932 Rex Scrap Book – 1932
- 1931 The History of Drama
- 1930 The Jewels of Rex
- 1929 Outline of History
- 1928 Transportation
- 1927 The Music of the Ages
- 1926 The Music of Bells
- 1925 Romances of Fan Land
- 1924 Notable Women Down the Ages
- 1923 A Fantasy of the Sea
- 1922 Romances of River and Valley
- 1921 Porcelain in Fact and Fancy
- 1920 Life's Pilgrimage
- 1919 Carnival cancelled due to Spanish Flu
- 1918 Carnival cancelled due to WWI
- 1917 The Gifts of the Gods to Louisiana
- 1916 Visions from the Poets
- 1915 Fragments from Song and Story
- 1914 The Drama of the Year
- 1913 Enchantments and Transformations
- 1912 Phases of Nature
- 1911 Arts and Sciences
- 1910 The Freaks of Fable
- 1909 The Treasures of the King
- 1908 The Classics of Childhood
- 1907 Visions of the Nations
- 1906 In Utopia
- 1905 Idealistic Queens
- 1904 In the Realm of Imagination
- 1903 Feasts and Fêtes
- 1902 Quotations from Literature
- 1901 Human Passions and Characteristics
- 1900 Terpsichore
- 1899 Reveries of Rex
- 1898 Harvest Queens
- 1897 On the Water – Real and Fanciful
- 1896 Heavenly Bodies
- 1895 Chronicles of Fairyland – Fantastic Tales for Young and Old
- 1894 Illustrations from Literature
- 1893 Fantasies
- 1892 Symbolism of Colors
- 1891 Visions
- 1890 Rulers of Ancient Times
- 1889 The Treasures of the Earth
- 1888 The Realm of Flowers
- 1887 Music and Drama – Odds and Ends – Washington
- 1886 The Triumph of Aurelian – Grand Historical Scenes
- 1885 Ivanhoe
- 1884 The Semitic Races
- 1883 Atlantis – The Antediluvian World
- 1882 The Pursuit of Pleasure
- 1881 Arabian Nights Tales
- 1880 The Four Elements
- 1879 The History of the World
- 1878 The Gods Modernized
- 1877 Military Progress of the World
- 1876 Persian & Egyptian
- 1875 Parade cancelled to protest federal occupation of the city after Crescent City White League riots
- 1874 Persian
- 1873 Egyptian
- 1872 Triumphal Entry

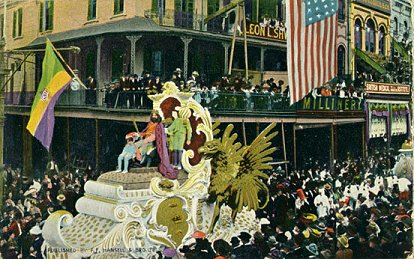
Rex, 1904, on Canal Street, New Orleans

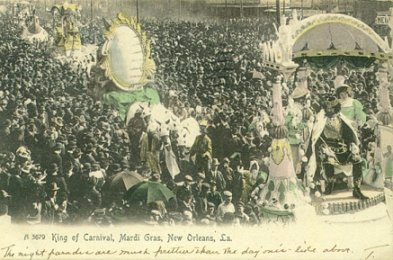
Rex, 1907 Robert Henry Downman

=== Royal court ===
One member of the Rex Organization is each year chosen to be the monarch of the organization; he is often incorrectly referred to by the (technically redundant) phrase "King Rex". The correct title is simply "Rex". The identity of Rex is made public on Lundi Gras, the day before Mardi Gras. Rex is always a prominent person in the city, one who is usually involved in several philanthropic and civic causes. The Mayor of New Orleans traditionally hands over the key to the city of New Orleans to Rex for Mardi Gras Day.

A consort is also chosen each year for Rex and she is titled the "Queen of Carnival". The queen is always a debutante of the current season. Like Rex, the queen is chosen in the spring of the previous year, and must keep her identity secret until Lundi Gras.

== Ball & Meeting of the Courts ==
In addition to its famous parade, the Rex Organization also holds a private ball for its membership and invited guests on Mardi Gras night. In the 1950s, this ball made headlines when the Duke and Duchess of Windsor bowed down to Rex and the Queen of Carnival.

Pre Hurricane Katrina, the Rex ball was held on one side of the Municipal Auditorium, while on the other half of the building at the same time, the Mistick Krewe (the oldest krewe), holds its ball and was a more veiled affair.

Since Hurricane Katrina, the organizations have held their balls in the Sheraton and Marriott Hotels downtown. The rich tradition that Comus, ruler of the Mistick Krewe, extends an invitation to Rex and his queen to join him and his consort at the ball of the Mistick Krewe has been on public display on Canal Street, where a red carpet is rolled out. The court of The Rex Parade joins by invitation that of the senior krewe and the event is called The Meeting of the Courts, then when the monarchs have all made their exits, the Captain of the Mistick Krewe closes the curtain on the Carnival season.

Since 1997, the Rex ball and Meeting of the Courts has been televised annually by New Orleans' PBS station WYES-TV; the special has historically been hosted by Mardi Gras historians Peggy Scott and Errol Laborde.

== Le Boeuf Gras ==
In early Mardi Gras celebrations parades would include a live ox or Bœuf Gras ('fattened ox'). The ox represented the last meat to be eaten before the beginning of Lent.

The first appearance of bœuf gras in a modern parading krewe was the Mistick Krewe 1867 parade entitled "Triumphs of Epicurus" including masked and costumed krewemen representing food and beverages with boeuf gras included.

A bœuf gras was included in the first Rex parade decorated with garland and ribbons directly behind Rex. Legend has it that Old Jeff, a stockyard bull from Arabi, was used in later years.

In 1900 bœuf gras was taken out of the Rex parade as it was thought outsiders to traditional Mardi Gras would not understand. By proclamation from Rex usage of a live ox "was not in harmony with the beautiful displays which are produced in this era and (it) must be relegated to the past."

In 1959 Rex issued another proclamation announcing the return of bœuf gras, spelled 'boeuf gras', as a papier-mâché float design.

Today, le boeuf gras is the fourth float in the Rex parade and is surrounded by masked krewemen costumed as butchers and bakers, many of whom are past kings of Carnival.

== Pro Bono Publico ==
Since its founding in 1872, a few years after the civil war, Rex has constantly held itself to a tradition of public service. The Rex motto, "Pro Bono Publico" (for the public good) was adopted during this time, and continues to define the organization's commitment to service.

Following Hurricane Katrina, Rex organized a series of community service initiatives in 2006 under the banner "Operation Pro Bono Publico." The efforts of Rex targeted specific community needs such as support for police and other first responders, an organized clean-up effort of the Uptown parade route after Mardi Gras, as well as continued efforts to support New Orleans' Charter Schools.

== Mardi Gras Colors ==
Rex established purple, green, and gold as the official colors of Mardi Gras in 1892. The three colors symbolize justice, faith, and power.

== Gallery ==
=== Bulletin ===
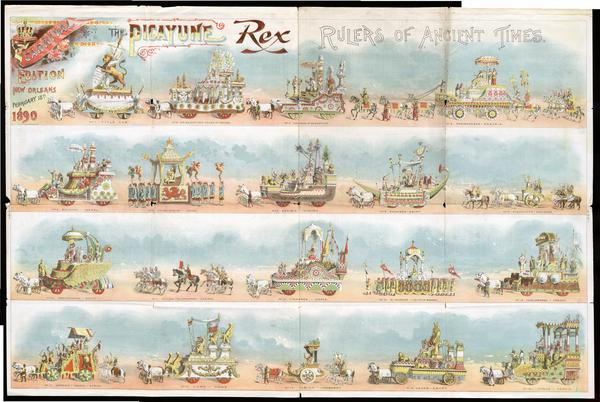
1890 Rulers of Ancient Times

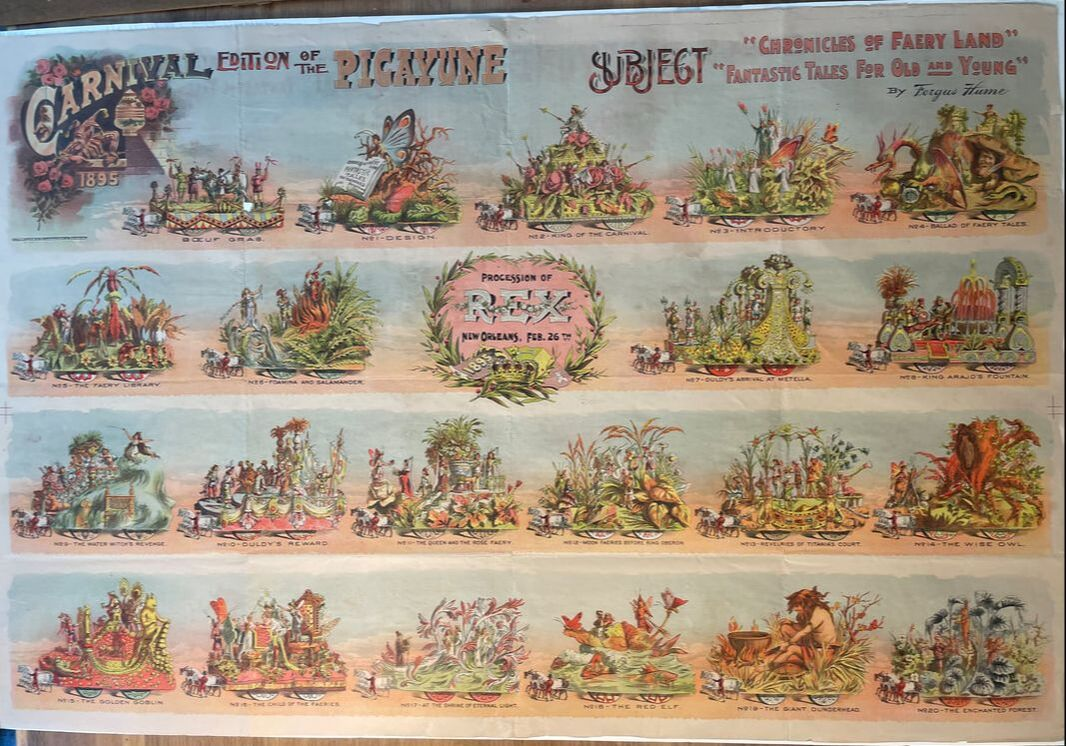
1895 Chronicles of Faery Land/Fantastic Tales for Young & Old

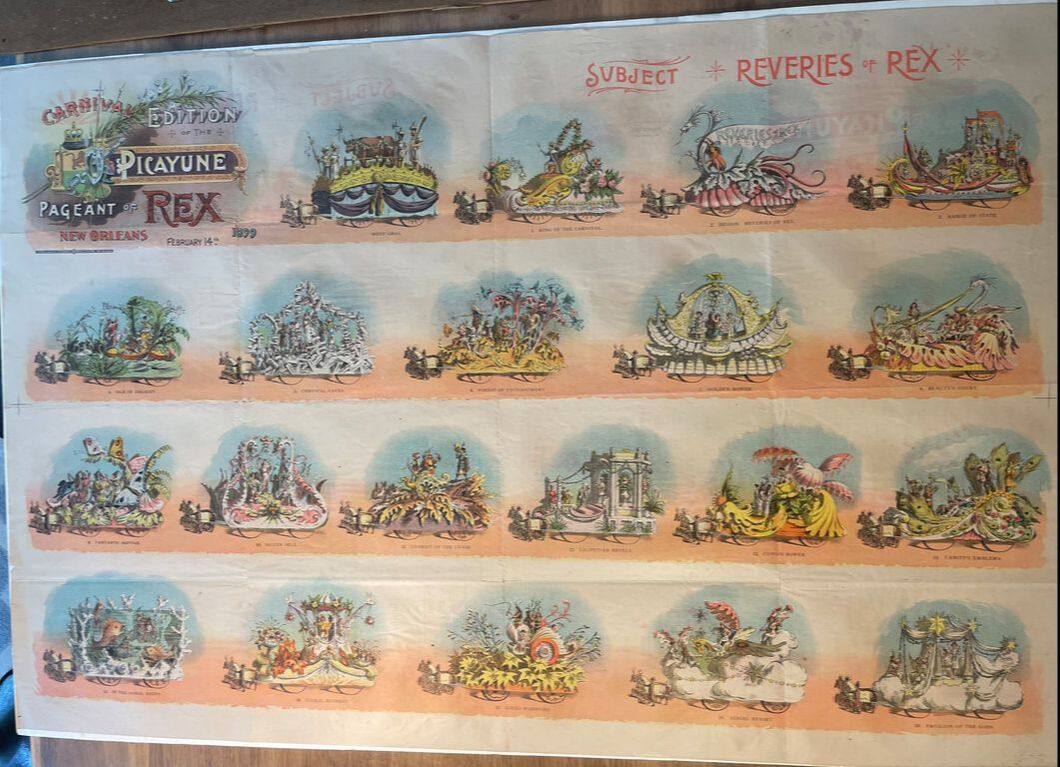
1899 Revelries of Rex

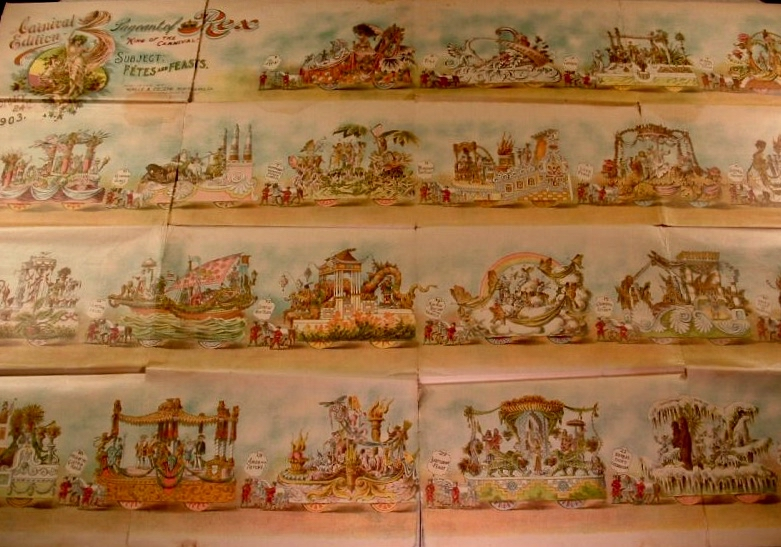
1903 Fetes and Feasts

=== Floats and Costumes ===
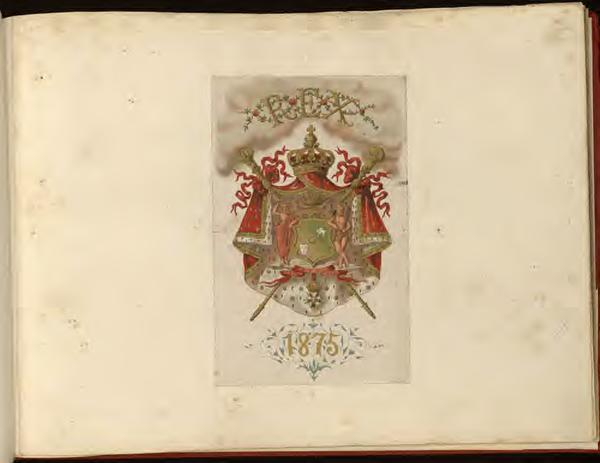
1875

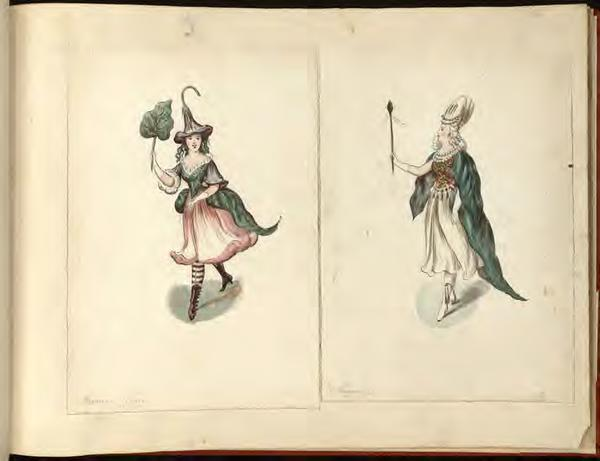
1875

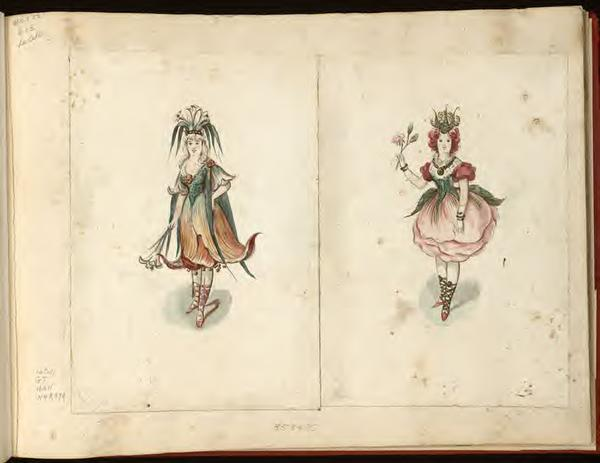
1875

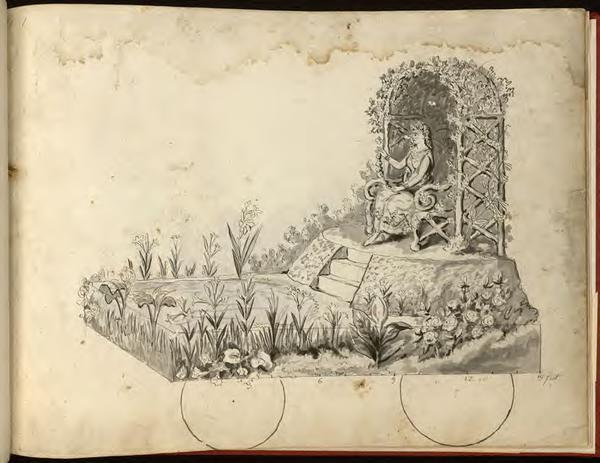
1875

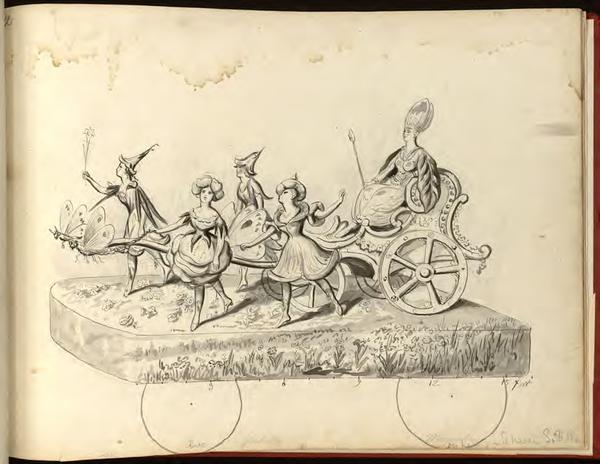
1875

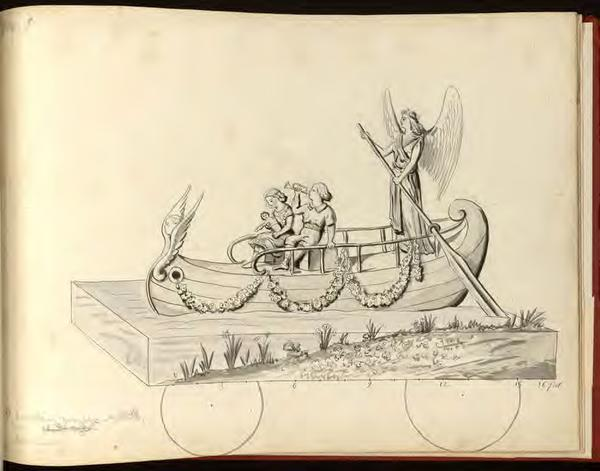
1875

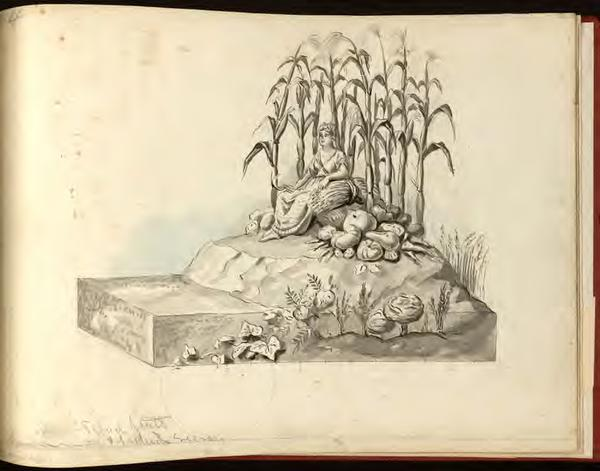
1875

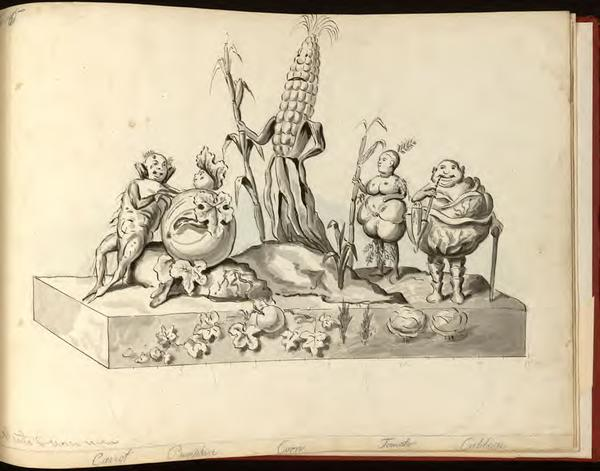
1875

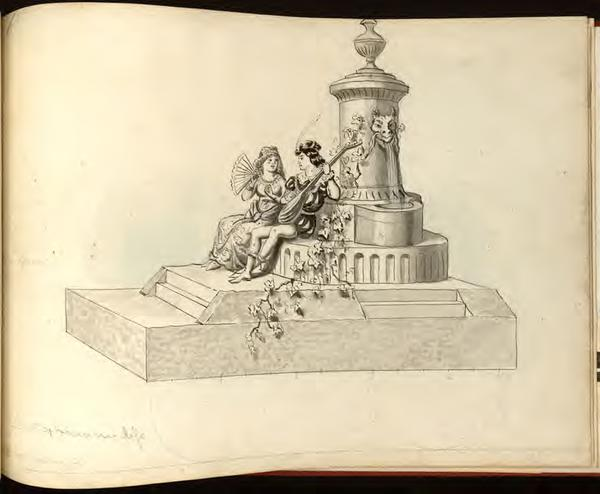
1875

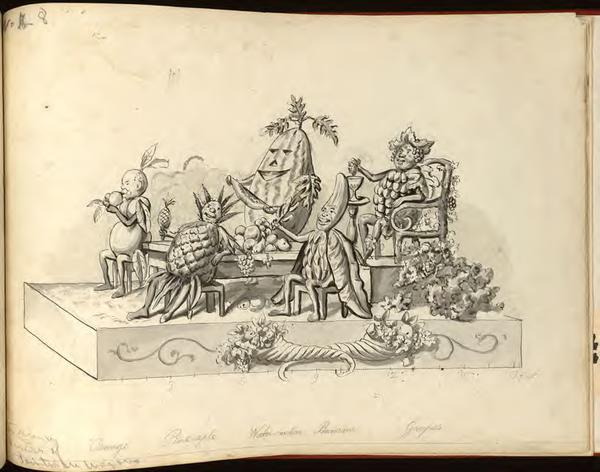
1875

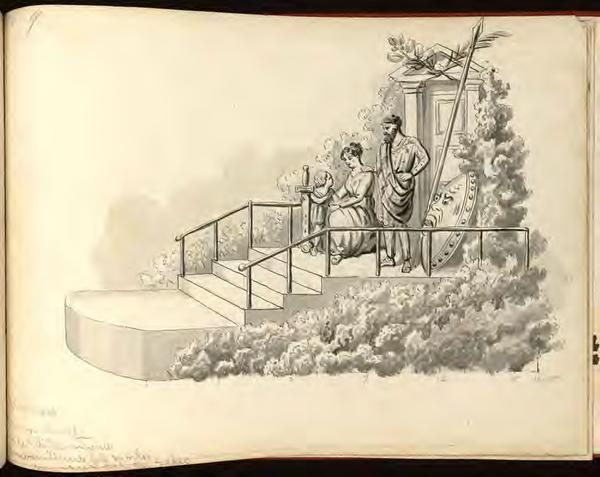
1875

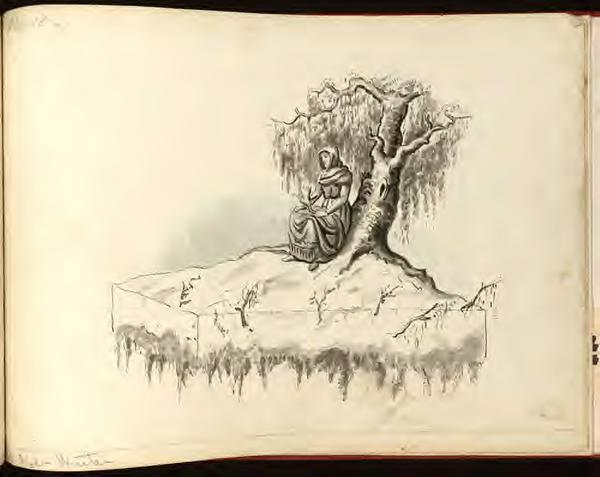
1875

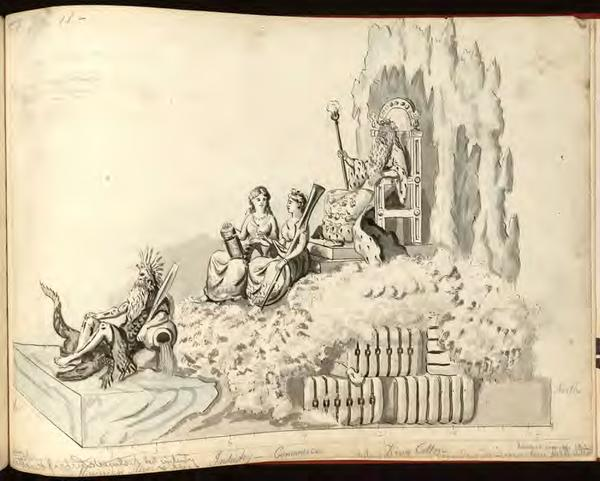
1875

=== Invitation ===
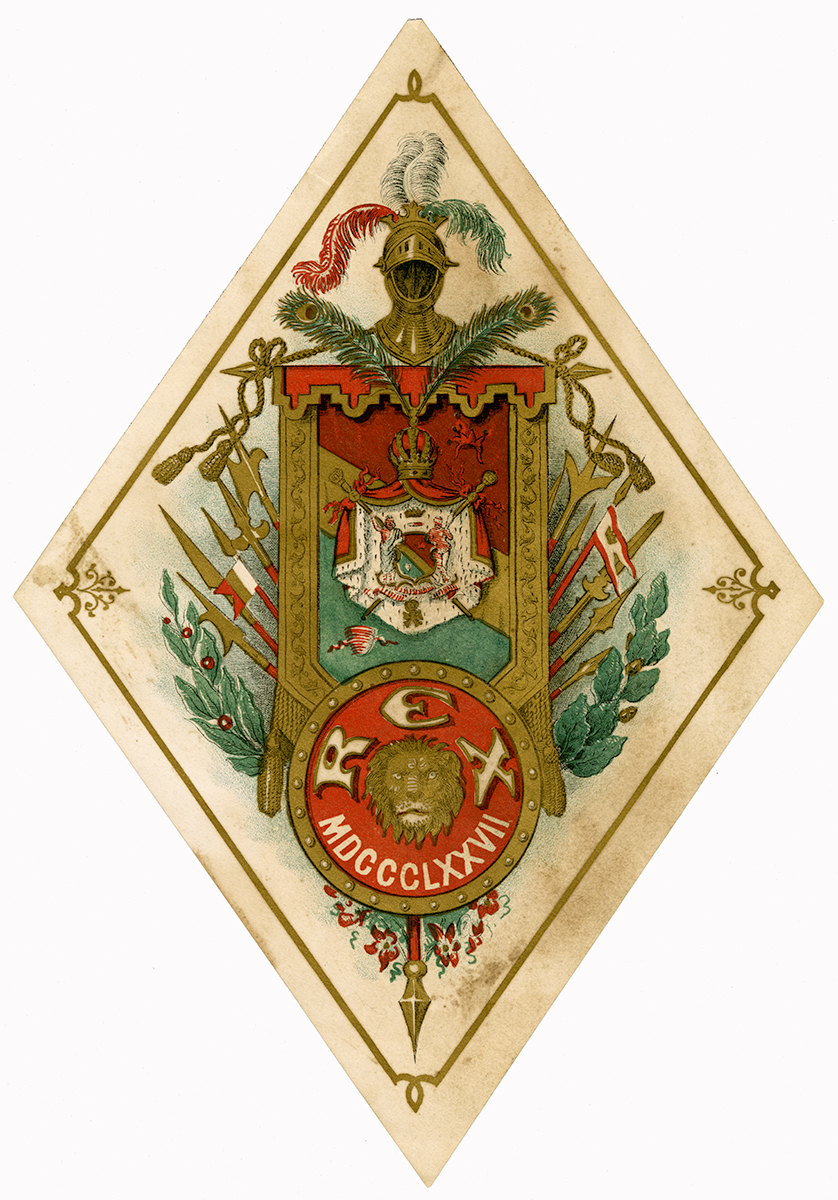
1877

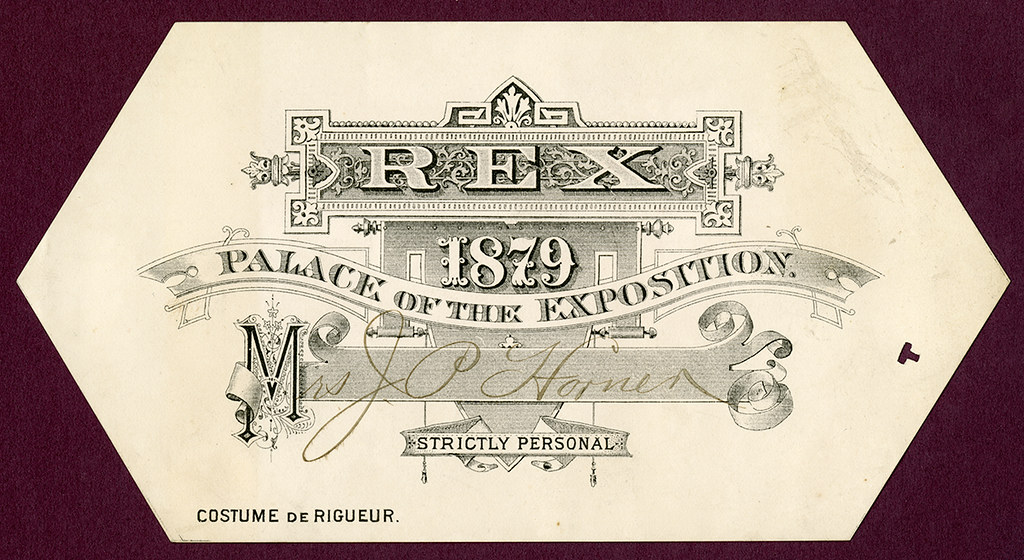
1879 Admittance Card

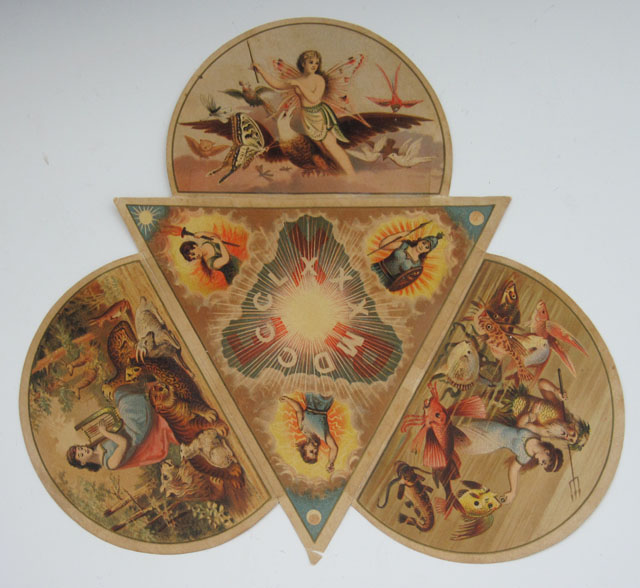
1880

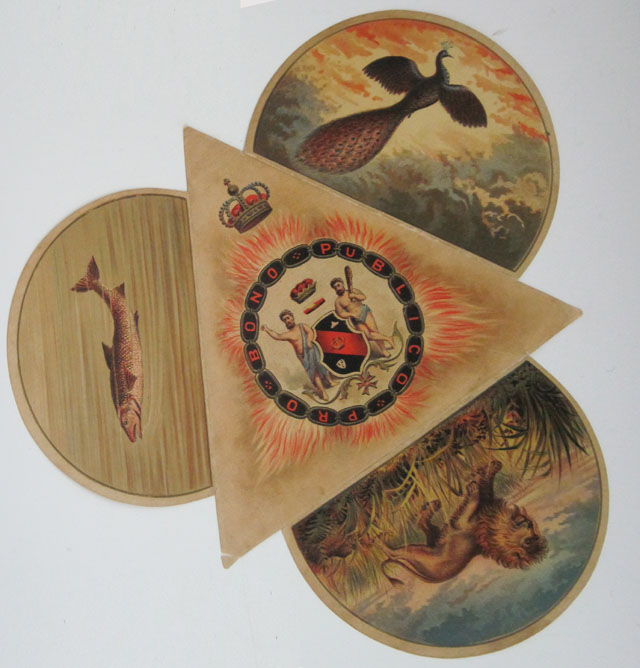
1880

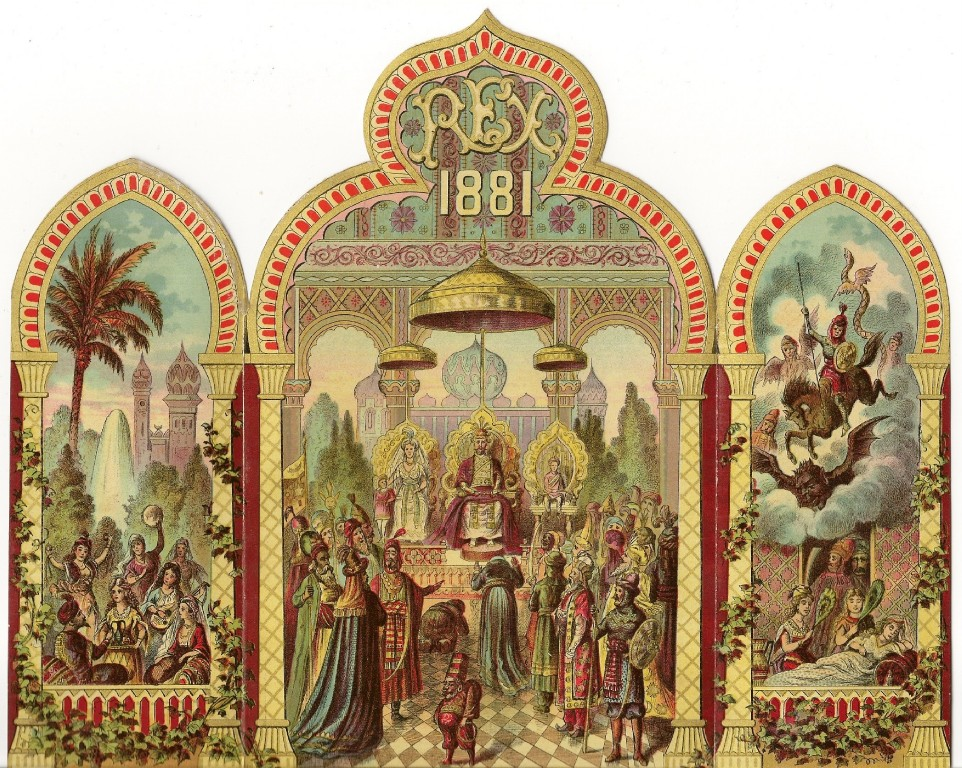
1881

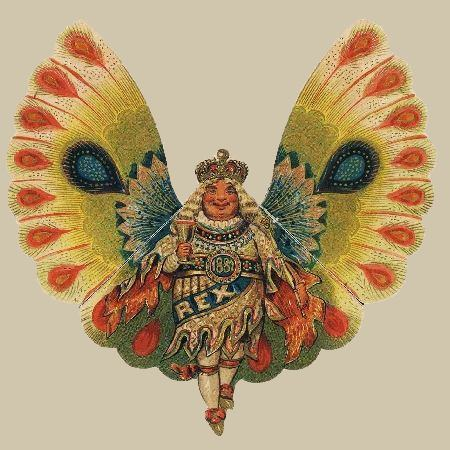
1882

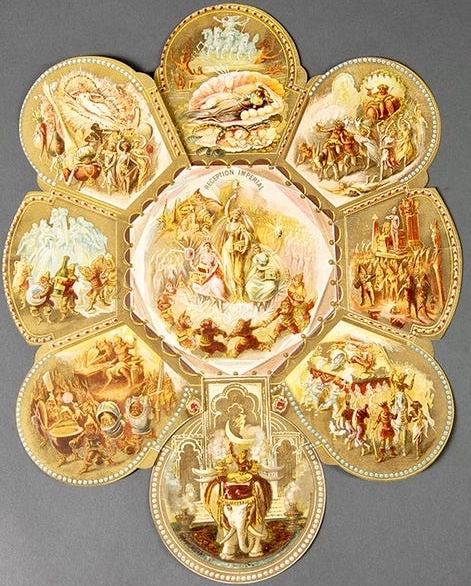
1889

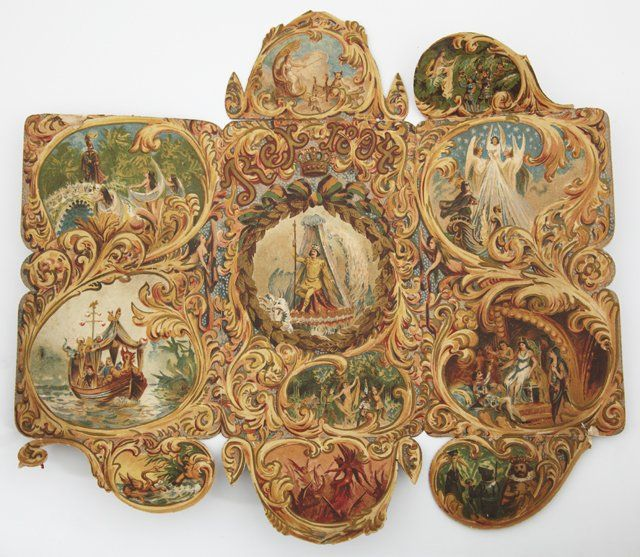
1894

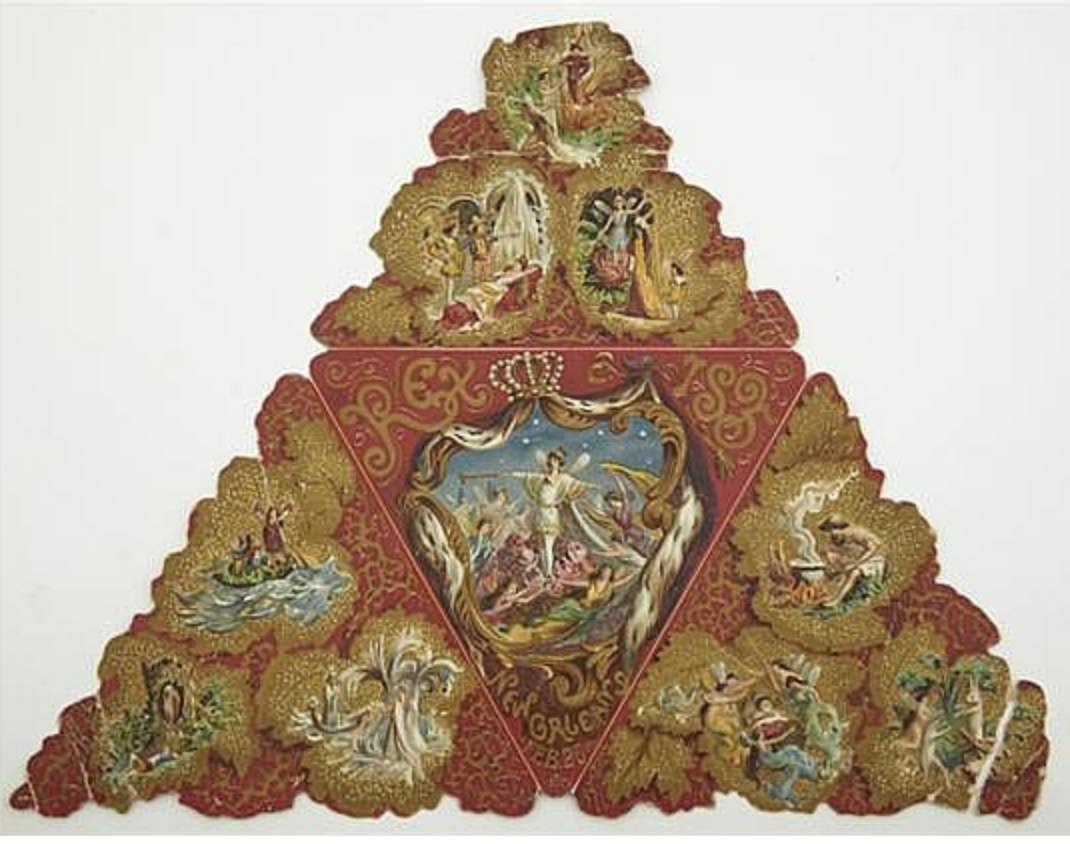
1895

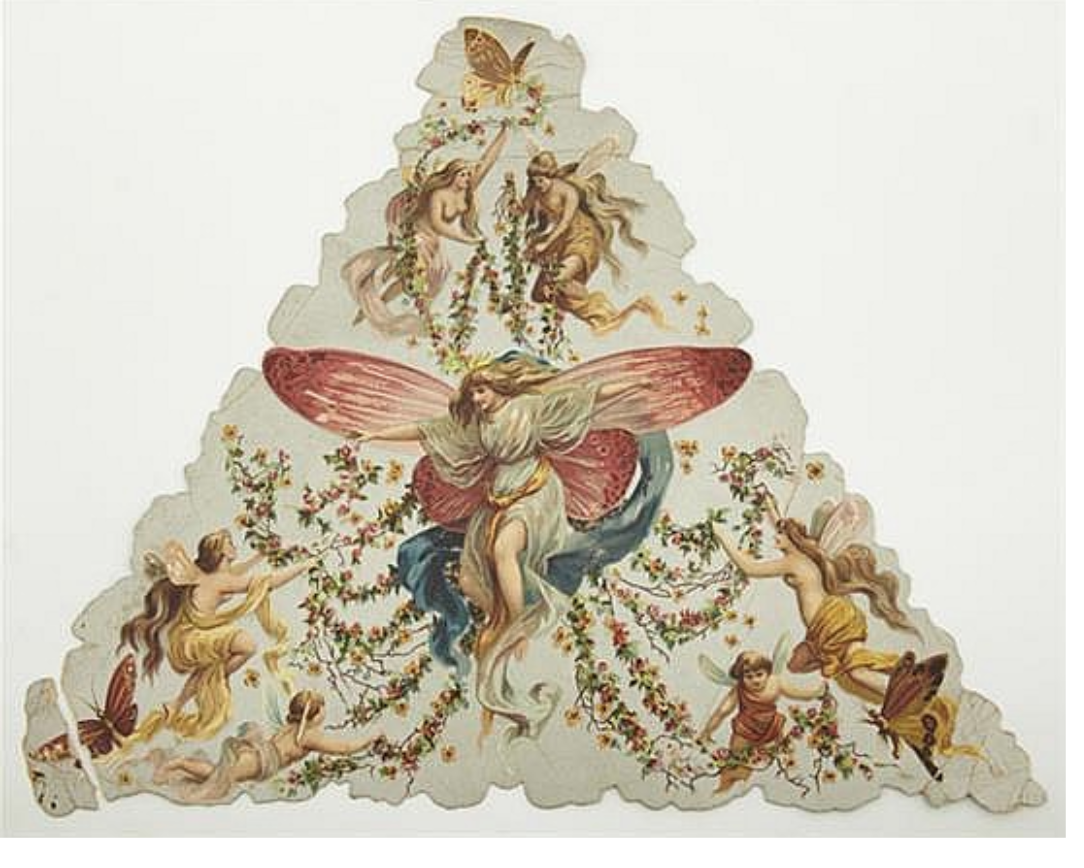
1895

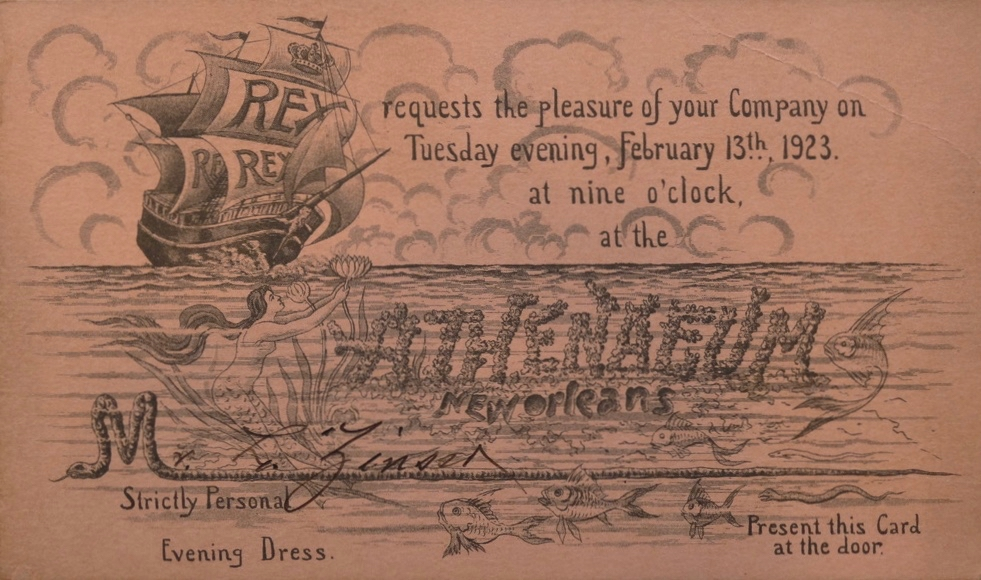
1923 Admittance Card

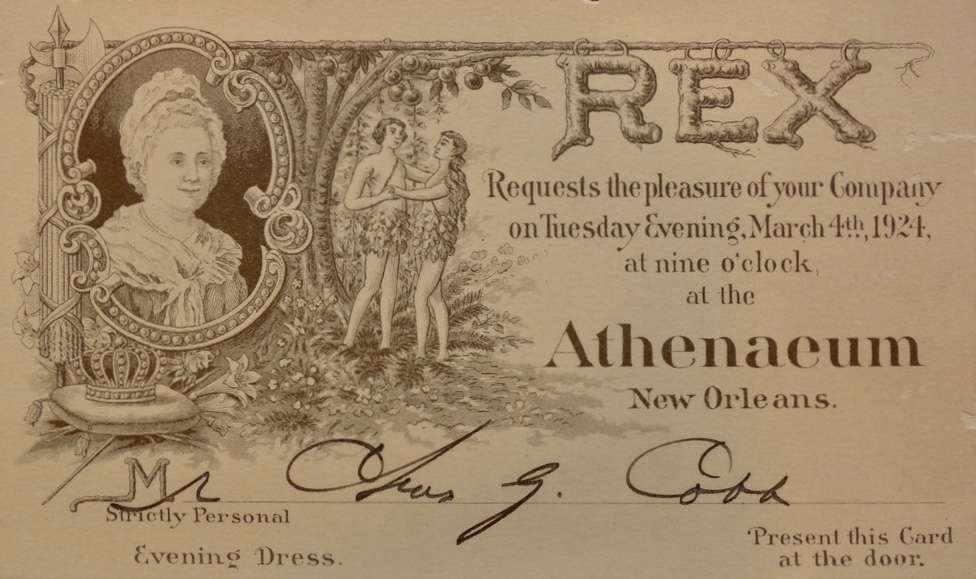
1924 Admittance Card

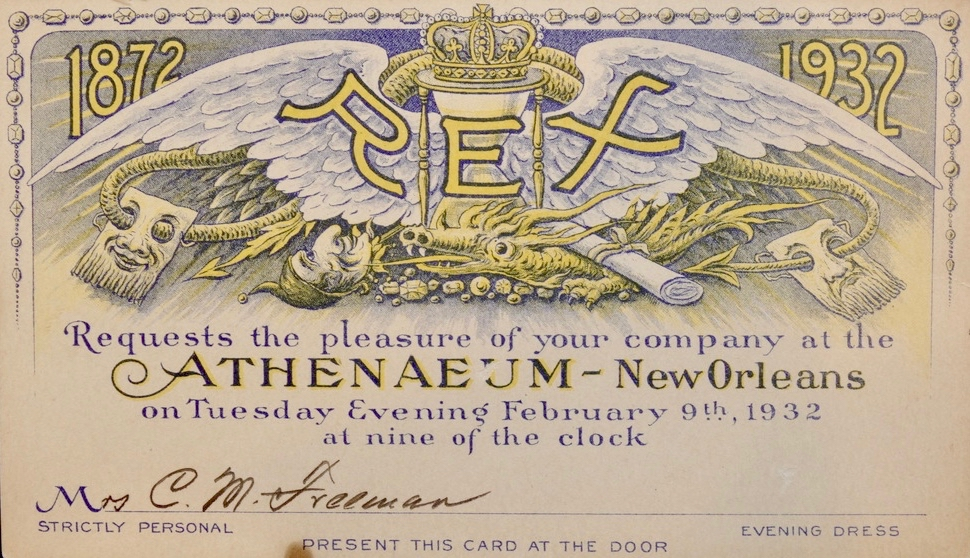
1932 Admittance Card

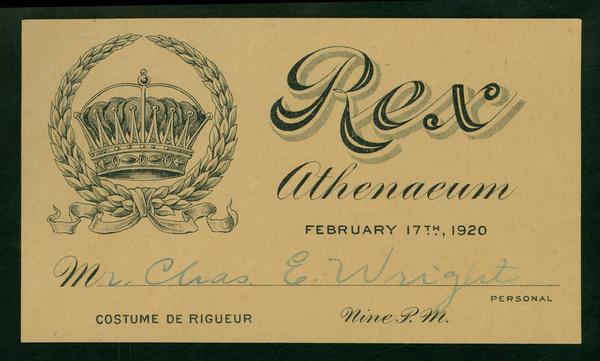
1920 Admittance Card

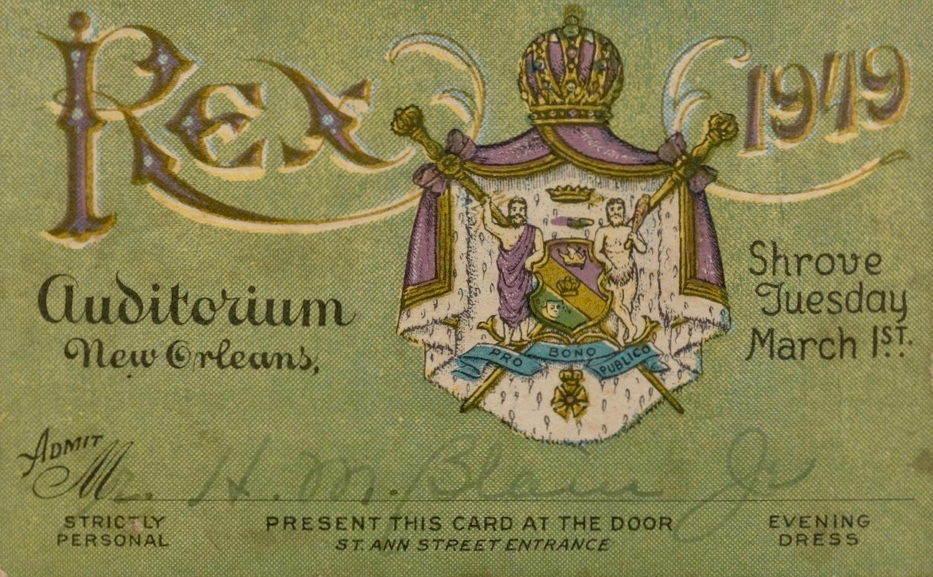
1949 Admittance Card

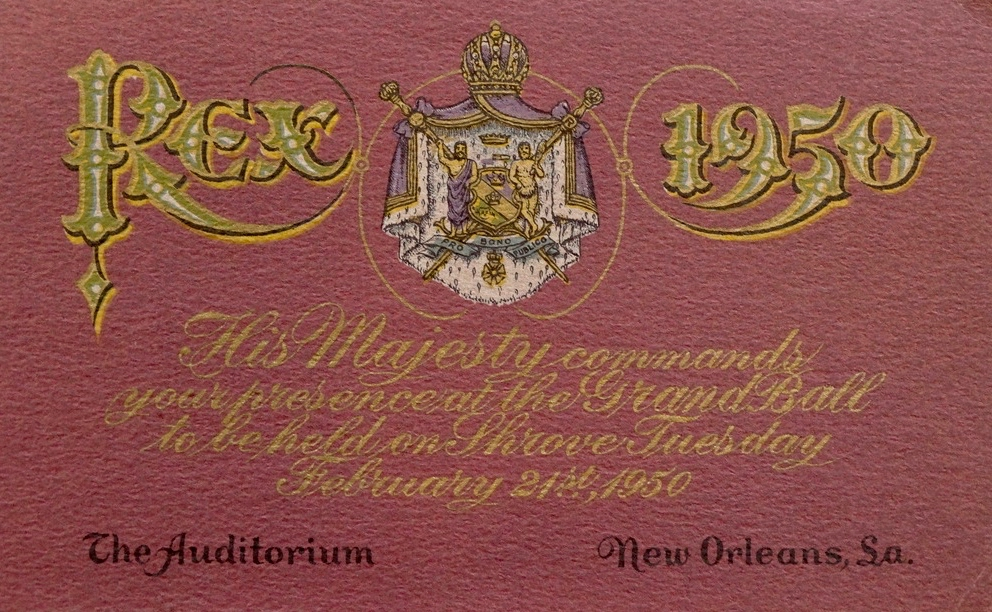
1950 Admittance Card

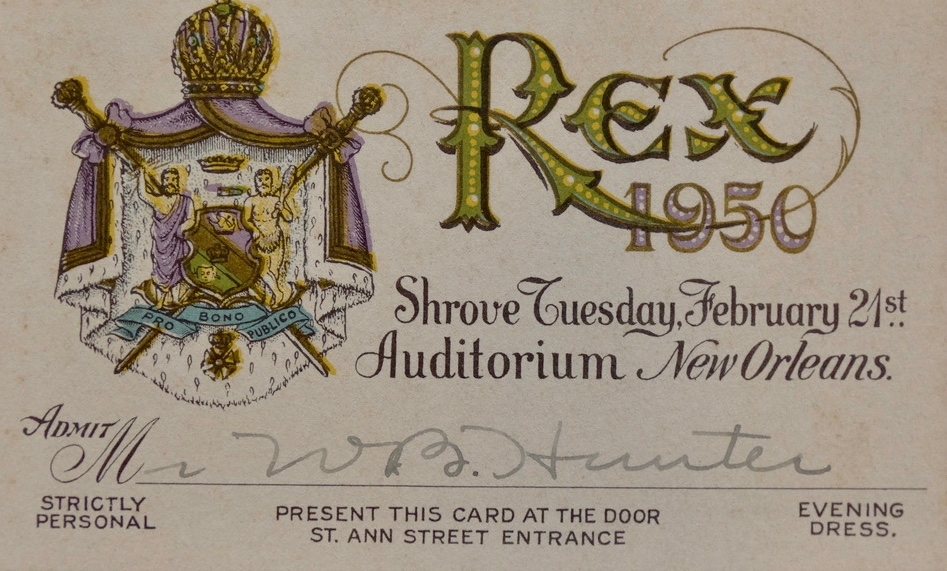
1950 Admittance Card

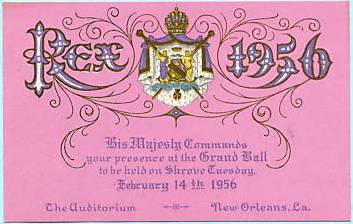
1956 Admittance Card

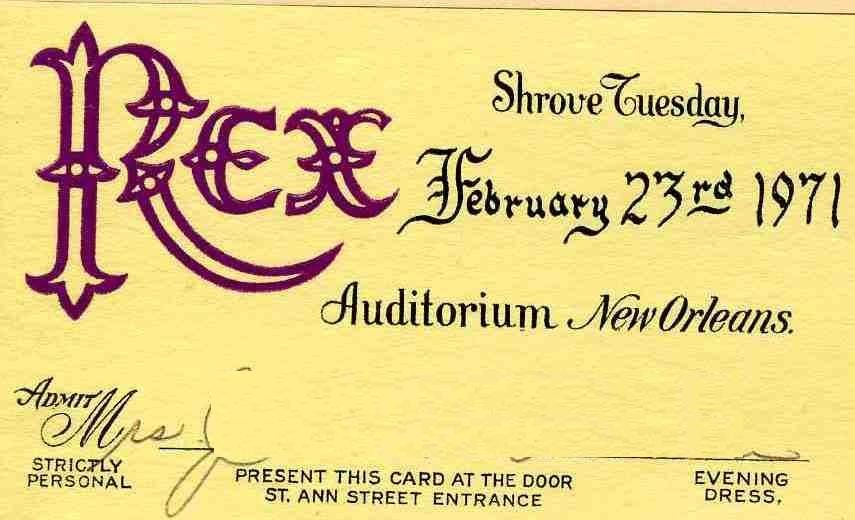
1971 Admittance (F)

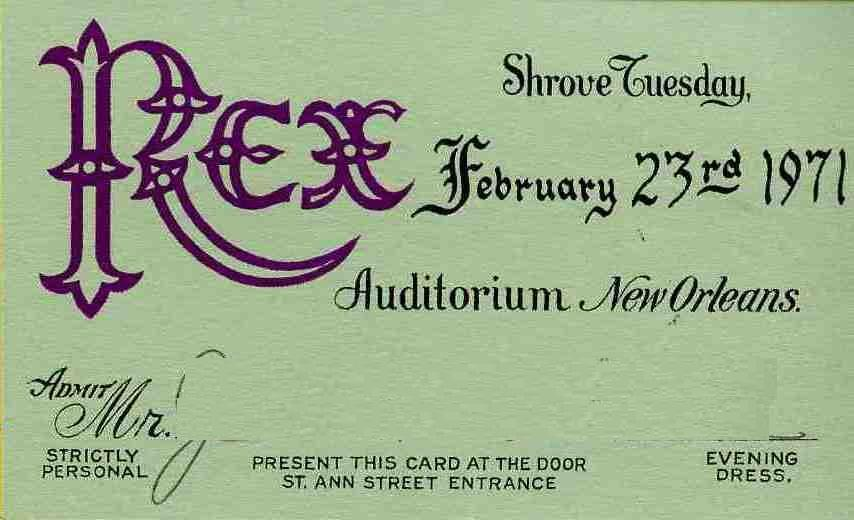
1971 Admittance (M)

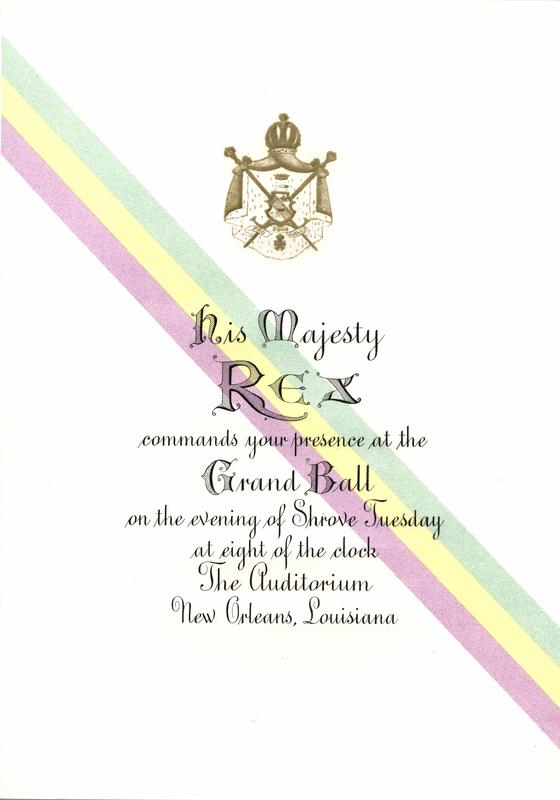
1976

=== Parade ===
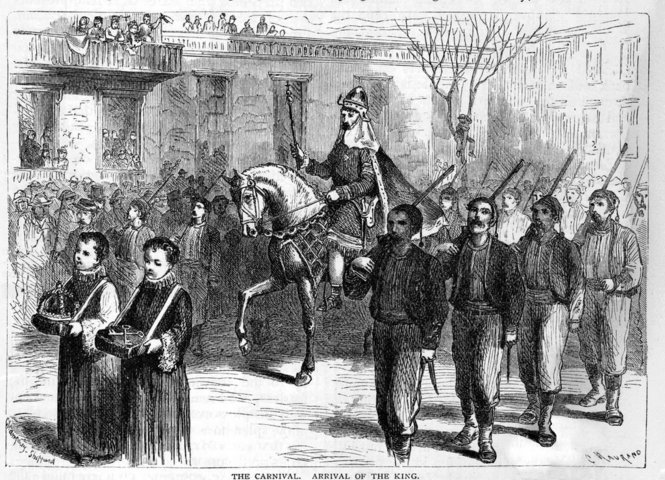
1873

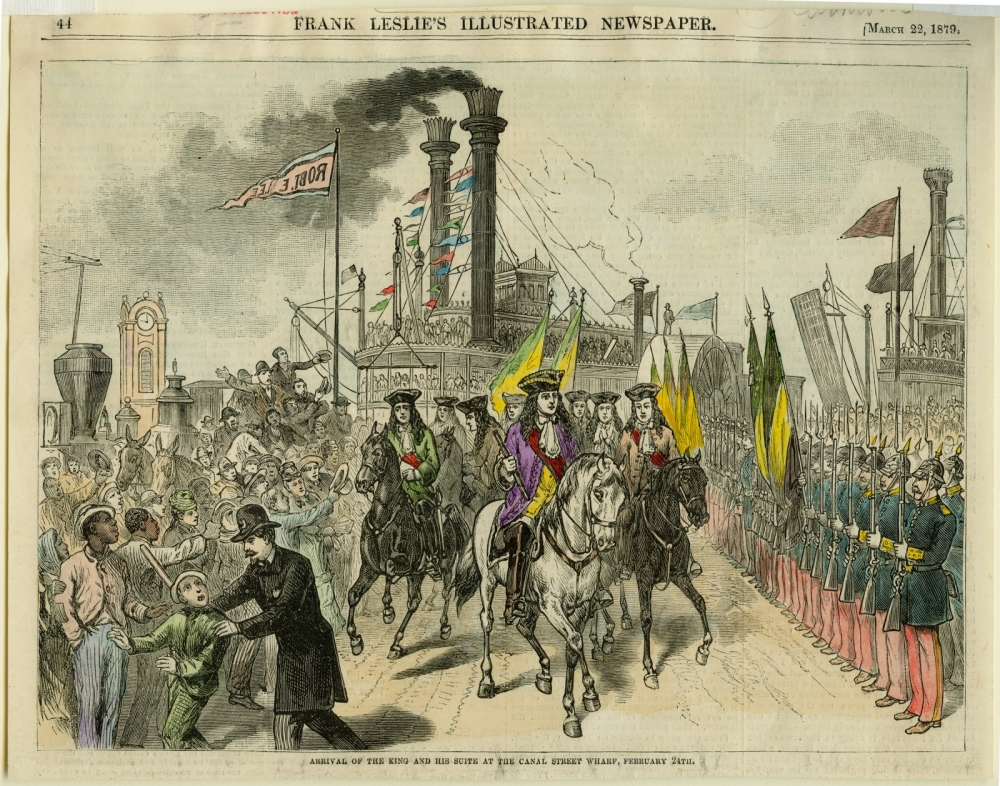
1879

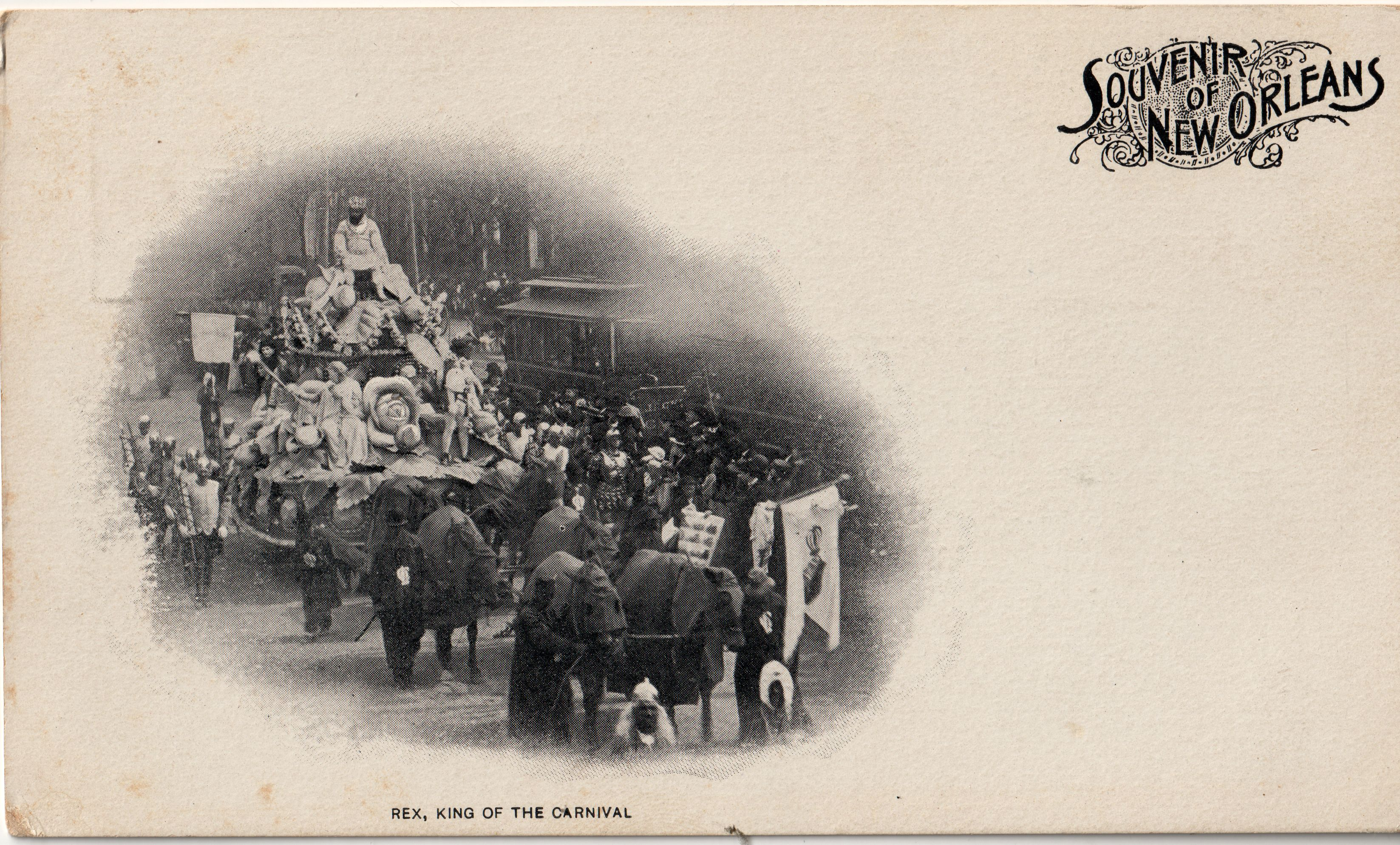
circa 1900

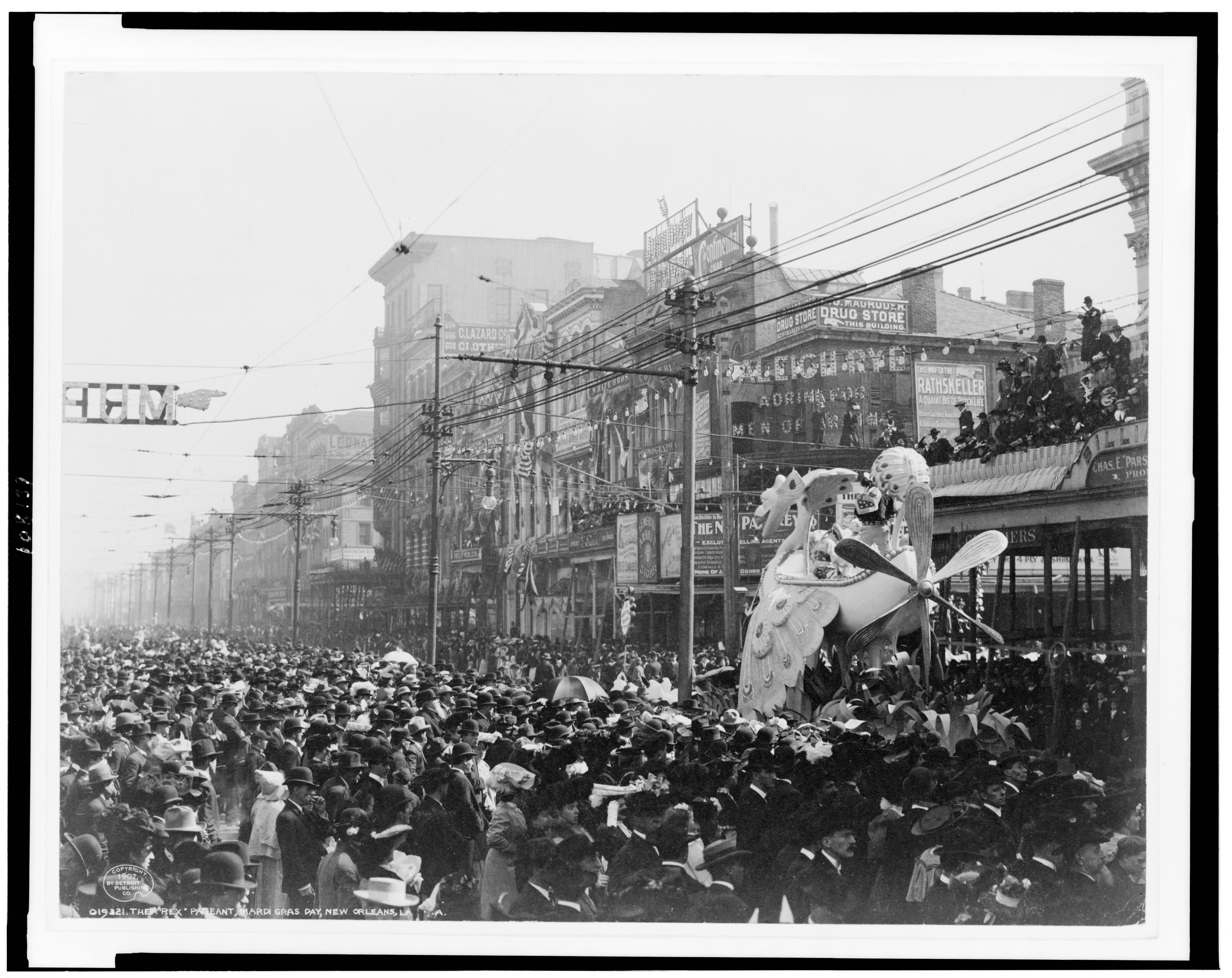
1907

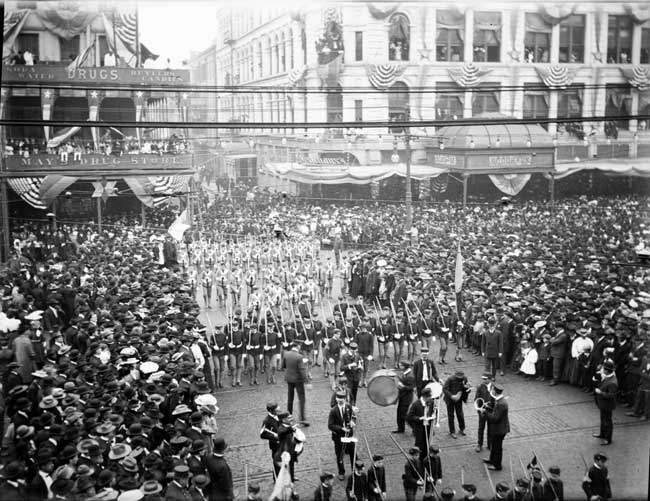
1908

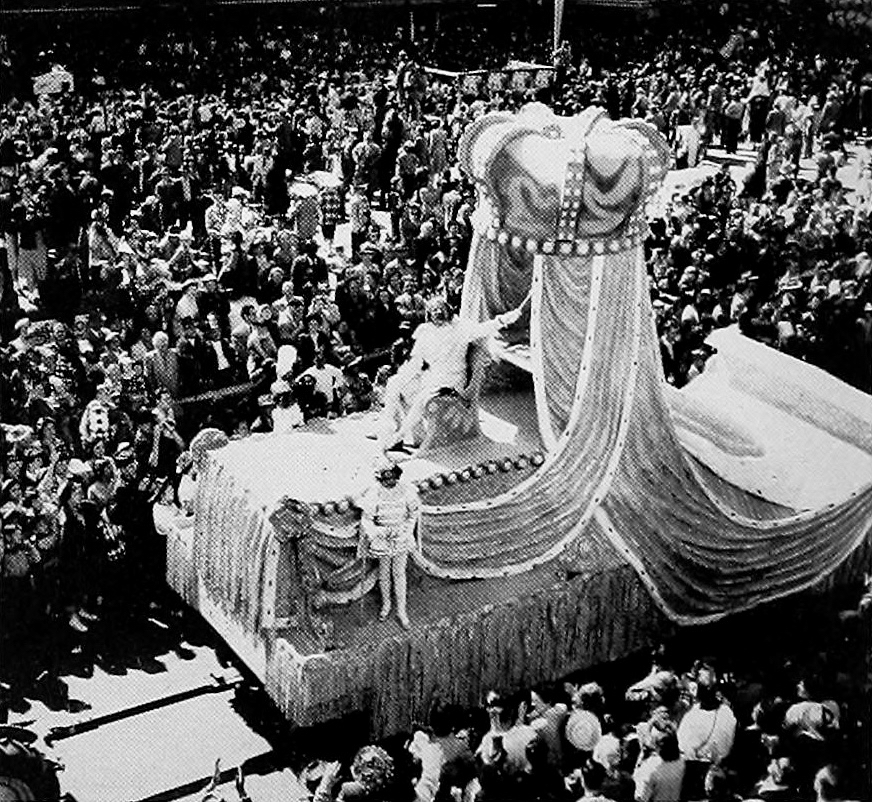
1959

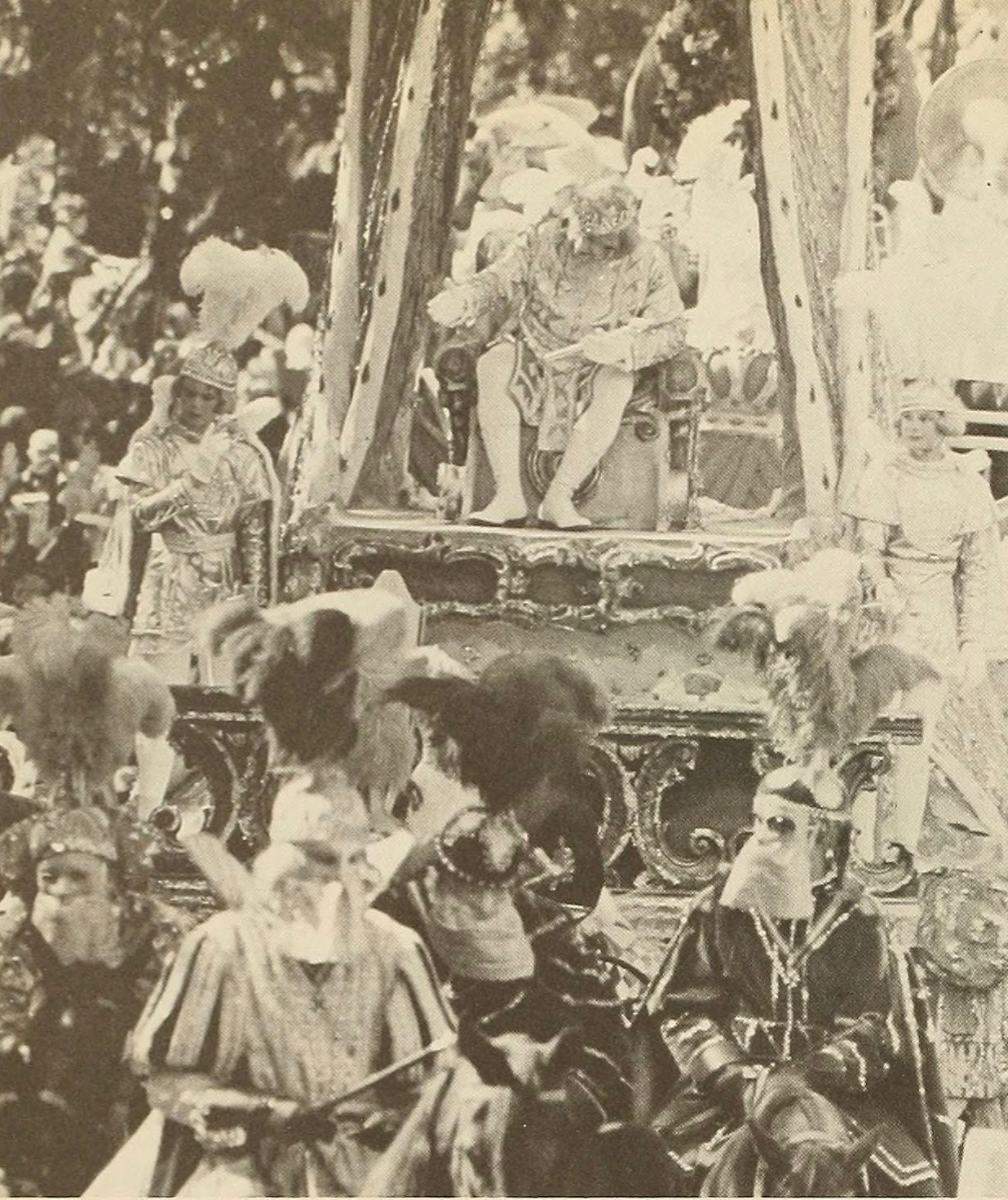
1969 King & Dukes

=== Proclamation ===
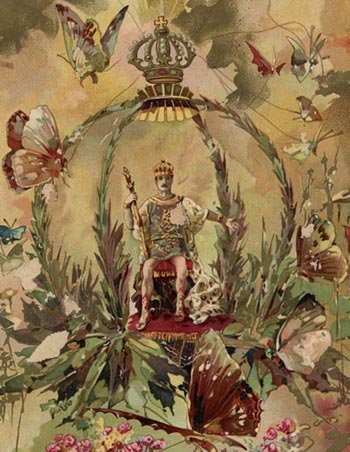
1872

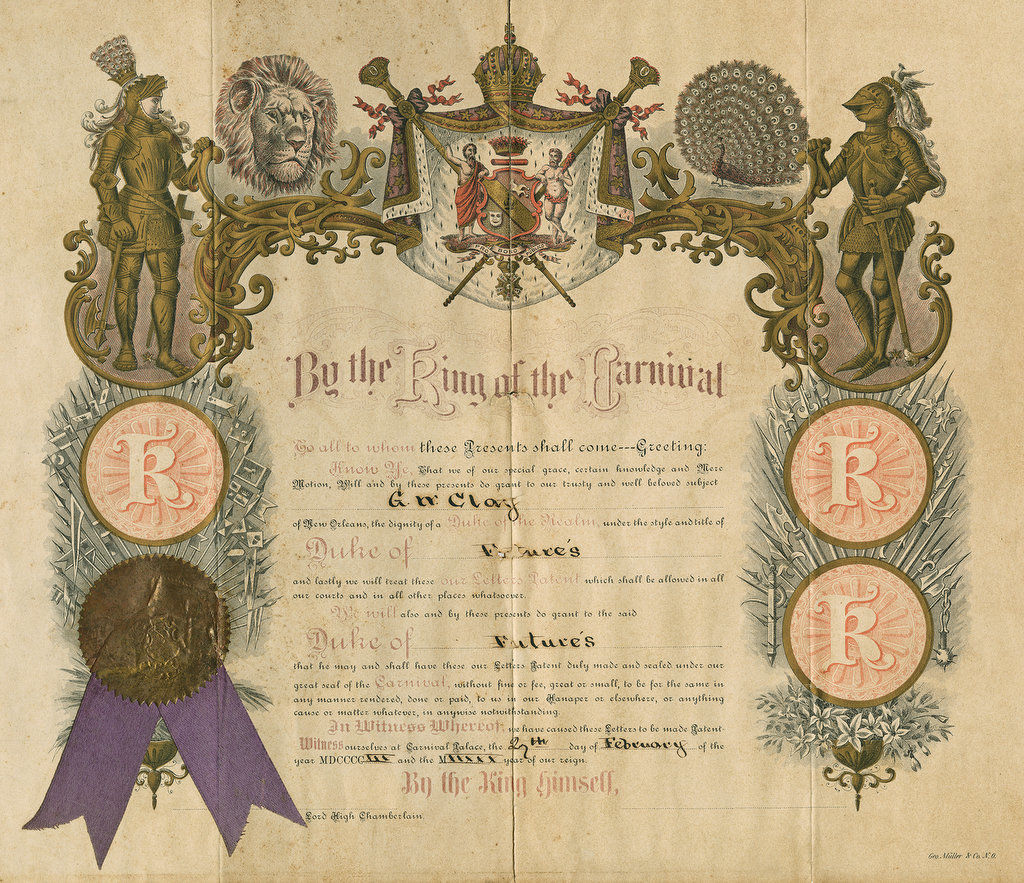
1912

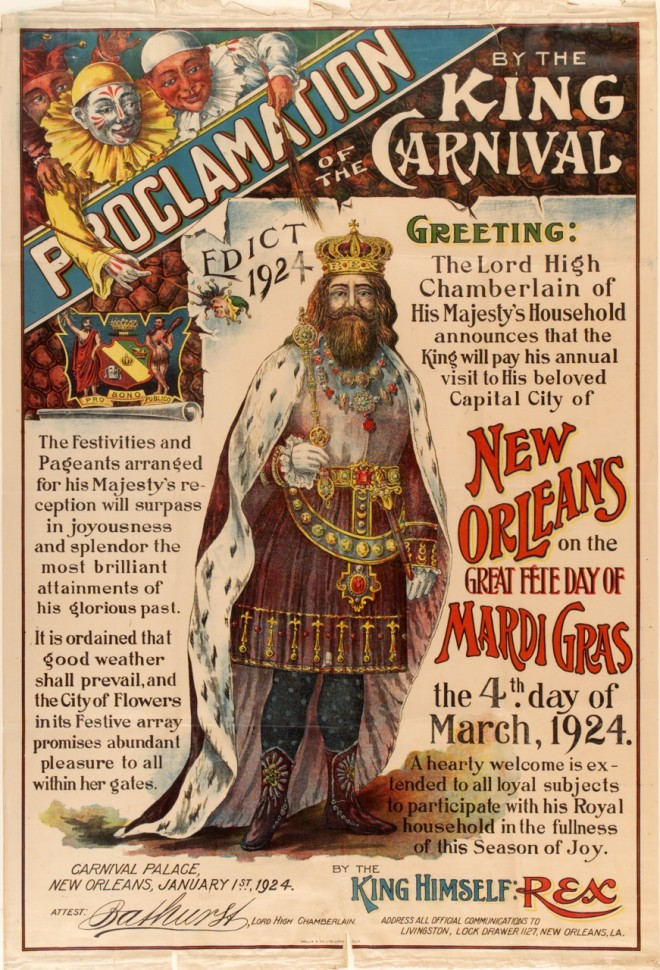
1924

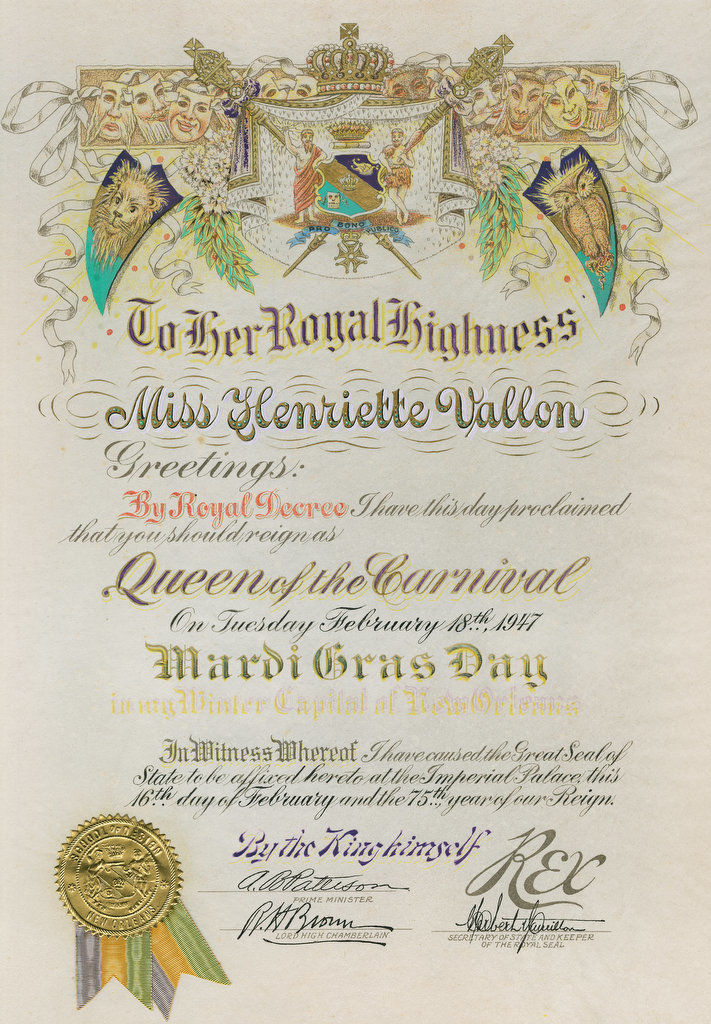
1947

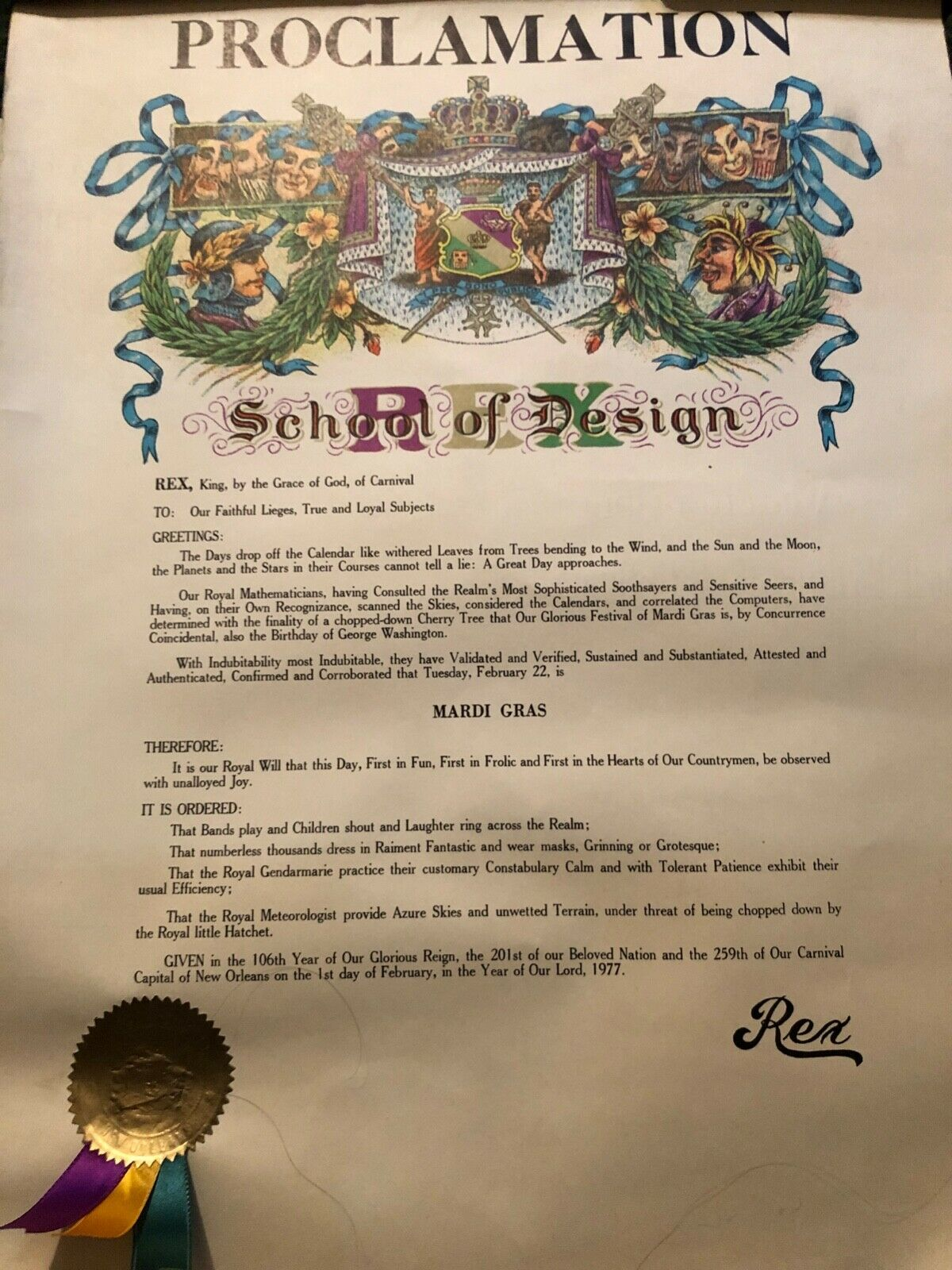
1977

=== Tableau ===
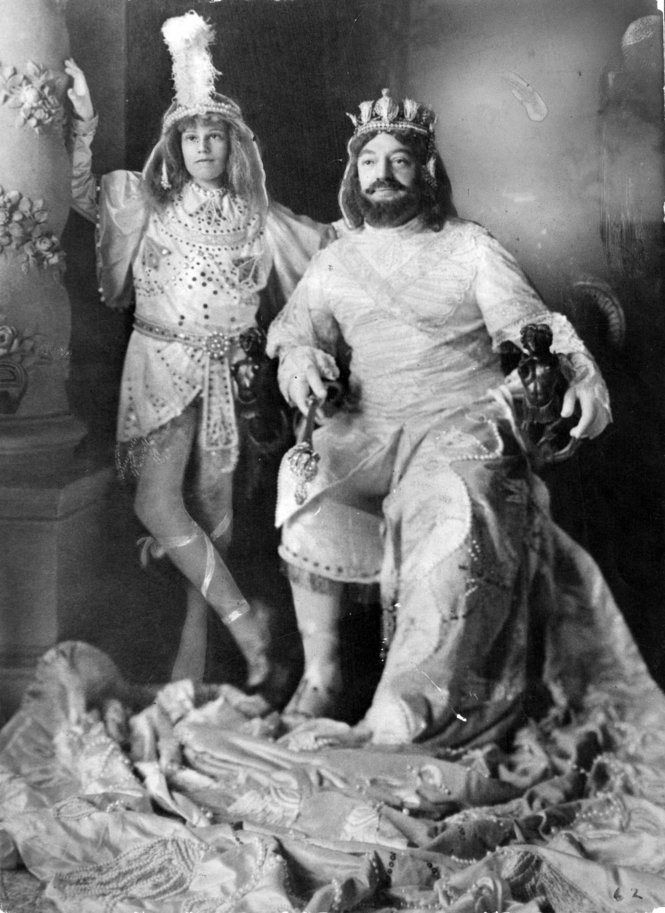
George W. Clay was Rex, king of Carnival, in 1912, and his son, George W. Clay Jr., was a page.

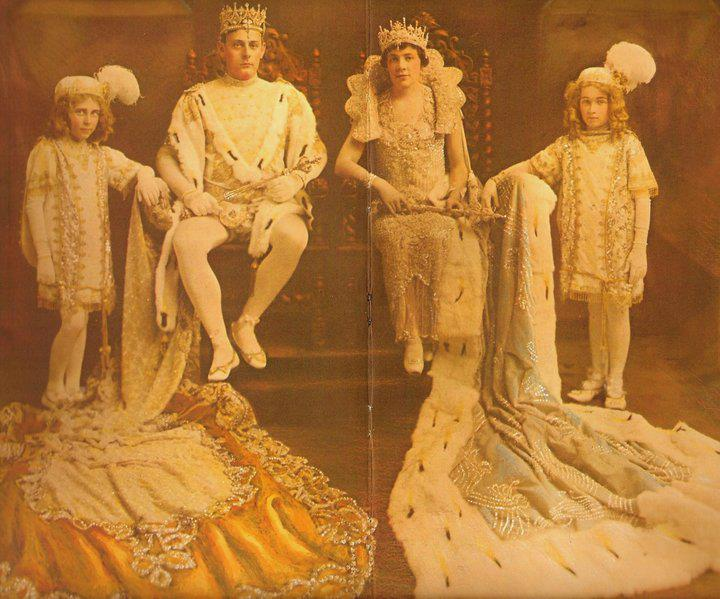
New Orleans Mardi Gras, 1915. King and Queen of Rex, enthroned flanked by pages. "Rex, King of Carnival" was Ernest L. Jahncke. His Queen was Miss Sadie Downman. The pages were Masters Paul Jahncke Jr. and Rueben Bush.

== See also ==
- The Boston Club
- Boeuf gras
- The Mistick Krewe
