= The Art of Jazz: Live in Leverkusen =

Live album by Art Blakey and the Jazz Messengers
- Released: 1996
- Recorded: October 9, 1989; Leverkusen Jazz Festival
- Genre: Jazz
- Label: IN+OUT Records
- Producer: Mike Hennessy

Art Blakey and the Jazz Messengers chronology
I Get a Kick Out of Bu (1988)	The Art of Jazz: Live in Leverkusen (1996)	Chippin' In (1989)

The Art of Jazz: Live in Leverkusen is a live album by Art Blakey's Jazz Messengers at the Leverkusen Jazz Festival in Germany on October 9, 1989. To commemorate Blakey's 70th birthday (October 11), the concert featured many special guests—most of whom were former Messengers. Singer Michelle Hendricks sang a song – "Mr. Blakey"—composed for the occasion by founding Messenger Horace Silver.

== Reception ==
Professional ratings
Review scores
Source	Rating
Allmusic	3/5 stars
The Penguin Guide to Jazz Recordings	3.5/4 stars

The album was given three stars by Allmusic, and reviewer Scott Yanow says "...the CD concludes with a nearly-13 minute interview that Mike Hennessey conducted with Blakey in 1976 in which the drummer reminisces about the Jazz Messengers' early days. Well worth picking up."

== Track listing ==
1. "Two of a Kind" (Terence Blanchard)
2. "Moanin'" (Bobby Timmons)
3. "Along Came Betty" (Benny Golson)
4. "Lester Left Town" (Wayne Shorter)
5. "Mr. Blakey" (Horace Silver)
6. Drum Duo (Drum duet with Art Blakey and Roy Haynes)
7. "Blues March" (Benny Golson)
8. Buhaina's Valediction
9. Interview

== Personnel ==
=== Jazz Messengers ===
- Art Blakey – drums
- Brian Lynch – trumpet
- Frank Lacy – trombone
- Javon Jackson – tenor saxophone
- Geoff Keezer – piano
- Essiet Okon Essiet – bass

=== Special Guests ===
- Freddie Hubbard, Terence Blanchard – trumpet
- Curtis Fuller – trombone
- Jackie McLean, Donald Harrison – alto saxophone
- Benny Golson, Wayne Shorter – tenor saxophone
- Walter Davis, Jr. – piano
- Buster Williams – bass
- Roy Haynes – drums
- Michelle Hendricks – vocals
