= Summit Meeting =

Summit Meeting may refer to:

- Summit Meeting (Elvin Jones album), 1976
- "Summit Meeting" (Voltron), 1984
- Summit Meeting (Eric Alexander album), 2001
