= Charles Joseph (musician) =

American jazz musician

- Origin: New Orleans, Louisiana, U.S.
- Genres: Jazz
- Instruments: Trombone
- Formerly of: Dirty Dozen Brass Band
- Father: Waldren Joseph
- Relatives: Kirk Joseph (brother)

Charles Joseph is an American jazz trombone player from New Orleans, Louisiana.

== Career ==
The son of trombonist Waldren Joseph, Joseph has played with the Majestic Band and Hurricane Brass Band, and was one of the founding members of the Dirty Dozen Brass Band.

He has also appeared on an Elvis Costello album and performed with his brother, sousaphonist Kirk Joseph, in Kirk Joseph's Backyard Groove band.
