= Kirk Joseph's Backyard Groove =

American jazz funk band

Kirk Joseph's Backyard Groove is a band led by sousaphone player Kirk Joseph. Formed in 2004, the group plays a "rhythmic and high-spirited concoction of jazz, funk, and afro-caribbean flavors". Aside from Joseph, the initial band members were drummer Kevin O'Day, guitarists Chris Mule and Hiro Mano, saxophonists "Sheik" Rasheed Akbar and Eric Traub, and trumpeter Raymond Anthony Williams. The band's inaugural album, Sousafunk Ave., also featured an array of guest musicians including Dr. John, Donald Harrison, Skerik, Henry Petras, and Kirk Joseph's brother, Charles Joseph.
