= Back to New Orleans =

Back to New Orleans or variants may refer to:

- Back to New Orleans, The Real World: New Orleans (2010), MTV

== Music ==
=== Albums ===
- Back to New Orleans, Brownie McGhee & Sonny Terry, 1973
- Take Me Back to New Orleans, Chris Barber, 1980
- Goin' Back to New Orleans, Dr. John, 1992
- Take Me Back to New Orleans, Gary U.S. Bonds, 1995

=== Songs ===
- "Back to New Orleans" by Lightnin' Hopkins, written Brownie McGhee & Sonny Terry
