= What's Going On (Dirty Dozen Brass Band album) =

Studio album by Dirty Dozen Brass Band
- Released: August 29, 2006
- Studios: Bismeaux; Westlake
- Genres: Hip-hop, jazz
- Length: 39:49
- Label: Shout! Factory
- Producers: Anthony Marinelli, Shawn Amos

Dirty Dozen Brass Band chronology
Funeral for a Friend (2004)	What's Going On (2006)	Twenty Dozen (2012)

What's Going On is an album by the Dirty Dozen Brass Band, released on the Shout! Factory label on August 29, 2006. It is a track-by-track remake of the 1971 Marvin Gaye album of the same name.

== Background and recording ==
Marvin Gaye originally conceived of his 1971 album What's Going On as a response to the Vietnam War and the civil rights movement. The idea of remaking What's Going On originated with Shawn Amos, who was then the vice president of artists & repertoire at Shout! Factory. Amos had previously heard many stories about how most of the Dirty Dozen Brass Band's members had been displaced by Hurricane Katrina. While he was on a flight in October 2005, Amos listened to one of Gaye's songs. He subsequently sat down with the band and talked about what was happening in their lives. During this conversation, he mentioned the timelessness of Gaye's What's Going On album, and suggested that the band should cover it. The band's members decided that this would be a good idea, and initially sought to have Amos produce the album. Amos then called up his production partner, Anthony Marinelli, and the two of them went on to produce the album.

The Dirty Dozen Brass Band's decision to remake Gaye's album was influenced by Hurricane Katrina, the government's response to the storm, and the ongoing Iraq War. The group's saxophonist, Roger Lewis, told NPR that he had been interested in covering Gaye's music for a while already, and that when Katrina hit, it seemed like the "...perfect time to do it". Lewis further explained,

[Gaye's 1971 album What's Going On] asked the question 30 years ago: 'What's going on?' What's going on with the Vietnam War and all that b------- we were going through back then - racial prejudice and selfishness and greed and everything? We still have the same social problems that we had back then. It's still the same b-------. We still got war going on, we still got prejudice, we still got drugs. The rich are getting richer, the poor are getting poorer and the middle class is caught in the middle. Who really knows what's going on?

The members of the Dirty Dozen Brass Band were initially uncertain about whether they could successfully remake Gaye's highly regarded album. This was partly because they lacked a bass guitarist who could replicate James Jamerson's famous Motown-style electric bass playing on the original album. Instead, the band decided to develop their own style in which to play Gaye's songs. As Lewis explained to The Times-Picayune, "We don't play exactly like Marvin Gaye's arrangements. You're supposed to take the music to another level, and we came up with our own ideas about how to do it."

The Dirty Dozen Brass Band recorded What's Going On at two different studios: Austin, Texas's Bismeaux Studio, owned by Ray Benson, and Westlake Recording Studios in Hollywood, California. They began recording at Westlake with an attempt at recording their version of the title track from Gaye's album, featuring Chuck D performing his original lyrics. The band spent a total of three days recording at Westlake, where most of their sessions, according to Marinelli, focused on "conceptualizing and getting those basic tracks". They then traveled to Bismeaux Studio, where they recorded for five days using Pro Tools and the studio's Automated Processes, Inc. recording equipment. Next, they traveled back to Hollywood to mix the album with Pro Tools at Marinelli and Clint Bennett's Music Forever studio.

== Release ==
What's Going On was released on August 29, 2006, on Shout! Factory, exactly a year after Hurricane Katrina first hit New Orleans and 35 years after Gaye's album was first released. Part of the proceeds from sales of the Dirty Dozen Brass Band's album were donated to Tipitina's Foundation.

== Critical reception ==
Professional ratings
Review scores
Source	Rating
The Age	4/5 stars
AllMusic	4.5/5 stars
The Cairns Post	3/5 stars
The Independent	5/5 stars
Orlando Sentinel	4/5 stars
The Palm Beach Post	B+
PopMatters	8/10
RapReviews	8/10
Slant Magazine	4/5 stars
Times Colonist	4/5

Thom Jurek of AllMusic concluded that it was "...the most fitting tribute yet to Gaye, because not only does it prove the timelessness of the music itself, it echoes that what is indeed goin' on (Gaye's dedication to Detroit as its decline became a reality with no onlookers interested in doing anything) is even more true today than it was in 1971." Sam Chennault of SF Weekly also reviewed the album favorably, describing it in 2007 as "perhaps the most fitting tribute to the [Hurricane Katrina] victims" and as "alternately brooding and invigorating". The Washington Post's Mike Joyce gave the album a generally favorable review, writing, "The music, for the most part, is so ingeniously arranged that the album colorfully accommodates several guest vocalists -- too many, in fact -- without robbing listeners of the pleasure of hearing the band swagger and shout or slide into a welcome instrumental interlude."

== Track listing ==
No.	Title	Writer(s)	Featuring	Length
1.	"What's Going On"	Renaldo Benson; Al Cleveland; Marvin Gaye	Chuck D	4:29
2.	"What's Happening Brother?"	Gaye; James Nyx Jr.	Bettye LaVette	2:52
3.	"Flyin' High (In the Friendly Sky)"	Gaye; Anna Gordy Gaye; Elgie Stover		5:07
4.	"Save the Children"	Benson; Cleveland; Gaye		5:14
5.	"God Is Love"	Gaye; A. Gaye; Stover; Nyx	Ivan Neville	4:30
6.	"Mercy Mercy Me (The Ecology)"	Gaye	G. Love	3:23
7.	"Right On"	Gaye; Earl DeRouen		4:28
8.	"Wholy Holy"	Gaye; Benson; Cleveland		3:36
9.	"Inner City Blues (Make Me Wanna Holler)"	Gaye; Nyx	Guru	6:10
Total length:				39:49

== Personnel ==
- Shawn Amos – photography, producer
- Revert Andrews – trombone
- Clint Bennett – engineer, mixing
- Beau Bonetti – assistant engineer
- Carmen Borgia – engineer, music preparation
- Doug Bossi – guitar
- Chuck D – vocals on "What's Going On"
- Gregory Michael Davis II – trumpet
- G. Love – vocals on "Mercy Mercy Me (The Ecology)"
- Guru – vocals on "Inner City Blues (Make Me Wanna Holler)"
- Terence Higgins – drums
- Emily Johnson – artwork, package supervision, photography
- Kirk Joseph – sousaphone
- Pat Kraus – mastering
- Bettye LaVette – vocals on "What's Happening Brother?"
- Roger Lewis – baritone saxophone
- Anthony Marinelli – arranger, keyboards, producer
- Jamie McLean – guitar
- Leon Mobley – percussion
- Oscar Monsalve – vocal engineer
- Ivan Neville – arranger, vocals on "God Is Love"
- Jeff Palo – producer
- Ben Peeler – guitar
- Sam Seifert – assistant engineer
- David Streja – coordination
- Efrem Towns – flugelhorn, trumpet
- Michael Weintrob – photography
