= Buck Jump =

Studio album by the Dirty Dozen Brass Band
- Released: May 25, 1999
- Genres: Jazz, R&B
- Label: Rough Trade
- Producer: John Medeski

The Dirty Dozen Brass Band chronology
This Is Jazz (1997)	Buck Jump (1999)	Medicated Magic (2002)

Buck Jump is an album by the American band the Dirty Dozen Brass Band, released on May 25, 1999. It is named for a New Orleans style of dancing. The band supported the album with a North American tour.

== Production ==
The album was produced by John Medeski, who also played organ on some of the tracks. Founding member Kirk Joseph, who had officially quit the band, played sousaphone on the album. The tracks were taken mostly from first takes. "Run Joe" is a version of the Louis Jordan song. "Old School" was created in the studio, after the band experimented with a groove. "Inner City Blues (Make Me Wanna Holler)" is a cover of the Marvin Gaye song.

== Critical reception ==
Professional ratings
Review scores
Source	Rating
All Music Guide to Soul	4/5 stars
The Encyclopedia of Popular Music	3/5 stars
Entertainment Weekly	B+
Orlando Sentinel	4.5/5 stars
Philadelphia Daily News	B
The Press of Atlantic City	3.5/4 stars
(The New) Rolling Stone Album Guide	3/5 stars
San Francisco Examiner	4/5 stars
Winnipeg Sun	4/5 stars

The Charleston Daily Mail opined that "Buck Jump qualifies the Dirty Dozen as the rightful heirs to the Meters' Crescent City crown." The Washington Post noted that the album "isn't so much an advance as a grander sonic exposition of the New Orleans ensemble's trademark sound: classic Crescent City parade band music melded with sinewy R&B and fiery jazz."

The Orlando Sentinel said that "the band skillfully fuses its funky brass-band roots with be-bop, offering up inventive solos, striking harmonies and killer grooves." Jon Pareles listed Buck Jump at No. 2 on The New York Times' list of its "Favorite CD's You Nearly Missed". The San Francisco Examiner called the album "nothing less than masterly." The Press of Atlantic City considered it "one of the most enjoyable jazz albums of 1999." The Herald-Sun ranked it at No. 4 on its list of the 11 best albums of 1999.

== Track listing ==
No.	Title	Length
1.	"Unclean Waters"
2.	"Run Joe"
3.	"Duff"
4.	"Dead Dog in the Street"
5.	"Old School"
6.	"Pet the Kat"
7.	"Inner City Blues (Make Me Wanna Holler)"
8.	"Time"
9.	"Nuttballus"
