= Leon Lee Dorsey =

American jazz bassist

- Born: March 12, 1958 (age 68)
- Education: Oberlin College
- Website: https://leonleedorsey.com/

Leon Lee Dorsey (born March 12, 1958) is an American jazz bassist, composer, arranger, producer, and educator known for his well-received debut for Landmark Records. He teaches at the Berklee School of Music in Boston.

Raised by a family plugged into Pittsburgh’s jazz lineage, Dorsey began playing instruments at an early age. He picked up the piano and cello first, soon after joining the Pittsburgh Symphony at the famed Center for the Musically Talented.

He began his undergraduate studies at Oberlin College, where he was the first to receive a B.M in classical Double Bass and Jazz Performance. Dorsey also graduated from the Oberlin Conservatory and was one of several jazz luminaries at the opening of their new jazz facility, the Bertram and Judith Kohl building.

He released his debut album The Watcher in 1995 and followed it up with 1999’s Song of Songs. In 2003, he founded Leon Lee Dorsey Studios in New York City.

Dorsey has performed alongside many jazz icons, from Lionel Hampton, Art Blakey & the Jazz Messengers, Dizzy Gillespie, Wynton Marsalis, Freddie Hubbard, John Lewis, Kenny Clarke, Jon Hendricks, Gloria Lynn, Harry “Sweets” Edison, Dorothy Donegan, Stanley Turrentine, George Benson, Ellis Marsalis, Nnenna Freelon, Terumasa Hino to GRAMMY-winning vocalist Cassandra Wilson, performing with Frank Sinatra at Carnegie Hall, and with conducting legends Lukas Foss and Robert Fountain.

== Education ==
- Classical Double Bass / Jazz Performance - Double Degree in Music (Oberlin College) - 1981
- Classical Double Bass - Master's Degree (University of Wisconsin-Madison) - 1983
- Artist Diploma Program (Hartt School of Music) - 1984
- Music Performance (Double Bass) - Master's Degree (Manhattan School of Music) - 1986
- Double Bass Performance - Doctor of Music (DMA) (Stony Brook University Graduate School) - 2016

== Discography ==
=== As leader ===
Year recorded	Title	Label	Notes
1995	The Watcher	Landmark Records	with Vincent Herring, Don Braden, Lafayette Harris Jr., Cecil Brooks III, Jimmy Madison
1999	Song of Songs	Umoja Productions	with Bryan Carrott, Carlton Holmes, Vincent Ector
2019	Monk Time	Jazz Avenue 1	with Greg Skaff, Mike Clark
2020	Play Sgt. Pepper	Jazz Avenue 1	with Michael Wolff, Mike Clark
2021	Thank You Mr. Mabern	Jazz Avenue 1	with Harold Mabern, Mike Clark
2021	Freedom Jazz Dance	Jazz Avenue 1	with Manuel Valera, Mike Clark
2022	Blues on Top	Jazz Avenue 1	with Mike LeDonne, Mike Clark
2022	Cantaloupe Island	Jazz Avenue 1	with Russell Malone, Mike Clark
2024	A Letter to Bill Evans	Jazz Avenue 1	with Michael Wolff, Mike Clark

=== As sideman ===
- I Get a Kick Out of Bu - Art Blakey & the Jazz Messengers
- Feel the Wind - Art Blakey & the Jazz Messengers w/ Freddie Hubbard
- Cookin' in the Kitchen - Lionel Hampton Orchestra
- Today's Love Songs Tomorrow's Blues - Arthur Prysock
- (Classical Chamber Music) - Manchester Festival Orchestra
- From My Heart to Your Heart - Gloria Lynne w/ David "Fathead" Newman
- Darling Please Save Your Love for Me - Dakota Stanton
- Gemini - Archie Shepp Quartet w/ John Hicks, Charlie Persip
- Otherside - Oliver Lake Big Band w/ John Stubblefield, Frank Lacy
- New York Story - Hilton Ruiz w/ George Coleman, Grady Tate
- Steppin’ with T.P. - Hilton Ruiz w/ Dave Valentin, Antonio Hart
- Swing ‘em Gates - Jay Hoggard w/ Billy Taylor, Winard Harper
- Twilight Blues - Roy Meriwether w/ Houston Person
- Song for My Sister - Roscoe Mitchell
- Renewal of the Spirit - Vincent Ector w/ Bobby Watson
- Lovecentric - Gerry Eastman w/ Joe Ford, Newman Baker
- Vignettes in the Spirit of Ellington - James 'Jabbo' Ware
- Something is Coming - James 'Jabbo' Ware
- Gilly’s Caper - Sue Terry w/ Saul Reuben, Vince Ector
- The Standard Session - Stephen Zinnato w/ Frank Wess, Charlie Persip
- The 5 A.M. Strut - Ezra Weiss w/ Billy Hart, Antonio Hart, Mike Mossman
- Persephone - Ezra Weiss w/ Billy Hart, Antonio Hart, Mike Mossman
- Miles Away...Wayne in Heavy - Eric Gould
- Who Sez - Eric Gould
- Great Spirit - Jim Finn
- Sax and the Single Girl - Gail Allen
- What is This Thing Called Jazz - Laura Theodore
- For Four Orchestras - Anthony Braxton w/ Oberlin Orchestra
- Head Music - The Daou (Underground Dance-Rock)
