= Ron Anthony =

American jazz guitarist and singer (1933–2021)

- Born: December 16, 1933; Pittsburgh, Pennsylvania, U.S.
- Died: January 19, 2021 (aged 87)
- Genres: Jazz
- Instrument(s): Guitar, vocals
- Years active: 1951–2021

Ron Anthony (December 16, 1933 – January 19, 2021) was an American jazz guitarist and singer.

== Early life ==
The son of a postal worker, Anthony was born and raised in Pittsburgh. He got his first guitar when he was sixteen, taking lessons from a teacher in Pittsburgh who admired Andres Segovia, Oscar Moore, and Django Reinhardt. Through his teacher, Anthony met Joe Negri, who became an influence. He joined a quartet and performed at clubs in Pittsburgh. His father suggested he join the United States Army so he could get a G.I. loan if he ever wanted to buy a house. In 1956, Anthony entered the Special Services and played in a jazz band, first on double bass and later on guitar.

== Career ==
When he returned home, he attended Duquesne University for one year, then moved to New York City. Lee Konitz, Warne Marsh, and Lennie Tristano frequently visited his house for jam sessions. He befriended Billy Bean, who he considered "the essence of what a jazz guitarist was supposed to be. He had the harmony things down, he could swing, he had great right hand technique, and he could read well." He spent nearly every day with Bean playing jazz, and he studied classical guitar, though he used a plectrum. Through Negri he met Barry Galbraith, who found him a job with George Shearing. He became friends with Wes Montgomery after Montgomery visited a club one night where the Shearing band was playing. Gary Burton played vibraphone for Shearing during this time. When he left to work with Stan Getz, he recommended Anthony, but Anthony returned to Pittsburgh and formed a band.

In 1965, Anthony moved to Los Angeles, working first in the big band of Tex Beneke. Through contacts, he found jobs with Les Brown, Stan Kenton, and Vic Damone. With Damone he accompanied Bob Hope on a USO tour of Vietnam. He received an offer from Joe Pass to return to Shearing because Pass was leaving the band. Anthony intended to substitute briefly, but he remained with Shearing for another four years. In 1984 Anthony played in a trio for a party given by Frank Sinatra for Nancy Reagan. Two years later he was invited to replace Tony Mottola in Sinatra's band. Anthony played most of Sinatra's performances until Sinatra's death. He played in a trio for Sinatra's funeral.

Ron Anthony was the uncle of jazz guitarist Ron Affif.
