= Nicholas Payton =

American musician (born 1973)

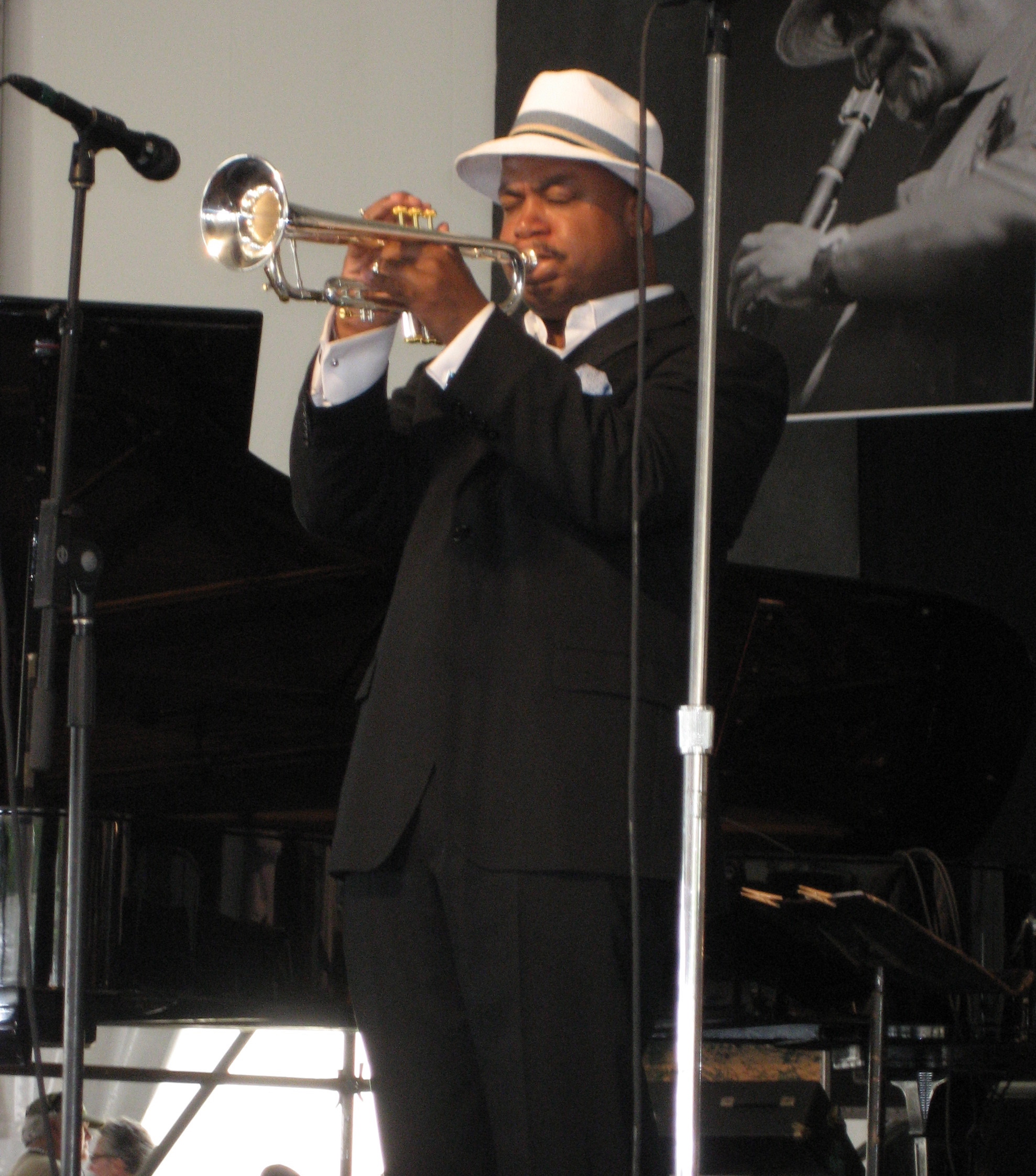
- Payton playing at the New Orleans Jazz & Heritage Festival, May 5, 2007

Background information
- Born: September 26, 1973 (age 53); New Orleans, Louisiana, U.S.
- Genres: Jazz, jazz fusion
- Occupation: Musician
- Instruments: Trumpet, electric piano
- Years active: 1990–present
- Labels: Verve, Warner Bros., Blue Note/EMI, Nonesuch
- Website: Official website

Nicholas Payton (born September 26, 1973) is an American trumpet player and multi-instrumentalist. A Grammy Award winner, he is from New Orleans, Louisiana. He is also a writer who comments on subjects including music, race, politics, and life in America.

== Biography ==
The son of bassist and sousaphonist Walter Payton, he began playing the trumpet at the age of four and by age nine was sitting in with the Young Tuxedo Brass Band, alongside his father. He began his professional career at ten years old as a member of James Andrews' All-Star Brass and was given his first steady gig by guitarist Danny Barker at The Famous Door on Bourbon Street. He enrolled at the New Orleans Center for Creative Arts and then at the University of New Orleans.

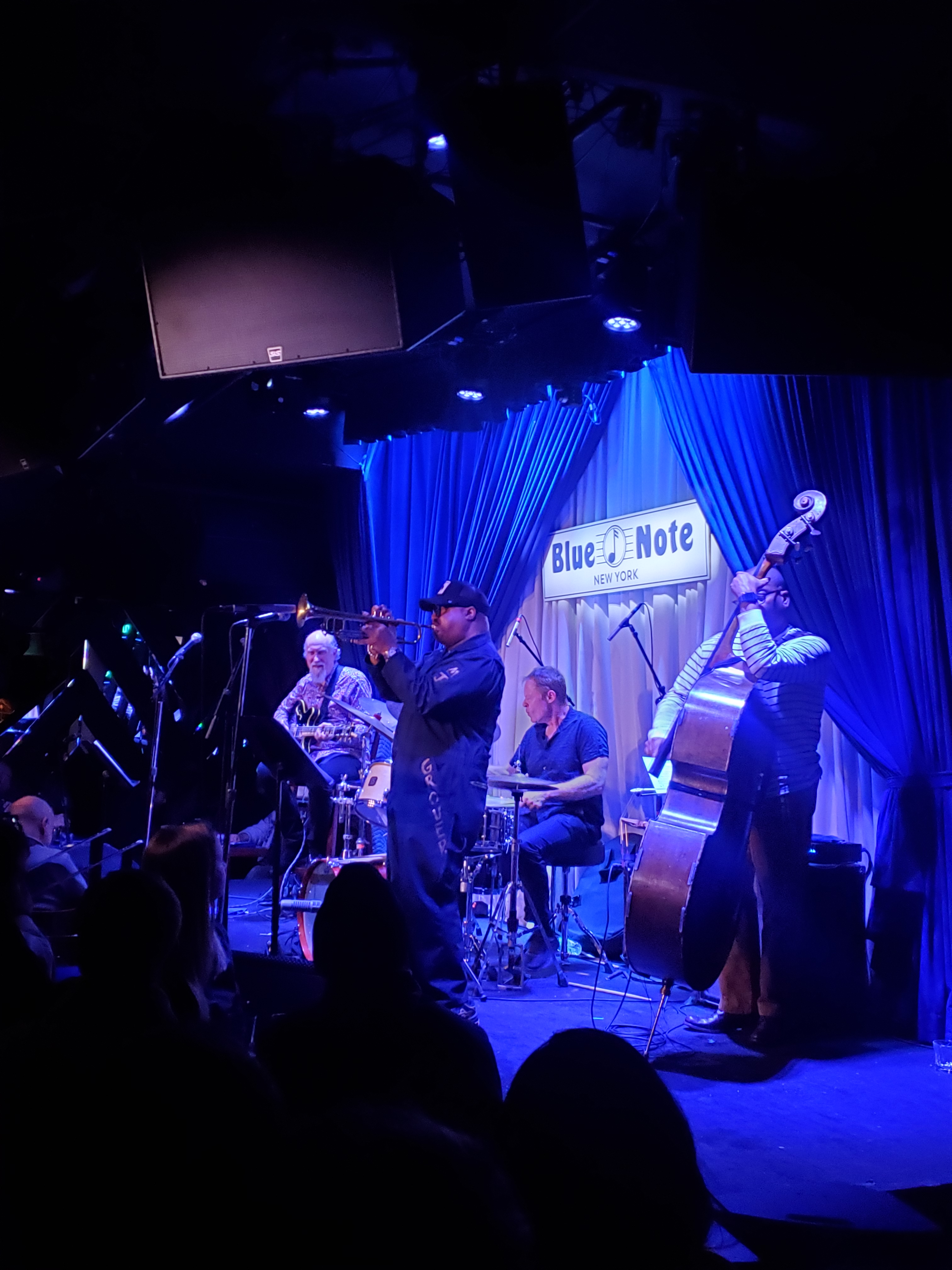
Nicholas Payton with John Scofield (guitar) and Vicente Archer (bass) at The Blue Note Jazz Club, NYC

After touring with Marcus Roberts and Elvin Jones in the early 1990s, Payton signed a contract with Verve Records; his first album, From This Moment, appeared in 1995. In 1996, he performed on the soundtrack of the movie Kansas City, and in 1997, received a Grammy Award (Best Instrumental Solo) for his playing on the album Doc Cheatham & Nicholas Payton.

After seven albums on Verve, Payton signed with Warner Bros. Records, releasing Sonic Trance, his first album on the new label, in 2003. Besides his recordings under his own name, other significant collaborations include Trey Anastasio, Ray Brown, Ray Charles, Daniel Lanois, Dr. John, Stanley Jordan, Herbie Hancock, Roy Haynes, Zigaboo Modeliste, Marcus Roberts, Jill Scott, Clark Terry, Allen Toussaint, Nancy Wilson, Dr. Michael White, and Joe Henderson.

In 2004, he became a founding member of the SFJAZZ Collective. In 2008, he joined The Blue Note 7, a septet formed in honor of the 70th anniversary of Blue Note Records. In 2011, he formed a 21-piece big band ensemble called the Television Studio Orchestra. In 2011, he also recorded and released Bitches, a love narrative on which he played every instrument, sang, and wrote all of the music. In 2012, the Czech National Symphony Orchestra commissioned and debuted his first full orchestral work, The Black American Symphony. And in 2013, he formed his own record label, BMF Records, and the same year released two albums, #BAM Live at Bohemian Caverns, where he plays both trumpet and Fender Rhodes, often at once, and Sketches of Spain, which he recorded with the Basel Symphony Orchestra in Switzerland.

In 2024, he was announced as chair of the Brass Department at Berklee College of Music.

== Controversial statements, dismissal from Berklee ==
In 2025, renewed public attention was given to past statements made by Nicholas Payton, some dating back to 2010, which critics described as antisemitic. Payton rejected these characterizations, stating that his remarks were taken out of context and did not reflect antisemitic views.

Similar allegations had previously been raised in 2021 during Payton’s tenure as a visiting artist at the Berklee College of Music. According to Payton, Berklee reviewed the matter at that time and Nicholas was permitted to continue his affiliation with the institution. He remained associated with Berklee in subsequent years and was appointed Chair of the Brass Department in 2024.

In 2025, Berklee College of Music ended Payton’s appointment as Chair following renewed public discussion of the earlier allegations. Berklee did not publicly release detailed findings or a formal statement outlining the basis for the decision. Payton stated that he was not provided with a formal review process or explanation and reiterated his denial of the allegations.

== Discography ==
=== As leader/co-leader ===
- From This Moment (Verve, 1995) – rec. 1994
- Gumbo Nouveau (Verve, 1996)
- Doc Cheatham & Nicholas Payton with Doc Cheatham (Verve, 1997) – rec. 1996
- Payton's Place (Verve, 1998) – rec. 1997–1998
- Nick@Night (Verve, 1999)
- Dear Louis (Verve, 2001) – rec. 2000
- Sonic Trance (Warner Bros., 2003)
- Live in New York 1.24.04 with Sonic Trance (Kufala Recordings, 2004) – live
- Into the Blue (Nonesuch, 2008) – rec. 2007
- Bitches (In+Out, 2011)
- Live at 2012 New Orleans Jazz & Heritage Festival (Munck Mix, 2012) – live
- #BAM: Live at Bohemian Caverns (BMF, 2013) – live rec. 2012
- Sketches of Spain with Sinfonieorchester Basel (BMF, 2013) – live
- Numbers (Paytone, 2014)
- Letters (Paytone, 2015)[2CD]
- Textures (Paytone, 2016)
- Afro-Caribbean Mixtape (Paytone, 2017)[2CD] – rec. 2016
- Relaxin' with Nick (Smoke Sessions, 2019)[2CD]
- Quarantined with Nick (Paytone, 2020)
- Maestro Rhythm King (Paytone, 2020)
- Smoke Sessions (Smoke Sessions, 2021)
- The Couch Sessions (Smoke Sessions, 2022)
- Drip (Paytone, 2023)
- A Supreme Blue with Butcher Brown (Concord Jazz, 2026)

Collaborations
With Christian McBride and Mark Whitfield

- Fingerpainting: The Music of Herbie Hancock (Verve, 1997)

With Bob Belden, John Hart, Sam Yahel and Billy Drummond

- Mysterious Shorter (Chesky, 2006)

With Terri Lyne Carrington, Kris Davis, Linda May Han Oh and Matthew Stevens

- New Standards, Vol. 1 (Candid, 2022)

With Esperanza Spalding and Karriem Riggins

- Triune (Smoke Sessions, 2025)

=== As a member ===
New Orleans Collective
With Wessell Anderson, Christopher Thomas, Peter Martin and Brian Blade

- New Orleans Collective (Paddle Wheel, 1993)

SFJAZZ Collective (2004–2006)

- SFJazz Collective (Nonesuch, 2005) – live rec. 2004
- SFJazz Collective 2 (Nonesuch, 2006) – live rec. 2005

The Blue Note 7 (2008–2009)

- Mosaic: A Celebration of Blue Note Records (Blue Note, 2009) – rec. 2008

=== As sideman/guest ===
With Elvin Jones

- Youngblood (Enja, 1992)
- Going Home (Enja, 1993) – rec. 1992
- It Don't Mean a Thing (Enja, 1994) – rec. 1993

With Greg Osby

- St. Louis Shoes (Blue Note, 2003)
- Public (Blue Note, 2004)

With Jimmy Smith

- Damn! (Verve, 1995)
- Angel Eyes: Ballads & Slow Jams (Verve, 1996) – rec. 1995

With others

- Eric Alexander, Summit Meeting (Milestone, 2002)
- Joanne Brackeen, Pink Elephant Magic (Arkadia Jazz, 1999)
- Faye Carol, Faye Sings The Blues (Getdown, 2026)
- Bill Charlap, Plays George Gershwin: The American Soul (Blue Note, 2005)
- Common, Electric Circus (MCA, 2002)
- The Headhunters, Evolution Revolution (Basin Street, 2003)
- Joe Henderson, Big Band (Verve, 1997)
- Doc Houlind, New Orleans Sessions (Music Mecca, 1995)
- Dr. John, N'Awlinz: Dis Dat or d'Udda (Blue Note, 2004)
- Abbey Lincoln, Wholly Earth (Verve/Gitanes Jazz, 1999)
- Joshua Redman, Where Are We (Blue Note, 2023)
- Eric Reed, Musicale (Impulse!/GRP, 1996)
- Yu Sakai, Touch the World (Newborder Recordings, 2020)
- Allen Toussaint, The Bright Mississippi (Nonesuch, 2009)

== Awards and nominations ==
Year	Result	Award	Category	Work
1997	Won	Grammy Award	Best Jazz Instrumental Solo	"Stardust" in Doc Cheatham & Nicholas Payton
1997	Nominated	Grammy Award	Best Jazz Instrumental Performance, Individual or Group	Doc Cheatham & Nicholas Payton with Doc Cheatham
2001	Nominated	Grammy Award	Best Large Jazz Ensemble Album	Dear Louis
2003	Nominated	Grammy Award	Best Contemporary Jazz Album	Sonic Trance
2023	Won	Grammy Award	Best Jazz Instrumental Album	New Standards Vol. 1 with Terri Lyne Carrington, Kris Davis, Linda May Han Oh, and Matthew Stevens
