= Live in New York 1.24.04 =

Live album by Nicholas Payton & Sonic Trance
- Released: 2004
- Recorded: January 24. 2004
- Genre: Jazz
- Length: 57:30
- Label: Kufala Recordings

Nicholas Payton & Sonic Trance chronology
Sonic Trance (2003)	Live in New York 1.24.04 (2004)	Mysterious Shorter (2006)

Professional ratings
Review scores
Source	Rating
All About Jazz	link

Live in New York 1.24.04 is the second recording, and first live recording, by Nicholas Payton's electric jazz band Sonic Trance. It was recorded live at the 2004 International Association for Jazz Education (IAJE) conference in New York City.

The recording originally circulated as a bootleg, but became so popular that Payton authorized a limited release by Kufala Recordings, a label that specializes in authorized live recordings. In 2009, the recording was reissued by Kufala as both a CD and MP3 download. The CD began shipping on February 2.

== Track listing ==
1. [intro] – 0:22
2. Seance – 2:27
3. Fela – 6:12
4. Cannabis Leaf Rag – 4:44
5. Concentric Circles – 10:02
6. Go Round – 3:06
7. Blu Hays – 5:56
8. Two Mexicans on the Wall – 7:35
9. I'm Trying to Swing as Little as Possible – 4:16
10. Stardust – 6:12
11. Silence – 6:47

== Personnel ==
- Nicholas Payton – trumpet
- Tim Warfield – saxophones
- Scott Kinsey – keyboards
- Vincente Archer – bass
- Adonis Rose – drums
- Daniel Sadownick – percussion

== References and external links ==
- Kufala Recordings
- All About Jazz review
- Amazon MP3 download
