= Chippin' In =

Studio album by Art Blakey and the Jazz Messengers
- Released: 1990
- Recorded: February 1 & 2, 1990
- Studios: Van Gelder Studio, Englewood Cliffs, New Jersey
- Genre: Jazz
- Length: 70:06
- Labels: Timeless; SJP 340
- Producers: Billy Hoogstraten & Russ Musto

Art Blakey chronology
| The Art of Jazz: Live in Leverkusen (1989) | Chippin' In (1990) | Bluesiana Triangle (1990) |

The Jazz Messengers chronology
| The Art of Jazz: Live in Leverkusen (1989) | Chippin' In (1990) | One for All (1990) |

Chippin' In is an album by drummer Art Blakey and The Jazz Messengers recorded in 1990 and released on the Dutch Timeless label.

== Reception ==
Professional ratings
Review scores
| Source | Rating |
|---|---|
| Allmusic | 3/5 stars |

Scott Yanow of Allmusic stated "35 years after first officially forming The Jazz Messengers, drummer Art Blakey entered his final year still at it. Due to the many promising young players around at the time, Blakey expanded The Messengers from its usual quintet or sextet into a septet for this fine recording session... Because Blakey constantly persuaded his musicians to write music, The Jazz Messengers stayed young in spirit, just like its leader. A fine effort".

== Track listing ==
All compositions by Brian Lynch except where noted

1. "Brain Stormin'" (Geoff Keezer) - 6:31
2. "Byrdflight" - 6:18
3. "Hammer Head" (Wayne Shorter) - 6:50
4. "Aquarius Rising" (Frank Lacy) - 5:26
5. "Kay Pea" (Javon Jackson) - 5:58
6. "Chippin' In" - 9:56
7. "Raincheck" (Billy Strayhorn, arranged by Geoff Keezer) - 5:34
8. "Chandek's Den" - 6:20
9. "Kenji's Walk" (Art Blakey) - 8:57
10. "Love Walked In" (George Gershwin, Ira Gershwin) - 8:16

== Personnel ==
- Art Blakey - drums
- Brian Lynch - trumpet (tracks 1–8 & 10)
- Steve Davis (tracks 1, 7 & 8), Frank Lacy (tracks 2–6 & 10) - trombone
- Dale Barlow, Javon Jackson - tenor saxophone (tracks 1–8 & 10)
- Geoff Keezer - piano (tracks 1–8 & 10)
- Essiet Okon Essiet - bass (tracks 1–8 & 10)
