= Afterglow (Dr. John album) =

Studio album by Dr. John
- Released: 1995
- Studio: Capitol, Hollywood, California; Bill Schnee, North Hollywood, California
- Genre: Big band
- Label: Blue Thumb
- Producer: Tommy LiPuma

Dr. John chronology
Television (1994)	Afterglow (1995)	The Very Best of Dr. John (1995)

Afterglow is an album by the American musician Dr. John, released in 1995. The majority of the tracks are covers of jazz and blues songs from the 1940s and 1950s; many of the songs were introduced to Dr. John by his parents.

The album peaked at No. 7 on Billboard's Traditional Jazz Albums chart. Dr. John supported the album by playing shows with the Afterglow Big Band.

== Production ==
The album was produced by Tommy LiPuma, with arrangements by John Clayton and Alan Broadbent. It was engineered by Al Schmitt, who was nominated for a Grammy Award. Dr. John used a 20-piece string section to back his 19-member band; Ray Brown led the rhythm section.

"New York City Blues" and "There Must Be a Better World Somewhere" were cowritten by Dr. John and Doc Pomus. "I Know What I've Got" is a cover of the Louis Jordan song; "Blue Skies" was written by Irving Berlin.

== Critical reception ==
Professional ratings
Review scores
Source	Rating
AllMusic	3/5 stars
The Encyclopedia of Popular Music	2/5 stars
MusicHound Rock: The Essential Album Guide	3/5 stars
Orlando Sentinel	4/5 stars
(The New) Rolling Stone Album Guide	2/5 stars
The Tampa Tribune	3.5/4 stars
Windsor Star	B

The Guardian called the album an "elegant homage to the torch songs of yesteryear." The Windsor Star deemed it "too polite to count as a Dr. John album, and too New Orleans-bluesy to be a legitimate big-band album." The Globe and Mail considered it "a sweet exercise in pop nostalgia."

The Orlando Sentinel noted that the album "harks back to the lush, big-band sound that served the singer, songwriter, pianist and guitarist so well on 1989's In a Sentimental Mood." The New York Times stated that Dr. John "rambles nostalgically down pop-blues trails originally blazed by Ray Charles... The singing is sultry and swinging." The Independent opined that the album is "spoilt by a showbiz orchestra that varnishes over his shaggy greatness."

AllMusic praised Dr. John's "gravel-and-honey voice." (The New) Rolling Stone Album Guide dismissed the album as "empty pop."

== Track listing ==
No.	Title	Writer(s)	Length
1.	"I Know What I've Got"	Louis Jordan, Sid Robin	5:01
2.	"Gee Baby Ain't I Good to You"	Andy Razaf, Don Redman	4:18
3.	"I'm Just a Lucky So-and-So"	Duke Ellington, Mack David	3:33
4.	"Blue Skies"	Irving Berlin	4:42
5.	"So Long"	Irving Melsher, Remus Harris, Russ Morgan	5:04
6.	"New York City Blues"	Doc Pomus, Mac Rebennack	4:00
7.	"Tell Me You'll Wait for Me"	Charles Brown, Oscar Moore	4:39
8.	"There Must Be a Better World Somewhere"	Doc Pomus, Mac Rebennack	5:21
9.	"I Still Think About You"	Mac Rebennack	4:18
10.	"I'm Confessin' (That I Love You)"	Al Neiburg, Doc Daugherty, Ellis Reynolds	4:27

== Personnel ==
- Dr. John – piano, vocals
- Phil Upchurch – guitar
- John Clayton, Ray Brown – bass guitar
- Jeff Hamilton – drums
- Larry Bunker – percussion, vibraphone
- Lenny Castro – percussion

Technical

- Al Schmitt – recording, mixing
