= It Don't Mean a Thing (album) =

Studio album by Elvin Jones
- Released: 1994
- Recorded: October 18–19, 1993; Brooklyn, New York
- Genre: Jazz
- Length: 57:29
- Label: Enja; ENJ 8066-1
- Producer: Matthias Winckelmann

Elvin Jones chronology
Tribute to John Coltrane "A Love Supreme" (1992)	It Don't Mean a Thing (1994)	Momentum Space (1998)

It Don't Mean a Thing is an album by jazz drummer Elvin Jones recorded in 1993 and released on the Enja label.

== Reception ==
The Allmusic review called the album "one of the most well-rounded sets he has ever led. The lineup of musicians is very impressive... And as for the drummer, there is still no one around who has captured the sound and spirit of Elvin Jones".

Professional ratings
Review scores
Source	Rating
Allmusic	4.5/5 stars

== Track listing ==
All compositions by Keiko Jones except as indicated

1. "Green Chimneys" (Thelonious Monk) – 6:58
2. "A Lullaby of Itsugo Village" (Traditional arranged Keiko Jones) – 6:04
3. "It Don't Mean a Thing (If It Ain't Got That Swing)" (Duke Ellington, Irving Mills) – 5:39
4. "Lush Life" (Billy Strayhorn) – 6:41
5. "Zenzo's Spirit" – 6:54
6. "A Flower Is a Lovesome Thing/Ask Me Now" (Strayhorn/Monk) – 9:06
7. "Bopsy" (Kevin Mahogany) – 4:18
8. "Fatima's Waltz" – 6:26
9. "A Change Is Gonna Come" (Sam Cooke) – 5:23

== Personnel ==
- Elvin Jones – drums
- Nicholas Payton – trumpet
- Delfeayo Marsalis – trombone
- Sonny Fortune – flute, tenor saxophone
- Willie Pickens – piano
- Cecil McBee – bass
- Kevin Mahogany – vocals (tracks 4 & 7)
