= A Celebration of New Orleans Music to Benefit MusiCares Hurricane Relief 2005 =

Studio album by Various Artists
- Released: October 18, 2005
- Genre: Jazz
- Length: 73:53
- Labels: Rounder; Marsalis Music

Professional ratings
Review scores
Source	Rating
Allmusic	3.5/5 stars

A Celebration of New Orleans Music to Benefit MusiCares Hurricane Relief 2005 is a benefit album, with tracks "from the vault" by an array of New Orleans artists.

A collection of recordings to celebrate New Orleans, moving from second-line brass band music and R&B to modern jazz, Mardi Gras Indian music and gospel, spanning 65 years of recording.

The proceeds will be given to the MusiCares Hurricane Relief Fund, providing assistance to musicians and other music industry people directly affected by Hurricane Katrina.

== Track listing ==
No.	Title	Performing Artist(s)	Length
1.	"Mardi Gras In New Orleans"	Dirty Dozen Brass Band	5:25
2.	"Something You Got"	Davell Crawford	3:43
3.	"Good To Be Home"	Harry Connick, Jr.	6:25
4.	"Second Line Medley: I Done Got Over; Iko Iko; Hey Pocky Way"	Irma Thomas	10:20
5.	"Carnival Time"	Al Johnson	2:39
6.	"Meet De Boys On De Battlefront"	Bo Dollis, The Wild Magnolias	5:30
7.	"Check Mr. Popeye"	Eddie Bo	2:13
8.	"Do Whatcha Wanna Pt. 3"	Rebirth Brass Band	4:28
9.	"I'm Alabama Bound"	Jelly Roll Morton	4:03
10.	"Lawdy Miss Clawdy"	James Booker	3:24
11.	"I Get Lifted"	Theryl DeClouet, Galactic	3:07
12.	"Keep On Gwine"	New Orleans Nightcrawlers	5:11
13.	"B's Paris Blues"	Branford Marsalis Quartet	4:27
14.	"Cuttin' Out"	Professor Longhair	2:36
15.	"Funkyard"	Walter "Wolfman" Washington & The Roadmasters	4:57
16.	"Never Alone"	Johnny Adams, Aaron Neville	4:54

*Liner notes by Branford Marsalis
