= Nextep =

2008 studio album by Benny Powell

Studio album by Benny Powell
- Released: 2008
- Recorded: February 9–10, 2007
- Studios: Alleycat Studio, South Orange, New Jersey
- Genre: Jazz
- Labels: Origin; 82517
- Producers: Benny Powell, Brian Grady

Benny Powell chronology
The Gift of Love (2003)	Nextep (2008)

Nextep is an album by trombonist Benny Powell. Featuring ten original compositions by Powell, his band members, and his ex-wife, it was recorded on February 9 and 10, 2007, at Alleycat Studio in South Orange, New Jersey, and was issued on CD in 2008 by Origin Records, Powell's last release as a leader. On the album, Powell is joined by saxophonist and flutist T. K. Blue, pianist Sayuri Goto, double bassist Essiet Okon Essiet, and drummer Billy Hart.

In an interview, Powell stated: "The album is a culmination of New Orleans Second Line marching music, and rhythms from South Africa and the Caribbean. I called it Nextep because our next step is to be recognized as composers of original songs."

== Reception ==
Professional ratings
Review scores
Source	Rating
All About Jazz	4.5/5 stars
AllMusic	4/5 stars
DownBeat	3.5/5 stars
Tom Hull – on the Web	B−

In a review for DownBeat, John Ephland wrote: "This album is ripe with personality. Every cut evokes the aura of its leader... And each cut is different from the one that came before it... with this combination of players and repertoire, we get something worth listening to."

AllMusic's Adam Greenberg stated: "...it's a special treat when a trombone actually works in the front of an ensemble. Here though, it's not just the trombone behind the album's success; it's the core trio behind the compositions... and their sparkling solos, as well as a solid rhythm section that can easily maneuver from a Caribbean groove to a late-night blues riff without missing a step."

Dan McClenaghan of All About Jazz commented: "Powell assembles an ensemble of players of diverse backgrounds and gives them a free rein, and comes up with a gem of an album... Nextep is a wonderful example of a band full of players with disparate approaches coming together and creating beautifully fresh-sounding music, with the supple-toned trombonist Benny Powell at the helm." AAJ writer Andrew Velez remarked: "Powell has said he thinks this is his best CD to date. Overflowing with strong, original music, it is absolutely first class all the way."

Writing for JazzTimes, Will Smith noted: "Powell may have lost a step or two with regard to his solo work on Nextep... yet he's still out there offering an abundance of music worth hearing with an often sprightly, burnished sound, and is clearly not slowing down... With widely varied music tinged by New Orleans, South African, Brazilian and Caribbean rhythms, the blues and bop, Powell and sidemen... move through this batch of original works with a relaxed grace and charm."

== Track listing ==
1. "Free to Be Me" (T.K. Blue) – 5:34
2. "The Township Diary" (T.K. Blue) – 5:34
3. "Best People" (Sayuri Goto) – 5:06
4. "Akiha" (Sayuri Goto) – 5:57
5. "Another Blue" (T. K. Blue) – 6:18
6. "Night, Never End" (Sayuri Goto) – 6:38
7. "I Tried and Tried" (Petsye Powell) – 5:20
8. "A Single Tear of Remembrance" (T.K. Blue) – 7:18
9. "You Got It" (Benny Powell) – 5:31
10. "The Caribbean Express" (T.K. Blue) – 4:28

== Personnel ==
- Benny Powell – trombone
- T. K. Blue – alto saxophone, flute, soprano saxophone
- Sayuri Goto – piano
- Essiet Okon Essiet – double bass
- Billy Hart – drums
