= Ron Affif =

American jazz guitarist

- Birth name: Ronaldo Antunacci Charles Affif
- Born: December 30, 1965 (age 59); Pittsburgh, Pennsylvania, U.S.
- Genres: Jazz
- Occupation: Musician
- Instrument: Guitar
- Years active: 1984–present
- Labels: Pablo

Ronaldo Antunacci Charles Affif (December 30, 1965), known professionally as Ron Affif, is an American jazz guitarist of Lebanese and Italian origin. He is the son of boxer Charley Zivic, who was a jazz fan and encouraged his son.

== Career ==
Born Ronaldo Antunacci Charles Affif in Pittsburgh, he is mostly self-taught. At the age of twelve, he took lessons from his uncle, guitarist Ron Anthony.

In 1984, after graduating from high school, he moved to Los Angeles, was taught by Joe Pass, and worked with Dick Berk, Pete Christlieb, Dave Pike, and Jack Sheldon, then a couple years later moved to New York City. He led a band which included Colin Bailey, Brian O'Rourke, Andy Simpkins, and Sherman Ferguson. In the 1990s, formed a trio with Essiet Essiet and Jeff "Tain" Watts in New York City. He has worked with Michael Carvin, David Kikoski, Ralph Lalama, and Leon Parker.

== Discography ==
=== As Leader ===
Year recorded	Title	Label	Personnel/Notes
1992	Ron Affif	Pablo	With Brian O'Rourke (piano), Andy Simpkins (bass), Colin Bailey (drums)
1993	Vierd Blues	Pablo	With Brian O'Rourke (piano), Andy Simpkins (bass), Colin Bailey (drums), Brian Kilgore, percussion 1,9.
1995	52nd Street	Pablo	With Essiet Essiet (bass), Jeff "Tain" Watts (drums)
1997	Ringside	Pablo	With Essiet Essiet (bass), Colin Bailey(drums)
1999	Solotude	Pablo	Ron Affif (solo guitar)
2005	Ron Affif Trio-Affif-Griglak-Valihora	Hevhetia (Slovak)	With Juraj Griglak (bass), Martin Valihora (drums)

=== As sideman ===
- Joe Ascione Post Bill Bills (Arbors, 1998)
- Miri Ben-Ari,The Temple of Beautiful (Half Note, 2003)
- Alexis Cole, Zingaro (Canopy 2007)
- Allan Harris, Love Came: The Songs of Strayhorn (2001)
- Steve Hass, Traveler (2003)
- Donna Lewis, Brand New Day (Palmetto, 2015)
- John Pisano, Among Friends (Pablo, 1995)
