= Payton's Place =

Studio album by Nicholas Payton
- Released: June 9, 1998
- Recorded: September 29, 1997 – January 6, 1998
- Studio: Avatar, New York City
- Genre: Jazz
- Length: 71:05
- Label: PolyGram Records

Nicholas Payton chronology
Doc Cheatham & Nicholas Payton (1997)	Payton's Place (1998)	Nick@Night (1999)

Professional ratings
Review scores
Source	Rating
AllMusic	3/5 stars
The Penguin Guide to Jazz Recordings	3.5/4 stars

Payton's Place is an album by the jazz trumpeter Nicholas Payton, released in 1998.

== Track listing ==
All songs compositions by Nicholas Payton, except as indicated.

1. Zigaboogaloo – 5:53
2. The Three Trumpeteers – 5:26
3. Back to the Source – 6:27
4. A Touch of Silver – 5:12
5. Concentric Circles – 7:08
6. Li'l Duke's Strut – 5:06
7. Time Traveling – 5:36
8. With a Song in My Heart – 5:35 (Richard Rodgers, Lorenz Hart)
9. Paraphernalia – 9:39 (Wayne Shorter)
10. Brownie à la Mode – 4:17
11. People Make the World Go Round – 5:21 (Thom Bell, Linda Creed)
12. The Last Goodbye – 5:25

== Personnel ==
- Nicholas Payton - trumpet
- Tim Warfield - tenor saxophone
- Anthony Wonsey - piano
- Reuben Rogers - bass
- Adonis Rose - drums

Special guests

- Wynton Marsalis - trumpet (#2,10)
- Roy Hargrove - trumpet (#2, 8)
- Joshua Redman - tenor saxophone (#4)

== Production credits ==
- Producer: Nicholas Payton.
- Executive Producer: Richard Seidel
- Recorder, mixed, mastered by James Nichols.
- Production Coordinator: Camille Tominaro
- Production Assistant: Samantha Black
- Mastered at BMG Studios, New York.
- Management: The Management Ark, Princeton, NJ
- Art direction & Design – Giulio Tururro.
- Photographs – Barron Claiborne.
- Recording Session Photographs – Jimmy Katz
- Label: Polygram Records

== Charts ==
Chart (1998)	Peak position
U.S. Billboard Jazz Albums	8
