= Youngblood (Elvin Jones album) =

Studio album by Elvin Jones
- Released: 1992
- Recorded: April 20–21, 1992
- Studios: Van Gelder, Englewood Cliffs, New Jersey
- Genre: Jazz
- Length: 63:54
- Labels: Enja; ENJ 7051-2
- Producer: Matthias Winckelmann

Elvin Jones chronology
In Europe (1991)	Youngblood (1992)	Going Home (1992)

Youngblood is an album by the jazz drummer Elvin Jones, recorded in 1992 and released on the Enja label.

== Production ==
Trumpet player Nicholas Payton was just 19 years old during the recording sessions. The album was engineered by Rudy Van Gelder.

== Critical reception ==
Professional ratings
Review scores
Source	Rating
AllMusic	4.5/5 stars
The Penguin Guide to Jazz Recordings	3.5/4 stars
The Philadelphia Inquirer	3.5/4 stars

The Philadelphia Inquirer, noting Jones's younger players, wrote: "If there were ever an argument for melding the wisdom of age with the impetuousness of youth, this is it." The Gazette praised Joshua Redman, concluding: "In a remarkable solo turn on 'Angel Eyes', he wanders through the history of jazz both ancient and recent—and better yet, sounds quite at home in the present."

The AllMusic review noted the "consistently inspired playing from all of the musicians... An excellent effort".

== Track listing ==
1. "Not Yet" (Javon Jackson) - 3:55
2. "Have You Seen Elveen?" (Nicholas Payton) - 7:43
3. "Angel Eyes" (Earl Brent, Matt Dennis) - 8:47
4. "Ding-A-Ling-A-Ding" (Elvin Jones) - 7:20
5. "Lady Luck" (Jones, Frank Wess) - 9:30
6. "The Biscuit Man" (Donald Brown) - 4:00
7. "Body and Soul" (Edward Heyman, Robert Sour, Frank Eyton, Johnny Green) - 6:15
8. "Strange" (George Mraz) - 4:15
9. "My Romance" (Lorenz Hart, Richard Rodgers) - 6:16
10. "Youngblood" (Jones) - 5:51

== Personnel ==
- Elvin Jones – drums
- Nicholas Payton – trumpet
- Javon Jackson, Joshua Redman – tenor saxophone
- George Mraz – double bass
