= Voodoo (Dirty Dozen Brass Band album) =

Studio album by Dirty Dozen Brass Band
- Released: 1989
- Genres: Brass band, jazz
- Label: Columbia
- Producer: Scott Billington

Dirty Dozen Brass Band chronology
| Live: Mardi Gras in Montreux (1985) | Voodoo (1989) | The New Orleans Album (1990) |

Voodoo is an album by the New Orleans brass band the Dirty Dozen Brass Band, released in 1989. It was the band's Columbia Records debut.

== Production ==
The album was produced by Scott Billington. Dizzy Gillespie, Branford Marsalis, and Dr. John make guest appearances on the album. While Gillespie scats on his contribution, the only vocals on Voodoo are provided by Dr. John and trumpet player Greg Davis.

== Critical reception ==
Professional ratings
Review scores
| Source | Rating |
|---|---|
| AllMusic | 4/5 stars |
| Chicago Tribune | 3.5/4 stars |
| Robert Christgau | B |
| The Cincinnati Enquirer | 4/5 stars |
| The Encyclopedia of Popular Music | 3/5 stars |
| MusicHound Jazz: The Essential Album Guide | 3.5/5 stars |
| The Rolling Stone Album Guide | 3.5/5 stars |

Robert Christgau wrote: "The cameos ... are the giveaways, because this jaunty concept needs those guys, to sing or solo as the case may be. The headliners are the lounge band of a tourist's dreams, and that's all they are." The New York Times wrote that "while the band's arrangements can be dissonant, except for the use of a baritone saxophone and the omission of clarinet its instrumental lineup is quite traditional and includes two trumpets, two saxophones, trombone, sousaphone, and snare and bass drums."

The St. Petersburg Times thought that, "driven by [Kirk] Joseph's sousaphone, the other horn players weave an earthy mosaic of tangled riffs and clipped, edgy solos." USA Today stated that "without a pianist or a bass player, the band alternates in this eight-song set between finger-snapping jazz and Mardi Gras party rhythms."

== Track listing ==
| No. | Title | Length |
|---|---|---|
| 1. | "It's All Over Now" | 5:00 |
| 2. | "Voodoo" | 6:47 |
| 3. | "Oop Pop a Dah" | 3:58 |
| 4. | "Gemini Rising" | 4:11 |
| 5. | "Moose the Mooche" | 3:27 |
| 6. | "Don't Drive Drunk" | 3:21 |
| 7. | "Black Drawers/Blue Piccolo" | 9:21 |
| 8. | "Santa Cruz" | 4:17 |
