= Tribute to John Coltrane "A Love Supreme" =

Live album by Elvin Jones
- Released: 1994
- Recorded: December 3–4, 1992
- Venue: Pit Inn, Tokyo, Japan
- Genre: Jazz
- Length: 63:54
- Label: Columbia; 487899-2
- Producer: Keiko Jones

Elvin Jones chronology
Going Home (1992)	Tribute to John Coltrane "A Love Supreme" (1994)	It Don't Mean a Thing (1993)

Tribute to John Coltrane "A Love Supreme" is a live album by jazz drummer Elvin Jones featuring two of John Coltrane's compositions performed by Jones' "Special Quartet" featuring Wynton Marsalis recorded in 1992 at the Pit Inn in Tokyo, Japan and released on the Columbia label.

== Reception ==
The Allmusic review stated "An essential recording for Jones and Marsalis completists".

Professional ratings
Review scores
Source	Rating
Allmusic	4/5 stars

== Track listing ==
All compositions by John Coltrane except as indicated

1. "A Love Supreme: Part 1: Acknowledgement/Part 2: Persuance/Part 3: Resolution" - 47:16
2. "Dear Lord" - 6:32
3. "Happy Birthday for "Yuka"" (Traditional) - 7:24
4. "Blues to Veen" (Wynton Marsalis) - 15:04

== Personnel ==
- Elvin Jones - drums
- Wynton Marsalis - trumpet
- Marcus Roberts - piano
- Reginald Veal - bass
