= Dirty Dozen Brass Band =

American brass band from New Orleans, Louisiana

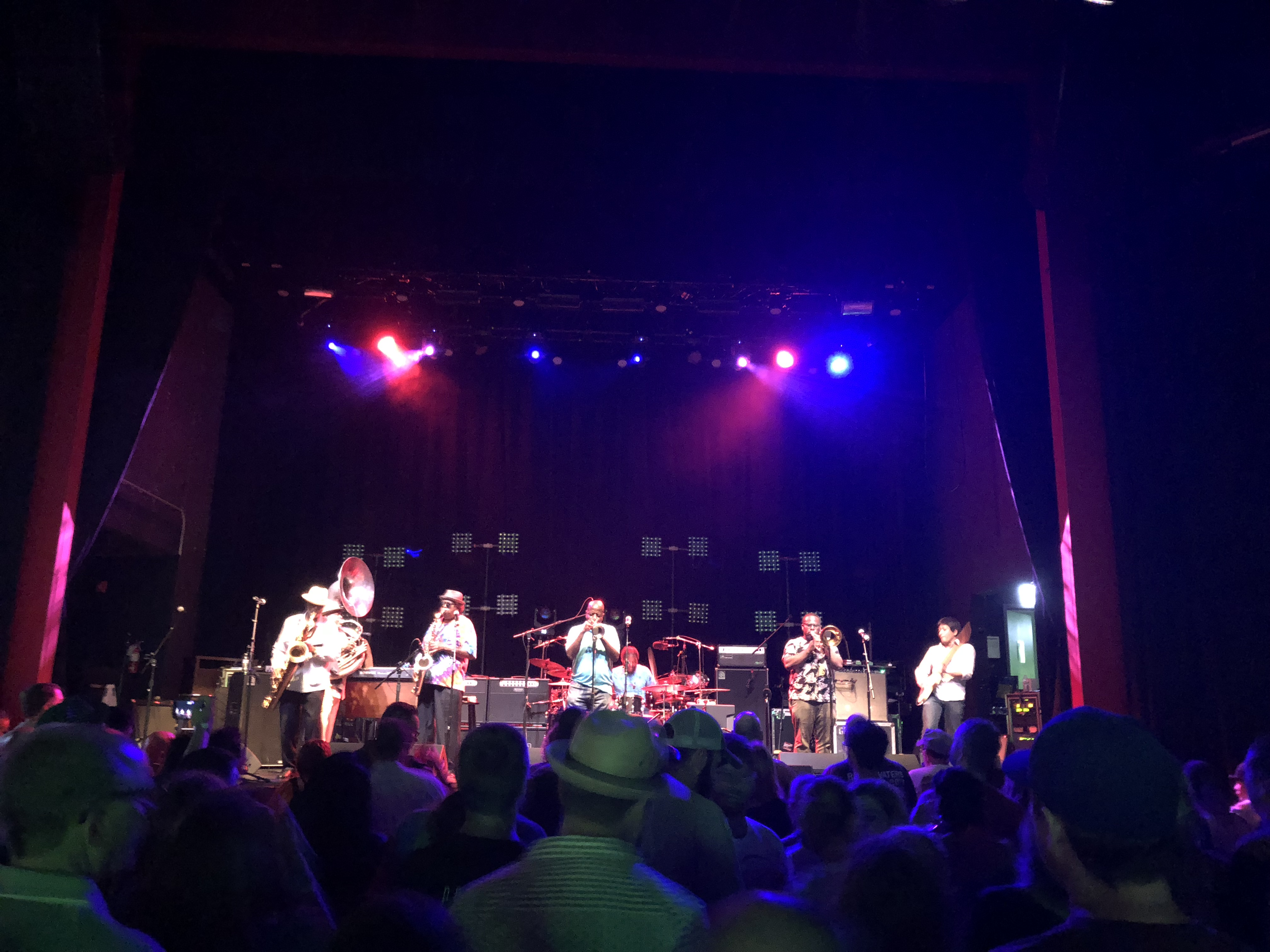
- Dirty Dozen Brass Band in 2018

Background information
- Origin: New Orleans, Louisiana, U.S.
- Genres: Jazz; New Orleans R&B; jazz fusion; second line; funk; soul; jam band
- Years active: 1977–present
- Labels: Concord Jazz; Rounder; Columbia; Mammoth; Ropeadope; Shout! Factory
- Members: Gregory Davis – trumpet, vocals Roger Lewis – baritone, soprano sax, Vocals; Kirk Joseph – Sousaphone; Julian Addison – Drums, Vocals; Takeshi Shimmura – Guitar; Trevarri Huff-Boone - Tenor Sax/Vocals; Stephen Walker - Trombone/Vocals
- Past members: Keith Anderson – Trombone; Revert Andrews – Trombone; Lionel Batiste – Bass drum Big Sam – Trombone; Jake Eckert – Guitar; Kevin Harris – Tenor saxophone Terence Higgins – Drums; Benny Jones – Bass drum Charles Joseph – Trombone; Richard Knox – Keyboard; Jenell Marshall – Snare drum Julius McKee – Sousaphone; Jamie McLean – Guitar; TJ Norris – Trombone; Kyle Roussel – Keyboard; Efrem Towns – Trumpet, flugelhorn Jermal Watson – Drums
- Website: dirtydozenbrass.com

The Dirty Dozen Brass Band is an American brass band based in New Orleans, Louisiana. The ensemble was established in 1977, by Benny Jones and members of the Tornado Brass Band. The Dirty Dozen incorporated funk and bebop into the traditional New Orleans jazz style, and has since been a major influence on local music. In 2023, they won the Grammy Award for Best American Roots Performance.

== Beginnings ==
The Dirty Dozen Brass Band grew out of the youth music program established by Danny Barker at New Orleans' Fairview Baptist Church. In 1972, Barker started the Fairview Baptist Church Marching Band to provide young people with a positive outlet for their energies. The band achieved considerable local popularity and transformed itself into a professional outfit led by trumpet player Leroy Jones and known as the Hurricane Brass Band. By 1976, opportunities for brass bands were drying up; Jones left the group to play mainstream jazz and, after a brief period as the Tornado Brass Band, the group fell apart.

A few of the musicians from the Tornado band—trumpeter Gregory Davis, sousaphone player Kirk Joseph, trombone player Charles Joseph, and saxophone player Kevin Harris–continued to rehearse together into 1977, and they were joined by Efrem Towns (trumpet player/lead singer), Roger Lewis on saxophone and Benny Jones and Jenell Marshall on drums. By this point the popularity of brass band music in New Orleans was at a low ebb, and paying gigs were rare, but the band continued to rehearse and develop a repertoire.

When Benny Jones, who was active in the social and pleasure club scene, was asked to get a band together for a parade, he would draw from this rehearsal group, which had named themselves The Original Sixth Ward Dirty Dozen, a name created to show their strong connection to the Tremé neighborhood and the local social club scene, as represented by the Dirty Dozen Social and Pleasure Club.

The band began playing regular gigs at the Seventh Ward club Daryl's, and at the Glasshouse, a bar in a black neighborhood of Uptown New Orleans. The performances at Daryl's caught the attention of Jerry Brock, co-founder of the radio station WWOZ.

== Popularity ==
In 1980, Brock made the first professional recording of the Dirty Dozen Brass Band, which he played frequently on WWOZ. In 1982, he arranged a concert at Tipitina's, which was the first time they had played at a "white club" in New Orleans.

In 1984, promoter George Wein booked the band on a tour of southern Europe. That was followed by dates in New York—at Tramp's and The Village Gate, and three more trips to Europe, where their original short bookings were extended to six weeks. Concord Jazz released of the band's first album, My Feet Can't Fail Me Now.

In 1986, the band's set at the Montreux Jazz Festival was recorded and released as Mardi Gras at Montreux on Rounder Records. The album and the band's touring successes attracted major-label attention, and in 1987 the band signed a contract with Columbia. Their Columbia debut, 1989's Voodoo featured guest appearances by Dr. John, Dizzy Gillespie, and Branford Marsalis. Later recordings saw them joined by a variety of special guests including Elvis Costello, DJ Logic, Norah Jones, and Danny Barker. The group has also toured and recorded with jam band Widespread Panic, as well as spending almost all of 1995 as the opening act for The Black Crowes 'Amorica Or Bust' US Tour.

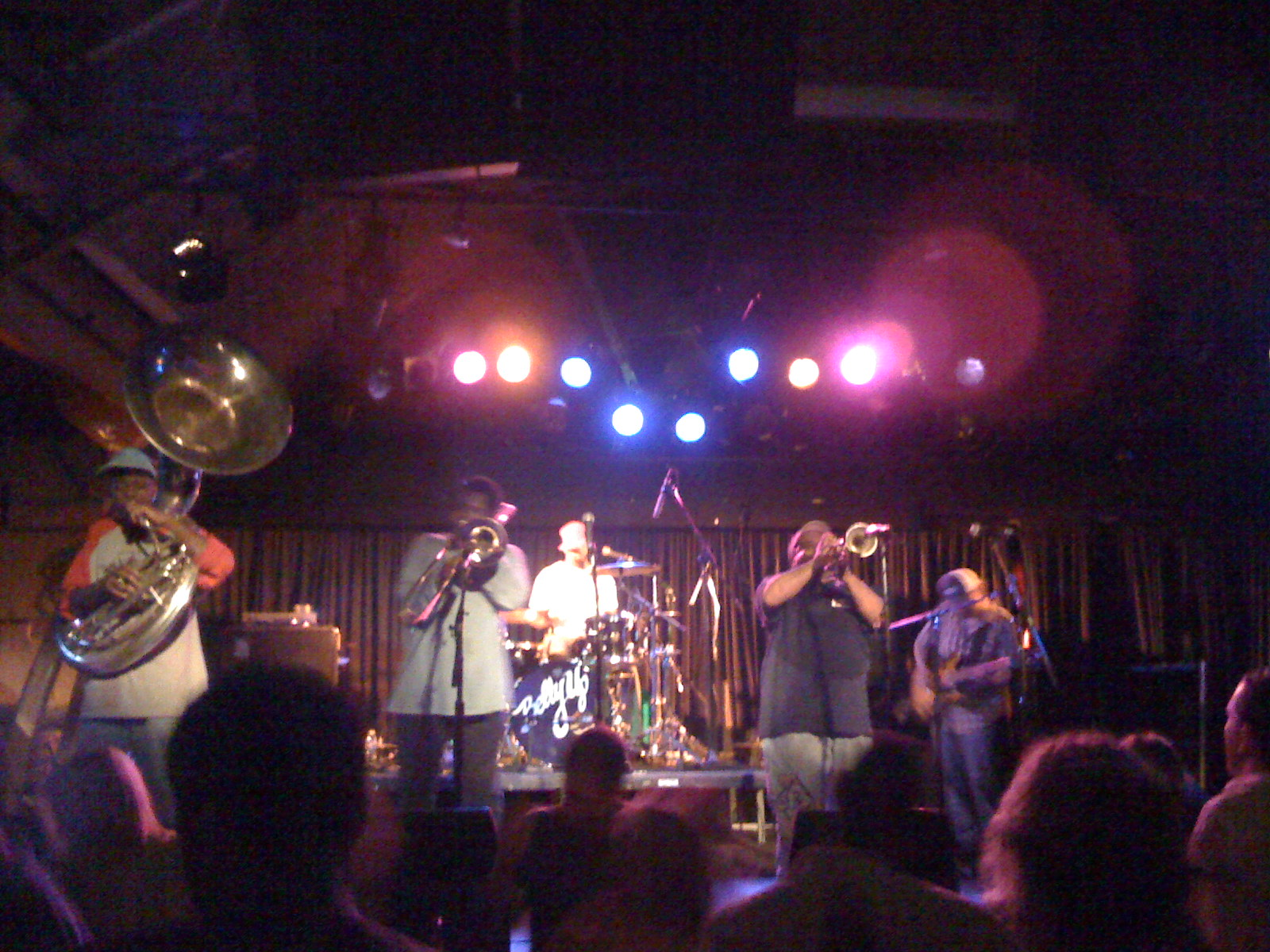
Dirty Dozen Brass Band in 2008

In 1990, at the memorial service for Jim Henson, the band played a Dixieland jazz version of the "When the Saints Go Marching In" at the St. John's Cathedral in New York City. Through letters written prior to his passing, Henson requested that a Dixieland band play a rousing version of "Saints" at the conclusion of the memorial service. The performance was described by Life magazine as "an epic and almost unbearably moving event".

In 1998, the band released Ears to the Wall on Mammoth Records. They followed it up in 1999 with Buck Jump, which was produced by John Medeski of Medeski Martin & Wood. Their next album, 2002's Medicated Magic, appeared on Ropeadope Records, as did their subsequent studio release, Funeral for a Friend, which appeared in 2004. Funeral for a Friend is a documentation of a New Orleans "funeral with music", the original environment of the brass band form. They appeared on the 2005 benefit album A Celebration of New Orleans Music to Benefit MusiCares Hurricane Relief 2005, and on two tracks on Modest Mouse's album Good News for People Who Love Bad News. On August 29, 2006, the Dozen released What's Going On, their version of the 1971 Marvin Gaye album What's Going On as a response to the devastation of Hurricane Katrina that struck New Orleans one year earlier.

The band appears in performance footage, and Gregory Davis is interviewed, in the 2005 documentary Make It Funky!, which presents a history of New Orleans music. In the film, the band performs "My Feet Can't Fail Me Now" with guests Irvin Mayfield and Troy Andrews.

== Influence ==
The band's success inspired a resurgence of New Orleans' brass band music, in the city and nationwide. The band was most influential in the 1980s, when they demonstrated that brass band music could be successful; the Dirty Dozen gave it worldwide visibility.

== Discography ==
- 1984 – My Feet Can't Fail Me Now (Concord Jazz)
- 1986 – Live: Mardi Gras In Montreux (Rounder)
- 1989 – Voodoo (Columbia)
- 1990 – The New Orleans Album (Columbia)
- 1991 – Open Up: Whatcha Gonna Do for the Rest of Your Life (Columbia)
- 1993 – Jelly (Columbia)
- 1996 – Ears to the Wall (Mammoth)
- 1997 – This is Jazz (Columbia)
- 1999 – Buck Jump (Mammoth)
- 2002 – Medicated Magic (Ropeadope Records)
- 2002 – Down and Dirty (Terminus Records)
- 2003 – We Got Robbed: Live in New Orleans (self-released)
- 2004 – Jazz Fest 2004 (Home Grown Distribution)
- 2004 – Funeral for a Friend (Ropeadope)
- 2005 – This Is the Dirty Dozen Brass Band (Shout! Factory)
- 2005 – Jazz Moods: Hot (Columbia)
- 2006 – What's Going On (Shout! Factory)
- 2012 – Twenty Dozen (Savoy Jazz)
- 2018 – Live at JazzFest 2018 (Munck Music)
- 2019 – Live at the 2023 New Orleans Jazz & Heritage Festival 2019 (Munck Music)
- 2022 – Live in New Orleans (501 Record Club)
- 2023 – Live at the 2023 New Orleans Jazz & Heritage Festival (Munck Music)
- 2024 – Live at JazzFest 2024 (Munck Music)

The Dirty Dozen Brass Band appears on:

- 1984 – Rebirth Brass Band: Here To Stay!
- 1986 – Phil Alvin: Un "Sung" Stories (Slash)
- 1987 – Buckwheat Zydeco: On A Night Like This
- 1987 – Toby Mountain: Louisiana Scrapbook
- 1988 – Toby Mountain: Modern New Orleans Masters
- 1989 – New Orleans Brass Bands - Down Yonder
- 1989 – The Neville Brothers: Yellow Moon
- 1989 – Elvis Costello: Spike (Warner)
- 1989 – B. B. King Blues Hour: Cooking With The Blues, Shows 80 & 107
- 1990 – The Neville Brothers & Friends: Live at Storyville Jazz Hall
- 1990 – B. B. King Blues Hour, Shows 116 & 120
- 1990 – Acoustic Christmas
- 1991 – Poi Dog Pondering: Jack Ass Ginger
- 1991 – Elvis Costello: Mighty Like a Rose
- 1991 – The Manhattan Transfer: The Offbeat of Avenues
- 1991 – The Neville Brothers: Tell It Like It Is
- 1992 – Zachary Richard: Snake Bite Love
- 1993 – Buckwheat Zydeco: Menagerie
- 1994 – Phil Alvin: Country Fair 2000
- 1995 – Sonia Dada: A Day At The Beach
- 1995 – The Real Music Box: 25 Years of Rounder Records
- 1995 – Louisiana Spice
- 1995 – The Black Crowes: Three Snakes and One Charm
- 1996 – Elvis Costello: Plugging The Gaps, Vol. 2
- 1996 – Crossroads: Southern Routes—Music of the American South
- 1997 – Elvis Costello: Extreme Honey
- 1997 – Mama Digdown's Brass Junction: Big Boy
- 1998 – The Black Crowes: Sho' Nuff: The Complete Black Crowes
- 1998 – Mardi Gras Time
- 1998 – Louisiana 2: Live from the Mountain Stage
- 1998 – Kickin' Some Brass
- 1999 – The Black Crowes: By Your Side
- 1999 – Widespread Panic: Til the Medicine Takes
- 1999 – Joe Henry: Fuse
- 1999 – Buckwheat Zydeco: The Buckwheat Zydeco Story: A 20-Year Party
- 1999 – The Tigers: Shout & Testify
- 1999 – Zydecco Madness: Ga Ga for Ya-Ya
- 2000 – Widespread Panic: Another Joyous Occasion
- 2000 – Cafe Jazz, Vol 2
- 2000 – Mardi Gras Essentials
- 2000 – Tri-C Jazz Festival 2000
- 2000 – Buckwheat Zydeco: Ultimate Collection
- 2001 – La Thorpe Brass: All Things Move
- 2001 – Forgotten Souls Brass Band: Don't Forget 'Em
- 2002 – Widespread Panic: The Earth Will Swallow You
- 2002 – Bonnaroo: Live from Bonnaroo Music Festival
- 2002 – Mardi Gras in New Orleans
- 2003 – Dave Matthews: Some Devil
- 2003 – Aaron Neville: Believe
- 2003 – Angel Beach, Vol. 3
- 2003 – Boyd Tinsley - True Reflections
- 2003 – Gov't Mule: The Deepest End, Live in Concert
- 2004 – Modest Mouse: Good News for People Who Love Bad News
- 2004 – Widespread Panic: Night of Joy
- 2004 – Widespread Panic: Jackassolantern
- 2004 – Acoustic, Vol. 4
- 2004 – Today's Christmas
- 2004 – Blues Love Song
- 2004 – Dr. John: N'Awlinz: Dis, Dat or D'udda
- 2004 – San Francisco Jazz Festival: Best Of The Fest' 2000-2003
- 2004 – Slang: More Talk About Tonight
- 2004 – Doctors, Professors, Kings and Queens: The Big Ol' Box of New Orleans
- 2005 – Dr. John: The Best Of The Parlophone Years
- 2005 – Make It Funky! The Music That Took Over The World
- 2005 – Our New Orleans: A Benefit Album for the Gulf Coast
- 2005 – Time Life: New Orleans Party Classics
- 2005 – Aaron Neville: Gospel Roots
- 2005 – The Work: Bring Back The Good
- 2005 – A Celebration of New Orleans Music to Benefit MusiCares Hurricane Relief 2005
- 2006 – From the Big Apple to the Big Easy
- 2006 – The Subdudes: Behind the Levee
- 2006 – North Mississippi Allstars: Electric Blue Watermelon
- 2006 – Panama Jack Christmas Collection
- 2007 – Putomayo Presents: New Orleans Brass
- 2007 – Goin' Home: A Tribute to Fats Domino
- 2007 – City of Dreams: A Collection of New Orleans Music
- 2008 – Shout!: Shuffle
- 2008 – The Essential Guide to New Orleans
- 2008 – Stanton Moore: Take It To The Street
- 2009 – Modest Mouse: No One's First and You're Next
- 2009 – Best of Jazz in Burghausen, Vol. 3
- 2010 – Norah Jones: Featuring Norah Jones
- 2011 – Tinariwen – Tassili
- 2011 – Warren Haynes Band – Live From The Asheville Civic Center
- 2013 – New Orleans Funk, Vol. 3: Two-Way-Pocky-Way, Gumbo Ya-Ya & The Mardi Gras Mambo
- 2014 – Dr. John: Ske-Dat-De-Dat: The Spirit of Satch
- 2014 – Dr. John: Dr. John 3-4
- 2016 – Dr. John: The Musical Mojo of Dr. John: Celebrating Mac and His Music
- 2021 – New Orleans Brass Bands: Down Yonder
- 2023 – Birthright: A Black Roots Music Compendium
- 2023 – Johnny King and Friends: Call It Confusion
- 2024 – Elvis Costello: King of America & Other Realms
- 2024 – Terence Blanchard: Music From Tiana's Bayou Adventure

== Awards and honors ==
=== Grammy Awards ===
Year	Category	Work nominated	Result	Ref.
2023	Best American Roots Performance	"Stompin' Ground"	Won	

=== OffBeat's Best of The Beat Awards ===
Year	Category	Work nominated	Result	Ref.
2002	Best Brass Band		Won	
2002	Best Brass Band Album	Medicated Magic	Won	
2004	Best Brass Band		Won	
2004	Best Brass Band Album	Funeral for a Friend	Won	
2006	Best Brass Band Album	What's Going On	Won	
2020	Lifetime Achievement in Music		Won	
