= The Ultimate Dr. John =

Greatest hits album by Dr. John
- Released: 1987
- Genre: Funk
- Label: Warner Special Products

Dr. John chronology
Such a Night! Live in London (1984)	The Ultimate Dr. John (1987)	In a Sentimental Mood (1989)

The Ultimate Dr. John is a compilation album by New Orleans R&B artist Dr. John. Focusing on his early years as a recording artist, it was released in 1987.

== Track listing ==
All tracks composed by Mac Rebennack (Dr. John) except where indicated.

1. "Right Place, Wrong Time" – 2:50
2. "Such a Night" – 2:55
3. "Traveling Mood" (Wee Willie Wayne) – 3:03
4. "What Comes Around (Goes Around)" – 3:10
5. "Me – You = Loneliness" – 3:03
6. "Let's Make a Better World" – 2:54
7. "Iko Iko" (James "Sugar Boy" Crawford) – 4:08
8. "Let the Good Times Roll" (Earl King) – 3:56
9. "Junko Partner" (Traditional; arranged by Wee Willie Wayne) – 4:27
10. "Those Lonely, Lonely Nights" (Earl King, Johnny Vincent) – 2:30
11. "Huey Smith Medley" (a) High Blood Pressure; (b) Don't You Just Know It; (c) Well I'll Be John Brown (Huey "Piano" Smith, Johnny Vincent) – 3:17
12. "Mardi Gras Day" – 8:08
13. "Mama Roux" (Rebennack, Jessie Hill) – 2:55
14. "I Walk on Guilded Splinters" – 7:57
