= Blue Lou (album) =

Studio album by Louis Hayes Sextet
- Released: 1993
- Recorded: April 1993
- Studio: SteepleChase Digital Studio
- Genre: Jazz
- Length: 65:51
- Label: SteepleChase; SCCD 31340
- Producer: Nils Winther

Louis Hayes chronology
Nightfall (1991)	Blue Lou (1993)	The Super Quartet (1994)

Professional ratings
Review scores
Source	Rating
The Penguin Guide to Jazz Recordings	3.5/4 stars

Blue Lou is an album led by drummer Louis Hayes which was recorded in 1993 and released on the Danish SteepleChase label.

== Track listing ==
1. "Blue Lou" (Javon Jackson) – 6:29
2. "Quiet Fire" (George Cables) – 10:15
3. "Honey Dip" (Milton Sealy) – 7:12
4. "Lament for Love" (Ronnie Mathews) – 6:52
5. "The Walk" (Eddie Allen) – 9:56
6. "Sweet and Lovely" (Gus Arnheim, Jules LeMare, Harry Tobias) – 9:36
7. "New Endings" (Philip Harper) – 7:55
8. "Spur of the Moment" (Allen) – 7:15

== Personnel ==
- Louis Hayes – drums
- Eddie Allen – trumpet
- Gerald Hayes – alto saxophone
- Javon Jackson – tenor saxophone
- Ronnie Mathews – piano
- Clint Houston – bass
