= The Super Quartet =

Studio album by Louis Hayes & Company
- Released: 1994
- Recorded: February 1994
- Studio: Murec Studio, Milano, Italy
- Genre: Jazz
- Length: 58:06
- Label: Timeless; SJP 424
- Producer: Peter Huijts

Louis Hayes chronology
| Blue Lou (1993) | The Super Quartet (1994) | Louis at Large (1996) |

The Super Quartet is an album by the drummer Louis Hayes, recorded in Italy in 1994 and released on the Dutch Timeless label.

== Reception ==
Professional ratings
Review scores
| Source | Rating |
|---|---|
| AllMusic | 4.5/5 stars |
| The Penguin Guide to Jazz Recordings | 3/4 stars |

The AllMusic review called it "easily one of Louis Hayes' best recordings as a leader," stating that "this quartet session ... almost has the flavor of a typical Art Blakey & the Jazz Messengers album; although there's no brass, the selections and the hard bop arrangements generally fit".

== Track listing ==
1. "Bolivia" (Cedar Walton) – 6:40
2. "The Song Is You" (Jerome Kern, Oscar Hammerstein II) – 6:12
3. "Up Jumped Spring" (Freddie Hubbard) – 8:17
4. "In Your Own Sweet Way" (Dave Brubeck) – 8:59
5. "Chelsea Bridge" (Billy Strayhorn) – 9:41
6. "Epistrophy" (Thelonious Monk, Kenny Clarke) – 6:53
7. "Blue Lou" (Edgar Sampson, Irving Mills) – 4:56
8. "Fee-Fi-Fo-Fum" (Wayne Shorter) – 6:44

== Personnel ==
- Louis Hayes – drums
- Javon Jackson – tenor saxophone
- Kirk Lightsey – piano
- Essiet Essiet – bass
