= In a Sentimental Mood (Dr. John album) =

Studio album by Dr. John
- Released: May 8, 1989
- Studios: Ocean Way, Los Angeles, California; Power Station, New York City
- Genre: Jazz
- Length: 40:34
- Label: Warner Bros.
- Producer: Tommy LiPuma

Dr. John chronology
The Ultimate Dr. John (1987)	In a Sentimental Mood (1989)	Bluesiana Triangle (1990)

Singles from In a Sentimental Mood
- 1. "Makin' Whoopee!" Released: April 1989

Professional ratings
Review scores
Source	Rating
AllMusic	3/5 stars
Robert Christgau	B+

In a Sentimental Mood is the twelfth album by New Orleans singer and pianist Dr. John. It spent eleven weeks on the Billboard 200 charts, peaking at No. 142 on July 8, 1989.

== Track listing ==
1. "Makin' Whoopee!" (Gus Kahn, Walter Donaldson) (with Rickie Lee Jones) – 4:09
2. "Candy" (Alex Kramer, Joan Whitney, Mack David) – 5:33
3. "Accentuate the Positive" (Johnny Mercer) – 3:55
4. "My Buddy" (Kahn, Donaldson) – 3:50
5. "In a Sentimental Mood" (Duke Ellington, Irving Mills, Manny Kurtz) – 4:05
6. "Black Night" (Jessie Mae Robinson) – 4:12
7. "Don't Let the Sun Catch You Crying" (Joe Greene) – 4:52
8. "Love for Sale" (Cole Porter) – 5:18
9. "More Than You Know" (William Rose, Edward Eliscu, Vincent Youmans) – 4:40

== Personnel ==
Musicians

- Dr. John – vocals, keyboards
- Hugh McCracken – guitar (tracks 2–9)
- Paul Jackson Jr. – acoustic guitar (track 1)
- Abraham Laboriel – bass guitar (tracks 1,3)
- David Barard – bass guitar (tracks 2,8)
- Marcus Miller – bass guitar (tracks 4–7, 9)
- Harvey Mason – drums (tracks 1, 3, 6)
- Herlin Riley – drums (tracks 2, 8)
- Jeff Porcaro – drums (tracks 4–5, 7, 9)
- Lenny Castro, Trazi Williams – percussion (track 8)
- David "Fathead" Newman – saxophone (track 2)
- Joel Peskin – saxophone (track 3)
- Marty Paich – horn and string arrangements (tracks 2, 4–5, 7–9)
- Ralph Burns – horn arrangements (tracks 1, 3, 6)

Technical

- Tommy LiPuma – producer
- Allan Sides – engineer (Ocean Way Studio) (tracks 1, 3–5, 7, 9)
- Elliot Scheiner – engineer (Power Station) (tracks 2, 8)
- Additional Engineer – Roy Hendrickson
- Bart Stevens, Daniel Bosworth, Danny Mormando, Deb Cornish, Mike Ross – assistant engineers
- Doug Sax – mastering
- Janet Levinson – art direction, design
- William Coupon – photography
- Charles Neville – artwork
