= Going Home (Elvin Jones album) =

Studio album by Elvin Jones
- Released: 1993
- Recorded: October 15–16, 1992
- Studio: Van Gelder Studio, Englewood Cliffs, New Jersey
- Genre: Jazz
- Length: 59:48
- Label: Enja; ENJ 7095-2

Elvin Jones chronology
Youngblood (1992)	Going Home (1993)	Tribute to John Coltrane "A Love Supreme" (1992)

Going Home is an album by jazz drummer Elvin Jones recorded in 1992 and released on the Enja label.

== Reception ==
The Allmusic review called the album "A welcome addition to Jones' extensive discography".

Professional ratings
Review scores
Source	Rating
Allmusic	3/5 stars

== Track listing ==
All compositions by Elvin Jones except where noted

1. "The Shell Game" - 12:05
2. "Going Home" - 4:54
3. "Cross Purpose" - 3:37
4. "You've Changed" (Bill Carey, Carl T. Fischer) - 8:38
5. "Truth" (Keiko Jones) - 11:56
6. "East of the Sun" (Brooks Bowman) - 4:03
7. "In 3/4 Thee" (Ravi Coltrane) - 6:39
8. "April 8th" - 7:51

== Personnel ==
- Elvin Jones - drums
- Nicholas Payton - trumpet
- Kent Jordan - flute, piccolo
- Ravi Coltrane - soprano saxophone, tenor saxophone
- Javon Jackson - tenor saxophone
- Willie Pickens - piano
- Brad Jones - bass
