= One for All (Art Blakey album) =

Studio album by Art Blakey and the Jazz Messengers
- Released: 1990
- Recorded: April 10 & 11, 1990; BMG Studios, New York City
- Genre: Jazz
- Length: 67:11
- Label: A&M; A&M 75021 5329-2
- Producer: John Snyder

Art Blakey chronology
Bluesiana Triangle (1990)	One for All (1990)

The Jazz Messengers chronology
Chippin' In (1990)	One for All (1990)

One for All is the final studio album by drummer Art Blakey and the Jazz Messengers, recorded in 1990 and released on the A&M label.

== Reception ==
Professional ratings
Review scores
Source	Rating
AllMusic	2.5/5 stars

The Los Angeles Times called trumpeter Brian Lynch "a splendid writer and soloist."

Scott Yanow of AllMusic stated: "The final recording by Art Blakey's Jazz Messengers found the 70-year old drummer (just months before his death) doing what he loved best, leading a group of young players through hard-swinging and generally new music in the hard-bop style... A satisfying final effort from an irreplaceable drummer and bandleader".

== Track listing ==
1. "Here We Go" (Art Blakey) - 0:28
2. "One for All (And All for One)" (Steve Davis) - 6:40
3. "Theme for Penny" (Javon Jackson) - 6:30
4. "You've Changed" (Bill Carey, Carl Fischer) - 7:13
5. "Accidentally Yours" (Geoffrey Keezer) - 5:10
6. "My Little Brown Book" (Billy Strayhorn) - 2:43
7. "Blame It on My Youth" (Edward Heyman, Oscar Levant) - 1:45
8. "It Could Happen to You" (Jimmy Van Heusen, Johnny Burke) - 3:53
9. "Green is Mean" (Brian Lynch) - 5:25
10. "I'll Wait and Pray" (George Treadwell, Gerald Valentine) - 7:32
11. "Logarythmns" (Blakey) - 2:26
12. "Bunyip" (Dale Barlow) - 6:38
13. "Polka Dots and Moonbeams" (Van Heusen, Burke) - 4:21
14. "Nica's Tempo" (Gigi Gryce) - 6:27

== Personnel ==
- Art Blakey - drums
- Brian Lynch - trumpet
- Steve Davis - trombone
- Dale Barlow, Javon Jackson - tenor saxophone
- Geoff Keezer - piano
- Essiet Okon Essiet - bass
