= Television (Dr. John album) =

Studio album by Dr. John
- Released: 1994
- Genre: Funk rock
- Length: 52:19
- Label: GRP
- Producer: Dr. John

Dr. John chronology
Goin' Back to New Orleans (1992)	Television (1994)	Afterglow (1995)

Television is a studio album by New Orleans R&B artist Dr. John.

== Track listing ==
All tracks composed by Mac Rebennack; except where indicated

1. "Television" – 4:36
2. "Lissen" – 4:29
3. "Limbo" – 4:30
4. "Witchy Red" – 4:16
5. "Shadows" (Mac Rebennack, Doc Pomus) – 4:03
6. "Shut D Fonk Up" (Mac Rebennack, Anthony Kiedis) – 5:10
7. "Thank You (Falletin Me Be Mice Elf Again)" (Sylvester Stewart) – 4:03
8. "Spaceship Relationship" – 4:05
9. "Hold It" – 3:56
10. "Money (That's What I Want)" (Berry Gordy, Janie Bradford) – 3:23
11. "U Lie 2 Much" – 4:30
12. "Same Day Service" – 5:00

== Personnel ==
- Dr. John - vocals, piano, organ, keyboards, Korguitar
- Hugh McCracken - guitar, dobro, bass harmonica, S900 drum
- Georg Wadenius - guitar
- David Barad - bass, background vocals
- Fred Staehle - drums, winger tree
- Errol "Crusher" Bennett - percussion, congas
- Alvin "Red" Tyler - tenor saxophone
- Ronnie Cuber - baritone saxophone, tenor saxophone, horn arrangements
- Charles Miller - trumpet, whistles, horn arrangement ("Shut D Fonk Up")
- Randy Brecker - trumpet
- Birch Johnson - trombone
- David "Fathead" Newman - flute, tenor saxophone solo w/ams ("Lissen"), alto saxophone solo ("Money (That's What I Want)", "U Lie 2 Much")
- Anthony Kiedis - vocals ("Shut D Fonk Up")
- James Genus - bass ("Thank You (Falletin Me Be Mice Elf Again)", "Money (That's What I Want)")
- Sonny Emory - drums ("Thank You (Falletin Me Be Mice Elf Again)", "Money (That's What I Want)")
- Lani Groves, Rachelle Cappelli, Katrice Barnes, Diva Gray, Vaneese Thomas, Curtis King - backing vocals
