= Essiet Essiet =

American jazz bassist

Essiet Okon Essiet (born September 1, 1956) is an American jazz double bassist.

== Early life and education ==
Essiet Essiet was born in Omaha, Nebraska, to Nigerian immigrant parents. His family moved frequently due to his father's work with both the U.S. and Nigerian governments, exposing Essiet to various cultures, languages, and musical traditions from an early age. He began his musical studies on the violin at the age of 10 but switched to the bass at 14 while living in Portland, Oregon. Essiet attended Mount Hood Community College, where he further honed his musical skills. He founded the Intercontinental Bush Orchestra in 1995.

== Biography ==
Essiet's parents were Nigerian immigrants to the United States. Born in Omaha, Nebraska, he studied violin as a child, then learned both bass guitar and stand-up bass as a high schooler in Portland, Oregon. After attending Mount Hood Community College, he played briefly in Los Angeles before working in Europe during the early 1980s with fellow American jazz musician Famoudou Don Moye. In 1983 he moved to New York City, playing with Abdullah Ibrahim, Art Blakey, Marty Cook, and Ralph Peterson Jr.

Essiet Essiet has had many collaborations, including with George Adams, Ron Affif, Kenny Barron, the Blue Note All-Stars, Paul Bollenback, Donald Brown, Bruce Cox, Kurt Elling, Kenny Garrett, Benny Golson, Jim Hartog, David Hazeltine, Freddie Hubbard, Victor Jones, Joe Locke, Kevin Mahogany, Cedar Walton, Bobby Watson, and the group Bluesiana Triangle (with Dr. John and David “Fathead” Newman).

== Discography ==
=== As Leader ===
- Shona (Space Time, 2015)

=== As a member ===
Art Blakey and the Jazz Messengers

- Chippin' In (Timeless, 1990)
- One For All (Timeless, 1990)
- The Art of Jazz Art Blakey and The Jazz Messengers (In + Out, 1995)

Bluesiana Triangle
With Dr. John and David "Fathead" Newman

- Bluesiana Triangle (Windham Hill, 1990)
- Bluesiana II (Windham Hill, 1991)

The Blue Note All Stars collective
With Greg Osby, Tim Hagans, Kevin Hays, Javon Jackson and Bill Stewart

- Blue Spirit (Blue Note, 1996)
- "René van Helsdingen" LP Motivation. 1982

=== As sideman ===
With Donald Brown

- Cartunes (Muse, 1995)
- At This Point in My Life (Space Time, 2001)
- French Kiss (Space Time, 2002)
- Wurd on the Skreet (Space Time, 2002)
- Autumn in New York (Space Time, 2003)
- Fast Forward to the Past (Space Time, 2010)

With George Cables

- Live in Bollate (Musica Jazz 2006)
- My Muse (HighNote, 2012)
- In Good Company (HighNote, 2015)
- The George Cables Songbook (HighNote, 2016)
- I'm All Smiles (HighNote, 2019)

With Abdullah Ibrahim

- Zimbabwe (Enja, 1983)
- South Africa (Enja, 1986)

With Ralph Peterson

- Triangular (Featuring Geri Allen) (Blue Note, 1989)
- Ralph Peterson & The Messenger Legacy: Legacy Alive, Vol. 6 (Onyx, 2019)
- Onward & Upward (Onyx, 2020)

With Bobby Watson

- Bobby Watson and Horizon, Present Tense (Columbia, 1992)
- Bobby Watson Big Band, Taylor Made (Columbia, 1993)
- Bobby Watson and Horizon, Midwest Shuffle (Columbia, 1994)
- Bobby Watson and Horizon, Horizon Reassembled (Palmetto, 2004)

With others

- Valery Ponomarev, Profile (Featuring Joe Henderson) (Reservoir, 1991)
- Louis Hayes, The Super Quartet (Timeless, 1994)
- Joe Locke/David Hazeltine Quartet, Mutual Admiration Society (Sharp Nine, 1999)
- Brian Lynch Quartet, Tribute to the Trumpet Masters (Timeless, 2000)
- Charles Thomas, Live in Europe (Space Time, 2002)
- Charles Sullivan, Conrad Herwig, Gary Smulyan & Steve Slagle, Jam Session Vol. 11 (SteepleChase, 2004)
- Dick Oatts, Jon Gordon, Billy Drewes & Andy LaVerne, Jam Session Vol. 13 (SteepleChase, 2005)
- Vincent Herring, Ends and Means (HighNote, 2006)
- Frank Morgan, Reflections (HighNote, 2006)
- Gino Sitson, Bamisphere (Polyvocal, 2007)
- Geoffrey Keezer, Aurea (ArtistShare, 2008)
- Benny Powell, Nextep (Origin, 2008)
- Azar Lawrence, Mystic Journey (Furthermore, 2010)
- TK Blue, Latin Bird (Motema, 2011)
- Keith Brown, Sweet & Lovely (Space Time, 2011)
- Melton Mustafa, The Traveling Man (self-produced, 2012)
- Azar Lawrence, The Seeker (Sunnyside, 2014)
- Benito Gonzalez, Gerry Gibbs, Passion Reverence Transcendence: Music of McCoy Tyner (Whaling City, 2018)
- Eddie Henderson, Be Cool (Smoke Sessions, 2018)
- "René van Helsdingen" LP Motivation. 1982
