= Bluesiana Triangle =

Studio album by Bluesiana Triangle
- Released: 1990
- Recorded: March 1990
- Studio: Acme, Mamaroneck, NY
- Genre: Jazz
- Label: Windham Hill Jazz
- Producer: Sam Sutherland

Art Blakey chronology
Chippin' In (1990)	Bluesiana Triangle (1990)	One for All (1990)

Dr. John chronology
In a Sentimental Mood (1989)	Bluesiana Triangle (1990)	Bluesiana II (1991)

David "Fathead" Newman chronology
Return to the Wide Open Spaces (1990)	Bluesiana Triangle (1990)	Bluesiana II (1991)

Bluesiana Triangle is an album by American jazz musician Art Blakey, as well as the name of the short-lived American jazz, blues and funk group that recorded it, consisting of Blakey (drums), Dr. John (keyboards, guitar, vocals) and David "Fathead" Newman (saxophone, flute).

After Blakey's death, the group released a second album, featuring drummer Will Calhoun (who replaced Art Blakey), trombonist Ray Anderson, bassists Essiet Okon Essiet and Jay Leonhart (on different tracks), and percussionist Joe Bonadio.

== Reception ==
Professional ratings
Review scores
Source	Rating
AllMusic	4.5/5 stars

Bob Porter of AllMusic states that "The music is an above-average mixture of jazz, blues, and funk".

== Track listing ==
1. "Heads Up" (David "Fathead" Newman) - 5:43
2. "Life's a One Way Ticket" (Cousin Joe) - 5:31
3. "Shoo Fly, Don't Bother Me" (Thomas Brigham Bishop) - 10:06
4. "Need to Be Loved" (Art Blakey, David "Fathead" Newman, Mac Rebennack) - 3:42
5. "Next Time You See Me" (Bill Harvey, Earl Forest) - 4:49
6. "When the Saints Go Marching In" (Traditional) - 6:16
7. "For All We Know" (J. Fred Coots, Sam M. Lewis) - 6:33

== Personnel ==
- Art Blakey - drums, piano (track 7), vocals
- Dr. John - guitar, organ, piano, vocals
- David "Fathead" Newman - flute, saxophone, backing vocals
- Essiet Okon Essiet - bass, backing vocals
- Joe Bonadio - drums (track 7), percussion
