= Bluesiana II =

Studio album by Bluesiana Triangle
- Released: 1991
- Recorded: April 22–25, 1991
- Studio: Acme Studios, Mamaroneck, NY
- Genre: Jazz
- Length: 55:30
- Label: Windham Hill Jazz; 01934 10133-2
- Producer: Dr. John, David Newman

Dr. John chronology
Bluesiana Triangle (1990)	Bluesiana II (1991)	Goin' Back to New Orleans (1992)

David "Fathead" Newman chronology
Bluesiana Triangle (1990)	Bluesiana II (1991)	Mr. Gentle Mr. Cool (1994)

Bluesiana II is an album by American jazz ensemble Bluesiana Triangle, led by pianist/vocalist Dr. John and saxophonist David "Fathead" Newman, recorded in 1991 and released on the Windham Hill label.

== Reception ==
Professional ratings
Review scores
Source	Rating
AllMusic	3/5 stars

In his review for AllMusic, William Ruhlmann states "in the spring of 1991, Dr. John and Newman organized this second Bluesiana session ... The resulting music again justifies the name, blues played in a funky Louisiana style with plenty of room for extended jazzy soloing. Though much of the material was written by Dr. John and he does sing occasionally, this is not a conventional Dr. John vocal album. It does contain some excellent playing, however."

== Track listing ==
All compositions by Mac Rebennack except where noted

1. "Fonkalishus" (Ray Anderson, David "Fathead" Newman, Mac Rebennack) – 5:55
2. "Doctor Blooze" – 3:33
3. "Cowan Woman" – 6:47
4. "For Art's Sake" (Anderson, Rebennack) – 8:10
5. "Skoshuss" – 5:16
6. "Love's Parody" (Will Calhoun) – 3:26
7. "Santa Rosalia" – 5:29
8. "San Antone" (Traditional) – 4:28
9. "Montana Banana" (David "Fathead" Newman) – 5:33
10. "Tribute to Art" (Calhoun) – 6:53

== Personnel ==
- Dr. John – piano, guitar, vocals
- David Newman – tenor saxophone, alto saxophone, flute
- Ray Anderson – trombone
- Will Calhoun – drums
- Essiet Okon Essiet (tracks 6–9), Jay Leonhart (tracks 1–5) – bass
- Joe Bonadio – percussion
