= Goin' Back to New Orleans =

Studio album by Dr. John
- Released: June 12, 1992
- Genres: Rock, blues, R&B
- Length: 66:17
- Label: Warner Bros.
- Producer: Stewart Levine

Dr. John chronology
Bluesiana II (1991)	Goin' Back to New Orleans (1992)	Television (1994)

Professional ratings
Review scores
Source	Rating
AllMusic	3/5 stars
Chicago Tribune	3/4 stars
Rolling Stone	4/5 stars

Goin' Back to New Orleans is an album by the New Orleans singer and pianist Dr. John. It was released by Warner Bros. Records on June 12, 1992. The album won a Grammy Award for Best Traditional Blues Album.

Musicians and vocalists on the album include the Neville Brothers, Al Hirt, Danny Barker, Alfred "Uganda" Roberts, Pete Fountain, Alvin "Red" Tyler, Chuck Carbo, Clyde Kerr, Jr., Kirk Joseph, and Jamil Sharif.

== Background ==
This was the first Dr. John album to be recorded in his hometown of New Orleans. The recording sessions took place at Ultrasonic Studios, with the Neville Brothers providing vocals on four tracks. Numerous other musicians from New Orleans also participated in the album.

In the album's liner notes, Dr. John described the record as "in a way, a little history of New Orleans music from the 1850s through the 1950s and beyond."

== Track listing ==
1. "Litanie des Saints" (Mac Rebennack) - 4:44
2. "Careless Love" (Martha Koenig, Spencer Williams, W. C. Handy) - 4:10
3. "My Indian Red" - 4:47
4. "Milneburg Joys" (Charles Melrose, Jellyroll Morton, Leon Roppola, Paul Mayers) - 2:39
5. "I Thought I Heard Buddy Bolden Say" (Ferdinand Morton) - 2:29
6. "Basin Street Blues" (Spencer Williams) - 4:27
7. "Didn't He Ramble" (Hattie Bolten) - 3:28
8. "Do You Call That a Buddy?" (Don Raye, Wesley Wilson) - 3:54
9. "How Come My Dog Don't Bark (When You Come Around)" (Prince Partridge) - 4:09
10. "Goodnight Irene" (Huddie Ledbetter, John Lomax) - 4:11
11. "Fess Up" (Mac Rebennack) - 3:12
12. "Since I Fell for You" (Buddy Johnson) - 3:32
13. "I'll Be Glad When You're Dead, You Rascal You" (Sam Theard) - 3:25
14. "Cabbage Head" (Henry Roeland Byrd, Mac Rebennack) - 3:59
15. "Goin' Home Tomorrow" (Alvin Young, Fats Domino) - 3:01
16. "Blue Monday" (Dave Bartholomew) - 3:01
17. "Scald Dog Medley/I Can't Go On" (Huey "Piano" Smith/Dave Bartholomew, Fats Domino) - 2:58
18. "Goin' Back to New Orleans" (Joe Liggins) - 4:08
