= Feel the Wind =

Studio album by Freddie Hubbard & Art Blakey
- Released: 1989
- Recorded: October 31 & November 1, 1988
- Studio: Studio 44, Monster, Holland
- Genre: Jazz
- Length: 53:08
- Label: Timeless
- Producer: Makoto Kimata

Freddie Hubbard chronology
Stardust (1987)	Feel the Wind (1989)	Minor Mishap (1989)

Art Blakey chronology
Not Yet (1988)	Feel the Wind (1988)	I Get a Kick Out of Bu (1988)

Professional ratings
Review scores
Source	Rating
Allmusic	3/5 stars

Feel the Wind is an album by trumpeter Freddie Hubbard and drummer Art Blakey recorded in November 1988 and released on the Timeless label. It features performances by Hubbard, Blakey, Benny Green, Mulgrew Miller, Leon Lee Dorsey, Lonnie Plaxico and Javon Jackson. The album was also released in Japan as 70 Years Anniversary: Special Edition Vol. 1.

== Reception ==
Ken Dryden of Allmusic stated "One of Art Blakey's final recordings as a leader features two separate pianists (Benny Green and Mulgrew Miller) and two bassists (Leon Lee Dorsey and Lonnie Plaxico) taking part, along with the guest appearance of former Jazz Messenger Freddie Hubbard. Blakey was going deaf near the end of his life and sounds a tad tentative at times, while Hubbard's return may have been more to improve his chops (which had been in question after his experiments with fusion). The trumpeter seems rejuvenated by working with his former boss and his latest crop of Young Lions, who also include tenor saxophonist Javon Jackson. Hubbard brought along a new composition, the funky "Feel the Wind," along with two older works, the snappy "Arietis" (misspelled "Arieties" by the label) and his well-known waltz "Up Jumped Spring"; he is in fine form throughout the session."

== Track listing ==
All compositions by Freddie Hubbard except where noted

1. "Arietis" - 5:26
2. "Feel the Wind" - 9:53
3. "Embraceable You" (George Gershwin, Ira Gershwin) - 9:17
4. "Off Minor" (Thelonious Monk) - 6:17
5. "Up Jumped Spring" - 5:13
6. "Piano Trio Medley: (arranged Miller) - 12:22
7. "Big Foot" (Charlie Parker) - 4:40

== Personnel ==
- Freddie Hubbard: trumpet, flugelhorn
- Art Blakey: drums
- Javon Jackson: tenor saxophone
- Mulgrew Miller: piano
- Benny Green: piano
- Ray Drummond: bass
- Leon Lee Dorsey: bass
