= Summit Meeting (Eric Alexander album) =

Studio album by Eric Alexander
- Released: June 18, 2002
- Recorded: December 19–20, 2001
- Studio: The Studio, New York, NY
- Genre: Jazz
- Length: 67:13
- Label: Milestone
- Producer: Todd Barkan

Eric Alexander chronology
The Second Milestone (2001)	Summit Meeting (2002)	Nightlife in Tokyo (2003)

Summit Meeting is an album by tenor saxophonist Eric Alexander. It was recorded in 2001 and released by Milestone Records.

== Recording and music ==
The album was recorded on December 19–20, 2001. It was produced by Todd Barkan. Five of the tracks are played by the quartet of tenor saxophonist Eric Alexander, pianist Harold Mabern, bassist John Webber, and drummer Joe Farnsworth; for the other tracks, Nicholas Payton is added on trumpet and flugelhorn.

== Release and reception ==
Professional ratings
Review scores
Source	Rating
AllMusic	3/5 stars
The Penguin Guide to Jazz	3.5/4 stars

Summit Meeting was released by Milestone Records. The Penguin Guide to Jazz commented that, "Mabern sounds like he's enjoying every second of the date and gets both horns to give of their best."

== Track listing ==
All compositions by Eric Alexander except where noted

1. "Summit Meeting" – 8:04
2. "The Sweetest Sounds" (Richard Rodgers) – 7:44
3. "There but for the Grace of..." (Harold Mabern) – 8:51
4. "I Haven't Got Anything Better to Do" (Lee Pockriss, Paul Vance) – 7:13
5. "A House Is Not a Home" (Burt Bacharach, Hal David) – 7:59
6. "This Girl's in Love with You" (Bacharach, David) – 6:39
7. "Something's Gotta Give" (Johnny Mercer) – 5:32
8. "Andre's Turn" – 7:12
9. "After the Rain" (John Coltrane) – 7:44

== Personnel ==
- Eric Alexander – tenor saxophone
- Nicholas Payton – trumpet (tracks 1, 3, 5, 8)
- Harold Mabern – piano
- John Webber – bass
- Joe Farnsworth – drums
