= I Get a Kick Out of Bu =

Studio album by Art Blakey and the Jazz Messengers
- Released: 1988
- Recorded: November 11, 1988
- Studio: Barigozzi Studio, Milano, Italy
- Genre: Jazz
- Length: 56:28
- Label: Soul Note; SN 1155
- Producer: Giovanni Bonandrini

Art Blakey chronology
Feel the Wind (1988)	I Get a Kick Out of Bu (1988)	The Art of Jazz: Live in Leverkusen (1989)

I Get a Kick Out of Bu is an album by drummer Art Blakey and the Jazz Messengers recorded in Italy in 1988 and released on the Soul Note label.

== Reception ==
Professional ratings
Review scores
Source	Rating
Allmusic	2.5/5 stars

Scott Yanow of Allmusic stated "Even after heading the Jazz Messengers for over three decades, drummer Art Blakey kept true to his original vision, using the band as a forum for talented young players to swing hard and grow rapidly".

== Track listing ==
1. "Yang" (Philip Harper) - 7:47
2. "Good Morning Heartache" (Ervin Drake, Dan Fisher, Irene Higginbotham) - 7:47
3. "Mayreh" (Horace Silver) - 5:53
4. "Remember When" (Robin Eubanks) - 6:49
5. "Love Walked In" (George Gershwin, Ira Gershwin) - 4:46
6. "Lover Man" (Jimmy Davis, Ram Ramirez, Jimmy Sherman) - 8:23
7. "Drum Solo No. 7" (Art Blakey) - 9:12
8. "I Get a Kick Out of You" (Cole Porter) - 6:18

== Personnel ==
- Art Blakey - drums
- Philip Harper - trumpet (tracks 1, 3–5 & 8)
- Robin Eubanks - trombone (tracks 1, 3–6 & 8)
- Javon Jackson - tenor saxophone (tracks 1–5 & 8)
- Benny Green - piano (tracks 1–6 & 8)
- Leon Dorsey - bass (tracks 1–6 & 8)
