= Kevin Mahogany =

American jazz vocalist

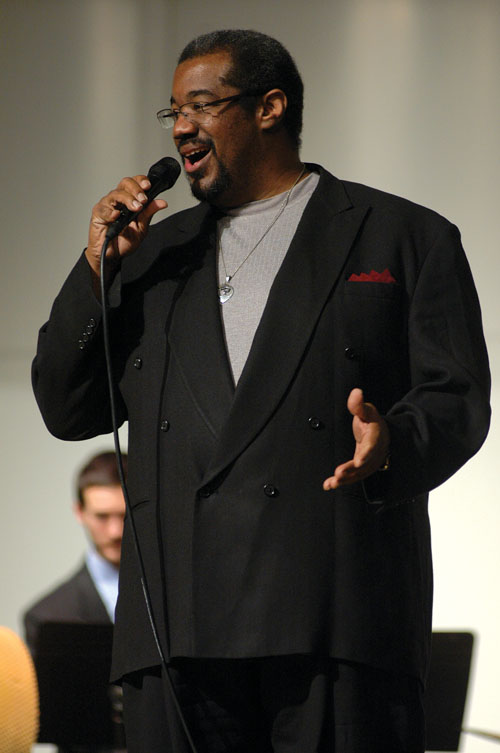
- Mahogany at the University of Wisconsin–Eau Claire Jazz Festival, 2007

Background information
- Born: Kevin Bryant Mahogany; July 30, 1958; Kansas City, Missouri, U.S.
- Died: December 17, 2017 (aged 59) Kansas City, Missouri, U.S.
- Genres: Jazz
- Occupation: Vocalist
- Website: kevinmahogany.com

Kevin Bryant Mahogany (July 30, 1958 – December 17, 2017) was an American jazz vocalist who became prominent in the 1990s. Particularly known for his scat singing, his singing style has been compared with those of Billy Eckstine, Joe Williams and Johnny Hartman.

== Early years ==
Mahogany began his study of music as a child with piano and later learned to play the clarinet and baritone saxophone, performing with jazz bands and teaching music while still in high school. He said, "When I was a kid, music was just as important as English and math in our household... Piano lessons were a grade school staple for the whole family." He attended Baker University, where he performed with instrumental and vocal ensembles and formed a vocal jazz group. In 1981, he received his BFA in music and English drama.

== Performing ==
After graduating, Mahogany returned to Kansas City, where he attracted a local following in the 1980s performing with his groups "The Apollos" and "Mahogany". In 1995 he was featured on a CD by Frank Mantooth.

Mahogany's first CD as a solo artist was Double Rainbow (1993). It was followed by the album Kevin Mahogany (1996), which gained positive attention in the media, and prompted Newsweek to call Mahogany "the standout jazz vocalist of his generation."

Mahogany appeared in Robert Altman's film Kansas City (1996), playing a character said to be based on Kansas City singer Big Joe Turner.

In 1997, Mahogany was featured on the soundtrack to Midnight in the Garden of Good and Evil singing "Laura", written by Johnny Mercer.

He has listed his vocal influences as Lambert, Hendricks and Ross, Al Jarreau and Eddie Jefferson. He has taught at the Berklee College of Music in Boston and the University of Miami.

In 2016, he was featured on the track "Special Girl" on the CD Bang & Classic by Polish rapper Bosski Roman.

== Death ==
Mahogany died on December 17, 2017, from the effects of diabetes. He was 59.

== Discography ==
=== As leader ===
- Double Rainbow (Enja, 1993)
- Songs and Moments (Enja, 1994)
- You Got What It Takes (Enja, 1995)
- Kevin Mahogany (Warner Bros., 1996)
- Another Time Another Place (Warner Bros., 1997)
- My Romance (Warner Bros., 1998)
- Pussy Cat Dues: The Music of Charles Mingus (Enja, 2000)
- Pride & Joy (Telarc, 2002)
- To: Johnny Hartman - Live at Birdland (Mahogany Jazz, 2004)
- Big Band (Zebra, 2005)
- Next Time You See Me (Mahogany Jazz, 2012)
- Old, New, Borrowed and The Blues (Mahogany Jazz, 2013)
- The Vienna Affair (Cracked AnEgg, 2015)
- Just You and Me (Racing Jazz, 2017)
- Live in Torino - Italy (Racing Jazz, 2021)
- An Evening of Ballads (Live) (Mahogany Jazz, 2024)

=== As sideman ===
- Monty Alexander, My America (Telarc, 2002)
- Cheryl Bentyne, Moonlight Serenade (King [jp], 2003)
- Ray Brown, Some of My Best Friends Are...Singers (Telarc, 1998)
- Elvin Jones, It Don't Mean a Thing (Enja, 1993)
- Tony Lakatos, The Coltrane Hartman Fantasy Vol. 1 (Skip, 2010)
- Frank Mantooth, Sophisticated Lady (Sea Breeze, 1995)
- T. S. Monk, Monk on Monk (N2K Encoded, 1991)
- Marlena Shaw, Dangerous (Concord Jazz, 1996)
- Roseanna Vitro, Passion Dance (Telarc, 1996)
- Deborah Brown Quartet, Kansas City Here I Come (Agora SA, 2016)
