= Javon Jackson =

American jazz musician (born 1965)

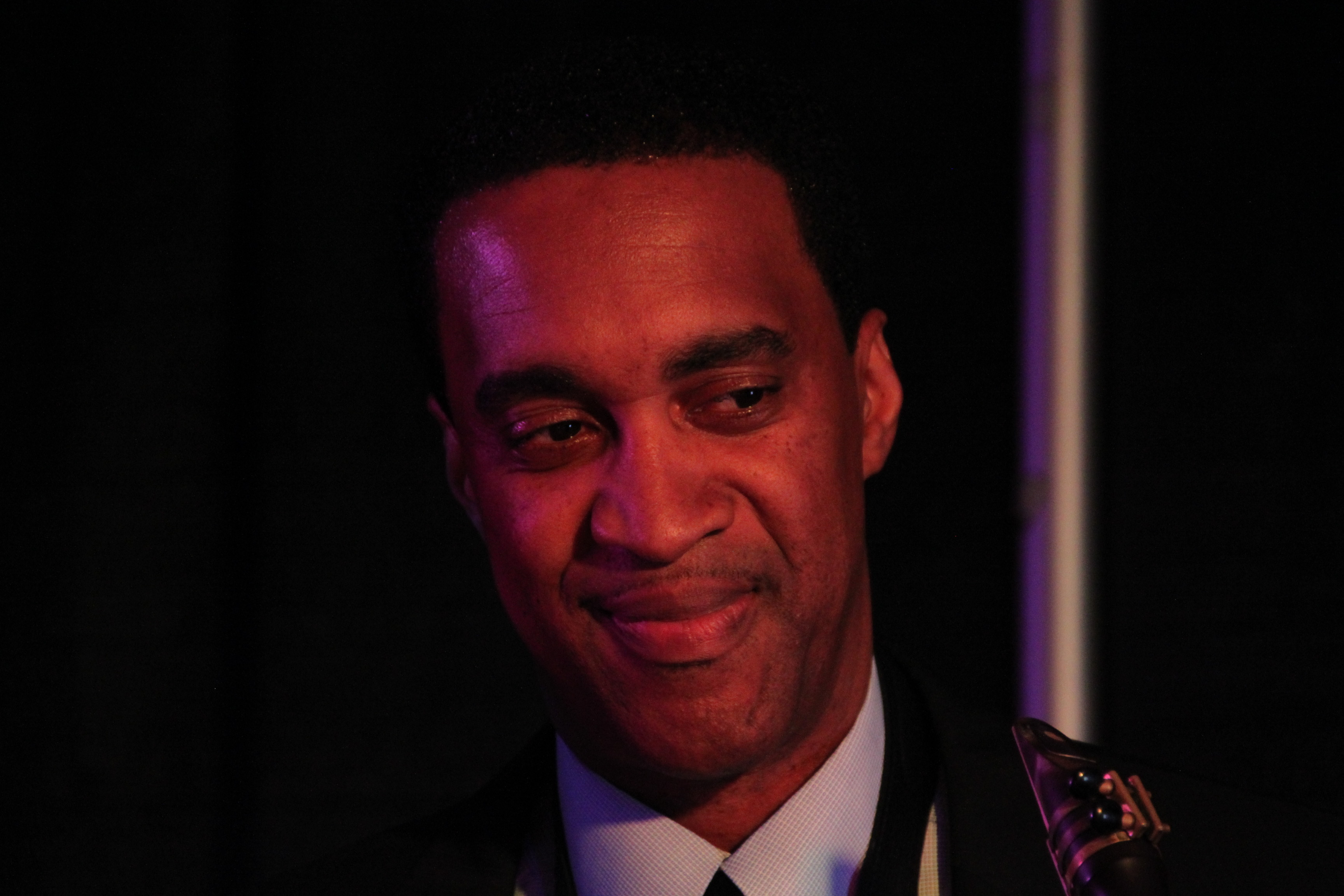
- Jackson at Norfolk VA performance in 2016.

Background information
- Born: Javon Anthony Jackson; June 16, 1965 (age 61); Carthage, Missouri, U.S.
- Genres: Jazz, soul
- Occupation: Musician
- Instrument: Saxophone
- Labels: Criss Cross, Blue Note, Palmetto, Smoke Sessions, Solid Jackson
- Website: www.javonjackson.com

Javon Anthony Jackson (born June 16, 1965) is an American jazz tenor saxophonist, bandleader, and educator. He first became known as a member of Art Blakey's Jazz Messengers from 1987 until Blakey's death in 1990, and has gone on to release 22 recordings as a bandleader and tour and record on over 150 CDs with jazz greats including Elvin Jones, Freddie Hubbard, Charlie Haden, Betty Carter, Cedar Walton, Ron Carter, Dr. Lonnie Smith, Stanley Turrentine and Ben E. King.

In his solo career, his music has been a mix of tradition and neo-jazz, mixing hard bop with soul and funk influences. Recognized for those diverse styles, he was tapped by producers Lea Reis, Bryant "Moe Doe" Johnson to play on Tupac Shakur's Keep Ya Head Up / Madukey Remix in 1993.

In 1992, Javon played saxophonist Illinois Jacquet in Spike Lee's Malcolm X. He is featured in the film playing the Lionel Hampton/Benny Goodman standard, "Flying Home".

He became chair of the University of Hartford's Jackie McLean Institute of Jazz in 2013. In 2019, Newport Festivals Foundation expanded the reach of its popular Newport Jazz Assembly program with the introduction of the Jackie McLean Jazz Studies Jazz Assembly, under Jackson's direction. Jackson also serves as Artistic Director of Jazz in the Valley, an annual music festival in the historic Hudson Valley, now in its 20th year.

In a 2006 Toledo Blade feature, Jackson conveyed his motivation for teaching the younger generation of musicians: “[Jackson] said he enjoys teaching because he is able to connect the young students to some of the legends with whom he has played, including Blakey, Freddie Hubbard, and drummer Elvin Jones. ‘We can share our information to those coming behind us and ensure that things will continue on in a certain fashion,’ Jackson said.

== Early life ==
Jackson was born on June 16, 1965, in Carthage, Missouri, and brought up in Denver. Growing up, his parents both were fans of jazz, exposing him to the music of Ahmad Jamal, Sonny Stitt, Dexter Gordon, and Charlie Parker. Javon first wanted to play drums but his father thought those were too loud. After trying out the trumpet Jackson finally selected the alto saxophone at age 10. At the age of 16, he changed to tenor saxophone and in his teens, he was taught by pianist Billy Wallace. He was briefly enrolled at the University of Denver, before spending part of 1985–86 at the Berklee College of Music, which he abandoned to join drummer Art Blakey's band in which he played alongside pianist Benny Green, trumpeter Philip Harper, trombonist Robin Eubanks, and bassist Peter Washington. Jackson was the Jazz Messenger saxophonist until Blakey's death in 1990.

== Education ==
University of Denver, Denver, CO 1983 (Attended)
Berklee College of Music, Boston, MA Bachelor in Music Degree 1999
State University of New York at Purchase, Purchase, NY Master of Music Degree 2003

== Teaching ==
Jackson has served as Assistant Professor of Jazz at Long Island University in New York (1996–1998) and at the Conservatory of Music at Purchase College in Purchase, NY (1999–2007). Professor Jackson has been Director of the Jackie McLean Institute of Jazz at the University of Hartford since 2013. He serves as Chair of Jazz for the National YoungArts Foundation and is also a member of JEN (Jazz Education Network), where he assists as JENerations Jazz Festival's Artist and Clinician Coordinator.

== Commissions ==
2009, Full-length score for Alfred Hitchcock's silent film, The Lodger, Syracuse International Film Festival. Conducted Silent Film and Cool Jazz premiere screening, Syracuse International Film Festival, October 15, 2010.

== Awards ==
2012 Benny Golson Award, Howard University, Washington, DC, for recognition of legendary excellence in jazz.

== Recordings ==
In 1991, Javon Jackson made his recording debut on Criss Cross Jazz with Me and Mr. Jones, featuring James Williams, Christian McBride and master drummer Elvin Jones. The following year, he joined Jones’ group, appearing on the drummer’s albums Youngblood and Going Home. Jackson made his Blue Note Records debut in 1993 with When The Time Is Right, produced by the renowned vocalist and bandleader Betty Carter. He recorded five more recordings for the Blue Note Record label through the ‘90s, including a diverse range of music by Caetano Veloso, Frank Zappa, Santana, Muddy Waters, and Al Green. Jackson also released four recordings for Palmetto Records, where he explored funk, jazz, and soul with organist Dr. Lonnie Smith, guitarists Mark Whitfield and David Gilmore, trombonist Fred Wesley and drummer Lenny White, among others. He also released three recordings for Chesky Records, including Three’s Company, featuring bandmates bassist Ron Carter and drummer Billy Drummond. Javon introduced his own label, Solid Jackson Records, in 2012, releasing Celebrating John Coltrane first, featuring former Coltrane collaborator and drummer Jimmy Cobb. Also that year, he released Lucky 13, this album focused on the style of soul-jazz keyboardist Les McCann. The recording included McCann’s 1969 hit, "Compared to What," as well as Stevie Wonder’s "Don’t You Worry ‘Bout A Thing". Marking his 20th album as a leader and the third on his label, For You was released in 2018. The album spent five weeks in the top 10 on the jazz charts, climbing to No. 2.

According to a 2019 JazzTimes review of For You: "With tradition always in mind but keeping the settings varied, Jackson salutes mentors, inspirations, and family, among others. His love of Sonny Rollins is clear as day on “I’m Old Fashioned,” he mines Wayne Shorter’s shuffling “Backstage Sally” for all its worth, and he puts the album to rest with some gusty statements on the McCoy Tyner-inspired “88 Strong.” His ray-of-sunshine demeanor also proves to be a key component of the production, lighting up Cedar Walton’s “Simple Pleasure” and bassist David Williams’ tropically infused “Native Son.” When not dealing with searing heat or pure light, Jackson can be found wearing his heart on his horn. He lends true grace to “Lelia,” a ballad dedicated to a cousin who was taken too soon by cancer."

In 2017, for the album Deja Vu (released in 2020), Jackson reunited his lineup from For You: pianist Jeremy Manasia, drummer McClenty Hunter and bassist David Williams for a program of classics “Autumn in New York,” “Limehouse Blues” and “My Shining Hour,” and tunes by Wayne Shorter (“Venus De Mildew”), Cedar Walton (“In The Kitchen,” “Martha’s Prize”), Thelonious Monk (“Raise Four”) and Jimmy Heath. Jackson’s only original on the disc is, “T.J.”, a dedication to his father. Downbeat noted that the performances on Deja Vu demonstrate: “both Jackson’s canonical knowledge and interpretive command .”

For his Solid Jackson label, Jackson released his collaboration with the famed poet Nikki Giovanni, The Gospel According To Nikki Giovanni, in 2022. The track listing is the poet reimagining gospel hymns and spirituals set to jazz. The album marks the first recording of the poet singing with the track of Nina Simone's “Night Song,” a composition Simone first recorded in 1964. Giovanni is one of Oprah Winfrey’s 25 “Living Legends” and a Maya Angelou Lifetime Achievement Award winner in 2017. From her editing of the journal Conversation and the subsequent publication of her early works—1968’s book of poetry Black Feeling, Black Talk/Black Judgment and 1970’s Re:Creation —Giovanni became recognized as a foundational member of the Black Arts movement. As Jackson noted on Heart and Soul’s website, the album was recorded live at Telefunken Studios in South Windsor, Connecticut, the 10 tunes on The Gospel According to Nikki Giovanni were all done without the use of headphones, as he noted: “I really wanted to do it just like if you’re in church, where there’s a preacher talking and all of a sudden the choir begins.”

Jackson's first soundtrack and score, With Peter Bradley was released on the Palmetto Records label in early 2023. The documentary on color field artist and sculptor Peter Bradley was created by filmmaker Alex Rappoport, executive produced by Adger Cowans, and Robina Riccitiello with Diane Koyler and Beth Levison as consulting producers. Jackson recorded the score with a quintet of Jackson on tenor saxophone, Greg Glassman on trumpet, Jeremy Manasia on piano. David Williams on bass and Charles Goold on drums. With Peter Bradley was premiered at the 2023 Slamdance Film Festival, and was an official selection screened at Atlanta Docufest, Florida Film Festival, African Film Festival New York, the Freep Festival of the Detroit Free Press.

== Discography ==
=== As leader/co-leader ===
- Me and Mister Jones (Criss Cross, 1991)
- Burnin′ with Billy Pierce (Criss Cross, 1991)
- New York Unit (Paddle Wheel, 1992)
- When the Time Is Right (Blue Note, 1994) - recorded in 1993
- For One Who Knows (Blue Note, 1995)
- A Look Within (Blue Note, 1996)
- Good People (Blue Note, 1997)
- Pleasant Valley (Blue Note, 1999)
- Easy Does It (Palmetto, 2002)
- Have You Heard (Palmetto, 2004)
- Now (Palmetto, 2006)
- New York Time with Cedar Walton, Christian McBride, Jimmy Cobb (Chesky, 2006)
- Sugar Hill: The Music of Duke Ellington (Chesky, 2007)
- Once upon a Melody (Palmetto, 2008)
- Celebrating John Coltrane (Solid Jackson, 2012)
- Lucky 13 (Solid Jackson, 2012)
- Expression (Smoke Sessions, 2014)
- Three's Company with Ron Carter and Billy Drummond (Chesky, 2016)
- For You (Solid Jackson, 2018)
- Deja Vu (Solid Jackson, 2020)
- The Gospel According To Nikki Giovanni (Solid Jackson, 2022)
- With Peter Bradley, Original Soundtrack (Palmetto, 2023)

=== As a member ===
The Blue Note All Stars collective
With Greg Osby, Tim Hagans, Kevin Hays, Essiet Essiet and Bill Stewart

- Blue Spirit (Blue Note, 1996)

=== As sideman ===
With Art Blakey

- Hard Champion (Paddle Wheel, 1987)
- Blue Moon (Jazz Zounds, 1987)
- Not Yet (Soul Note, 1988)
- Standards (Paddle Wheel, 1988)
- I Get a Kick Out of Bu (Soul Note, 1988)
- The Art of Jazz (In & Out, 1989)
- Chippin' In (Timeless, 1990)
- One for All (A&M, 1990)

With Ron Carter

- Mr. Bow-tie (Somethin' Else, 1995)
- Jazz & Bossa (Blue Note, 2008)

With Louis Hayes

- Blue Lou (SteepleChase, 1993)
- The Super Quartet (Timeless, 1994)
- Louis at Large (Sharp Nine, 1996)

With Freddie Hubbard

- Feel the Wind (Timeless, 1988) also with Art Blakey
- Live at Fat Tuesday's (MusicMasters, 1992)
- MMTC: Monk, Miles, Trane & Cannon (MusicMasters, 1995)

With Elvin Jones

- Youngblood (Enja, 1992)
- Going Home (Enja, 1993)

With others

- Curtis Fuller, Keep It Simple (Savant, 2005)
- Charlie Haden, Live In Montreal (Image Entertainment, 2002)[DVD-Video]
- John Hicks, Sweet Love of Mine (HighNote, 2006)
- Ben E. King, Heart & Soul (CanAm, 2010)
- New York Unit, Tribute to George Adams (Paddle Wheel, 1993)
- Lenny White, Renderers of Spirit (Silva Screen, 1996)
