= Kirk Joseph =

American sousaphone player & tubist (born 1961)

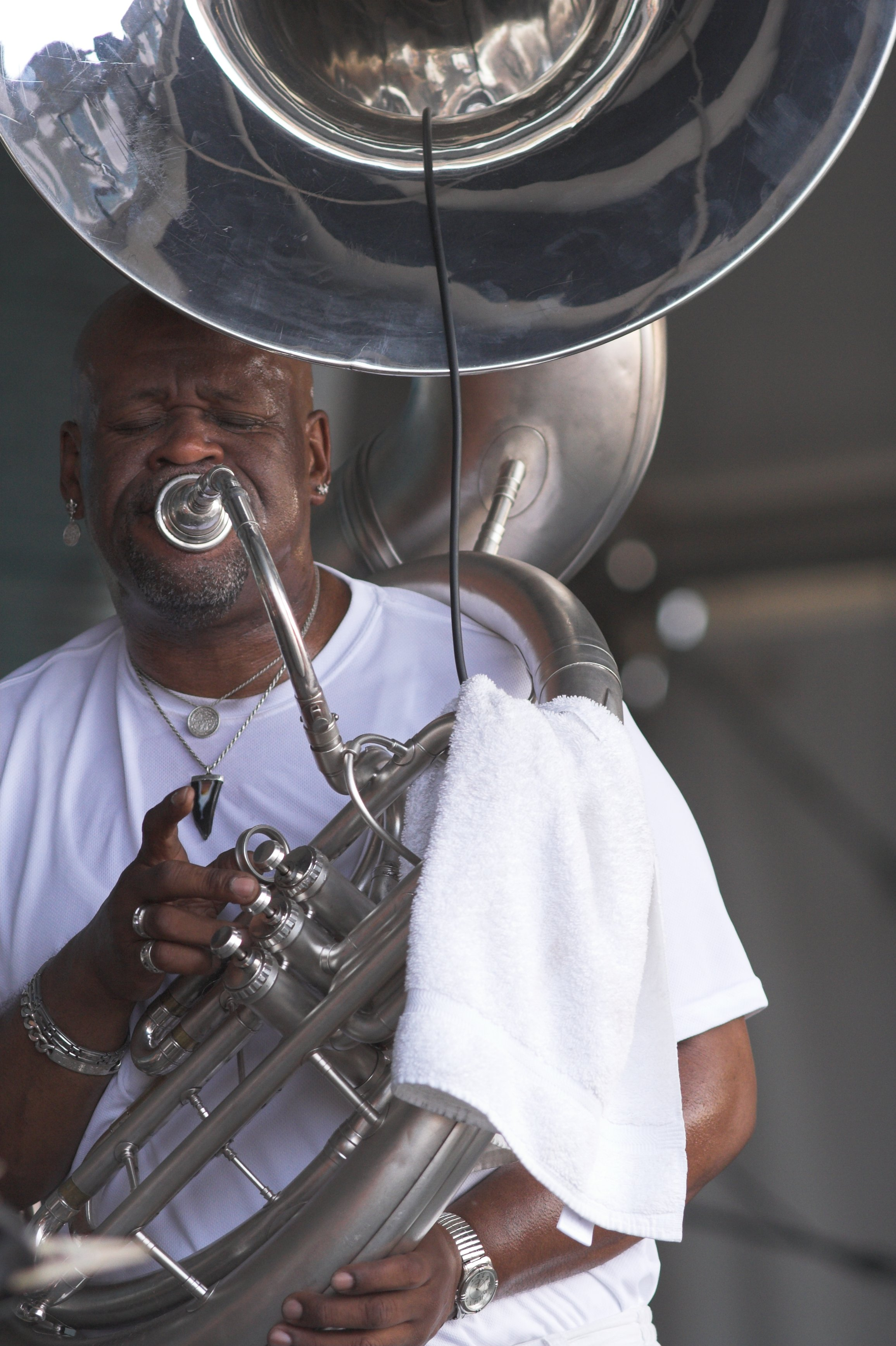
- Kirk Joseph at the New Orleans Jazz & Heritage Festival, 2008

Background information
- Born: February 16, 1961 (age 65); New Orleans
- Genres: Rhythm and blues, Jazz, Funk
- Occupation: Musician
- Instrument: Sousaphone
- Years active: 1977–present

Kirk Joseph (born February 16, 1961) is an American sousaphone and tuba player, recognized as a pioneer in expanding the role of the sousaphone in contemporary brass band, jazz, funk, and rhythm and blues music. He is a founding member of the Dirty Dozen Brass Band and leader of his own ensemble, Kirk Joseph’s Backyard Groove.

== Early life and career ==
Joseph was born in New Orleans, Louisiana, the son of trombonist Waldren "Frog" Joseph. He began playing the sousaphone while attending Andrew Bell Middle School. At age 13, he performed his first professional job in a funeral procession with the Majestic Band, alongside his brother Charles Joseph.

In 1977, Joseph co-founded the Dirty Dozen Brass Band, credited with revitalizing New Orleans brass traditions by incorporating funk, bebop, R&B, and jazz. His innovative playing helped redefine the sousaphone from a supporting bass instrument to a melodic and improvisational voice within modern brass music.

Throughout his career, Joseph has collaborated with numerous artists including Aaron Neville, Dr. John, Elvis Costello, R.E.M., Wynton Marsalis, Branford Marsalis, Taj Mahal, The Manhattan Transfer, Susan Tedeschi, Derek Trucks, Los Lobos, Huey Lewis and the News, Dave Matthews, B.B. King, and Fats Domino.

== Musical style ==
Joseph is widely regarded as a major innovator on the sousaphone. While earlier players such as Anthony "Tuba Fats" Lacen influenced him, Joseph developed a style that integrated strong rhythmic lines with melodic improvisation. His approach elevated the sousaphone from its traditional marching band role into a central instrument across genres, from funk to modern jazz.

== Other contributions ==
Joseph leads the group Kirk Joseph’s Backyard Groove, which blends jazz, funk, Afro-Caribbean rhythms, and R&B. The ensemble has featured Kevin O’Day (drums), Chris Mule and Hiro Mano (guitars), Rasheed "Sheik" Akbar and Eric Traub (saxophones), Raymond Anthony Williams (trumpet), and special guests including Dr. John.

He has appeared on television programs such as The Tonight Show Starring Johnny Carson, Late Show with David Letterman, and the sitcom Gimme a Break!. He also appeared as himself in the HBO series Treme.

Joseph has conducted educational workshops and master classes internationally, including in France, New Orleans, and Maryland.

== Recognition from peers ==
Joseph’s work has drawn high praise from fellow musicians. In a 1989 conversation in Option magazine, Elvis Costello described him as “such an obvious star” and “a one-in-a-million player,” noting his fluency on an instrument rarely associated with melodic brilliance. Tom Waits added that playing the sousaphone is like “dancing with a fat lady,” underscoring the finesse and artistry Joseph brings to the instrument.

== Discography ==
=== Selected albums and collaborations ===
- Spike – Elvis Costello (1989)
- Yellow Moon – The Neville Brothers (1989)
- Twenty Dozen – Dirty Dozen Brass Band (2012)
- Collapse Into Now – R.E.M. (2010)
- GoGo Juice – Jon Cleary (2014, Grammy-winning album)
- Porcupine Meat – Bobby Rush (2016, Grammy-winning album)
- Ske-Dat-De-Dat: The Spirit of Satch – Dr. John (2014)

== Filmography ==
=== Television appearances ===
- The Tonight Show Starring Johnny Carson (two appearances)
- Late Show with David Letterman
- Gimme a Break! (1980s sitcom)
- Treme (HBO series, appeared as himself)

== Awards and honors ==
=== OffBeat's Best of The Beat Awards ===
| Year | Category | Notes | Result | Ref. |
|---|---|---|---|---|
| 2006 | Best Tuba/Sousaphonist | | Won | |
| 2007 | Best Tuba/Sousaphonist | Tied with Philip Frazier and Matt Perrine | Won | |
| 2013 | Best Tuba/Sousaphonist | | Won | |
| 2020 | Best Tuba/Sousaphonist | | Won | |
| 2023 | Best Tuba/Sousaphonist | | Won | |
