= List of Treme episodes =

Treme is an American television drama series created by David Simon and Eric Overmyer. It premiered on HBO on April 11, 2010. The series follows the interconnected lives of a group of New Orleanians in the wake of Hurricane Katrina. Episode titles are primarily taken from a blues or jazz song. The series concluded on December 29, 2013, after four seasons and 36 episodes.

== Series overview ==
Season	Episodes	Originally released	
Season	Episodes	First released	Last released
1	10	April 11, 2010	June 20, 2010
2	11	April 24, 2011	July 3, 2011
3	10	September 23, 2012	November 25, 2012
4	5	December 1, 2013	December 29, 2013

== Episodes ==
=== Season 1 (2010) ===
No. overall	No. in season	Title	Directed by	Written by	Original release date	U.S. viewers (millions)
1	1	"Do You Know What It Means"	Agnieszka Holland	David Simon & Eric Overmyer	April 11, 2010	1.13
Three months after Hurricane Katrina, the New Orleans neighborhood of Tremé holds its first "second-line parade" since the storm. Albert Lambreaux returns to his home to find it ravaged by the flood but begins cleaning up the damage instead of heeding his daughter's pleas to return to Houston. She calls her brother Delmond, who comes down to argue with their father but has no more success. A British television crew interviews Creighton Bernette, who becomes so outraged by their implication that the city isn't worth rebuilding that he throws their microphone into a canal. LaDonna Batiste-Williams finds out from a friend that her brother Daymo, who has been missing since the storm, was in police custody when Katrina hit the city; Toni Bernette is unable to find Daymo on official records of prisoners in custody but she does uncover two newspaper photographs that appear to show him among a group of prisoners being taken across the overpass.
2	2	"Meet De Boys on the Battlefront"	Jim McKay	Story by : David Simon & Eric Overmyer; Teleplay by : Eric Overmyer	April 18, 2010	0.777
Davis McAlary is fired from his DJ job; instead of giving him a loan, his father gets him a new position at a local hotel. When Davis directs three young tourists to a bar in the Seventh Ward and they don't return, Davis is quickly fired. He runs into the kids two days later and they thank him for pointing them to "the real New Orleans". Albert tracks down a young man named Skinny, who stole Albert's tools, and beats him senseless. Albert struggles to reassemble his tribe but only one member is able to show up for practice. Janette Desautel requests a $25,000 loan from her visiting parents to keep her restaurant afloat; her father tells her he can only give her $6,000. Toni believes that she has located Daymo in a Louisiana prison but when she and LaDonna go to see him, the prisoner brought out to meet them is a stranger.
3	3	"Right Place, Wrong Time"	Ernest Dickerson	Story by : David Simon & David Mills; Teleplay by : David Mills	April 25, 2010	0.809
Toni bails out Davis who was jailed for mouthing off to a National Guard officer and in lieu of repayment he begins giving piano lessons to her daughter Sofia. Later, Davis is intrigued by the appearance of multiple attractive young women in his neighborhood and pens an ode to gentrification entitled "Strippers". Toni helps out Antoine Batiste, who is arrested and beaten after bumping a police car with his trombone and he beseeches her to force the police to return the instrument. Albert finds a teenage boy using his house to have sex with a girl and releases him with a warning; the next day, the boy's unsuspecting aunt asks if Albert can find a job for her nephew, Darius, while he's out of school. Creighton finds a video that Sofia has posted on a new website called YouTube in which she complains about having to go to boarding school in Baton Rouge while her New Orleans school is closed. Sonny buys Annie an expensive bottle of wine for her birthday but when Tom McDermott invites her to play with him at a charity benefit and Sonny becomes bored and irritated while waiting for her to finish, he goes home and drinks the wine. Albert discovers the body of one of his tribe members decomposing underneath a boat in the man's garage; he and several other Mardi Gras Indians provide a proper memorial.
4	4	"At the Foot of Canal Street"	Anthony Hemingway	Story by : Eric Overmyer & George Pelecanos; Teleplay by : George Pelecanos	May 2, 2010	0.667
Suffering from a mouth injury incurred during his run-in with the police, Antoine accepts LaDonna's request that he go to Baton Rouge, where her husband Larry performs dental work and Antoine has a rare visit with his sons. Darius is fired from the job Albert found him with his neighbor Robinette's hauling company; later, Darius stumbles on Albert's tribe's Mardi Gras practice. When his aunt discovers him there late that evening, she invites Albert to dinner. Davis' car is crippled by a pothole left by a utility company; when he comes back to retrieve it, he sees the car has been ransacked. Davis is inspired to run for public office on a campaign platform of raising money for city improvements through legalizing and taxing marijuana ("Pot for potholes!"). Creighton films a YouTube video, responding to those who have questioned whether New Orleans is worth saving and signs off with, "Fuck you, you fucking fucks". He is later recognized around town by many admirers of his rant. Delmond's manager convinces him to play a New Orleans-focused tour, despite Delmond's reluctance. Toni finally gets official DNA test results that prove the prisoner using the name Daymo Brooks is not Daymo but an accused murderer named Keevon White. Off-the-record, Keevon admits to switching bracelets with Daymo after the storm, claiming that Daymo agreed to swap in exchange for Keevon's protection in jail but says he doesn’t know where Daymo went after that. Toni has been unsuccessful in finding Antoine's confiscated trombone. Sonny's friends convince him to come to Houston to play at a roadhouse and he makes Annie promise not to play with any other pianists while he's gone. The roadhouse gig goes badly for Sonny, although he convinces the bar's bouncer, who has never seen New Orleans, to come back with them. Sonny returns to find Annie sitting in with the New Orleans Jazz Vipers.
5	5	"Shame, Shame, Shame"	Christine Moore	Story by : David Simon & Eric Overmyer and Lolis Eric Elie; Teleplay by : Lolis Eric Elie	May 9, 2010	0.572
The roadhouse bouncer, Arnie, is staying with Annie and Sonny and confirms Annie's suspicions that Sonny bought drugs while in Houston. Still searching for Antoine's trombone, Toni gives him a connection to a group of wealthy Japanese jazz fans seeking to help New Orleans musicians. One of these fans comes to meet Antoine, buys him a brand-new trombone and gives him a wad of cash. Antoine then discovers his own instrument in a pawn shop. When Toni confronts the police lieutenant about his officers' having pawned Antoine’s trombone, he tells her about the huge issues he's facing with officer morale and says he can’t get upset about a trombone. Albert presses a city council member, Ron Singleton, about why the projects have been closed since Katrina despite incurring no serious damage but Singleton says that reopening the projects isn't up to him. Davis enlists an all-star roster of local musicians to play for free on a recording of his anti-government anthem, "Shame, Shame, Shame". Creighton records another angry YouTube rant but brushes off a query from Toni about getting back to work on his novel, saying he has to focus on planning the upcoming Krewe du Vieux parade for Carnival. Working to prove to the courts that Daymo was in police custody during the storm, Toni discovers that he had been working at Janette's restaurant, Desautel's. Janette tells her that she talked to Daymo the morning Katrina hit but hasn’t heard from him since. A group of celebrity chefs pays an unannounced visit to Desautel's and are much impressed by what Janette offers them. In the midst of another joyful second line, shots ring out and Arnie grabs Annie and shepherds her to safety, leaving Sonny behind; Sonny, fearing that Arnie is moving in on his girl, ejects him from their home.
6	6	"Shallow Water, Oh Mama"	Brad Anderson	Story by : David Simon & Eric Overmyer and Tom Piazza; Teleplay by : Tom Piazza	May 16, 2010	N/A
Creighton’s agent comes to New Orleans to tell Creighton that his publisher still wants the novel about the 1927 flood but she asks if he can include content about Katrina as well; he says he'll deliver the originally planned manuscript. Davis’ political campaign continues in full swing, as he sells CDs of his campaign song and appears on a local TV station's candidates forum. As the suppliers for Janette's restaurant become more demanding, she makes the hard decision to suspend operations indefinitely. LaDonna's mother is hospitalized for breathing problems. In the midst of arguing about whether Annie should accept a solo gig Sonny strikes her and she flees their home; they later reconcile despite Annie's misgivings about his drug use. An aide from Councilman Singleton's office comes to see Albert but instead of bringing news about reopening the projects, all he has to offer is a single FEMA trailer, prompting Albert to throw him out. Toni tracks down the former New Orleans Police Department (NOPD) officer who arrested Daymo for an outstanding warrant on the day Katrina hit; in his abandoned police car, she is thrilled to find the citation that proves Daymo was arrested that day. When she meets with the Assistant District Attorney to request a joint motion for an emergency hearing to locate Daymo in the prison system, the ADA tells her they have a new policy against filing joint motions on emergency hearings. A disillusioned Toni joins her husband and daughter in marching, dressed as Nagin's sperm, in the riotously anti-government Krewe du Vieux parade.
7	7	"Smoke My Peace Pipe"	Simon Cellan Jones	Story by : Eric Overmyer & David Mills; Teleplay by : David Mills & Davis Rogan	May 23, 2010	0.560
Having finally proven that the NOPD had Daymo in custody during the storm, Toni wins a court motion giving the Department of Corrections 72 hours to locate him among their prisoners. Davis' campaign for office is going well enough that a political strategist visits him to encourage him to focus the media's attention on key issues; instead, Davis decides to drop out of the race in exchange for a "Get Out of Jail Free" card from a judge who's backing another candidate. Creighton fails to resume work on his novel and ultimately drafts and films a new YouTube rant about "Katrina fatigue". Janette sells her restaurant equipment and buys a mobile grill that will allow her to cook anywhere. After Davis finds out that she's closed Desautel's, he helps her serve food at an outdoor festival. Albert takes up residence inside the Calliope Projects, hoping the publicity from his arrest will pressure the government into reopening the buildings. When the police come for him, he refuses to kneel to be handcuffed and is viciously beaten for resisting arrest. Annie tries out to join the Pine Leaf Boys on a Canadian tour but chokes at the audition; her fellow musician Harley Watt suspects the problem is her anguish about Sonny. Antoine's friend and mentor Danny passes away in the hospital. After searching through records of prisoners without finding Daymo, Toni and LaDonna eventually discover his body, under a different name, at the government's makeshift morgue. LaDonna refuses to break the news to her mother or to start making funeral arrangements until after Carnival.
8	8	"All on a Mardi Gras Day"	Anthony Hemingway	Eric Overmyer	June 6, 2010	0.541
LaDonna continues to keep her silence over Daymo’s death, which leads her mother to opt out of celebrating Mardi Gras, hopeful that Daymo will be able to join them next year. Albert's hearing is delayed, preventing him from participating in Mardi Gras festivities. Creighton waxes nostalgic about previous parades. All the show's characters enjoy Mardi Gras with the exception of Creighton, whose depression causes him to return home. Sonny goes off by himself and ends up having sex with a woman who hears of his heroic exploits. Annie meets Davis and spends the evening with him. Delmond spots a group of Mardi Gras Indians dancing, raising his spirits. Antoine and LaDonna have a romantic encounter in LaDonna’s bar, causing them to miss having dinner with their loved ones. After serving food throughout the day, Janette spends the evening wandering the streets while drunk. Creighton films an extremely negative YouTube video insinuating that his beloved city and beloved festival have plunged into vulgarity and banality and will probably never return to their past greatness. Deeply melancholic, Creighton goes out on his porch, drinks heavily and passes out, much to the shock of his wife, who finds him the following morning. Delmond bails Albert out of jail. LaDonna begins to make funeral arrangements.
9	9	"Wish Someone Would Care"	Dan Attias	Story by : David Simon & George Pelecanos; Teleplay by : George Pelecanos	June 13, 2010	1.165
Annie tells Sonny she wishes to perform with other musicians and criticizes his behavior, leading Sonny to break up with her. Annie makes temporary living arrangements with a friend. Sonny later calls and asks to meet over coffee. As Albert prepares for Saint Joseph's Day, he is warned by the police not to incite violence. He finds that increased security has been placed on the Calliope projects. Janette organizes a big event at Bacchanal and pays musicians to perform while she provides food. The event is rained out and Janette returns home to find her ceiling leaking. Toni wants an independent autopsy for Daymo but LaDonna refuses to consider one. After learning that LaDonna’s family crypt needs repairs, Antoine offers money to help with the payment, which she accepts. She says that their sexual encounter during Mardi Gras will not lead anywhere. LaDonna is later forced to ask her husband for money. Davis throws a release party for his record and invites Annie. Although she is unable to attend, he tells her that she is welcome anytime. After spending the night with Davis, a defeated Janette announces her plans to move to New York. Creighton assigns The Awakening to his class and speaks of endings and transitions. With a much cheerier disposition, he compliments his wife and daughter, generously tips Annie as she performs and throws himself from the bow of a ferry, killing himself.
10	10	"I'll Fly Away"	Agnieszka Holland	David Simon	June 20, 2010	0.931
Davis returns to his old job as a DJ to fund his full-length CD project. Creighton’s body is found and Toni refuses to honor his wishes for a second line at his funeral. Sonny asks Annie to return to their apartment. Annie repeats her wish to play with other people, causing Sonny to leave and continue to self-destruct. Davis prepares a day to convince Janette to stay in New Orleans but she remains unconvinced and moves to New York. In a poker game, Antoine loses most of the money earned from his latest gig. Albert’s Indian tribe almost has a confrontation with the police but the situation is settled by a community relations officer. Afterwards, Delmond returns to New York. LaDonna still refuses to consider an independent autopsy for Daymo. Annie asks Davis if she can move in with him. Daymo’s funeral is held, while flashbacks show his and other characters' activities on the day of the hurricane.

=== Season 2 (2011) ===
No. overall	No. in season	Title	Directed by	Written by	Original release date	U.S. viewers (millions)
11	1	"Accentuate the Positive"	Anthony Hemingway	Story by : Eric Overmyer & Anthony Bourdain; Teleplay by : Eric Overmyer	April 24, 2011	0.605
Fourteen months after Katrina hit New Orleans, on All Saints' Day, the characters remember their deceased loved ones and focus on continuing to cope with the struggles in their lives. Antoine is pressured by his girlfriend Desiree to get a more serious job. Toni appears to have parenting issues with her daughter Sofia, who has been irritable ever since her father's death. Sonny survives a deadly shooting incident in a bar; he misses his relationship with Annie, who is now living with Davis McAlary. Albert Lambreaux is evicted from the bar he used to operate and live in. NOPD lieutenant Terry Colson is facing a rise in crime. Real estate developer Nelson Hidalgo arrives in New Orleans with plans to help rebuild the city. In New York City, Delmond Lambreaux is offended by jazz club guests criticizing New Orleans music and the city's inability to recover, while Janette Desautel is now working in an elite restaurant under the renowned but surly chef Enrico Brulard.
12	2	"Everything I Do Gonh Be Funky"	Tim Robbins	David Simon	May 1, 2011	0.560
Vincent Abreu approaches Toni to investigate the death of his son from the storm. He was told by the police that his son was killed by looters but is not given the full story by the NOPD. Albert moves into his old house, which is in worse shape than the bar that he lived in. LaDonna decides to increase customer traffic by offering live music in her bar. Tired of playing for tips on the streets, Sonny looks for bands needing a guitarist. Antoine considers starting his own band and begins looking for other musicians. For Thanksgiving, Annie has dinner with Davis and his family, much to his dismay. Nelson assembles a team of haulers to begin demolition and debris removal work.
13	3	"On Your Way Down"	Simon Cellan Jones	James Yoshimura	May 8, 2011	0.518
Toni interviews Officer James Distel about Abreu's death and he says he found the body decomposing inside the store, along with bullet casings, which he submitted along with a written report to his captain (Colson told Toni that Distel never filed a report of the murder). Antoine begins rehearsals with his new band mates and believes they need a guitarist to fill out their sound. When collecting mail at Janette's house, Davis discovers her house has been robbed. Janette is forced to return to New Orleans to deal with the issue. When returning home, Sonny sees police raiding his apartment and taking his room mates into custody. In his wrecked apartment, he finds his keyboard is broken and his guitar is missing. Nelson gives Robinette another job and puts him in charge of the demolition. Sofia begins an internship at councilman Oliver Thomas's office. Desiree gets Antoine a job interview at an elementary school as a music instructor but he ends up leaving when he gets there as he is overwhelmed by all the kids running around. Sonny borrows Harley's guitar so he can audition for Antoine's band, Antoine Batiste and His Soul Apostles. Delmond fires his manager after poor music sales for his latest album. Albert has not begun working on his Indian suit for Carnival but is approved for the Road Home program. LaDonna is attacked by men after closing up the bar. A passerby finds her unconscious and beaten, lying on the floor of her bar and brings her to the hospital. At the hospital LaDonna makes it clear she does not want her husband Larry to know she was raped.
14	4	"Santa Claus, Do You Ever Get the Blues?"	Alex Zakrzewski	Story by : Eric Overmyer & Lolis Eric Elie; Teleplay by : Lolis Eric Elie	May 15, 2011	0.561
Antoine is hired as an assistant music instructor at a middle school. Toni speaks with a witness who says police were beating people during the Abreu incident but will not testify. A documentary film maker asks Albert if she can film the process of the making of the suits but he declines. He eventually allows her to film them on Mardi Gras day. Davis gets his Aunt to invest $5,000 in his new record label. Annie performs onstage with Shawn Colvin and is later introduced to her manager. Sonny auditions for the Soul Apostles but Antoine is not overly impressed. LaDonna, still shaken by the attack, continues working at the bar but not at night. Janette, fed up with how her boss treats her, learns Alan Richman (played by himself) who criticized New Orleans restaurants and cuisine in a GQ article, is in the restaurant and she splashes a Sazerac at him. Davis and Aunt Mimi launch their new record label and begin recording with local musicians. Antoine's band debuts for the first time live and when their guitarist June Yamagishi is unavailable for a Christmas Eve gig, they hire Sonny. Delmond, who has now rehired his manager, tells him his plans for a new record, to incorporate the roots of New Orleans jazz into his modern jazz. Delmond runs into Janette, remembers having seen her in the airport the previous year and invites her to his New Year's Eve gig. Sonny is warned by a band mate about blowing his chance at a steady gig due to his drug use. Antoine asks LaDonna to give their sons the Christmas gifts he bought for them. Delmond takes his father out for Christmas dinner and suggests Albert is depressed. Later, Delmond apologizes to his father for his comment and they smoke a joint and laugh together.
15	5	"Slip Away"	Rob Bailey	Story by : David Simon & Mari Kornhauser; Teleplay by : Mari Kornhauser	May 22, 2011	0.591
Albert receives a visit from a city inspector, who says he needs a permit for the work he has been doing to his house and until he gets a licensed plumber to redo the work, his water will be shut off. Albert's Road Home application is rejected as it needs his wife's signature, even though she died in 2003. Fed up, Albert begins packing, ready to move back to Houston. Janette apologizes to Tom Colicchio for the incident involving Alan Richman and he refers her to chef Eric Ripert for a new job. Ripert hires her but she will have to start at the bottom. Davis continues his music recording project, wondering what New Orleans musicians they should get. Davis discovers an impressive rapper named Lil Calliope. Colson investigates the first murder in his district. He believes another crime, a break-in, is related but other officers disagree. LaDonna remains shaken by her attack and is unable to work at the bar at night. Annie begins trying to write her own music. Under financial pressure, Toni reluctantly hands off the Abreu case to another law clinic. Thousands of New Orleans citizens march on City Hall to protest the increasing violence in the city.
16	6	"Feels Like Rain"	Roxann Dawson	Story by : Eric Overmyer & Tom Piazza; Teleplay by : Tom Piazza	May 29, 2011	0.531
Toni awakens from a dream featuring her deceased husband, Creighton. Delmond invites his father to stay with him in New York, where he says he has been working on his suit for Mardi Gras and would like his father's help. Delmond shows his father the suit he has been making and tells him it is for Albert to wear on Mardi Gras. Antoine continues to teach his middle school students about jazz music. Sofia finally finds out about her father's suicide. Annie continues to struggle with writing original music lyrics. Sonny is late for his gig with the Soul Apostles and receives half pay and a warning. Sonny is late for his next gig as well and receives half pay and notice he's been fired. Davis, his band and Lil Calliope begin rehearsing. Janette returns to New Orleans to help Jacques, who has been arrested for being in the country illegally. Toni discovers that shell casings matching the ones found from the Abreu murder match the ones from another murder. Detectives visit LaDonna and show her photos of men who were arrested for a similar crime the previous week; LaDonna easily identifies them. Colson joins Toni for a second line parade.
17	7	"Carnival Time"	Brad Anderson	David Simon & Eric Overmyer	June 5, 2011	0.550
Toni suggests to Sofia that they might scatter her father's ashes in the river at Mardi Gras. However, Sofia slips away, leaving Toni to scatter Creighton's ashes in the Mississippi alone, while Sofia gets drunk at a bar and has to be rescued by Davis. Delmond enjoys the parade in the company of his father. Annie travels to the countryside to experience a Courir de Mardi Gras. Cornell helps Sonny rejoin the Soul Apostles, on condition that Sonny gets clean; Cornell gets him temporary work on an oyster boat, so Sonny misses Mardi Gras and its temptations. Colson is satisfied with a relatively peaceful Mardi Gras after having earlier apprehended a gun-wielding teenager.
18	8	"Can I Change My Mind"	Ernest Dickerson	Story by : Eric Overmyer & James Yoshimura; Teleplay by : James Yoshimura	June 12, 2011	0.440
LaDonna breathes a sigh of relief to learn she did not suffer any long term damage but continues to try to hold back a few details from her husband. DJ Davis' band premiers with a parody of George W. Bush. Annie works out her new song with Harley and is eventually convinced to play in public, at the Carrollton Station. Theophile Jones Elie (TJE) school band finally gets their instruments and works on the basics. Delmond comes up with a scheme to help his father with "advances" on a fusion jazz/Indian recording and recruits an all-star band. Sofia gets arrested for possession and reveals she was aware of her father's suicide. Hidalgo manages to sell his printer cables to the city at the original inflated price. Anthony talks to George about Seals' murder. Janette explores a more creative occupation after sampling a Nick's rendition of a David Chang special. Antoine expresses remorse about failing to insist his sons play musical instruments. Albert is hesitant about Delmond's idea. While Hidalgo is dining at the Palm Court Jazz Cafe, Delmond sits in with trumpeter Leroy Jones and plays Jones's composition "Carnival's In Town". Annie sings her song publicly for the first time with Davis watching from a distance.
19	9	"What Is New Orleans?"	Adam Davidson	Story by : David Simon & George Pelecanos; Teleplay by : George Pelecanos	June 19, 2011	0.572
Lil Calliope upstages Davis' 58 Mercury Monterrey records promotion at WWOZ with his own club dance track, which is repeatedly aired later that day. Sofia is snotty during her consultation with a third party lawyer. Annie meets Harley's English friend, Jim Lynch. Annie and Harley make plans to play the square later, after dark, where they later have a profitable set. TJE school band plays a reasonably good rendition of "Fever" and starts raising their expectations. Lt. Colson is transferred to the Homicide unit under Captain Guidry. Chief Lambreaux is particular about the bass playing, the New York studio, and the rest of the arrangements for Delmond's recording. LaDonna learns that her case is on the vanguard for prosecuting her assailants. Janette is enjoying working for David Chang in New York. Antoine steals Kermit's audience from the Boom Boom Room and leads them to the Blue Nile like the pied piper; he sneaks in his middle school student, Robert, telling the bouncer Robert is his son. Kermit seeks his revenge a set later. Lt. Colson takes Toni out for a drink but learns she is still hurting about her husband's death. Toni's witnesses clam up in fear of police retaliation. Annie and Harley are held up on their walk back, and Harley is shot dead.
20	10	"That's What Lovers Do"	Agnieszka Holland	Eric Overmyer	June 26, 2011	0.721
Annie, Davis, Sonny, and company have an impromptu memorial service for Harley and make a shrine at the site. Robert asks Antoine for help starting a street band. Alex stops by and adds a wicked guitar solo to DJ Davis' numbers. Antoine finally pays a cab fare in full. LaDonna decides to sell the bar and takes her stress out on Antoine and later the rest of her family. James says the new record will stay in the red as a result of spending so much time in the studio. Delmond has other ideas. Hidalgo goes around buying individual houses on spec. Annie and Davis pack up Harley's things for Goodwill, and let Sonny keep Harley's guitar. Sofia begins to enjoy her new job at the coffee house. Janette knocks her co-workers' socks off with a fried chicken and rice flour waffles luncheon and is later asked to lead with her own southern specialties. Toni tells Terry that she has casings from the shootings. Lt. Colson later finds a cache of relevant evidence. Davis has to bump one of his songs off of the sampler to add Lil Calliope's new hit. Sonny makes a pass at Linh and learns he has to secure her father's permission. Wanda curses Antoine and walks off stage after he upstages her song with quips. Delmond's all-star band prefers the New Orleans take of the Indian/Jazz song. Harley's sister drops by to pick up Harley's "This Machine Floats" acoustic guitar and mentions he was from Washington, not Texas.
21	11	"Do Whatcha Wanna"	Ernest Dickerson	Story by : David Simon & Anthony Bourdain; Teleplay by : David Simon	July 3, 2011	0.664
Antoine begins to get discouraged and later quits his Soul Apostles band. Janette returns to New Orleans to see her sous-chef released on bail and extends him some additional liberties. Janette is later offered a sweet deal to manage a new restaurant back in New Orleans—much to the chagrin of David Chang. Sonny is traded to Linh's dad's shrimp boat for the day. Lt. Colson collects the casings from a weary Toni. LaDonna prepares to sell the bar with some nostalgia. Davina, Delmond, Cheri, and James pool up $20,000 to give Chief Lambreaux as supposed royalties. Lambreaux believes them and proclaims "We gotta cut another record!". Davis learns that Alex is the new lead guitarist and Lil Calliope adds his new numbers to the second set. Toni visits an ex judge friend in prison. Nelson learns he is off the list of approved vendors because Councilman Thomas is under investigation. Lt. Colson, feigns the casings making a connection shortly before they mysteriously get lost. The Lambreauxs are invited to play the first Friday of Jazz Fest. Ladonna sees her rapist at large, calls 911, and in her anger finds herself again. Her husband realizes she should not sell the bar and that he needs to move his practice back to New Orleans. Sonny is somber about slow leaks in the gulf but is later approved to date Linh. Jill declines storing Delmond's stuff since they are not an exclusive item. Lt. Colson turns the case over to the FBI. The same agent gets amnesia when Toni talks to them. Toni later cold shoulders Terry at the coffee shop. Aunt Mimi gives Davis a check for his half of selling Lil Calliope to another label—less his expenses. Davis forgets his marijuana for the Jazz Fest and later dons an "uptown" New Orleans persona to perform James Brown's "Sex Machine", quitting the band with his dignity intact. Antoine learns Henry Butler chose a different trombone player to play Japan. Antoine sponsors some tutoring lessons for Robert and later coaches some of him and a select band of his fellows to play The Rebirth Brass Band's "Do Whatcha Wanna". Sofia gets a reprieve from being grounded at the Jazz Fest. Antoine and his family get a new house. Davis can't sleep and returns to WWOZ.

=== Season 3 (2012) ===
No. overall	No. in season	Title	Directed by	Written by	Original release date	U.S. viewers (millions)
22	1	"Knock with Me – Rock with Me"	Anthony Hemingway	Story by : David Simon & Anthony Bourdain; Teleplay by : David Simon	September 23, 2012	0.568
Two years after Hurricane Katrina life in New Orleans is returning to normal. Antoine Batiste and some other musicians are arrested when police try to shut down the unauthorized street concert because of noise complaints. DJ Davis is trying to get a new music project off the ground and to raise money he offers music history tours for tourists, without much success. Delmond and his father, Big Chief Albert Lambreaux, enjoy the critical success of their new hybrid jazz and Mardi Gras Indian record but Albert has developed an ominous cough. Toni Bernette meets with L.P. Everett, an out-of-town reporter investigating suspected police killings after Katrina. LaDonna and her family have returned to New Orleans and Annie's musical career is taking off. Chef Janette Desautel is finding success as a New York chef under the tutelage of David Chang.
23	2	"Saints"	Jim McKay	Eric Overmyer	September 30, 2012	0.538
Antoine begins to blossom as a teacher and his students start to show interest. LaDonna becomes fed up living with her in-laws while her rape case is grinding its way slowly through the justice system. She struggles with trying to find a way forward with her life. Delmond is settling back in New Orleans and worried about his father’s mysterious cough which is diagnosed as Chronic Obstructive Pulmonary Disease (COPD) contracted from decades of plastering without a mask. Detective Terry Colson moves back into Toni's orbit after her long-time friend and hairdresser is found bludgeoned to death, when both suspect the investigation has been inadequate. Nelson Hidalgo is still trying make some money by doing good and wrests some contracts from the New Orleans Affordable Homeownership (NOAH) program. Davis is chasing his dream of a New Orleans R&B opera but finding few supporters.
24	3	"Me Donkey Want Water"	Adam Davidson	George Pelecanos	October 7, 2012	0.484
Janette moves back to New Orleans after being convinced by Tim, a restaurant tycoon, that she will have full creative control and free hand with food costs, although Jacques expresses misgivings about the plan. Annie also finds some potential success with her newly retained agent who asks her to sign a "standard contract". Meanwhile, Nelson expands his NOAH project work, but at the same time begins to doubt whether it is of any real value. Finally, after an extended courtship, Sonny wins over Linh's ultra-protective father, who finally leaves Linh and Sonny alone providing an opportunity for them to consummate their relationship. Antoine goes on tour with Tab Benoit who is well known for his version of "Me Donkey Want Water". Toni places an ad in a local paper asking other victims of Officer Billy Wilson to come forward, realizing that this makes her and her daughter even more the target of corrupt police. Albert is diagnosed with non-Hodgkin lymphoma (NHL) and given a 50 percent chance of survival.
25	4	"The Greatest Love"	Ernest Dickerson	Story by : David Simon; Teleplay by : Mari Kornhauser & Chris Yakaitis	October 14, 2012	0.523
Albert grapples with his diagnosis and tells Delmond that he has cancer. Albert decides to make the most of whatever time he has left and he strikes a deal with LaDonna, enabling the Indians hold their weekly practice at her bar. Janette begins setting up her new restaurant venture with her partner Tim but she begins to find that attitudinal differences are starting to appear. Delmond is approached by a developer interested in building a major jazz performance center but is skeptical about the project. Annie goes on tour leaving a gap in Davis’s life that he did not expect. Nelson starts to become frustrated at being shut out of big money projects because he is still seen as an outsider. Toni and Everett have started collaborating and trading information, causing the New Orleans Police Department (NOPD) to turn up the pressure on them both and harass Sofia.
26	5	"I Thought I Heard Buddy Bolden Say"	Alex Hall	Story by : Eric Overmyer; Teleplay by : Lolis Eric Elie & Jen Ralston	October 21, 2012	0.602
Tension is mounting between the residents and the City Council over the four housing projects. Desiree arrives in time to see her mother's house demolished, although it was also listed for remediation. Albert and Delmond are pepper-sprayed while at a demonstration outside the City Council building, the council having managed to keep anti-demolition protesters out of the public meeting. Nelson realizes that he has been excluded from large contracts by his erstwhile partner, C. J. Liguori. It is Christmas and family tensions are on the rise; Albert is surrounded by his family for Christmas dinner, concerned that it will be his last. Annie's parents visit New Orleans and although her mother is disappointed that she's not pursuing a classical career, she comes to appreciate Annie's musical talents. Davis and his parents have opposing views about the value of the projects which they see as being a breeding ground for criminals. Relations between LaDonna and her brother-in-law Bernard remain frosty and she refuses to join the in-laws for Christmas dinner, offering instead to host them at her bar. Toni and Everett continue their investigation of the Glover homicide while the police continue to harass Toni's 16-year-old daughter Sofia.
27	6	"Careless Love"	Anthony Hemingway	Story by : George Pelecanos & Chris Offutt; Teleplay by : Chris Offutt	October 28, 2012	0.491
Sonny's downward spiral of substance abuse continues, with his failing to board Tran's fishing boat and later humbly asking his forgiveness; he later fails to show for a music gig. Albert ignores his doctor's advice and refuses to start chemotherapy until after the Mardi Gras, frustrating his daughter's good intentions to help him. Davis continues pushing for his R&B opera, seeking the support of new Orleans legends such as Fats Domino. Janette is discovering more of the implications of working for a corporate restaurant chain and doesn't care for her new roles of manager and spokesperson, taking her away from her first love of cooking. Antoine is horrified to discover that Jennifer, his 14-year-old trumpet protégée, is illiterate but even more horrified that the charter school enthusiasts are more interested in a smoothly operating school than the individual students. Toni and Everett track down an out-of-town pathologist who worked on the Henry Glover case and provides more ammunition for their case that Glover was shot and burned post-mortem, providing further evidence implicating the local authorities in a cover-up. Sofia's romance with the 27-year-old street musician sours, with her surprisingly calling him "immature".
28	7	"Promised Land"	Tim Robbins	Story by : David Simon & Chris Rose; Teleplay by : Chris Rose & Micah Kibodeaux	November 4, 2012	0.560
Albert, Delmond and his "tribe" work to finish their suits for Mardi Gras. Delmond meets Kimberly who gives him a DVD of the film Trouble the Water, which has a dramatic effect on the family. Colson is warned off by a colleague for being hard on officers he sees as being derelict in their duties. Judge Gatling manages to get Toni to relax for a short while after she interrupts him at lunch for an ex-parte decision. Davis' aunt has to tell him that he needs a veteran singer for his songs but he takes it badly. Janette takes the advice of an old friend and decides to make the restaurant a success in spite of the commercial pressures. On Mardi Gras Day 2008, Antoine's school band goes public and has a happy interaction with the tight yet loose, Marine marching band. Albert finishes the day pleased with his tribe's performance but leaving him coughing and exhausted. Annie takes time out of her tour playing with bands like the Neville Brothers for people who seem to care little about the music. She returns to New Orleans for Mardi Gras and shares a tender moment with Harley’s sister as she scatters his ashes in the river. After a very long, emotional and boozy day, Davis and Janette spend the night together. Sonny manages to stay clean for a couple of weeks and is taken back by Linh's father, Tran.
29	8	"Don't You Leave Me Here"	Ernest Dickerson	Story by : Eric Overmyer; Teleplay by : Tom Piazza	November 11, 2012	0.496
Janette and her crew have the successful soft opening of her high-end restaurant, DeSautel's, received with acclaim by other chefs but not without excellent customer management by her head waiter, Derek. Davis continues his frustration in the lack of control he has over his R&B opera project, disagreeing with Aunt Mimi over the CD cover design. LaDonna confesses to Larry that she is being intimidated by friends of the robber she's about to testify against but Larry’s reassurance cannot dispel her fears. After his last night drinking for a while, Albert Lambreaux commences his first chemotherapy session and his family suffer the effects with him. Sonny proposes to Linh and she accepts but Sonny still needs Tran's permission. Antoine takes his first steps in learning modern jazz but it is a challenge for the veteran trombone player. The NOPD continue their harassment of Sofia to maintain pressure on Toni for investigating misconduct in their ranks. Eventually Toni sends Sofia to live with her grandmother in Florida and she reluctantly goes. The harassment of Ladonna continues.
30	9	"Poor Man's Paradise"	Roxann Dawson	Story by : George Pelecanos & Jordan Hirsch; Teleplay by : George Pelecanos	November 18, 2012	0.590
Lieutenant Terry Colson is set up by his colleagues and takes a beating during an investigation while two uniformed officers and his partner sit idly by. Bucking under the pressure on her and Sophia, Toni Bernette decides to call off her investigation of Officer Wilson until she is presented with a witness to the shooting of Joseph Abreu in a supermarket. Janette is finding that she has much less control of her restaurant than she expected, with Tim hosting his freeloading friends at her expense, while she and her crew have become prisoners of her signature crawfish ravioli. Annie also finds that she has less control of her life that she expected, with her manager Marvin and the recording studio running the show. As Delmond becomes more involved in the proposed jazz center, he begins to have misgivings, especially when Albert suspects that it will not be benefit the local community. Toni suspects that Terry is crooked but is reassured by the FBI agent that Terry has been tracking evidence to implicate crooked officers in cover-ups and she reconciles with him. After weeks of intimidation, LaDonna's bar, GiGi's, is set on fire to stop her from testifying against the men who raped her. To find some relief for the pressure, LaDonna pays visit to Albert during his chemotherapy session.
31	10	"Tipitina"	Anthony Hemingway	Story by : David Simon & Anthony Bourdain; Teleplay by : David Simon & Eric Overmyer	November 25, 2012	0.473
Two weeks after the fire that destroyed her bar, LaDonna gets a visit from the insurance assessor looking for reasons to void her claim. Everett has his article on the NOPD involvement in the death of Henry Glover and Toni manages to interest the FBI in the Abreu shooting. Davis announces his departure from the music industry with a song entitled "I Quit" which becomes a minor hit, while Annie has a CD released of her own music. Delmond quits consulting on the jazz center when he realizes that developers are in bed with Mayor Ray Nagin. Desiree seems to finally be getting some results over the home demolitions. Janette finds out more of the downsides of her contract with Tim. He owns her name and she feels trapped but she still manages to cater for a benefit concert for LaDonna and her burned-out bar. Just about everyone attends the benefit and surrounded by her friends, LaDonna cheers up for a while. Sofia returns home to find Terry has been staying overnight with her mother, Toni. At the court case of LaDonna's rapists, the jury is deadlocked and the case is dismissed, leaving LaDonna disillusioned. As the season ends, life in New Orleans goes on; Antoine's efforts with the school band is achieving results; Toni, Terry and Sophia are upbeat; Sonny and Linh are married with her father's blessing; Annie and Davis go their separate ways; LaDonna starts cleaning up the ruins of her bar and at his chemotherapy session, Albert is sewing panels for his next Mardi Gras suit.

=== Season 4 (2013) ===
No. overall	No. in season	Title	Directed by	Written by	Original release date	U.S. viewers (millions)
32	1	"Yes We Can Can"	Anthony Hemingway	David Simon & Eric Overmyer & George Pelecanos	December 1, 2013	0.560
Three years after Hurricane Katrina, New Orleans is still recovering. Albert Lambreaux is in remission and helps LaDonna rebuilds Gigi's bar while his son Delmond stays on in New Orleans, missing out on career opportunities in New York. Antoine Batiste is drawn more into his students' lives but at the same time feels that music's evolution is leaving him behind. Davis McAlary has the same feeling and realizes that he must adapt, while Annie is torn between staying with her band or pursuing her career. Janette Desautel starts again from scratch and prepares to open her own restaurant in Bywater. In the background, it is a Federal election and even the cynical Albert is drawn out to vote for Barack Obama, who becomes the new president.
33	2	"This City"	Anthony Hemingway	George Pelecanos	December 8, 2013	N/A
Albert is devastated to learn that his cancer has spread; he decides to quit chemotherapy and takes his daughter on a tour of his old neighborhood. Nelson introduces Davis to C. J. Liguori as a potential liaison agent with the community for the proposed jazz center but he's not the right fit. Janette is about to open her new restaurant but is sued by Tim Feeny over the use of her name. She tries to talk him out of the legal action but he pointedly refuses, still bitter about her departure. To his surprise, Janette reconnects with Davis. Batiste becomes more caught up in the lives of his students after a girl's boyfriend is shot by mistake and she is later killed because she may be a witness. The senseless violence also affects Toni and Terry's relationship as she becomes increasingly frustrated at the inaction of the FBI in cleaning up the NOPD.
34	3	"Dippermouth Blues"	Ernest Dickerson	Eric Overmyer	December 15, 2013	0.521
New Year's Eve. Frustrated after his gig is cancelled, Davis reminisces about the old days in New Orleans with Janette, whose restaurant is having a quiet night due to its lack of champagne. The following morning they wake up together. Later, Davis discusses the legal possibilities of revitalizing the Rampart Street clubs with Toni. Albert continues to work on his costume, telling everyone he will have it finished for Mardi Gras. Delmond is concerned about his father's deteriorating health and is not certain he will be in a fit state to lead his tribe. Antoine runs into his missing pupil Jennifer on Bourbon Street. He helps her enter a club so she see the other students playing and encourages her to return to his class. Later, Antoine is hired to coach an actor in how to fake trombone playing for a movie project but eventually questions its authenticity. Terry Colson's precinct is raided by the FBI and later he confronts his chief, telling him he will testify if he is called. The following day Terry finds his car vandalized. Annie is back in New Orleans and enjoying playing again with local musicians.
35	4	"Sunset on Louisianne"	Alex Hall	David Simon	December 22, 2013	0.348
Davis celebrates his 40th birthday and contemplates his legacy. He tries to interest Nelson and the jazz center investors in his dream of opening a club, but when that stalls, he ponders a long-term commitment to Janette. Everett returns to New Orleans and is approached by the FBI and the U.S. Attorney about the Glover case. Terry contemplates other career paths while trying to be useful to the FBI's investigation. Toni makes headway on a new case and is heartened by the FBI's moves toward justice. Annie leaves her band on good terms to make a record in Nashville. Antoine learns that the after-school band program is being cut for financial reasons, leaving him discouraged. He returns to his old habits of gigging all night long into the next exhausting day of second-lines. The renovations on the Lambreaux house are all but finished but Albert is too weak to leave his bed. As his condition worsens, he admits that he cannot make the Mardi Gras walk and that Delmond will lead the Guardians of the Flame this year. Though LaDonna feels like an interloper with the Lambreaux family, she alone is with Albert when he dies in his sleep.
36	5	"...To Miss New Orleans"	Agnieszka Holland	David Simon & Eric Overmyer	December 29, 2013	0.397
It's Mardi Gras, 2009. Delmond refuses the Big Chief's headdress but he honors his father's legacy by deciding to raise his daughter in the traditions of New Orleans. Annie argues with her manager over the recording of her album, wanting to stay authentic to the culture of New Orleans she came to love, impressing him with her backbone. She shares a moment at a concert with Sonny, who is encouraged by his wife to return to performing. Although he tries to mature, Davis gleefully falls back into old habits. Nelson collects his paycheck and returns to Texas full-time, although he manages to con Janette's old boss into giving her back her restaurant naming rights. Toni continues to fight for justice and she reunites with a visiting Sofia over old traditions. Terry leaves the city after testifying against NOPD and taking early retirement. Everett struggles to spur institutional change through his investigative journalism. Antoine manages to find a program for his band students now that the school cut funding and he fulfills a dream by playing a gig with Dr. John while his sons watch. Ladonna arranges for the boys to live with Antoine until she can get her own place, although Larry still expresses interest in their family reconciling. At the parade, a gunman shoots several bystanders but Ladonna and the boys are uninjured. Potholes go unfixed, justice is served only in small doses, jazz centers go unbuilt and the passage of time continues in the Treme.

== Ratings ==
Treme : U.S. viewers per episode (thousands)

Season	Episode number										
Season	1	2	3	4	5	6	7	8	9	10	11
1	1130	777	809	667	572	620	560	541	1165	931	–
2	605	560	518	561	591	531	550	440	572	721	664
3	568	538	484	523	602	491	560	496	590	473	–
4	560	N/A	521	348	397	–					

Audience measurement performed by Nielsen Media Research
