= Lolis =

Greek-American name and surname. Notable individuals

Lolis is a Greek surname and American given name. Notable people with the name include:

== Surname ==
- Alexandros Lolis (born 2002), Greek professional footballer
- Jon Lolis, Albanian-Greek actor

== Given name ==
- Lolis Elie (died 2017), American lawyer and civil rights activist
- Lolis Eric Elie (born 1963), American writer, journalist, documentary filmmaker, and food historian

== See also ==
- Loli (disambiguation)
- Lolicon, also called loli (plural lolis), a sexualized childlike female character in Japanese anime and manga
