= Skip Bolen =

American photographer

Skip Bolen is a Southern photographer of musicians, architecture, lifestyle and the culture of New Orleans. Born in Lafayette, Louisiana, he moved to New Orleans where he began his publishing career as a designer and art director. After moving to New York City, he began working at House & Garden, renamed HG, as Senior Designer in January 1988 with Anna Wintour and Alexander Liberman at Condé Nast Publications. Spending evenings in jazz clubs, he began photographing jazz musicians in New York City and often when he regularly returned to New Orleans. After three years at Condé Nast Publications in New York City, he returned to New Orleans to pursue his jazz photography full-time. In 1998, he moved to Los Angeles where he became art director of House of Blues for seven years while photographing at night and weekends. He continued photographing jazz musicians and had his first major solo exhibition at the Jazz Bakery in Los Angeles on August 9, 2002. On July 4, 2006, he returned to New Orleans to pursue photography full-time documenting the recovery and rebuilding of New Orleans since Hurricane Katrina, documenting the jazz scene, night-time photography and other photographic projects.

His black-and-white photographic images of jazz musicians are often shot only in natural light in jazz clubs, jazz festivals and concerts. Prominent examples of his jazz photography are in the collections of the Ogden Museum of Southern Art and the Louisiana State Museum. He is a frequent contributor to JazzTimes (where he is listed on the masthead) and Down Beat magazine. Other works include an architectural project that capture the romance and nostalgia of vintage signs, landmarks, and other points of interest shot in and around New York, Los Angeles, and his hometown of New Orleans. He frequently photographs celebrities and high-profile events for Getty Images and Wireimage.

Skip Bolen is a still photographer and currently a member of IATSE Local 600 (International Cinematographers Guild). Bolen was the unit still photographer for Season 1 of K-Ville, the Fox Broadcasting Company show filmed for 11 episodes on location in New Orleans. Bolen was also the unit still photographer for the pilot episode of HBO's Treme created by David Simon and Eric Overmyer, a New Orleans-set drama scheduled to premiere in April 2010. The original HBO series is about New Orleanians, their unique culture and community, and ongoing efforts to recover from Katrina. The TV drama focuses on the city's musicians and Tremé neighborhood, an important center of African-American and Creole traditions. Bolen was also the unit still photographer for HBO's "True Blood" Season Two finale with Anna Paquin and Stephen Moyer when they were shooting in Baton Rouge, LA. Bolen was also the unit still photographer for Season 1 and Season 2 of TNT's "Memphis Beat" that filmed in New Orleans. He is the photographer for the New Orleans book Vieux Carré Chic: The Art of Overindulgent Home Décor written by TJ Fisher. He is currently represented by Stella Jones Gallery in New Orleans.
