= Nina Kostroff Noble =

American television producer (born 1959)

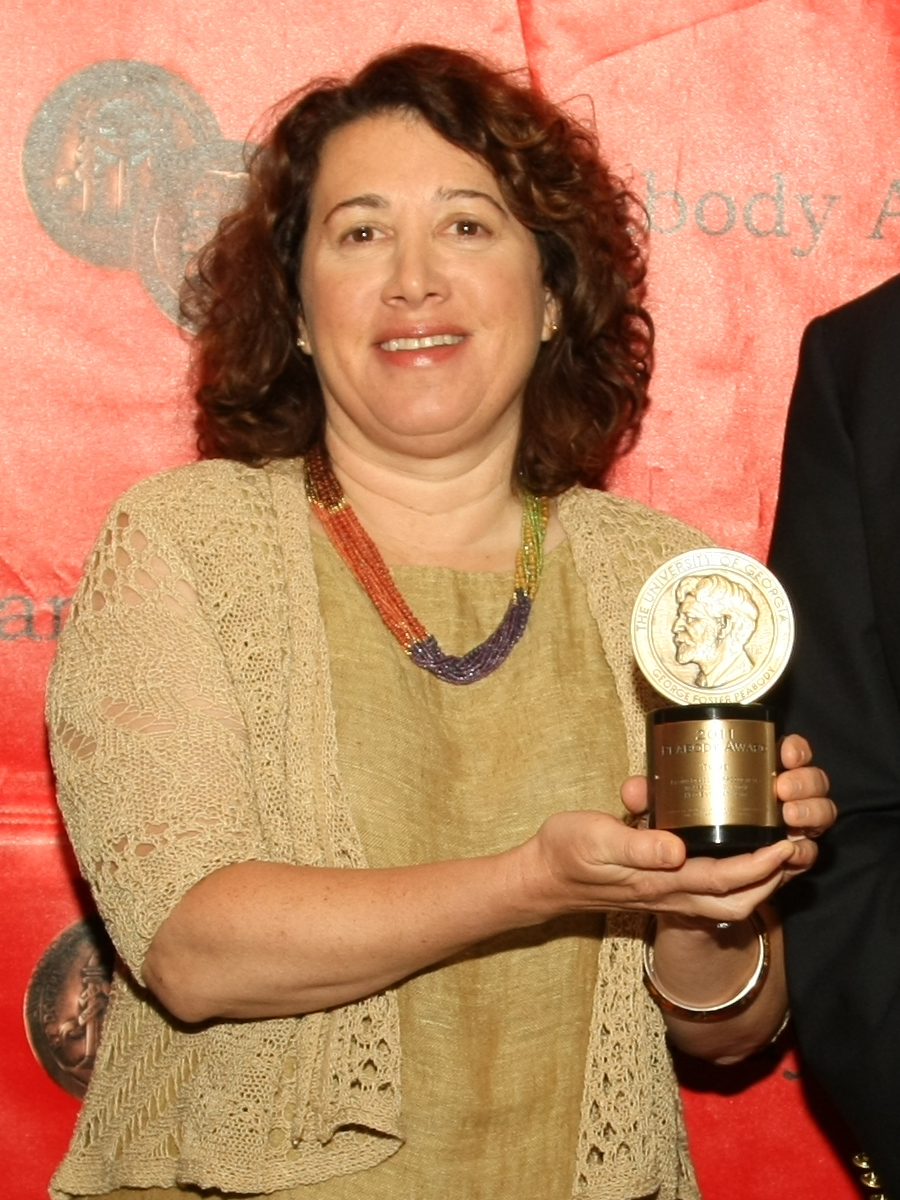
- Noble in 2012
- Born: Nina Kostroff; October 1, 1959 (age 66)
- Occupation: Producer
- Known for: The Wire; Treme; Show Me a Hero
- Spouse: David Noble
- Children: 2

Nina Kostroff Noble is an American television producer.

== Early life and education ==
Noble is the daughter of Pat Curtice, who worked as an assistant director on commercials, and Larry Kostroff, who worked in the film industry in various positions including as producer of films like 1968's The Heart Is a Lonely Hunter, 1973's The Last Detail, 1982's The Year of Living Dangerously and 1983's WarGames. Noble says she spent her childhood on movie sets, growing up on location.

She has a degree in sociology.

== Career ==
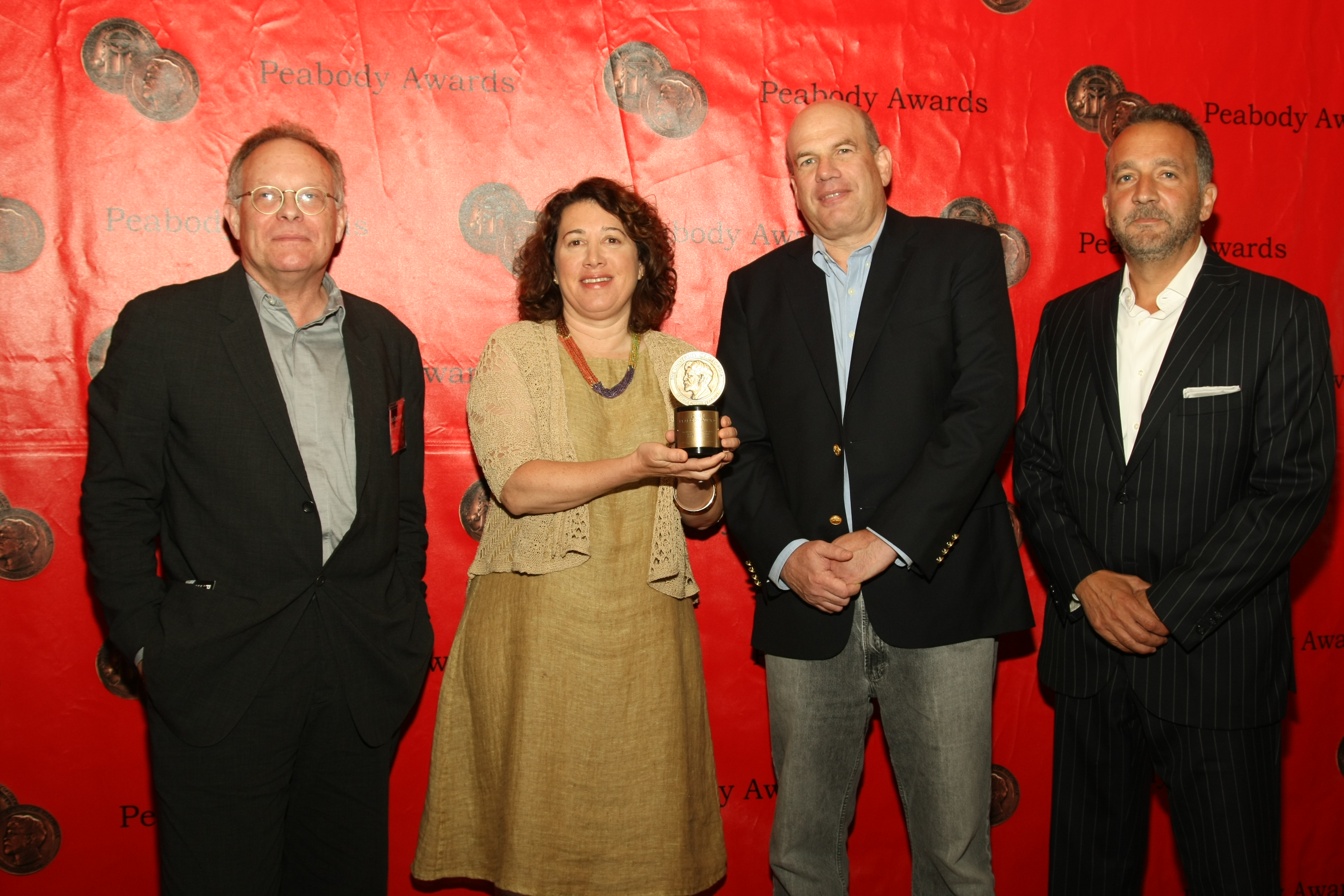
Eric Overmyer, Nina K. Noble, David Simon, and George Pelecanos with a Peabody Award, 2012

Before entering television she worked extensively in film. Initially she was a production assistant and then became a second assistant director after joining the Directors Guild of America in 1984. She worked as a freelance assistant director for ten years and worked with several notable film-makers including Alan Parker, Paul Mazursky, Ron Shelton, Stephen Frears, Paul Verhoeven and Ivan Reitman.

In 1995, Noble began producing and production managing television projects for Barry Levinson and Tom Fontana. They introduced her to writer David Simon in 1999 when he was developing his book The Corner: A Year in the Life of an Inner-City Neighborhood for the HBO network. She collaborated with Simon and Robert F. Colesberry to produce the Emmy award-winning The Corner for HBO.

Noble continued her collaboration with Simon and Colesberry on their next project The Wire. She was involved from the beginning and was credited as a producer for the show's first season. She retained her role for the show's second season and her credit was upgraded to co-executive producer. For the third and fourth season she was credited as executive producer alongside Simon. She continued in this role for the fifth and final season.

Noble has produced all of Simon's HBO series. On their collaboration: "My credibility is predicated on working with Nina," Simon says. "Nina makes us come in on budget all the time. Ask HBO how many shows they have that come in on budget."

Noble produced David Simon's mini-series, Show Me a Hero, based on the book by Lisa Belkin.

== Personal life ==
Noble is married to David Noble. She has two sons, Nick and Jason.

Noble's brother, Michael Kostroff, played defense attorney Maurice Levy on The Wire.
