= Dawn Logsdon =

Dawn Logsdon is an American documentary film director and editor. She is best known for Faubourg Tremé: the Untold Story of Black New Orleans, her first full length directorial effort.

== Early years ==
Raised in New Orleans, she attended Benjamin Franklin and McMain senior high schools before graduating from the University of California, Berkeley with a degree in philosophy. After graduation, she settled in the Bay Area to begin her career.

== Editing career ==
Logsdon edited the Academy Award-nominated documentary The Weather Underground, (directed by Sam Green), Paragraph 175, (directed by Rob Epstein and Jeffrey Friedman), and By Invitation Only (directed by Rebecca Snedeker).

== Directing career ==
Logsdon returned to live in New Orleans after the death of her father, Joseph Logsdon. As a historian, the elder Logsdon’s work focused on black New Orleans. He discovered and published the manuscript Solomon Northup: Twelve Years a Slave, the story of a free African American who was kidnapped and sold into slavery in Louisiana. Working with Donald E. Devore, he wrote Crescent City Schools, a history of public education in New Orleans. Working with Arnold Hirsch, he edited Creole New Orleans: Race and Americanization.

Those last two books had a profound impact on Dawn Logsdon and her work. Her film, Faubourg Tremé, relies on them extensively. Faubourg Tremé which was narrated, written and co-produced by Lolis Eric Elie, tells the story of a predominantly black New Orleans neighborhood that adjoins the French Quarter. Tremé became the hot bed of civil rights activity in the 1860s, a century before the more famous freedom movement of the 1960s. Though long known for its music and architecture, Logsdon realized that the untold story of the neighborhood and city was to be found in the legacy of civil rights activism that predated the Civil War. The documentary features interviews with historians, John Hope Franklin and Eric Foner, writers Kalamu ya Salaam, Brenda Marie Osbey, Keith Weldon Medley, trombonist, Glenn David Andrews, and carpenter, Irving Trevigne. The hero of the film’s history sections is Paul Trevigne the editor of The New Orleans Tribune/La Tribune de la Nouvelle Orleans, the bilingual newspaper that was the first black daily newspaper published in the United States.

It was during the summer of 2005, as Logsdon was editing the film, that the federal levees failed, flooding New Orleans, scattering its residents and threatening the to be the death knell of the city. Realizing that the post-Hurricane Katrina rebuilding effort paralleled the post-Reconstruction rebuilding of the 1860s and 1870s, Logsdon re-tooled the film the draw out those parallels.

The film debuted at the Tribeca Film Festival in 2008. It won the Golden Gate Film Award at the 2008 San Francisco International Film Festival, Best Documentary at the 2008 San Francisco Black Film Festival (and Best Documentary at the Martha's Vineyard African American Film Festival. It has its national television debut on PBS in 2009.

In 2013, Logsdon, with Stephen Silha and Eric Slade, directed the documentary film Big Joy: The Adventures of James Broughton, which explores the life of poet and filmmaker James Broughton.

In 2025, Logsdon and Faulknor directed Free for All: The Public Library a documentary film which examines the history of public libraries in the United States and the contemporary challenges they face.
