= James Broughton =

American poet and poetic filmmaker (1913–1999)

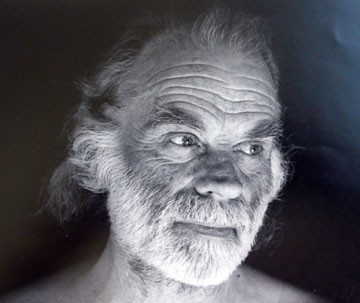
- Born: November 10, 1913; Modesto, California, U.S.
- Died: May 17, 1999 (aged 85); Port Townsend, Washington, U.S.
- Occupations: Poet, memoirist, playwright, film-maker

James Broughton (November 10, 1913 – May 17, 1999) was an American poet and poetic filmmaker. He was part of the San Francisco Renaissance, a precursor to the Beat poets. Broughton was an early bard of the Radical Faeries, as well as a member of The Sisters of Perpetual Indulgence, serving the community as Sister Sermonetta.

== Life and career ==
Broughton was born to wealthy parents in Modesto, California. His father died when he was five years old in the 1918 influenza epidemic, and he spent his childhood in San Francisco. Before he was three, "Sunny Jim" experienced a transformational visit from his muse, Hermy, which he describes in his autobiography, Coming Unbuttoned (1993):

I remember waking in the dark and hearing my parents arguing in the next room. But a more persistent sound, a kind of whirring whistle, spun a light across the ceiling. I stood up in my crib and looked into the backyard. Over a neighbor's palm tree a pulsing headlamp came whistling directly toward me. When it had whirled right up to my window, out of its radiance stepped a naked boy. He was at least three years older than I but he looked all ages at once. He had no wings, but I knew he was angel-sent: his laughing beauty illuminated the night and his melodious voice enraptured my ears…. He insisted I would always be a poet even if I tried not to be….Despite what I might hear to the contrary the world was not a miserable prison, it was a playground for a nonstop tournament between stupidity and imagination. If I followed the game sharply enough, I could be a useful spokesman for Big Joy.

Broughton was kicked out of military school for having an affair with a classmate, and attended Stanford University before dropping out just before his class graduated in 1935. In 1945, he won the Alden Award given by the Stanford Dramatists' Alliance for his original screenplay Summer Fury. He spent time in Europe during the 1950s, culminating with an award at the 1954 Cannes Film Festival from Jean Cocteau for the "poetic fantasy" of his film The Pleasure Garden, made in England with partner Kermit Sheets.

Through his career, Broughton produced 25 books and 23 films. In 1967's "summer of love", Broughton made a film, The Bed, which broke taboos against frontal nudity and won prizes at many film festivals. The film rekindled Broughton's filmmaking and led to more films, including The Golden Positions, This Is It, The Water Circle, High Kukus, and Dreamwood. Broughton's films developed a following, especially among students at the San Francisco Art Institute, where he taught film (and wrote Seeing the Light, a book about filmmaking) and artistic ritual. In 1965, Broughton collaborated with harpist Joel Andrews to produce The Bard & the Harper, an album of recited poetry and music, on Gleeman Records.

=== With Joel Singer ===
As poet Jack Foley writes in All: A James Broughton Reader, "In Broughton's moment of need, Hermy appeared again in the person of a twenty-five-year-old Canadian film student named Joel Singer... Broughton's meeting with Singer was a life-changing, life-determining moment, that animated his consciousness with a power that lasted until his death."

With Singer, Broughton traveled and made more films – Hermes Bird (1979), a slow-motion look at an erection shot with the camera developed to photograph atomic bomb explosions, The Gardener of Eden (1981), filmed when they lived in Sri Lanka, Devotions (1983), a study of male relationships, and Scattered Remains (1988), a tribute to Broughton's poetry and filmmaking.

Broughton explored death deeply throughout his life. He died in May 1999 with champagne on his lips, in the house in Port Townsend, Washington, where he and Singer had lived for 10 years. His last words were: "My creeping decrepitude has crept me all the way to the crypt." His gravestone in a Port Townsend cemetery reads, "Adventure – not predicament."

=== Personal life ===
In Coming Unbuttoned, Broughton remarks on his love affairs with both men and women. Among his male lovers was gay activist Harry Hay.

Broughton had many creative love affairs during the San Francisco Beat Scene. He briefly lived with the film critic Pauline Kael and they had a daughter, Gina, who was born in 1948. Broughton put off marriage until the age of 49, when he married Suzanna Hart in a three-day ceremony on the Pacific coast, documented by his friend, the experimental filmmaker Stan Brakhage. Hart and Broughton had two children, and built a counter-culture community along with friends including Alan Watts, Michael McClure, Anna Halprin, and Imogen Cunningham.

== Filmography ==
- The Potted Psalm (with Sidney Peterson) (1946) 18 min
- Mother's Day (1948) 22 min 16 mm
- Adventures of Jimmy (1950) 11 min 16 mm
- Four in the Afternoon (1951) 15 min 16 mm
- Loony Tom, The Happy Lover (1951) 10.5 min 16 mm
- The Pleasure Garden (1953) 38 min 35 mm
- The Bed (1968) 20 min 16 mm
- Nuptiae (1969) 14 min 16 mm
- The Golden Positions (1970) 16 mm
- This Is It (1971) 10 min 16 mm
- Dreamwood (1972) 45 min 16 mm
- High Kukus (1973) 3 min 16 mm
- Testament (1974) 20 min 16 mm
- The Water Circle (1975) 3 min 16 mm
- Together (with Joel Singer) (1976) 3 min 16 mm
- Erogeny (1976) 6 min 16 mm
- Windowmobile (with Joel Singer) (1977) 8 min 16 mm
- Song of the Godbody (with Joel Singer) (1977) 11 min 16 mm
- Hermes Bird (1979) 11 min 16 mm
- The Gardener of Eden (with Joel Singer) (1981) 8.5 min 16 mm
- Shaman Psalm (with Joel Singer) (1981) 7 min 16 mm
- Devotions (with Joel Singer) (1983) 22 min 16 mm
- Scattered Remains (with Joel Singer) (1988) 14 min 16 mm

== Bibliography ==
- Songs for Certain Children. San Francisco: Adrian Wilson. 1947.
- The Playground. San Francisco: Centaur Press. 1949.
- Musical Chairs. San Francisco: Centaur Press. 1950.
- The Ballad of Mad Jenny. San Francisco: Centaur Press. 1950.
- An Almanac for Amorists. Paris: Collection Merlin. 1955.
- True & False Unicorn. New York: Grove Press. 1957.
- The Right Playmate. San Francisco: Pearce & Bennett. 1964.
- Tidings. San Francisco: Pterodactyl Press. 1965.
- High Kukus. New York: Jargon Society. 1969.
- A Long Undressing. New York: Jargon Society. 1971.
- Erogeny: A Geographical Expedition. San Francisco: ManRoot Books. 1976.
- Seeing the Light (republished as Making Light of It, 1992 ed.). San Francisco: City Lights Books. 1977.
- Odes for Odd Occasions. San Francisco: Manroot Press. 1977.
- The Androgyne Journal. Oakland, CA: Scrimshaw Press. 1977.
- Hymns to Hermes. San Francisco: Manroot Press. 1979.
- Graffiti for the Johns of Heaven. Mill Valley, CA: Syzygy Press. 1982.
- Ecstasies. Mill Valley, CA: Syzygy Press. 1983.
- A to Z: 26 Sermonettes. Mill Valley, CA: Syzygy Press. 1986.
- Hooplas. San Francisco: Pennywhistle Press. 1988.
- 75 Life Lines. Winston-Salem, NC: Jargon Society. 1988.
- Special Deliveries: Selected Poems. Seattle, WA: Broken Moon Press. 1990.
- Coming Unbuttoned. San Francisco: City Lights Press. 1993. ISBN 978-0-87286-280-7.
- Little Sermons of the Big Joy. Philadelphia, PA: Insight to Riot Press. 1994.
- Little Prayers to Big Joy's Mother. Port Townsend, WA: Syzygy Press. 1995.
- Packing Up for Paradise: Selected Poems 1946–1996. Santa Barbara, CA and Ann Arbor, MI: Black Sparrow Press. 1997.
- Foley, Jack, ed. (2007). ALL: A James Broughton Reader. Brooklyn, NY: White Crane Books.

== Discography ==
- The Bard & The Harper (1965) with Joel Andrews: Gleeman – MEA LP 1013

== Legacy ==
Joel Singer wrote of his long relationship and collaboration with Broughton in a 2004 issue of White Crane Journal.

The Films of James Broughton, a compilation of seventeen films on three DVDs, was released in 2006 by Facets Multimedia.

All: A James Broughton Reader, an anthology edited by Jack Foley, was released in 2007 by White Crane Books.

The 2012 documentary Big Joy: the Adventures of James Broughton was directed by Stephen Silha, Eric Slade, and Dawn Logsdon, with cinematographer Ian Hinkle.
