= Faubourg Treme: The Untold Story of Black New Orleans =

2008 American documentary film

- Film poster
- Directed by: Dawn Logsdon
- Written by: Lolis Eric Elie
- Produced by: Lucie Faulknor; Dawn Logsdon; Lolis Eric Elie
- Edited by: Dawn Logsdon; Sam Green; Aljernon Tunsil
- Music by: Derrick Hodge
- Production company: Serendipity Films
- Distributed by: PBS
- Release date: April 2008
- Running time: 68 minutes
- Country: United States
- Language: English

Faubourg Tremé: The Untold Story of Black New Orleans, is a 2008 documentary film directed by Dawn Logsdon and written by Lolis Eric Elie. Featuring a cast of local musicians, artists and writers, the film relates the history of New Orleans' Tremé neighborhood.

The film details the existence of the oldest black neighborhood in America, and its significance as the origin of the southern Civil Rights Movement and birthplace of jazz.

Filmmaker Logdson and writer Elie, both New Orleans natives, began work on this project in 2000, five years before Hurricane Katrina hit. They began a process of documenting the vibrant culture of Faubourg Tremé, in the hopes of uncovering Treme's unique and hidden history. By some stroke of fate, the entirety of their tapes survived the hurricane and the flooding and devastation that followed. With renewed and deepened resolve to share their little slice of New Orleans with the world, the film was completed in 2008 and debuted at the Tribeca Film Festival that year. The film premiered on the PBS network as part of its Black History Month programming on January 29, 2009. It was described by the New Orleans Tribune as "arguably the most poignant film ever made about New Orleans" and has been compared to Spike Lee's documentary When the Levees Broke in the level of its accuracy and significance.

"Faubourg" (pronounced "foe-boorg'") is a French term that means "suburb" or neighborhood. Thus, Faubourg Tremé (pronounced "Trem-ay'") means "neighborhood Tremé." The name is synonymous with the meaning of this area as not only the oldest black neighborhood, but also as a site of economic, cultural, political and social events that have shaped the course of Black America over the last three centuries. Ironically, very few Americans are aware of the significance of this neighborhood to Americans of African descent, the civil rights movement and the jazz culture that New Orleans is so famous for.

The documentary is presented from the first hand perspective of Lolis Eric Elie, a New Orleans journalist who was a staff writer on the HBO series, Treme. Acting as a tour guide, Elie shares his city, and deep love of place, with viewers. The film combines pre-Katrina footage and images, street performances and archival material. The film is interspersed with interviews and personal accounts, including Louisiana poet Laureate Brenda Marie Osbey, historians John Hope Franklin and Eric Foner, and even the 75-year-old contractor that Elie hires to rehabilitate his old house in the Treme district following Katrina.

== Synopsis ==
The film uses interviews, live footage and archival material to tell the story of Tremé and the relevance of its context in not only Black history, but the greater American history as well.

The film follows Lolis Eric Elie and the renovation of his Tremé home following Hurricane Katrina. The progress of the renovation of Elie's home reveals the neighborhood's riveting yet neglected past and eventually emerges as an eloquent and meaningful metaphor for the general state of reconstruction post-Katrina in New Orleans.

Louisiana Poet Laureate Brenda Marie Osbey, musician Glen David Andrews, historians John Hope Franklin and Eric Foner, as well as Elie's carpenter and contractor Irving Trevigne, come together to detail the complex historical experiences of Tremé, both pre- and post-Katrina. Trevigne captures the soul of the neighborhood with his beguiling and priceless stories of forgotten Tremé buildings and historical landmarks, which sets the film apart from other such documentaries, painting a picture of New Orleans over the last two hundred years from both a personal and historical perspective.

== History ==
Before the Louisiana Purchase of 1803, which incorporated it into the United States, New Orleans was a French and Spanish city. A mixture of Latin and urban attitudes in the area resulted in a varied and relaxed perspective of slavery in comparison to those found on plantations outside of the city and in other parts of the country. It was common to see slaves walking freely throughout the city, working for themselves and even buying their own freedom. In the 1800s, New Orleans had the largest number of free people of color. As the city of New Orleans expanded over time, Tremé emerged as a blended neighborhood in which a majority of the inhabitants were free people of color. Tremé became the site of St. Augustine Church, the oldest predominantly black Catholic parish in the country, and other unique institutions and ideologies that could not be found anywhere else in the country at the time.

In 1862, northern troops took over the city and Paul Trevigne began The Tribune, the first black-owned daily newspaper in the United States. This newspaper became a triumphant and bold voice in the civil rights movement, long before any of these issues hit mainstream America. Throughout the mid-1850s, black New Orleanians held sit-ins, boycotts and marches, calling for desegregation, the right to enlist in the military, and the right to vote. When white supremacists regained control of the city in 1877, and the Ku Klux Klan ran rampant, a new, alternate, subversive kind of hope was born: jazz. According to Wynton Marsalis, who explains this perspective in the film, jazz provided a form of expression and freedom that transcended the restrictions and inequalities of American society at the time; its musical style is imbued with the resilient spirit of those original participants of the civil rights movement.

In 1892, as the film documents, Tremé resident Homer Plessy became the second most famous plaintiff in United States Supreme Court history in a case (Plessy v. Ferguson) that ultimately decided against Plessy in 1896 and established the "Separate but equal" doctrine that reinforced Jim Crow laws that prevailed legally until 1954's Brown v. Board of Education decision.

Through the 1950s and '60s, Tremé was the epicenter of civil rights struggles in New Orleans, but when many of its wealthier residents moved away, abandoning the neighborhood for the prestige of the French Quarter and other areas, inner city urban decay set in and Tremé faded into the background, referred to only as the Sixth Ward, stereotyped as just another arena of poverty, crime and drugs, with its rich history and contributions obscured. However, in August 2005, Hurricane Katrina ravaged the city of New Orleans, exposing racial inequities and a cycle of neglect that had been perpetuated for decades. It also inspired two native New Orleans filmmakers to complete their project – to follow up with the people they had met during filming pre-Katrina and give tribute to a powerful, vibrant community that has contributed to and shaped our nation's history, even in the face of violence, hostility and oppression.

== Geography and namesake ==
The neighborhood of Tremé is located within the city of New Orleans between North Rampart and North Broad, running from Canal Street to St. Bernard Avenue.

The area is named for Claude Tremé, a model hat maker and real estate developer who migrated from France and settled in New Orleans in 1783. He owned only a very small portion of the neighborhood that now bears his name.

== Points made by the film ==
Faubourg Tremé: The Untold Story of Black New Orleans explores the issues of racial inequality, economic inequity and cultural, political and social unrest that have evolved from the neighborhood of Tremé. It addresses the civil rights movement, the relevance of Tremé to African American history and its significance in the origins of jazz. Most importantly, however, the documentary film is a poignant reminder of the fact that, while we have progressed since the days of segregation, America still faces the same issues and struggles that the natives of Tremé have faced throughout the past two centuries. As Brenda Marie Osbey concludes, “This catastrophe is not greater than we as a people. Everywhere we go we must take with us the spirit of this city, the spirit of its heroes and the will to live and fight again.”

== Awards ==
- Winner Peter C. Rollins Award for Best Documentary - Popular Culture Association/American Culture Association
- Winner Best Documentary - Society for Visual Anthropology, American Anthropology Association
- Winner, Best Film about Hurricane Katrina, New Orleans Times Picayune Readers Poll
- Best Documentary - San Francisco International Film Festival, Martha's Vineyard African American Film Festival, and SF Black Film Festival
- Special Jury Award - Bermuda International Film Festival
- Best Documentary Honorable Mention - Pan African Film Festival
