= Free for All: The Public Library =

Free for All: The Public Library is a 2025 documentary film which examines the history of public libraries in the United States and the contemporary challenges they face. It was directed by Lucie Faulknor and Dawn Logsdon.
