= Michael Kostroff =

American actor (born 1961)

- Born: May 22, 1961 (age 65); New York City, U.S.
- Occupation: Actor
- Years active: 1980–present
- Relatives: Nina Kostroff Noble (sister)

Michael Kostroff (born May 22, 1961) is an American actor. He appeared on the HBO drama series The Wire as defense attorney Maurice Levy. Kostroff starred in the fifth season of the series and appeared in all four earlier seasons as a guest star.

== Life and career ==
Kostroff is best known for his five seasons playing drug lawyer Maury Levy on the HBO series The Wire, and from his recurring appearances on shows including The Blacklist, Billions, The Good Wife, and Law & Order: Special Victims Unit, as well as his role as Marshall Pike on the Disney Channel series Sonny with a Chance. He played Peter Madoff, brother of Bernie Madoff (Robert De Niro), in HBO's The Wizard of Lies, and Shepsie Tirschwell in David Simon's 2020 miniseries The Plot Against America.

From 2002 to 2003, Kostroff performed in the first national tour of Mel Brooks' Broadway hit The Producers, and from 2003 to 2004, he played the comic villain Thénardier in the touring company of Les Misérables, a role he reprised for its 25th anniversary tour in 2010.

Kostroff is the author of four books: Letters from Backstage (a chronicle of his time on the road with two Broadway tours); The Stage Actor's Handbook: Traditions, Protocols, and Etiquette for the Working and Aspiring Professional; Audition Psych 101 (based on his workshop of the same name); and Advice from 'The Working Actor' (a textbook based on the “Working Actor” advice column in the weekly publication Backstage; Kostroff was also one of the writers of that column).

He also volunteered on the Barack Obama campaign.

Kostroff is the brother of Nina Kostroff Noble, a television producer who was an executive producer of The Wire.

In September 2024, he was cast in a recurring role on the superhero series Spider-Noir.

== Filmography ==
Film
Year	Title	Role	Notes
1989	Return from the River Kwai	Radio Man	Unreleased in the US
1997	Liar Liar	Tom the Attorney	
1998	Blunt	Det. Prang	
2008	Eagle Eye	Jeweler	
2011	Hit List	Mr. Weller	
2014	Best Man in the Dark	Ricky Feruci	
2016	Norman	Steve Goldfarb	
2016	Hard Sell	Mr. Harrison	
2017	Molly's Game	Louis Butterman	
2018	Most Likely to Murder	Uncle Fred	
2019	The Sunlit Night	Critic #3	
2019	Standing Up, Falling Down	Rabbi	
2022	Pinball: The Man Who Saved the Game	Chairman Warner	
2023	Maybe I Do	Manny	
2023	Chupa	Taylor	

Television
Year	Title	Role	Notes
1980	The Dream Merchants	Brooklyn A.D.	Mini-series; 2 episodes
1992	Knots Landing	Orderly #1	Episode: "Dedicated to the One I Love"
1994	The Steven Banks Show	Pepper	Episode: "Miss Janie Regrets"
1995	Partners	Harried Man	Episode: "City Hall"
1995	General Hospital	Francis	Unknown episodes
1997–1998	NewsRadio	Carl	Episode: "Planbee"; Episode: "Who's the Boss: Part 2"
1998	Dharma & Greg	Lou	Episode: "Much Ado During Nothing"
1999	Ladies Man	Alan	Episode: "No Cinco, Seis!"
1999	Port Charles	Johnny LaLa	Unknown episodes
2000–2001	The Geena Davis Show	Mr. Kern	Episode: "Motherly Advice"; Episode: "Momma Bear"; Episode: "White Moms Can't Jump"
2001	Providence	Floral Designer	Episode: "You Can Count on Me"
2001	Men, Women & Dogs	Steve	Episode: "Sick as a Dog"
2001	Felicity	Bill	Episode: "A Perfect Match"
2001–2003	The King of Queens	Mr. Thompson	Episode: "No Retreat"; Episode: "Food Fight"; Episode: "Affidavit Justice"
2002	Malcolm in the Middle	Toadie	Episode: "Company Picnic: Part 1"; Episode: "Company Picnic: Part 2"
2002–2008	The Wire	Maurice Levy	Recurring (seasons 1-4)/main cast (season 5); 21 episodes
2004	The West Wing	Richard Squire	Episode: "A Change Is Gonna Come"
2004	8 Simple Rules	Photographer	Episode: "A Very C.J. Christmas"
2005	ER	Community Theater Director	Episode: "The Show Must Go On"
2005	The Inside	Rick Byers	Episode: "The Perfect Couple"
2005–2006	Boston Legal	N/A; Dr. David Cannon	Episode: "The Ass Fat Jungle"; uncredited Episode: "Helping Hands"
2005–2006	Veronica Mars	Mr. Pope	Episode: "Cheatty Cheatty Bang Bang"; Episode: "Nobody Puts Baby in a Corner"; Episode: "The Quick and the Wed"
2006	Charmed	Mr. Metcalf	Episode: "Payback's a Witch"; uncredited
2006	Commander in Chief	Reporter Cy	Episode: "State of the Unions"
2006	The Closer	Dr. Aaron Sands	Episode: "Heroic Measures"
2006	Studio 60 on the Sunset Strip	David Langenfeld	Episode: "Nevada Day: Part 1"; Episode: "Nevada Day: Part 2"
2007	In Case of Emergency	Mr. Hunt	Episode: "Stuck in Amber"
2007	The Wedding Bells	Milton Crest	Episode: "Partly Cloudy, with a Chance of Disaster"
2007	Life	McAllister	Episode: "A Civil War"
2008	Without a Trace	Dr. Cappell	Episode: "Hard Reset"
2008	Eli Stone	Judge Timothy Nelson	Episode: "Help!"
2008	Dan's Detour of Life	Dan Ford	Lead role; unsold pilot
2009–2010	Sonny with a Chance	Marshall Pike	Recurring role; 15 episodes
2009	Brothers & Sisters	Realtor	Episode: "From France with Love"
2010	Cold Case	Wilson Katz (1974)	Episode: "The Runaway Bunny"
2010	The Middle	Steve	Episode: "TV or Not TV"
2010	Party Down	Jeff Gold	Episode: "Jackal Onassis Backstage Party"
2010	Sons of Tucson	Mr. Shuldiner	Episode: "Chicken Pox"
2010	Weeds	Stroller Salesman	Episode: "A Yippity Sippity"
2011–2021	Law & Order: Special Victims Unit	Evan Braun	Recurring role; 8 episodes
2012	NYC 22	Brandon Ken	Episode: "Self Cleaning Oven"
2012	Damages	Judge Richard Gearheart	Recurring role; 5 episodes
2012	Made in Jersey	Hank	Episode: "Ridgewell"
2013	Blue Bloods	Mr. Wojcik	Episode: "Framed"
2013	Banshee	Wicks Vanderwick	Episode: "Wicks"
2013–2016	The Good Wife	Charles Froines	Episode: "The Bit Bucket"; Episode: "Parallel Construction, Bitches"; Episode: "All Tapped Out"; Episode: "Landing"
2014	The Actress	Dr. Hersham	Episode: "The Dermatologist"
2014	Black Box	Jacob Myers	Episode: "Jerusalem"
2014	F to 7th	Mike	Episode: "Deny, Deny, Deny"; Episode: "Down to Zero"
2014	Louie	Subway Man	Episode: "Pamela: Part 1"
2014	Gotham	Officer Tannenbaum	Episode: "Pilot"
2015	The Blacklist	Det. Martin Wilcox	Episode: "Ruslan Denisov"; Episode: "The Deer Hunter"; Episode: "The Major"; Episode: "Tom Keen"
2015	Deadbeat	Barrold Weinbergerstein	Episode: "Last Dance with Edith Jane"; Episode: "The Blowfish Job"; Episode: "The Polaroid Flasher"
2015	Elementary	Perry Franklin	Episode: "The Best Way Out Is Always Through"
2016	Bosch	Hank Myers	Episode: "Victim of the Night"
2016	Vinyl	Allen Charnitski	Episode: "E.A.B."
2016	Luke Cage	Dr. Noah Burstein	Recurring role; 4 episodes
2016	Madam Secretary	Ambassador Chuck Willis	Episode: "Tectonic Shift"
2017	The Wizard of Lies	Peter Madoff	TV movie
2017–2018	The Deuce	Rizzi	Recurring role; 8 episodes
2018	Instinct	John Raymond	Episode: "Blast from the Past"
2018	NCIS: Los Angeles	Robert Fenton	Episode: "A Diamond in the Rough"
2018	Indoor Boys	Richard	Recurring role; 3 episodes
2018–2021	Billions	Mick Nussfaur	Episode: "Hell of a Ride"; Episode: "Maximum Recreational Depth"; Episode: "Victory Smoke"
2020	Lincoln Rhyme: Hunt for the Bone Collector	Dr. Allen Trask	Episode: "Game On"
2020	The Plot Against America	Shepsie Tirchwell	Main cast; 6 episodes
2020	The Baker and the Beauty	Eli Weiss	Episode: "Get Carried Away"
2020	The George Lucas Talk Show	Himself	Episode: "Stu-D2 1138 on the Binary Sunset Sith"
2021	Prodigal Son	Dr. Raymond Stengel	Episode: "Sun and Fun"
2022	9-1-1: Lone Star	Dr. Patt	Episode: "Down to Clown"
2022	Animal Kingdom	David	2 episodes
2022	Law & Order	Evan Braun	Episode: "Gimme Shelter - Part Three"
2022	NCIS	Felix Lassiter	Episode: "Love Lost"
2023	Platonic	Frank Schaeffer	2 episodes
2023	Carol & the End of the World	Guest Performer (voice)	Episode: "The Distraction"
2024	The Rookie	Rafael	Episode: "Trouble in Paradise"
2025	Watson	William Betancourt	Episode: "Patient Question Mark"
2026	Spider-Noir	Mayor Morris	Recurring role
2026	Furious	Marty Fontenesca	2 episodes

Music video
Year	Artist	Title
2008	Demi Lovato	"La La Land"
