= Treme (TV series) =

American drama television series

- Season 1 title
- Genre: Drama
- Created by: David Simon; Eric Overmyer
- Starring: Khandi Alexander; Rob Brown; Kim Dickens; John Goodman; Michiel Huisman; Melissa Leo; Lucia Micarelli; Clarke Peters; Wendell Pierce; Steve Zahn; India Ennenga; David Morse; Jon Seda; Chris Coy
- Opening theme: "The Treme Song" by John Boutté
- Country of origin: United States
- Original language: English
- No. of seasons: 4
- No. of episodes: 36 (list of episodes)

Production
- Executive producers: David Simon; Nina Kostroff Noble; Eric Overmyer; Carolyn Strauss; James Yoshimura; George Pelecanos
- Producer: Joseph Incaprera
- Production locations: New Orleans, Louisiana
- Camera setup: Single-camera
- Running time: 58–88 minutes
- Production companies: Blown Deadline Productions; HBO Entertainment

Original release
- Network: HBO
- Release: April 11, 2010 – December 29, 2013

Treme (/trəˈmeɪ/ trə-MAY) is an American drama television series created by David Simon and Eric Overmyer that aired on HBO. The series premiered on April 11, 2010, and concluded on December 29, 2013, comprising four seasons and 36 episodes. The series features an ensemble cast including Khandi Alexander, Rob Brown, Chris Coy, Kim Dickens, India Ennenga, John Goodman, Michiel Huisman, Melissa Leo, Lucia Micarelli, David Morse, Clarke Peters, Wendell Pierce, Jon Seda, and Steve Zahn, as well as musical performances by a number of New Orleans–based artists.

The series takes its name from Tremé, a neighborhood of New Orleans. It begins three months after Hurricane Katrina as the residents, including musicians, chefs, Mardi Gras Indians, and other New Orleanians try to rebuild their lives, their homes, and their unique culture in the aftermath of the 2005 hurricane and the subsequent severe flooding of the city.

It received generally favorable reviews, particularly for its performances by the cast and musical performers, as well as for its realistic portrayal of New Orleans culture.

== Episodes ==
Season	Episodes	Originally released	
Season	Episodes	First released	Last released
1	10	April 11, 2010	June 20, 2010
2	11	April 24, 2011	July 3, 2011
3	10	September 23, 2012	November 25, 2012
4	5	December 1, 2013	December 29, 2013

== Cast and characters ==
=== Main ===
- Khandi Alexander as LaDonna Batiste-Williams – She owns and runs a tavern in New Orleans. She was formerly married to Antoine, with whom she has two sons. She commutes between New Orleans and Baton Rouge, where she lives with her sons and her current husband, Larry Williams (Lance E. Nichols), a dentist. Williams pressures her to move to Baton Rouge, as she has no ties to New Orleans anymore. She previously took care of her elderly mother, who refused to leave the city when they were trying to locate LaDonna's younger brother David Maurice (Daymo), who went missing during the storm.
- Rob Brown as Delmond Lambreaux – The son of Albert, an accomplished trumpet player. He finds himself drawn more to the music and atmosphere of New York City than New Orleans. Delmond's character is based on jazz innovator Donald Harrison Jr., whom Simon and Overmyer brought in to consult for the series.
- Kim Dickens as Janette Desautel – A struggling chef trying to keep her restaurant open while waiting for insurance to pay for her losses in the storm. Davis and she maintain a casual but tumultuous relationship.
- John Goodman (Note: Goodman was publicized as a series regular, though is credited with the main cast in home media releases of season 1 only.) as Creighton Bernette (season 1, guest star season 2) – Toni's husband, an English professor at Tulane University. He is working on a novel about the Great Mississippi Flood of 1927 and is a passionate promoter of the city's culture. His character is drawn from the real-life New Orleans blogger, Ashley Morris.
- Michiel Huisman as Sonny – A street musician from Amsterdam, he met Annie while she was backpacking in Europe. His drug use causes problems for both their professional and personal relationships.
- Melissa Leo as Antoinette "Toni" Bernette – A civil rights lawyer, she works with LaDonna in trying to locate her missing brother. She defends musicians and people abused by the justice system in the city. She is relentless in her investigation of NOPD corruption, which puts both her and her daughter's life at risk.
- Lucia Micarelli as Annie Talarico – A classically trained violinist, she plays music on the streets of the French Quarter with her boyfriend Sonny, working for tips.
- Clarke Peters as Albert "Big Chief" Lambreaux – A Mardi Gras Indian chief, he is well respected in his community. Having returned to his home to find it severely damaged, he moves into the neighborhood bar where his tribe practices. He is repairing it while working to bring the other members of his tribe, as well as his son Delmond, back to the city.
- Wendell Pierce as Antoine Batiste – A trombonist, constantly hunting for his next gig, Antoine lives with the mother of his youngest child. He rarely sees his two sons he shares with his ex-wife LaDonna, in part because he has no car since the storm and must rely on cabs and public transportation. He is the frontman for his band, Antoine Batiste and his Soul Apostles, and has a part-time job as an assistant music instructor at a local middle school.
- Steve Zahn as Davis McAlary – A volunteer DJ on local radio station WWOZ-FM and musician, Davis is from an Uptown family, but now lives in Tremé. He is a passionate lover of New Orleans and its culture. He is constantly seeking to incite social outrage against perceived injustices.
- India Ennenga as Sofia Bernette (seasons 2–4, recurring season 1) – Toni and Creighton's teenage daughter. In season three, she is repeatedly targeted by the NOPD in an effort to dissuade her mother from investigating police corruption in New Orleans.
- David Morse as Terry Colson (seasons 2–4, recurring season 1) – An honest police officer working as a shift lieutenant for the NOPD, he is a friend of Toni Bernette. He secretly works with the FBI in investigating his city's police corruption.
- Jon Seda as Nelson Hidalgo (seasons 2–4) – A politically connected developer and venture capitalist from Dallas, he becomes involved in the renewal efforts in post-Katrina New Orleans.
- Chris Coy as L.P. Everett (seasons 3–4) – A young reporter for ProPublica; new to New Orleans, he is investigating the various crimes that happened during Hurricane Katrina. The character is based on real-life reporter A. C. Thompson.

=== Recurring ===
- Lance E. Nichols as Larry Williams – LaDonna's husband and a dentist based in Baton Rouge. He strongly urges LaDonna to move to Baton Rouge, after selling her bar and her mother's house in New Orleans, so she can live full-time with her sons and him.
- Phyllis Montana LeBlanc as Desiree – Antoine's strong-minded girlfriend and mother of his youngest child. She fights against eminent domain.
- Ntare Guma Mbaho Mwine as Jacques Jhoni – Janette's loyal sous chef. He faces some immigration problems and becomes romantically involved with Janette.
- Davi Jay as Robinette – A refuse hauler who becomes affiliated with Nelson Hidalgo and assists with his demolition projects.
- Elizabeth Ashley as Aunt Mimi – Davis' flamboyant favorite aunt. Though they are close, they begin to quarrel when they start a record company together.
- Edwina Findley as Davina Lambreaux – Albert's daughter and Delmond's sister.
- Rio Hackford as Toby – a record store owner and old high school friend of Davis.
- Steve Earle as Harley Wyatt (seasons 1–2) – A talented street musician who mentors Annie Tee.
- David Chang as himself (seasons 1–3) – A prominent restaurateur in New York City.
- Dan Ziskie as C.J. Ligouri (seasons 2–4) – A banker who finances many of New Orleans' reconstruction projects. He acts as Hidalgo's supervisor in season two. In season three, he realizes his ignorance on the sensibilities of New Orleans jazz and poor communities such as Treme. He hires Delmond and Albert to consult with his firm on what kind of projects will please Treme's disenfranchised.
- Michael Cerveris as Marvin Frey (seasons 2–4) – Annie's music manager.
- Hong Chau as Linh (seasons 2–4) – Sonny's Vietnamese girlfriend whom he marries at the end of season three.
- Jaron Williams as Robert (seasons 2–4) – A student in Antoine's class.
- Sam Robards as Tim Feeny (seasons 3–4) – A restaurateur and Janette's partner for her new restaurant.
- Taryn Terrell as Cindy (season 3) – a friend of Nelson Hidalgo.

== Production ==
=== Conception ===
David Simon and Eric Overmyer first worked together as writers on the television series Homicide: Life on the Street and became friends. They collaborated again on Simon's series The Wire when Overmyer joined the crew as a consulting producer and writer in 2006. Treme was put into development by HBO in 2008 shortly after the conclusion of The Wire. The show was to focus on the working-class Tremé neighborhood in the aftermath of Hurricane Katrina, and is smaller in scope than The Wire, which examined an entire city.

Overmyer lived part-time in New Orleans and Simon believed his experience would be valuable in navigating the "ornate oral tradition" of the city's stories. Simon stated the series would explore New Orleans culture including and beyond the music scene to encompass political corruption, the public housing controversy, the criminal-justice system, clashes between police and Mardi Gras Indians, and the struggle to regain the tourism industry after the storm. Simon also consulted with New Orleans musicians Donald Harrison Jr., Kermit Ruffins, and Davis Rogan, local chef Susan Spicer, and civil-rights attorney Mary Howell while developing the series.

=== Development ===
In 2008, HBO commissioned a pilot episode for the series, but did not "green-light" a complete series at that time. The pilot was announced at the 2008 Television Critics Association summer press tour. Simon initially hoped to film the pilot episode of the series in 2008 and to continue filming in 2009 if the series was commissioned. The series was planned to film on location and was predicted to be a boost to the New Orleans economy.

The pilot did not actually begin filming in New Orleans until March 9, 2009. Award-winning Polish director Agnieszka Holland was hired to direct the pilot. Holland had worked with the creators previously on The Wire, directing three episodes of that series. After the Treme pilot was written, HBO commissioned another 10 scripts.

=== Crew ===
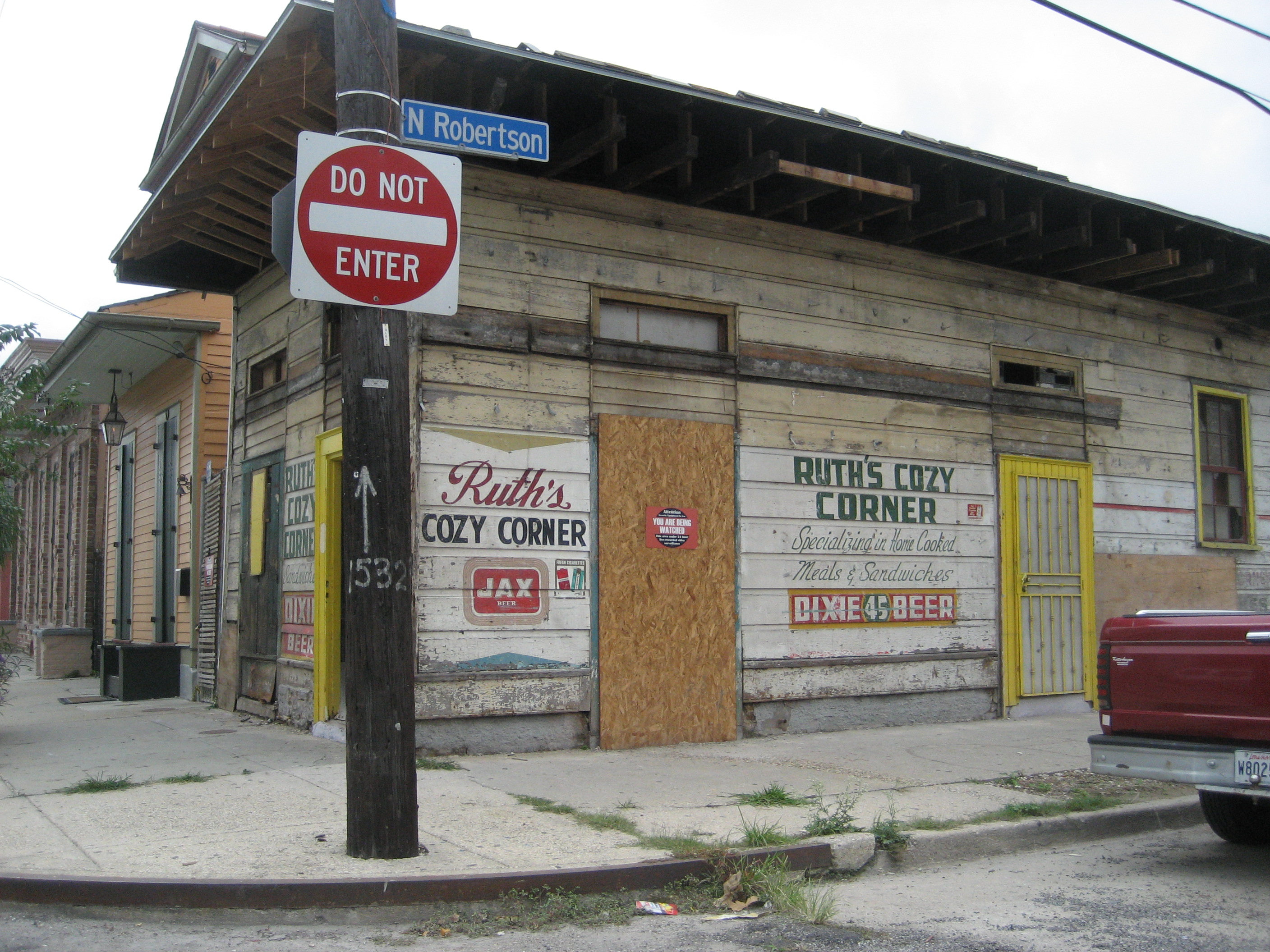
A scene from the Tremé part of New Orleans

Simon is a veteran of HBO having developed The Corner, The Wire, and Generation Kill with them, and is the showrunner and an executive producer. Overmyer is an experienced playwright, television writer/producer, executive producer, and writer. Simon and Overmyer previously collaborated on Homicide: Life on the Street and The Wire.

Simon and Overmyer began to assemble a writing staff for the full series, first hiring local writer Tom Piazza, author of the nonfiction book Why New Orleans Matters. Piazza and Overmyer had known one another for years and Simon had read and enjoyed Piazza's work. They also hired Times-Picayune reporter Lolis Eric Elie. Simon, himself a reporter before working in television, has been impressed with his expansive knowledge of local people and background. Elie was the writer of the documentary Faubourg Tremé: The Untold Story of Black New Orleans. Novelist George Pelecanos is also on board as part of the writing staff. Pelecanos was a writer on all five seasons of The Wire.

Simon also brought fellow reporter-turned-television-collaborator David Mills in for the project as co-executive producer and writer. Mills was a music enthusiast who had worked with Overmyer and Simon on both Homicide: Life on the Street and The Wire, as well as co-writing The Corner, the award-winning HBO miniseries, with Simon. The collaboration between Simon and Mills first began when both were journalists for the University of Maryland's student newspaper, The Diamondback. On March 30, 2010, David Mills died suddenly in New Orleans, 12 days before the show's premiere.

Blake Leyh is the music supervisor for the show. He has worked on numerous other projects including HBO's The Wire. Skip Bolen is the unit stills photographer for the pilot episode. He has worked on projects including HBO's season finale of True Blood.

=== Casting ===
The Wire star Wendell Pierce was the first acclaimed star to join the series. His involvement was announced shortly after the pilot was commissioned in July 2008. Pierce is a New Orleans native and plays Antoine Batiste, an accomplished trombonist. Fellow The Wire alumnus Clarke Peters was also attached to star in the project early in its development. Peters plays Albert Lambreaux, the leader of a Mardi Gras Indian tribe who is trying to bring his scattered people home and revitalize the neighborhood. Khandi Alexander, who previously worked with Simon on The Corner, joined the project in August 2008 and was cast as Ladonna Batiste-Williams, the ex-wife of Pierce's character and a bar owner.

Film actor Steve Zahn joined the project in February 2009. Treme is his first series commitment in television. Zahn plays Davis McAlary, a radio disc jockey and band member/leader in a role that showcases his singing and guitar-playing talents. Zahn's character is based on series consultant Davis Rogan and shares his first name. Kim Dickens, previously of Deadwood and Friday Night Lights, was also cast in February 2009 as a chef with a tumultuous relationship with Zahn's character.

Rob Brown was cast in February 2009 as Delmond Lambreaux, a New York jazz musician and son of Peters' character, who reluctantly returns home after Katrina. Academy Award-winner and former Homicide star Melissa Leo was cast as a civil rights lawyer just before the pilot began filming in March 2009. John Goodman was cast as her character's college professor husband when the show started filming its season order, and scenes featuring him were added to the pilot.

The casting of the series is similar to that of The Wire in that local actors are used wherever possible. Local casting took place for the first season in January and February 2009 and continued for season two through April 2011 via RPM Casting. New Orleans native Phyllis Montana LeBlanc was cast as the girlfriend of Pierce's character. LeBlanc was recommended for the project by director Spike Lee, who had worked with her on the HBO Hurricane Katrina documentary When the Levees Broke. Additionally, well-known New Orleans musician Kermit Ruffins appears as himself in the pilot and guests throughout the series.

Other musical guests include Soul Rebels Brass Band, Allen Toussaint, Dr. John, Elvis Costello, Steve Earle, Donald Harrison Jr., Galactic, Troy "Trombone Shorty" Andrews, Deacon John Moore, Big Freedia, Rebirth Brass Band, Treme Brass Band, Shawn Colvin, Spider Stacy, Eyehategod, Katey Red, Clarence "Frogman" Henry, Justin Townes Earle, Sammie "Big Sam" Williams, Aurora Nealand, Jon Batiste, The Pine Leaf Boys, Paul Sanchez, Jon Cleary, Fats Domino, Red Stick Ramblers, Free Agents Brass Band, saxophonist Joe Braun, bassist Matt Perrine, bassist Ron Carter, The Pfister Sisters (Holley Bendtsen, Debbie Davis and Yvette Voelker), clarinetist Bruce Brachman, bass drummer "Uncle" Lionel Batiste, percussionist Alfred "Uganda" Roberts, vocalist John Boutté, singer/guitarist Coco Robicheaux, pianist Tom McDermott, vocalists Lloyd Price and Irma Thomas and fiddler/accordionist Cedric Watson. Hundreds more New Orleanians have appeared in background roles throughout the series.

=== Opening credits ===

The Treme title card evolves with each season, to evoke the recovery of New Orleans. The season two title card (top image) appears against a molded backdrop and in season four (bottom image) it appears on a newly painted plastered white wall.

The opening credits, set to John Boutte's "The Treme Song", were designed by producer Karen L. Thorson, who previously developed the opening credit sequences for The Wire. The opening credits evolve and change with every season, showcasing the events that happened during that time period and themes of that season. All the actors' names are set against molded walls or other imagery associated with their characters, as no one wanted to put their names against real old photographs. Consistent throughout all the credits are images of New Orleans culture, including second line parades, Mardi Gras Indians, music, and food.

The first-season opening credits were designed "to show what has been lost", including "the culture, the music, the people". The sequence features more than 80 elements used from film, video, and still photographs, all used from people who lived in New Orleans, including family images from the hurricane. The title card appears against a molded flood-damaged backdrop.

The second-season opening credits evolve, showing more contemporary video and updated themes that are present in the season, including public housing residents protesting, crime scenes, and the beginning of rebuilding the city. The title card for season two shows more mold growing over the logo.

The third-season opening credits begin showing the revival of the city and the rebuilding, as well as new events from 2007 to 2008, in which the season takes place, including the killing of NOPD officer Nicola Cotton and the NOAH scandal. The title card evolves, evoking the themes of third season, and shows it being replastered over the mold of the previous seasons.

The fourth-season opening credits show post-Katrina recovery and imagery of Barack Obama being elected as president. These credits feature more footage and images of joyous New Orleans occasions and touchstones, as Thorson did that as a "thank you" to the city. The final title card appears newly painted on a white plastered wall, on which actor Clarke Peters provided the hand-brushed finishing touches.

== Reception ==
=== Critical response ===
Reception by television critics has been very positive. For the first season, the review aggregator website Rotten Tomatoes reported a 98% approval rating based on 40 critic reviews. The website's critics consensus reads, "Treme's spicy mix of interesting characters, great music, dense plotting, and a unique milieu make for one of the most original shows on television." Metacritic, which uses a weighted average, assigned a score of 88 out of 100 based on 32 critics, indicating "universal acclaim". For the second season, Rotten Tomatoes reported a 100% approval rating based on 24 critic reviews. The website's critics consensus reads, "Ambitious, dense, and terrifically acted, Treme deepens in its second season while retaining the regional flavor that made it so intriguing to begin with." Metacritic assigned a score of 84 out of 100 based on 17 critics, indicating "universal acclaim".

For the third season, Rotten Tomatoes reported a 100% approval rating based on 13 critic reviews. The website's critics consensus reads, "A dense, skillful portrait of a city, season three of Treme stays focused on the fiercely loyal characters who must rebuild their community to survive long after the news cycle has ended." Metacritic assigned a score of 77 out of 100 based on 4 critics, indicating "generally favorable reviews". For the fourth season, Rotten Tomatoes reported a 90% approval rating based on 20 critic reviews. The website's critics consensus reads, "Treme is a well-executed, high quality drama that boasts naturalism in its performances and atmosphere, along with a toe-tapping soundtrack." Metacritic assigned a score of 80 out of 100 based on 10 critics, indicating "generally favorable reviews".

The New York Times critic Alessandra Stanley viewed the series as a sign of the city's inextinguishable joie de vivre. Salon's Heather Havrilesky remarked that Treme "epitomizes the sort of great storytelling we all thirst for on TV but rarely find."

=== Local response ===
New Orleanians waited cautiously for the series premiere of Treme, but quickly embraced the show as an accurate and honest representation of the city. The Times-Picayune writer Dave Walker expressed the city's collective sentiment that Treme is "the screen depiction that New Orleans deserves, has always desired, but has been denied." While Simon attempted to recreate post-Katrina New Orleans with precision, he did confess a willingness to include subtle anachronisms such as the inclusion of a Hubig's pie in the first episode when such pies were still unavailable.

Simon prefaced the airing of the first episode with a letter in The Times-Picayune promising not perfect historical accuracy but a treatment "respectful of the historical reality." Treme includes many location-specific references, as did Simon's The Wire. In response, The Times-Picayune published a weekly debriefing of each episode's unexplained New Orleans references called "Treme Explained".

Adolph L. Reed Jr., a professor of political science at University of Pennsylvania raised in New Orleans, criticized the series for its clichéd portrayal of the city and the issues around Katrina, contending that Simon's "brilliant" sense of the effects of deindustrialisation was undercut by the incoherence of his analysis of the root causes, namely neoliberalism. Reed Jr. charged Simon with accepting uncritically a view of the New Orleans working classes as "culturally authentic", a narrative he deemed ultimately touristic: "The dramatic imagery of the stranded and displaced, and the apparent urgency of the moment, overwhelmed capacity for sober reflection or interrogation of the pietistic declarations. Analogies to clearer, explicit forms of racial oppression like slavery or Jim Crow segregation commonly stood in for examinations of causes of manifest inequalities and strategic responses to them."

=== Accolades ===
For the 62nd Primetime Emmy Awards, Agnieszka Holland was nominated for Outstanding Directing for a Drama Series for the pilot episode, "Do You Know What It Means", and Steve Earle was nominated for Outstanding Original Music and Lyrics for the song "This City". For the 66th Primetime Emmy Awards, for its shortened fourth and final season, it received nominations for Outstanding Miniseries; Outstanding Casting for a Miniseries, Movie or a Special; and Outstanding Writing for a Miniseries, Movie or a Dramatic Special for the series finale episode written by Simon and Overmyer; and won for Outstanding Sound Mixing for a Miniseries or a Movie.

For the 53rd Annual Grammy Awards, the season-one soundtrack was nominated for Best Compilation Soundtrack Album for a Motion Picture, Television, or other Visual Media, and the song "This City" by Steve Earle, was nominated for Best Song Written for Motion Picture, Television or Other Visual Media.

The series was awarded with a 2011 Peabody Award.

Award	Year (Note: The listed year refers to the date of the ceremony, not necessarily the year in which the corresponding season or episode aired.)	Category	Nominee(s)	Result	Ref.
Artios Awards	2010	Outstanding Achievement in Casting - Television Pilot - Drama	Alexa L. Fogel	Nominated	
Artios Awards	2015	Outstanding Achievement in Casting - Television Movie or Mini Series	Alexa L. Fogel, Meagan Lewis (Location Casting), Christine Kromer (Associate)	Nominated	
Costume Designers Guild Awards	2011	Outstanding Contemporary Television Series	Alonzo Wilson	Nominated	
Costume Designers Guild Awards	2013	Outstanding Contemporary Television Series	Alonzo Wilson & Ann Walters	Nominated	
Eddie Awards	2011	Best Edited One Hour Series for Non-Commercial Television	Kate Sanford & Alexander Hall (for "Do You Know What it Means")	Won	
Gold Derby Awards	2010	Drama Supporting Actress	Khandi Alexander	Nominated	
Grammy Awards	2011	Best Compilation Soundtrack Album for Motion Picture, Television or Other Visual Media	Blake Leyh & Tony Seyler, Producers	Nominated	
Grammy Awards	2011	Best Song Written for Motion Picture, Television or Other Visual Media	Steve Earle (for "This City")	Nominated	
Guild of Music Supervisors Awards	2013	Best Music Supervision – Scripted Drama	Blake Leyh	Nominated	
Imagen Awards	2013	Best Supporting Actor/Television	Jon Seda	Nominated	
NAACP Image Awards	2011	Outstanding Drama Series	Treme	Nominated	
NAACP Image Awards	2012	Outstanding Drama Series	Treme	Nominated	
NAACP Image Awards	2012	Outstanding Actor in a Drama Series	Wendell Pierce	Nominated	
NAACP Image Awards	2012	Outstanding Actress in a Drama Series	Khandi Alexander	Nominated	
NAACP Image Awards	2012	Outstanding Directing in a Dramatic Series	Ernest Dickerson (for "Treme: Do Watcha Wanna")	Won	
NAACP Image Awards	2012	Outstanding Writing in a Dramatic Series	Lolis Eric Elie & Eric Overmyer (for "Santa Claus, Do You Ever Get the Blues?")	Won	
NAACP Image Awards	2013	Outstanding Drama Series	Treme	Nominated	
NAACP Image Awards	2013	Outstanding Actor in a Drama Series	Wendell Pierce	Nominated	
NAACP Image Awards	2013	Outstanding Actress in a Drama Series	Khandi Alexander	Nominated	
NAACP Image Awards	2013	Outstanding Supporting Actor in a Drama Series	Clarke Peters	Nominated	
NAACP Image Awards	2013	Outstanding Directing in a Drama Series	Ernest Dickerson (for "Don't You Leave Me Here")	Nominated	
NAACP Image Awards	2014	Outstanding Drama Series	Treme	Nominated	
NAACP Image Awards	2014	Outstanding Actor in a Drama Series	Wendell Pierce	Nominated	
NAACP Image Awards	2014	Outstanding Actress in a Drama Series	Khandi Alexander	Nominated	
NAACP Image Awards	2014	Outstanding Directing in a Dramatic Series	Ernest Dickerson (for "Dippermouth Blues")	Nominated	
NAMIC Vision Awards	2011	Best Performance - Drama	Khandi Alexander	Won	
NAMIC Vision Awards	2011	Best Performance - Drama	Wendell Pierce	Nominated	
NAMIC Vision Awards	2012	Drama	Treme	Nominated	
NAMIC Vision Awards	2013	Drama	Treme	Nominated	
NAMIC Vision Awards	2014	Drama	Treme	Nominated	
NAMIC Vision Awards	2014	Best Performance - Drama	Khandi Alexander	Nominated	
Online Film & Television Association Awards	2010	Best Supporting Actor In A Drama Series	John Goodman	Nominated	
Online Film & Television Association Awards	2010	Best Supporting Actress In A Drama Series	Khandi Alexander	Nominated	
Online Film & Television Association Awards	2010	Best Ensemble In A Drama Series	Treme	Nominated	
Online Film & Television Association Awards	2010	Best Direction In A Drama Series	Treme	Nominated	
Online Film & Television Association Awards	2010	Best Writing In A Drama Series	Treme	Nominated	
Online Film & Television Association Awards	2010	Best Music In A Series	Treme	Nominated	
Online Film & Television Association Awards	2010	Best Cinematography In A Series	Treme	Nominated	
Online Film & Television Association Awards	2010	Best Production Design In A Series	Treme	Nominated	
Online Film & Television Association Awards	2011	Best Supporting Actress In A Drama Series	Khandi Alexander	Nominated	
Online Film & Television Association Awards	2011	Best Music In A Series	Treme	Nominated	
Peabody Awards	2011	George Foster Peabody Award	Blown Deadline Productions in association with HBO Entertainment	Won	
Primetime Emmy Awards	2010	Outstanding Directing for a Drama Series	Agnieszka Holland (for "Do You Know What It Means")	Nominated	
Primetime Emmy Awards	2010	Outstanding Original Music and Lyrics	Steve Earle (For The Song "This City", Episode "I'll Fly Away")	Nominated	
Primetime Emmy Awards	2014	Outstanding Casting for a Miniseries, Movie, or Special	Alexa L. Fogel & Meagan Lewis	Nominated	
Primetime Emmy Awards	2014	Outstanding Miniseries	David Simon, Nina Kostroff Noble, Eric Overmyer, George Pelecanos, Carolyn Strauss & Joseph Incaprera	Nominated	
Primetime Emmy Awards	2014	Outstanding Sound Mixing for a Miniseries or Movie	Bruce Litecky, Andy Kris & Blake Leyh (For "...Sunset on Louisianne")	Won	
Primetime Emmy Awards	2014	Outstanding Writing for a Miniseries, Movie, or Dramatic Special	David Simon & Eric Overmyer (For "...To Miss New Orleans")	Nominated	
Satellite Awards	2011	Best Drama Series	Treme	Nominated	
Satellite Awards	2011	Best Actor in a Drama Series	Wendell Pierce	Nominated	
Writers Guild of America Awards	2011	New Series	Lolis Eric Elie, David Mills, Eric Overmyer, George Pelecanos, Tom Piazza, Davis Rogan, David Simon	Nominated	

== Home media ==
=== DVD and Blu-ray ===
The first season of Treme was released on DVD and Blu-ray in region 1 on March 29, 2011, in region 2 on May 30, 2011, and in region 4 on March 30, 2011. The extras include two documentaries—"The Making of Treme" and "Treme: Beyond Bourbon Street", as well as "The Music of Treme", a text-only feature displaying the song information during the episodes. The Blu-ray includes the same extras plus an exclusive featurette, "Down in the Treme: A Look at the Music and Culture of New Orleans", another text-only feature displaying information about the music, slang, locations, and characters.

The sets also include five commentary tracks—"Do You Know What It Means" with co-creators/executive producers David Simon and Eric Overmyer; "Right Place, Wrong Time" with Wendell Pierce, Khandi Alexander, and TV critic Alan Sepinwall; "All on a Mardi Gras Day" with Overmyer and producer/director Anthony Hemingway; "Wish Someone Would Care" with producer/writer George Pelecanos and John Goodman; and "I'll Fly Away" with Simon and executive producer Nina Kostroff Noble. Scene-specific commentaries for all music sections in each episode are done by WWOZ FM-90.7 alum Josh Jackson and Patrick Jarenwattananon, who wrote analyses of Treme's music on NPR.org.

The second season was released on DVD and Blu-ray in region 1 on April 17, 2012, in region 2 on May 28, 2012, and in region 4 on April 4, 2012. Extras include three featurettes–"The Art of Treme", "Behind Treme: Food for Thought", and "Behind Treme: Clarke Peters and the Mardi Gras Indians, as well as "The Music of Treme, a text-only feature displaying the song information during the episodes. Exclusive to the Blu-ray release is "Down in the Treme: A Look at the Music and Culture of New Orleans", another text-only feature displaying information about the music, slang, locations, and characters.

The sets also include four commentary tracks–"Accentuate the Positive" with director Anthony Hemingway, and actors Kim Dickens and Lucia Micarelli; "Carnival Time" with director Brad Anderson and music supervisor Blake Leyh; "What Is New Orleans?" with writer George Pelecanos and actors Clarke Peters and Rob Brown; and "Do Whatcha Wanna" with creator David Simon, executive producer Nina Kostroff Noble, and actor Wendell Pierce. Like the previous-season release, scene-specific commentaries for all music sections in each episode are done by WBGO's Josh Jackson and NPR Music's Patrick Jarenwattananon.

The third season was released on DVD and Blu-ray in region 1 on November 19, 2013, in region 2 on September 30, 2013, and in region 4 on October 23, 2013. Extras include three featurettes–"Behind Treme: Chef Dinner", "Behind Treme: Neville Brothers", and "Behind Treme: David Simon". Exclusive to the Blu-ray release is "The Music of Treme, a text-only feature displaying the song information during the episodes and "Down in the Treme: A Look at the Music and Culture of New Orleans", another text-only feature displaying information about the music, slang, locations, and characters. The sets also include five audio commentary tracks and scene-specific commentaries for all music sections in each episode by WBGO's Josh Jackson and NPR Music's Patrick Jarenwattananon.

The fourth season was released on DVD and Blu-ray in region 1 on January 28, 2014. Extras include two audio commentaries, for "Yes We Can Can" with creator David Simon and writer George Pelecanos, and for "To Miss New Orleans" with Simon, executive producer Nina Noble and actor Clarke Peters. A complete series Blu-ray box set was also released on January 28, 2014, containing all the episodes and special features from the individual season releases and a bonus disc containing 71 minutes of musical performances featured in the series.

=== Soundtrack ===
Treme: Music From the HBO Original Series, Season 1 was released by Geffen Records on September 28, 2010. The soundtrack includes 19 songs featured in the first season by several jazz artists who appeared on the show, as well as songs performed by cast members. The soundtrack received two Grammy nominations, for Best Compilation Soundtrack Album for Motion Picture, Television or Other Visual Media and for "This City" by Steve Earle as Best Song Written For Motion Picture, Television Or Other Visual Media. A second soundtrack, featuring 18 songs in the second season was released on April 17, 2012.
