= Big Joy: The Adventures of James Broughton =

- Directed by: Stephen Silha; Eric Slade; Dawn Logsdon
- Produced by: Stephen Silha; Eric Slade
- Cinematography: Ian Hinkle; Art Adams
- Edited by: Dawn Logsdon; Bill Weber; Kyung Lee
- Music by: Jami Sieber; Evan Schiller
- Production company: Frisky Divinity Productions
- Release date: 2013
- Running time: 82 minutes
- Country: United States
- Language: English

Big Joy: The Adventures of James Broughton is a 2013 documentary film which explores the life of poet and filmmaker James Broughton. It was directed by Stephen Silha, Eric Slade, and Dawn Logsdon.
