= Lolis Elie =

American lawyer (1930–2017)

Lolis Edward Elie (January 9, 1930 – April 4, 2017) was an American lawyer from New Orleans who was very active in the Civil Rights Movement.

== Early life and education ==
In 1951, Elie was drafted into the army, where he planned to become a lawyer if he got out alive. Two years later, in 1953, Elie traveled to Washington D.C., where he attended Howard University. He was able to attend undergraduate classes through the GI Bill's benefits and subsidies because he had served in the army before. He then transferred to Dillard University in order to complete his undergraduate degree and received his law degree from Loyola University of New Orleans in 1959. Prior to his career as a lawyer, however, Elie worked by shining shoes and waiting tables for money, which he used to pay for tuition at Loyola.

== Early career ==
Shortly after graduating, Elie began to defend and speak for the rights of individuals who had been arrested with lower-level felonies, but he soon decided to focus on the Civil Rights Movement. He supported civil rights organizations and movements, collaborating with his law classmate Nils Douglas, who was the only other African American in the graduating class of 1959 at Loyola, and his colleague Robert "Bob" Collins to create a legal practice together. Elie's career lasted about four decades, with prominent cases of his including the Lombard v. Louisiana case, which was heard in the United States Supreme Court.

== Prominent cases ==
The Lombard v. Louisiana case began because of a boycott on Dryades Street in New Orleans. There, boycotters agreed to picket outside the stores on the street for their cause, to eliminate segregation. African Americans were the main clientele of these stores, but recruiters refused to hire them. About ninety percent of the business the shops profited from on Dryades was from African Americans, resulting in the protest that was backed by lawyer Elie outside of the stores. This boycott was the preliminary demonstration for the Canal Street sit-in at McCrory's lunch counter.

Oretha Castle Haley, Leonard Goldfinch, Cecil Carter, and Rudy Lombard led the sit-in protest in 1960 at the lunch counter in McCrory's Five and Ten Cent Store. Part of the Congress of Racial Equality (CORE), they were attempting to combat the segregation of whites and blacks, with Lombard as the local president of the organization. The sit-in resulted in all four being apprehended because of New Orleans' decision to prohibit sit-ins. After being arrested, CORE requested Elie and his practice to represent them in court. The case was eventually brought to the United States Supreme Court, where Lombard v. Louisiana occurred. The final court decision determined that laws banning sit-ins were unconstitutional, siding with Elie and his firm.

== Additional work ==
On top of supporting boycotts in New Orleans, Elie also participated in organizing and assigning lawyers to cases regarding the Freedom Riders. He represented CORE for multiple years in both Louisiana and parts of Mississippi. Later, in 1961, Elie, along with six other Freedom Rider supporters, spoke with Attorney General Robert F. Kennedy. Kennedy told them to shift their efforts away from the rides and instead to focus on a different cause.

== Legacy ==
Elie is credited as a major force in the fight to desegregate New Orleans, handling many significant cases in the local process.

== Personal life ==
Elie was Catholic, and buried in a Catholic funeral at St Augustine Catholic Church.

His son is writer, documentary filmmaker, and food historian Lolis Eric Elie, and his daughter Migel Elizabeth Elie was a medical doctor.
