= Ashley Morris (blogger) =

American academic and blogger

Hinton Ashley Morris (October 20, 1963 – April 2, 2008) was an American cultural and political blogger and a professor of computer science at DePaul University in Chicago. He was a prolific blogger, commenting on New Orleans culture and politics, often critical of the status quo. He became popular through a series of post-Katrina blog posts that dealt with the destruction caused by the hurricane and the efforts to rebuild New Orleans. One post in particular, entitled "Fuck You You Fucking Fucks" earned Morris a great deal of notoriety and inspired an "FYYFF" T-shirt.

Morris was an accomplished musician, playing guitar, bass, keyboards, and percussion. He was a member of the Sky Ryders Drum & Bugle Corps. As a melodic percussionist in the University of Southern Mississippi's "Pride of Mississippi" marching band in the early 1980s, he earned the nickname "Knife" by attaching some of his homemade fiberglass tom-toms to his xylophone and periodically striking them with his wooden mallets. Band director Kelley Love quickly called a halt to practice and demanded to know "what that noise was." Love said it sounded "like a knife in the night."

In the 1990s, Morris contacted musician Warren Zevon and volunteered to develop a website for him. Zevon accepted the offer. Morris' version of the website was Zevon's first, and remained up for several years. Morris was also known for being a fan of Billy Idol and The Smithereens.

Morris was a very big fan of David Simon and The Wire and wrote a blog, along with Ray Shea, devoted to the show. Simon learned of Morris' writings on The Wire and of his writings on New Orleans while Morris was still alive, and has called Morris "a very passionate, very blunt, very funny, but very honest voice about the anger and the isolation that the people in New Orleans felt." Simon later used Morris as the inspiration for the character Creighton Bernette, an English professor and blogger played by John Goodman, in his series Treme, even quoting Morris' blog for some of Goodman's dialogue.

Morris, a native of DeFuniak Springs, Florida, died of a heart attack on April 2, 2008 while in Florida settling some minor legal issues.
