= Eric Overmyer =

American writer and producer (1951–2026)

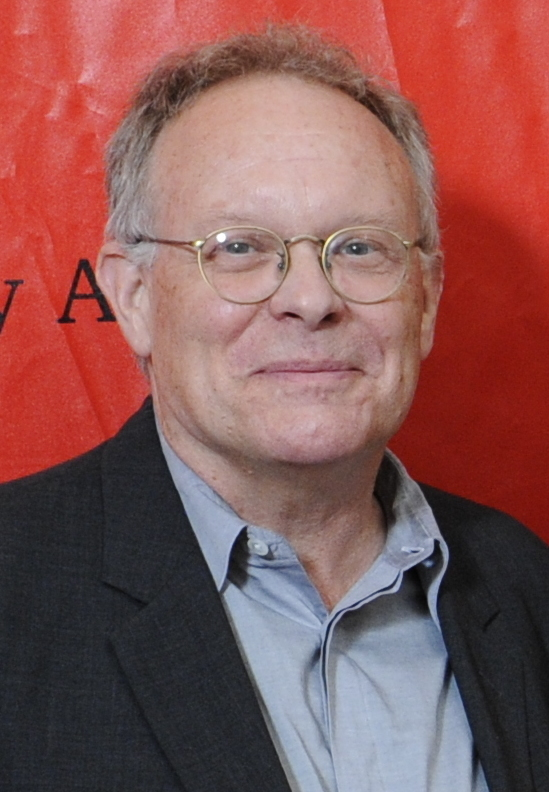
- Overmyer at the 71st Annual Peabody Awards
- Born: Eric Ellis Overmyer; September 25, 1951; Boulder, Colorado, U.S.
- Died: March 16, 2026 (aged 74); Mount Vernon, New York, U.S.
- Occupations: Writer; television producer
- Spouse: Ellen McElduff

Eric Ellis Overmyer (September 25, 1951 – March 16, 2026) was an American writer and producer. He wrote and/or produced numerous television shows, including St. Elsewhere, Homicide: Life on the Street, Law & Order, The Wire, New Amsterdam, Bosch, Treme, and The Man in the High Castle.

== Life and career ==
Overmyer was born in Boulder, Colorado, on September 25, 1951, and grew up in Seattle. He graduated as a theater major from Reed College in 1973. He credited his time at the college with helping him find and claim his identity as a writer.

He wrote for the NBC crime drama Homicide: Life on the Street from 1996 to 1999. He joined the crew as a writer for the fourth season. He became a consulting producer for the sixth season in fall 1997. He returned as a supervising producer for the seventh and final season in fall 1998. The series was based on the book Homicide: A Year on the Killing Streets by David Simon. Simon also worked as a writer and producer on the later seasons on the show and the two became friends.

Overmyer joined the crew of Law & Order as a consulting producer and writer for the twelfth season in 2001. He became a co-executive producer for the later part of the season. He remained in this role until he was promoted to executive producer for the fifteenth season in fall 2004. He left the show after the conclusion of the fifteenth season.

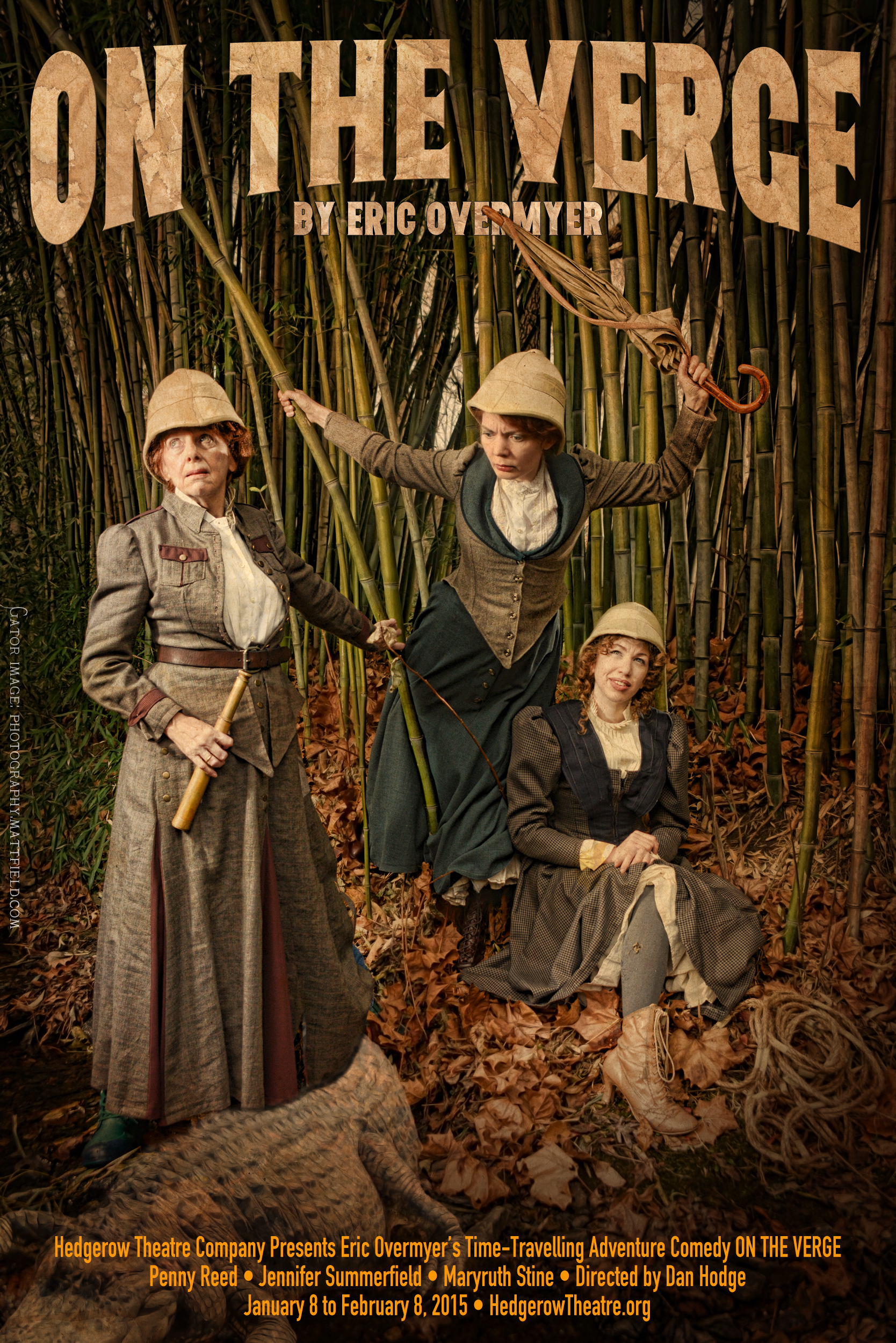
Poster for a Hedgerow Theatre Company production of On the Verge, by Eric Overmyer

He joined the crew of The Wire as a consulting producer and writer for the fourth season in 2006. Overmyer wrote the teleplays for the episodes "Margin of Error" and "Misgivings". from stories he co-wrote with producer Ed Burns. Overmyer was hired to replace George Pelecanos as a full-time writer and producer. Simon has said that he was impressed with Overmyer's writing, particularly in synthesising the story for "Margin of Error" as the episode is the height of the show's political storyline but must also progress other plot threads. Simon credited Overmyer with doing "much of the labor" on the storyline of Jimmy McNulty, which he said "felt smartly fleshed out" in key scenes. Overmyer left the crew at the end of the fourth season. Overmyer and the writing staff won the Writers Guild of America Award for Best Dramatic Series at the February 2008 ceremony and the 2007 Edgar Award for Best Television Feature/Mini-Series Teleplay for their work on the fourth season.

Overmyer collaborated with Simon again on the HBO drama Treme. They co-created the series which is about post-Katrina New Orleans. Overmyer lived part-time in New Orleans and used his experience in navigating the "ornate oral tradition" of the city's stories. The show focuses on a working-class neighborhood and is smaller in scope than The Wire. Production for the first season began in November 2009 and Overmyer worked on the show until it concluded with a fourth season in 2013.

In the hiatus between the third and fourth seasons of Treme Overmyer joined the crew of the HBO drama series Boardwalk Empire. He served as a co-executive producer for the fourth season until production recommenced on Treme. On Boardwalk Empire Overmyer reunited with his colleague from The Wire Dennis Lehane. He also worked with the writers Steve Turner and Jennifer Ames.

He developed the Amazon original series Bosch based on the series of novels by Michael Connelly. The project reunited him with actors Jamie Hector and Lance Reddick. A pilot was produced in 2013. The show was ordered to series after being released through the Amazon streaming service in February 2014. For his writing staff, Overmyer assembled several writers he had worked with before - Pelecanos from The Wire and Treme, Turner and Ames from Boardwalk Empire and William N. Fordes & Tom Smuts from Law & Order. The first season was shot throughout 2014 and released on February 13, 2015.

Overmyer died in Mount Vernon, New York, on March 16, 2026, at the age of 74.

== Published plays ==
His plays have been published by Broadway Play Publishing Inc. and include:

- Alki (adaptation of Peer Gynt by Henrik Ibsen)
- Amphitryon (adaption of the plays by Giraudoux and von Kleist respectively)
- Dark Rapture
- Don Quixote de La Jolla
- Figaro/Figaro
- The Heliotrope Bouquet by Scott Joplin and Louis Chauvin
- In a Pig's Valise
- In Perpetuity Throughout the Universe
- Mi Vida Loca
- Native Speech
- On the Verge

== Awards ==
Year	Award	Category	Result	Work	Notes
2008	Writers Guild of America Award	Outstanding Dramatic Series	Won	The Wire season 4	Shared with Ed Burns, Chris Collins, Kia Corthron, Dennis Lehane, David Mills, George Pelecanos, Richard Price, David Simon and William F. Zorzi
2007	Edgar Award	Best Television Feature/Mini-Series Teleplay	Won	The Wire season 4	Shared with Ed Burns, Kia Corthron, Dennis Lehane, David Mills, George Pelecanos, Richard Price, David Simon and William F. Zorzi
