= Lolis Eric Elie =

American writer and documentary filmmaker

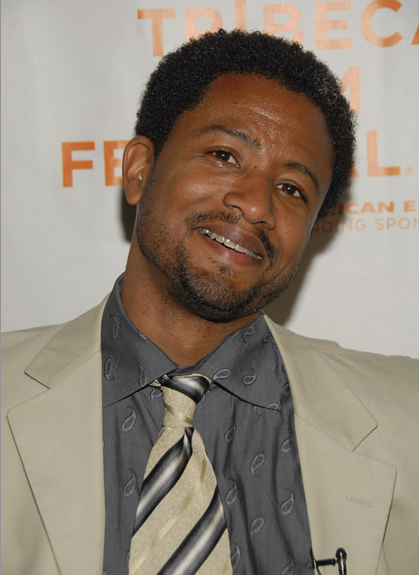
- Elie at the 2008 Tribeca Film Festival
- Born: April 10, 1963 (age 62); New Orleans, Louisiana, U.S.
- Education: Wharton School of the University of Pennsylvania (B.S., Finance and Economics, 1985), Columbia University School of Journalism (M.S, 1986), University of Virginia (MFA, Creative Writing, 1991)
- Occupation(s): Writer, filmmaker
- Notable work: Faubourg Treme: The Untold Story of Black New Orleans, Treme (TV Series), Hell on Wheels

Lolis Eric Elie (born April 10, 1963) is an American writer, journalist, documentary filmmaker, and food historian best known for his work as story editor of the HBO drama Treme and story editor of AMC's Hell on Wheels.

== Early life and education ==
Elie was born in New Orleans, Louisiana. He is the son of Lolis Edward Elie, a civil rights attorney and Dr. Gerri Elie, a school principal and university professor. He has an older sister, Migel Elizabeth Elie.

Elie is an alumnus of the New Orleans Center for Creative Arts (NOCCA) and a 1981 graduate of Benjamin Franklin High School. He went on to attend the Wharton School of the University of Pennsylvania where he graduated in 1985 with a B.S. in Finance and Economics. In 1986 he received his M.S. from Columbia University's Graduate School of Journalism, later becoming Alumnus of the Year in 2012. After graduating from Columbia University, Elie went on to receive an MFA in creative writing from University of Virginia.

== Career ==
Elie began his career as a business reporter for the Atlanta Journal-Constitution. He then went on to become the road manager for jazz musician Wynton Marsalis. In 1995 he became a columnist and reporter for the New Orleans Times-Picayune. During this time he wrote several books, including Smokestack Lightning: Adventures in the Heart of Barbecue Country, a book that gained a cult-like following among food enthusiasts. Elie also wrote and produced the award-winning documentary Faubourg Treme: The Untold Story of Black New Orleans (2008), which premiered at the Tribeca Film Festival, was a winner at the 2008 San Francisco International Film Festival, and which made its TV debut on PBS in 2009.

After leaving the Times Picayune in 2009, Elie became the story editor for HBO's Treme. He wrote the episodes "I Thought I Heard Buddy Bolden Say", "Shame, Shame, Shame" and "Santa Claus, Do You Ever Get the Blues?" for which he won an NAACP Award. In 2013, Elie moved to Los Angeles where he became the executive story editor for AMC's Hell on Wheels. His work has appeared in the New York Times, Washington Post, San Francisco Chronicle, Saveur, Gourmet, Bon Appétit, and Smithsonian magazine and he has been featured on NPR, CBS News, and 60 Minutes. His work is included in Best African American Essays and Best Food Writing: 2008. He is also a contributing editor to the Oxford American.

Elie has been featured several times on Travel Channel's No Reservations and The Layover, both hosted by Anthony Bourdain.

Elie is one of the founders of the Southern Foodways Alliance. On July 23, 2013, his book Treme: Stories and Recipes from the Heart of New Orleans was released. Saveur named the book as one of the Best July Food Books.

== Works ==
=== Television and film ===
- 1997 "Postcards from New Orleans" segment on CBS News Sunday Morning, correspondent
- 2001 Smokestack Lightning: A Day in the Life of Barbecue (documentary), producer
- 2006 By Invitation Only, project advisor
- 2008 My 1st Time: Tribeca Film Festival (TV short), himself
- 2008 Faubourg Treme: The Untold Story of Black New Orleans (documentary), writer and co-producer
- 2008 After Hours with Daniel Boulud, himself
- 2010 "Shame, Shame, Shame" (HBO's Treme, season 1, episode 5), writer
- 2011 Treme, story editor, 10 episodes
- 2011 "Santa Claus, Do You Ever Get the Blues?" (Treme, season 2, episode 4), writer
- 2011 "That's What Lovers Do" (Treme, season 2, episode 10), actor
- 2011 "Cajun Country" (Travel Channel's Anthony Bourdain: No Reservations, season 7, episode 16), himself
- 2012 "I Thought I Heard Buddy Bolden Say" (Treme, season 3, episode 5), writer
- 2012 NOLAbound (documentary), narrator
- 2013 AMC's Hell on Wheels, executive story editor, 10 episodes
- 2013 "One Less Mule" (Hell on Wheels, season 3, episode 6), co-writer
- 2013 PBS's Soul Food Junkies (Independent Lens documentary), himself
- 2013 "The Paper" 60 Minutes, himself
- 2013 Super Bowl 2013 Pregame Special: New Orleans, Let the Good Times Roll, himself
- 2014 Old South, New South (short film), himself
- 2016 WGN America's Underground, co-producer, 4 episodes
- 2017 "Changing Season" (Oprah Winfrey Network's Greenleaf season 2, episode 11), writer
- 2018 "That Was Then" (Greenleaf season 3, episode 7), writer
- 2018 "Fried Chicken" (Netflix's Ugly Delicious season 1, episode 6), himself
- 2018 "Zakarian vs. Darin" (Food Network's Iron Chef America season 13, episode 3), himself
- 2018 Gumbo (documentary), himself
- 2019 Amazon Prime Video's The Man in the High Castle, supervising producer, 10 episodes
- 2019 "All Serious Daring" (The Man in the High Castle season 4, episode 6), writer
- 2020 Showtime's The Chi supervising producer, 10 episodes
- 2020 "Buss Down" (The Chi season 3, episode 3), writer
- 2020 Driving While Black: Race, Space and Mobility in America (documentary), himself and historical advisor
- 2020 A Crime on the Bayou (documentary), himself and consultant
- 2021 Amazon Prime Video's Bosch, co-executive producer, 8 episodes
- 2021 "Triple Play" (Bosch season 7, episode 4), writer

=== Books ===
- Smokestack Lightning: Adventures in the Heart of Barbecue Country (1996); re-published in 2005
- Cornbread Nation 2: The United States of Barbecue, editor (2004)
- Treme: Stories and Recipes from the Heart of New Orleans (2013)
- Rodney Scott's World of BBQ, co-author (2021)

=== Short fiction and essays ===
- "Silent Spaces", short fiction in That's What I Like (About the South) (1993)
- "Leah Chase", essay in Cornbread Nation 1: The Best of Southern Food Writing (2002)
- "A Letter from New Orleans", essay in Best Food Writing 2006
- Prospect. 1 New Orleans (2008)
- Then … Absence, prefatory note (2008)
- "Here They Come, There They Go", essay in Unfathomable City: A New Orleans Atlas (2013)
- After: the Silence of the Lower 9th Ward, preface (2014)
