= Bouquet with Flying Lovers =

Painting by Marc Chagall

Bouquet with Flying Lovers is an oil on canvas painting by Belarusian-French painter Marc Chagall, from 1963. It is held at the Tate Modern.

According to Chagall himself, he started working on the painting in the 1930s when he lived in Paris, and he finished the work when he was mourning the death of his wife Bella. The image is predominantly blue and shows a bouquet of flowers in the center. Above the flowers, two lovers float in the air. An angel enters through the window. The buildings on the right side depict Vitebsk, Chagall's birth village.

== See also ==
- List of artworks by Marc Chagall
