= Le Grand Cirque =

Le Grand Cirque may refer to:

- Le Grand Cirque, a 1948 wartime memoir by Pierre Clostermann
- Le Grand Cirque (film), a 1950 film adaptation of the memoir directed by Georges Péclet
- Le Grand Cirque (1956 painting), by Marc Chagall
- Le Grand Cirque (1968 painting), by Marc Chagall
