= America Windows =

Stained glass windows by Marc Chagall

- Leftmost stained glass, often panel 1 or panels 1 and 2 Center stained glass, often panel 2 or panels 3 and 4 Center stained glass, often panel 3 or panels 5 and 6 America Windows (1977) presented here stacked although on display side-by-side
- Artist: Marc Chagall
- Year: 1977
- Medium: stained glass
- Dimensions: 240 cm × 980 cm (96 in × 385 in)
- Location: Art Institute of Chicago
- Accession: 1977.938
- Website: www.artic.edu/artworks/109439/america-windows

America Windows is a 1977 set of stained glass window panels by Marc Chagall that is located at the Art Institute of Chicago in the Loop community area of Chicago, Illinois, United States. The panels were a gift to the City of Chicago by Chagall, the City of Chicago, and the Auxiliary Board of The Art Institute of Chicago. It consists of three or six themed panels, depending on the source, commemorating the United States Bicentennial in memory of recently deceased Chicago Mayor Richard J. Daley. The set of panels is 96 inches (2.4 m) high by 385 inches (9.8 m) wide and was dedicated on May 15, 1977.

America Windows was planned and installed during a period during which the city was supporting large-scale art by prominent artists. The stained glass windows were originally located facing McKinlock Court until 2005. During the Modern Wing addition to the Art Institute, they were removed for a period of conservation treatment. In 2010, they were reinstalled in an interior gallery away from natural sunlight and condensation.

They were Chagall's first stained glass windows that were not focused on religious themes and the second that were not at a religious institution. These were the first stained glass windows designed and installed for the aesthetic benefit of museum viewers rather than as architectural elements. Chagall worked in collaboration with glassmaker Charles Marq in France to design, assemble, ornament and refine the stained glass windows.

== Background ==
Chagall is best known as a painter, but he gained many years of stained glass experience before this task. His favorite color was blue. He once stated "I am blue like Rembrandt was brown." Chagall is known for his use of color and light. Pablo Picasso once said "When Matisse dies, Chagall will be the only painter left who understands what colour really is. . .there's never been anybody since Renoir who has the feeling for light that Chagall has."

Chagall is Jewish and was rescued during World War II by the United States, in particular the Museum of Modern Art (MoMA). A Chagall exhibition that began at the MoMA April 9–June 23, 1946 continued at The Art Institute of Chicago, November 14, 1946 – January 12, 1947. Chagall did a lecture at the University of Chicago in 1946 and three more in 1958. Chagall exhibited works at the Renaissance Society at the University of Chicago from January 6–February 2, 1957 and again from February 15–March 8, 1958. He began producing stained glass window works in 1957. After his first commission for two glass windows for Église Notre-Dame de Toute Grâce du Plateau d'Assy, he worked in collaboration with Charles Marq of Atelier Jacques Simon of Reims on two cathedral windows at Metz Cathedral. Their stained glass collaboration continued for decades.

In the 1960s and 1970s, the City of Chicago installed several prominent grand public works by important artists such as Chicago Picasso (1967) by Picasso. The city commissioned Miró's Chicago by Joan Miró in 1969 although it did not get funded for another decade. In 1974, Alexander Calder installed Flamingo on October 25, and Chagall installed the mosaic Four Seasons on September 27, both in the Chicago Loop. By the time of the America Windows unveiling, Chagall had worked with Marq for over 20 years and the Art Institute had five Chagall paintings as well as 66 prints, 3 drawings and 4 illustrated books.

When Chagall did Four Seasons, he made a fan of Mayor Daley, according to Chicago Director of Special Events Col. Jack Reilly. Reilly confirmed that the $150,000 ($797,000 in 2025) – $200,000 ($1.06 million in 2025) cost would be paid from hotel and motel taxes that are earmarked for tourism promotion. Additional funding was supplied by the Auxiliary Board of the Art Institute. The work would commemorate the United States Bicentennial, or it would serve as a memorial to Daley, depending on the source. It is regarded as an essential work of the Art Institute. The stained glass windows would be illuminated by natural light.

== History ==
In April 1976, Charles Marq brought Chagall's designs to Mayor Daley's office while Marq was in town observing light quality and window dimensions and orientation. He determined that the windows that the stained glass would be placed in would be east facing windows like those at the Musée Marc Chagall in Nice, where Chagall had previously installed stained glass windows. The original plan was to install several windows measuring 8 by 30 feet (2.44 m × 9.14 m) in a Chagall gallery and lounge at the Art Institute to honor Daley. America Windows was unveiled on May 15, 1977 (Daley's birthday). The official designation of the gallery was Gallery 150 and the space was donated by the Auxiliary Board of the Art Institute. Subsequently, in their original position (which can be seen prominently in Ferris Bueller's Day Off) facing McKinlock court, regular condensation attracted "atmospheric deposits of oil and calcium carbonate".

Chagall's stained glass windows were removed in May 2005 during the Modern Wing Expansion, which put them at risk to vibration-heavy construction. While not on view, they spent two years getting q-tip like cleaning. The Modern Wing of the Art Institute was opened in 2009. America Windows was relocated and reinstalled in November 1, 2010. The official location of the relocated work is gallery 144. Because the city had undergone a "modern cultural renaissance" in the Loop area at the time leading up to the original presentation, the work was relocated to a space where it is accompanied by models of nearby public art from Jean Dubuffet (Monument with Standing Beast), Miró, and Picasso from the AIC's collection. At the time of the reinstallation, a model of Calder's Flamingo was also present on loan. Funding for the reinstallation came from a grant from the Walter E. Heller Foundation in memory of Alyce DeCosta.

== Process ==
Chagall sent glassmaker, Charles Marq, to understand the lighting nuances for its placement in a courtyard of a building situated between Lake Michigan and tall skyscrapers. He created watercolor and gouache sketches for Marq. He added bits of fabric from Zurich-based cloth manufacturer, Gustav Zumsteg to the sketches before adding final watercolor and ink drawings. Marq, who is based 800 kilometres (497 mi) from Chagall, then photographed Chagall's output and enlarged it. Then, Marq cut flashed glass to specification of the sketches and pieced them together with lead. Marq treated the glass with acid wash and delivered panels to Chagall in Saint-Paul-de-Vence, France. Chagall would then paint, scrape and scratch the glass to achieve his artistic design. He used metal oxide paint and heat fusion for this final step. Marq and partner Brigitte are from Jaques Simon, which is a centuries-old atelier. Marq pioneered a "plated glass" technique with overlaid colors for increased artistic expression.

== Details ==
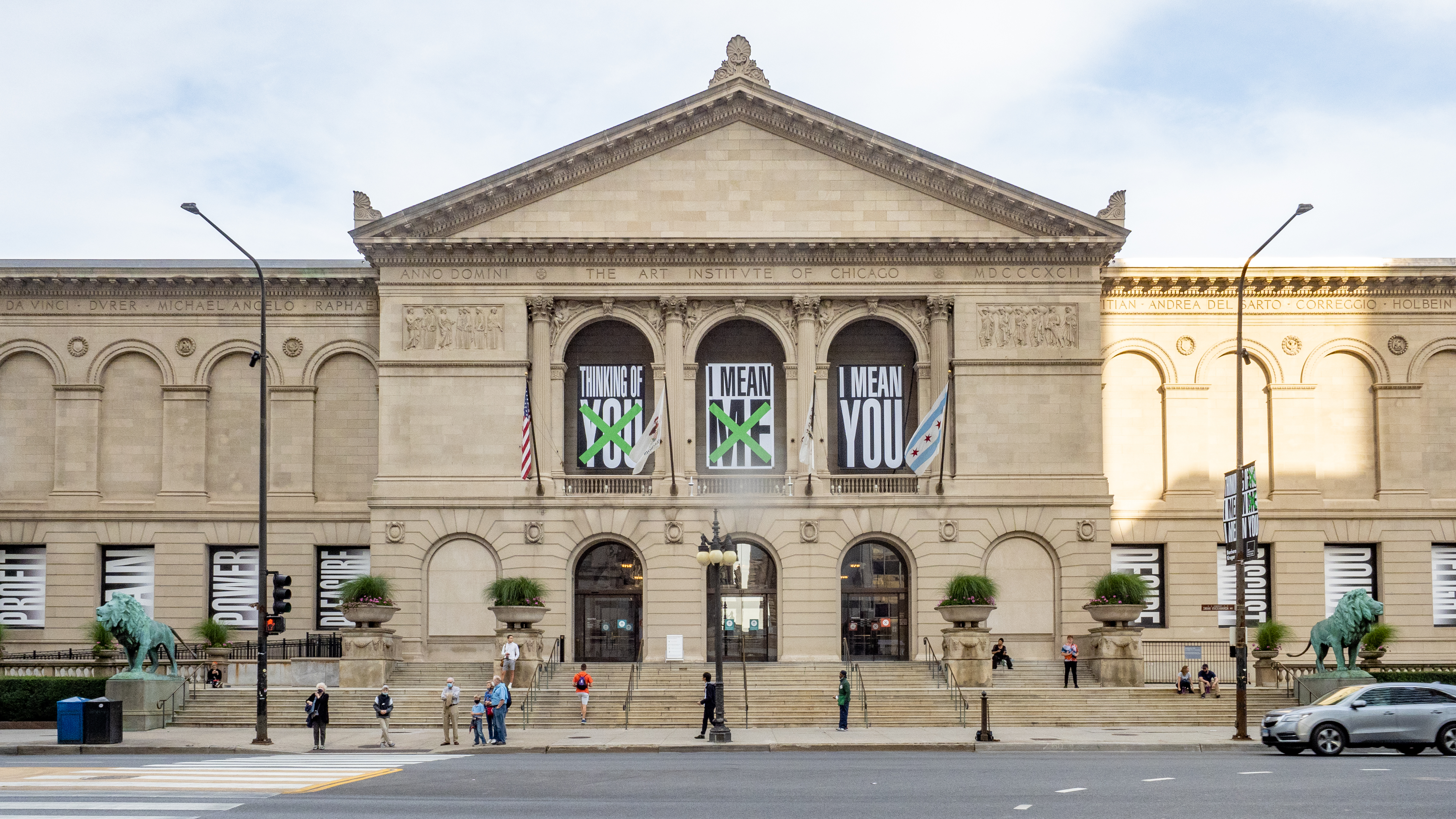
Art Institute of Chicago in 2021

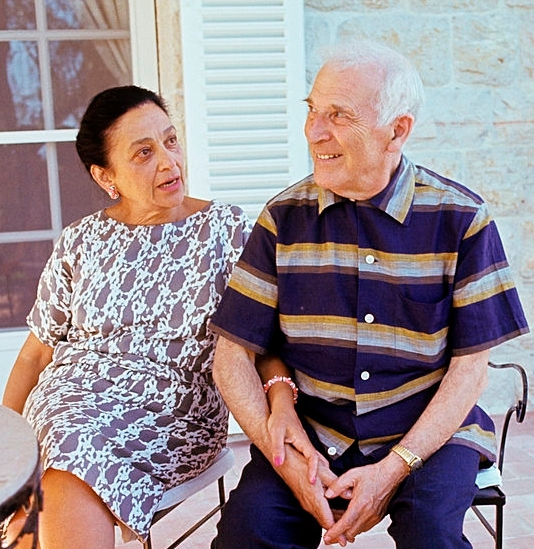
Vava Brodsky and Marc Chagall in 1967

The Art Institute describes the panels as a set of six with each focusing on a themes from the arts: (left to right) "music, painting, literature, architecture, theater, and dance". However, The J. Paul Getty Trust database on cultural objects describes it as "Three glass windows, having the dominant color blue, with themes celebrating religious freedom, opportunity, and diversity. . ." The Art Journal uses the phrase "three. . .windows consisting of two panels each,. . ." This description is echoed by the Music Educators Journal. At times, the work is described as composed of 36 panels. Chagall approaches stained glass from the perspective of a seasoned painter whose skill and mastery is an "...ability to animate the material and transform it into light" as well as an ability to use "infinite nuances dominated by a single color" Some reviewers discuss the themes by panel and some by window.

Jointly, the windows embody Chagall's celebration of the freedom of religion and are dependent on light to bring the colors to life. America Windows are the confluence of Chagall's use of reality, mysticism and imagery of twirling airborn humans and objects.

The work mainly uses nuanced variations of blue complemented with red, gold, green, orange and purple. The six panels with themes representing the arts and patriotism feature "tilting skyscrapers, a hand holding a flowering pen, an upside-down dancer floating in space, a small actor holding an enormous candelabra, a whirling disc symbolizing crative energy, and a music stand in mid-air". This work saw the introduction of themes by Chagall, including musical staffs with notes in the upper left corner of the left panel, which is possibly a reference to the angel Gabriel and a cello below in a contiguous glass segment. With the musical elements one could interpret the entire work musically, with each of the three elements composing a horizontal register, separated by a vertical bar serving as syncopation. Along with familiar symbols (chickens, doves and angels), we see a religious symbols (menorah and seder), with the latter substituting for the suns that are common Chagall symbols. Chagall made this work relevant to American's by including the Statue of Liberty.

The windows are Chagall's first that do not focus on religion and the second of his stained-glass window designs to be installed in a museum. The windows are a huge leap forward for the art world as the first stainless glass windows created with the intention and potential to contribute to a museum in the same aesthetic manner as painting and sculpture rather than as a subordinate contribution for architecture. The three panels appear to be independent compositions because edge designs do not show continuation.

The first panel about music has a yellow horn player above a stringed instrument and elements that the Chicago Tribune writer Alan Artner describes violins as musical notes, foliage and other-worldly observers. Music Educators Journal also notes the musical theme of the first panel enumerating "figures of musicians, a musical score, violins, and a horn mingled with a few nonmusical elements."

Panel two represents painting with a palette, paintbrushes, easel and still lifes.

Music Educators Journal notes that the center window uses arts and American history symbols, but later discusses the work panel by panel. Panel three embodies literature. Artner sees the signing of the United States Declaration of Independence, the sun, light, desk, a hand and flowers. In addition to the signing, Music Educators Journal sees books and an inkwell as literature symbols.

Panel four is described as depicting American liberty with an american eagle and the Statue of Liberty. Although the windows were created at least in part to celebrate the freedoms enjoyed at the time of the Bicentennial celebration and the eagle is an American national symbol, some people believe the bird is a dove of peace. The architecture with part of a Chicago cityscape is also visible.

The fifth panel depicts theater with a central figure that is a hybrid of a humanistic and plantlike elements surrounded by figures carrying a mask and a candelabra. Other theater symbols include a curtain, actor, and harlequin with mask.

The sixth panel about dance, and it has a group of three dancing figures (one with a tambourine). In the upper left colors and shapes convey movement, especially with the orange, green and blue hubcap-like design around the small figure.

== See also ==
- List of artworks by Marc Chagall
- List of public art in Chicago
