= The Painter and His Fiancée =

1980 painting by Marc Chagall

- Artist: Marc Chagall
- Year: 1980
- Medium: oil on canvas
- Dimensions: 116 cm × 88.7 cm (46 in × 34.9 in)
- Location: Pushkin Museum, Moscow, Russia

The Painter and His Fiancée is an oil on canvas painting by Marc Chagall, from 1980. It is held since 1990 in the Pushkin Museum, in Moscow. A double portrait from his final years, it depicts a nocturnal view of Paris, with a couple at the right, a painter, holding his palette, and a reclined woman. The couple, according with the title of the painting, is engaged. At their right stands a vase with red flowers. In the background it shows Notre Dame Cathedral.

== See also ==
- List of artworks by Marc Chagall
- 1980 in art
