= The Yellow Crucifixion =

1943 painting by Marc Chagall

- Artist: Marc Chagall
- Year: 1943
- Medium: Oil on canvas
- Dimensions: 140 cm × 101 cm (55 in × 40 in)
- Location: Musée National d'Art Moderne; Paris

The Yellow Crucifixion is a painting by Marc Chagall. It was painted in 1943 and is on display at Musée National d'Art Moderne in Paris, France.

== Description ==
The piece reworked many themes that first occurred in Chagall's more famous artwork White Crucifixion whereby the suffering of Jewish victims of the Holocaust was communicated through the image of Jesus Christ as a Jew.

Jesus is not the central image of this picture, and instead shares the canvas with a large green Torah scroll and angel. This positioning emphasises the Jewish character of Jesus in this work, supported by Jesus wearing a Jewish prayer shawl (tallit) and tefillin.

The surrounding details are scenes from the pogroms occurring in Europe. There is a burning shtetl to the right, surrounded by distressed looking figures. Below this is found a Jew wearing traditional Jewish clothing (and a placard) and a fleeing woman with her child. The latter scene is reminiscent of the story of Jesus’ flight to Egypt as a child.

Another theme that has been reworked into the Yellow Crucifixion, which first appeared in the White Crucifixion, is the presence of a ship. The significant difference is that in this painting, the ship is shown sinking into the waters. This is undoubtedly an allusion to the Struma disaster in 1942. The fact that Jesus is looking down on the ship, watching the passengers, is said to convey the artist's own passage to New York City from Europe that took place by ship.

Other details include fish leaping out of the sea and a goat.

== Influence ==
Reformed theologian Jürgen Moltmann mentions this painting as being his muse while writing The Crucified God, a book which has been called a Christian theology after Auschwitz:

"In front of me hangs Marc Chagall’s picture Crucifixion in Yellow. It shows the figure of the crucified Christ in an apocalyptic situation: people sinking into the sea, people homeless and in flight, and yellow fire blazing in the background. And with the crucified Christ there appears the angel with the trumpet and the open roll of the book of life [Rev 14.6]. This picture has accompanied me for a long time. It symbolizes the cross on the horizon of the world, and can be thought of as a symbolic expression of the studies which follow."

== See also ==
- List of artworks by Marc Chagall
