= The Poet Reclining =

1915 painting by Marc Chagall

The Poet Reclining (Le Poète allongé) is a painting by Marc Chagall, painted in oils in 1915. It is owned by Tate Modern, in London. In 2016 it was on display at the Towner Gallery in Eastbourne, Sussex.

== Description ==
The painter took inspiration from his honeymoon with Bella Rosenfeld, in 1915. It depicts the poet of the title lying in the ground, like if he was resting. He wears a blue shirt and black pants. In the background appears a wood country house, with a horse and a pig in a field. Two trees grow there and in the background a forest is visible.

== See also ==
- List of artworks by Marc Chagall
