= The Summer Night's Dream (painting) =

1939 painting by Marc Chagall

The Summer Night's Dream or The Dream on a Summer's Night (French - Le Songe d'une nuit d'été) is a 1939 oil on canvas painting by Marc Chagall, showing a young woman in a wedding dress and a man with a goat's head. It is in the Museum of Grenoble, to which it was given by the artist in 1951. He also donated a 1935 version of the same work in varnished paint and gouache on hardboard to the same museum in 1953. The title may refer to William Shakespeare's A Midsummer Night's Dream, though in that play a man is transformed into an ass not a goat.

== See also ==
- List of artworks by Marc Chagall
