= Marc Chagall Museum =

Museum dedicated to the painter Marc Chagall, in Vitebsk, Belarus

Coordinates: 55°12′02″N 30°11′27″E

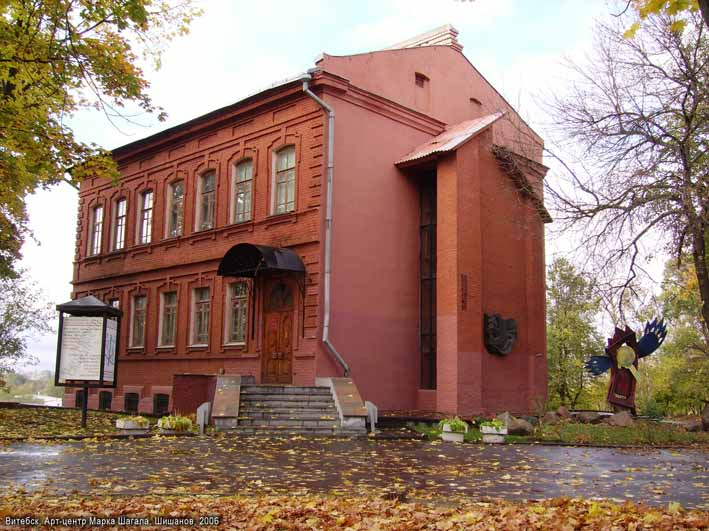
- The Marc Chagall Art Center in Vitebsk
- Established: 1971
- Location: Vitebsk
- Type: Art museum
- Website: Official site

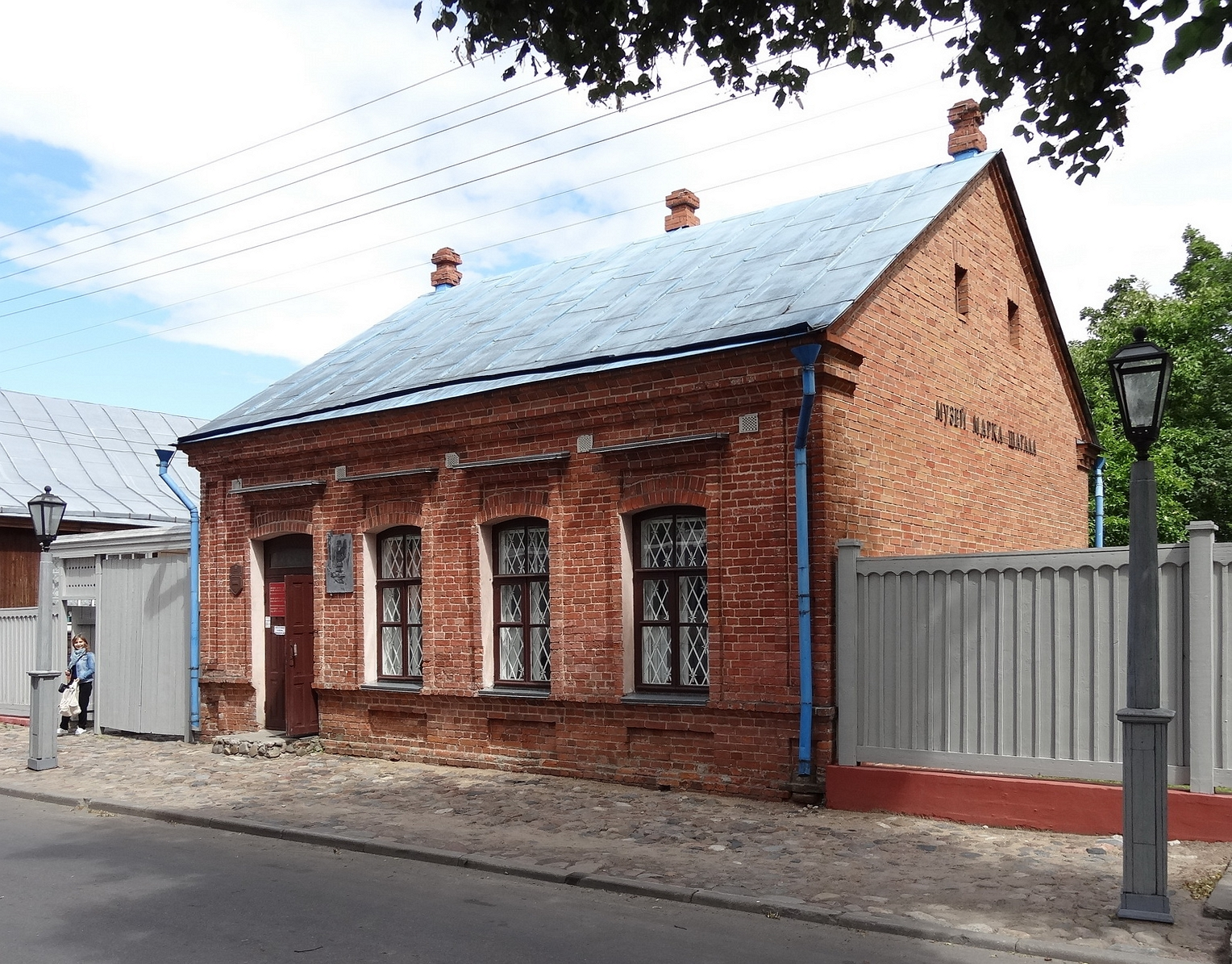
Marc Chagall's childhood house in Vitebsk, Belarus.

The Marc Chagall Museum (Belarusian: Віцебскі музей Марка Шагала, romanized: Viciebski muziej Marka Šahala) is a museum dedicated to the painter Marc Chagall, in his hometown of Vitebsk, Belarus. The museum was founded by the Vitebsk City Executive Committee's decision on October 23, 1991.

The total area is 294 m^{2} (3,160 ft^{2}); it has five exposition and four exhibition halls. The museum is housed in two buildings, the Marc Chagall Art Center and the Marc Chagall House-Museum.

== Marc Chagall Art Center ==
The Marc Chagall Art Center, at 2 Putna Street, was opened in 1992. Exhibitions of graphic works by Chagall from the museum's collection are held here: woodcuts, etchings, aquatints, a series of illustrations of Nikolai Gogol's novel "Dead Souls" (1923-1925), a series of color lithographs from 1956 and 1960 on the theme of the Bible, a cycle of colour lithographs entitled The 12 tribes of Israel (1960) and other of his works. The museum also houses a collection of printed graphics by European avant-garde artists such as Joan Miró, Pablo Picasso and Fernand Léger. The Art Center has a scientific library dedicated to the works of Chagall and other avant-garde artists, which has more than 3500 volumes.

== Marc Chagall House-Museum ==
The Marc Chagall House-Museum, at 11 Pokrovskaya Street, was opened in 1997 and is located in the house built by the artist's father in the early 1900s. It was here that Chagall spent his youth; he wrote about this period in the autobiographical book My Life. The household items of the townspeople of the 19th and 20th centuries are shown as well as copies of archival documents and works relating to the life of Chagall and his family in Vitebsk.

As of 2021, the nearby synagogue where Chagall and his family were congregants, the Great Lubavitch Synagogue, is open to investors interested in restoring the dilapidated building.

== Books ==
- Шишанов В. А. Витебский музей современного искусства: история создания и коллекции. 1918–1941. Минск: Медисонт, 2007. — 144 с.
- Апчинская Н. Марк Шагал. Портрет художника. М., 1995
- Шишанов В. К вопросу о «первом опыте обращения к творчеству Шагала в местной печати» // Бюллетень Музея Марка Шагала. 2004. No. 2(12). С.12-16.
- Шишанов, В. «Эти молодые люди были ярыми социалистами…». Участники революционного движения в окружении Марка Шагала и Беллы Розенфельд / В.А. Шишанов // Бюллетень Музея Марка Шагала. – 2005. – No.13. – С. 64 – 74.
- Шишанов В. Об утраченном портрете Марка Шагала работы Юрия Пэна // Бюллетень Музея Марка Шагала. 2006. No. 14. С. 110–111.
- Шишанов В. А. Транслингвистическая порча [Рец. на книги: Шагал Б. Горящие огни: Пер. с фр. Н.Мавлевич. М.: Текст, 2001. 351 с.: ил. Шагал Б. Горящие светильники: Пер. с нем. Г.Снежинская. СПб.: Лимбус Пресс, 2001. 224 с.] // Бюллетень Музея Марка Шагала. 2002. No. 2(8). С.17-19.
- Шишанов В. Художественная жизнь Витебска на страницах изданий «Известия Витгубисполкома совучдепов», «Школа и революция», «Юный марсиянин» // Шагаловский сборник. Вып. 2. Материалы VI—IX Шагаловских чтений в Витебске (1996—1999). Витебск: Музей М.Шагала, 2004. С.121-124.
- Шишанов В. Материалы о Ю. М. Пэне в РГАЛИ / В. Шишанов. // Малевич. Классический авангард. Витебск — 11: [альманах / ред. Т. Котович]. — Минск: Экономпресс, 2009. — С.42-55.
- Шишанов В. Марк Шагал: этюды к биографии художника по архивным делам // Шагаловский сборник. Вып. 3. Материалы X – XIV Шагаловских чтений в Витебске (2000-2004). Минск: «Рифтур», 2008. С.171–175.
- Родити Э. Диалоги об искусстве: Марк Шагал / Вступление и комментарии В. Шишанов. Перевод с немецкого А.Белодед// Бюллетень Музея Марка Шагала. 2002. No. 1 (7). — С.6—13.
- SHISHANOV, Valery. SOME LINES FROM THE LIFE OF MARC CHAGALL // Mishpoha. 2010. No.26. P. 46 - 50.
- Музей Марка Шагала в Ницце — Le Musee National Message Biblique Marc Chagall («Библейское послание Марка Шагала»)
- Людмила ХМЕЛЬНИЦКАЯ. Музей Марка Шагала в Витебске.
- Людмила ХМЕЛЬНИЦКАЯ. Марк Шагал в художественной культуре Беларуси 1920-х — 1990-х годов.
- Мерет Мейер. Фрагмент биографии Марка Шагала.
- Шишанов, В. А. «Двойной портрет с бокалом вина» – в поисках источников сюжета картины Марка Шагала / В. А. Шишанов // Марк Шагал и Петербург. К 125-летию со дня рождения художника / науч. ред. и сост. : О.Л. Лейкинд, Д.Я. Северюхин. – С.-Петербург : Издательство «Европейский Дом», 2013.– С. 167–176.

== See also ==
- List of artworks by Marc Chagall
- List of single-artist museums
- Musée Marc Chagall
