= Nocturne (Chagall) =

1947 painting by Marc Chagall

- Artist: Marc Chagall
- Year: 1947
- Medium: oil on canvas
- Dimensions: 90 cm × 73 cm (35 in × 29 in)
- Location: Pushkin Museum of Fine Arts, Moscow, Russia

Nocturne is an oil on canvas painting by Marc Chagall, created in 1947. It depicts a nocturne scene on a city, in the magical realism style of the artist, with some animals visible. Its a farewell painting dedicated to his late wife Bella Rosenfeld. It is one of three works by the artist now in the Pushkin Museum, in Moscow.

== See also ==
- List of artworks by Marc Chagall
