= Self-Portrait with Seven Fingers =

Painting by Marc Chagall

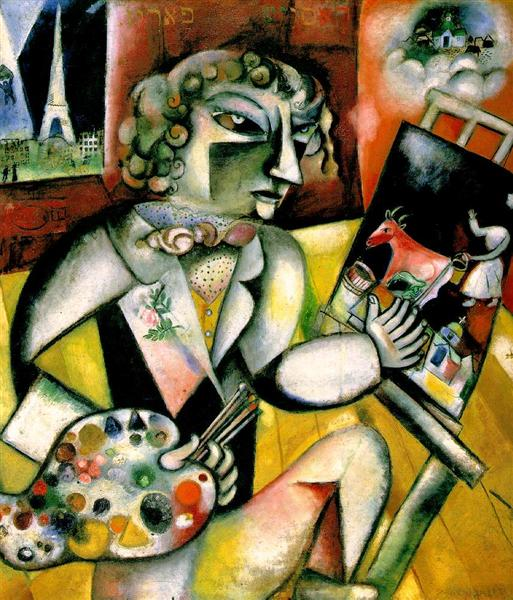
- Artist: Marc Chagall
- Year: 1913
- Medium: Oil on canvas
- Dimensions: 127 cm × 107 cm (50 in × 42 in)
- Location: Stedelijk Museum Amsterdam, Amsterdam

Self-Portrait with Seven Fingers is a 1913 oil painting by Belarusian-French painter Marc Chagall, painted in 1913 in France. This oil on canvas is a self-portrait in which the artist represents himself painting a reduced version of Of Russia, of Donkeys and Others, with seven fingers on one hand. It is kept as part of the Chagall collection at the Stedelijk Museum Amsterdam, in Amsterdam, Netherlands.

== See also ==
- Self-portraiture
- List of artworks by Marc Chagall
