= Scène de Cirque =

Painting by Marc Chagall

- Circus Scene (English)
- Artist: Marc Chagall
- Year: 1970
- Medium: Oil on canvas
- Dimensions: 72.7 cm × 91.7 cm (28.6 in × 36.1 in)
- Owner: Private collection

Scène de Cirque is an oil on canvas painting by Belarusian-French artist Marc Chagall, from c. 1970. It is held in a private collection.

== Description ==
The canvas features acrobats, trapeze artists and clowns. The subject of circus was dear to the artist. Chagall often returned to the circus as a subject matter in his artworks. He considered clowns, acrobats and actors as tragically human beings who are like characters in certain religious paintings. Among other Post-Impressionist and Modern painters who featured the circus in their works are Georges Seurat, Henri de Toulouse-Lautrec, Pablo Picasso, Georges Rouault, Kees van Dongen, and Fernand Léger.

== Provenance ==
The painting has been estate of the artist till 1998 when it was sold to private collector. In 2017 it was acquired by a private American collector at Sotheby's.

== Exhibitions ==
- Reykjavik, National Gallery of Iceland, The Reykjavik Arts Festival, 1998

== See also ==
- List of artworks by Marc Chagall
