= I and the Village =

Painting by Marc Chagall

- Artist: Marc Chagall
- Year: 1911
- Catalogue: 78984
- Medium: Oil on canvas
- Dimensions: 192.1 cm × 151.4 cm (75.6 in × 59.6 in)
- Location: Museum of Modern Art, New York
- Accession: 146.1945

I and the Village is a 1911 oil-on-canvas painting by the Russian-French artist Marc Chagall created in 1911. It is exhibited at the Museum of Modern Art, New York.

== Description ==
The work is Cubist in construction and contains many soft, dreamlike images overlapping one another in a continuous space. In the foreground, a cap-wearing green-faced man stares at a goat or sheep with the image of a smaller goat being milked on its cheek. In the foreground is a glowing tree held in the man's dark hand. The background features a collection of houses next to an Orthodox church, and an upside-down female violinist in front of a black-clothed man holding a scythe. The green-faced man wears a necklace with St. Andrew's cross. As the title suggests, I and the Village is influenced by memories of the artist's birthplace and his relationship to it. I and the Village is the enduring love between Chagall and his wife, Bella. Some interpretations identify the female figure in the painting as Bella.

The significance of the painting lies in its seamless integration of various elements of Eastern European folktales and culture, both Belarusian and Yiddish. Its clearly defined semiotic elements (e.g. The Tree of Life) and daringly whimsical style were at the time considered groundbreaking. Its frenetic, fanciful style is credited to Chagall's childhood memories becoming, in the words of scholar H. W. Janson, a "cubist fairy tale" reshaped by his imagination, without regard to natural color, size or even the laws of gravity. The work reflects Chagall’s synthesis of Russian-Jewish folklore and the avant-garde influences of Parisian modernism.

== See also ==
- List of artworks by Marc Chagall
- 100 Great Paintings, 1980 BBC series

== Sources ==
- Charlotte Douglas, Jeannene M. Przyblyski, I and the village: early works, Jewish Community Museum, 1987
- Rosenblum, Robert. Cubism and Twentieth-Century Art. New York: Harry N. Abrams, 1966.
