= Metropolitan Opera House (Lincoln Center) =

Opera house in Manhattan, New York

- "The Met"
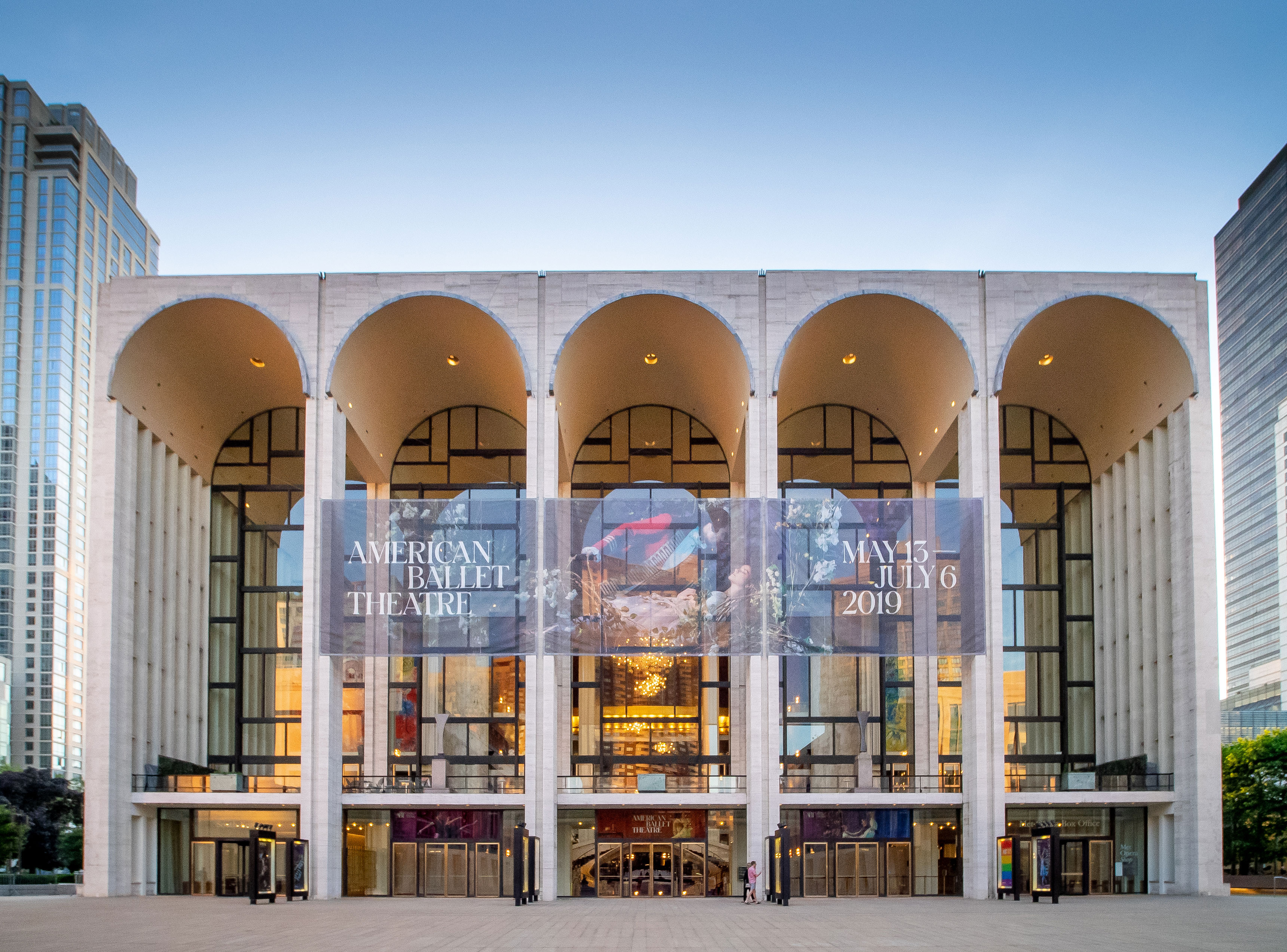
- Metropolitan Opera House seen from Lincoln Center Plaza
- Interactive map of Metropolitan Opera House
- Address: 30 Lincoln Center Plaza
- Location: New York City
- Coordinates: 40°46′22″N 73°59′3″W
- Owner: Metropolitan Opera Association
- Capacity: 3,850
- Type: Opera house
- Event: Modernist
- Public transit: Subway: at 66th Street–Lincoln Center; Bus: M5, M7, M11, M20, M66, M104

Construction
- Built: 1963–1966
- Opened: September 16, 1966
- Architects: Wallace Harrison, Harrison & Abramovitz Architects

Website
- metopera.org

The Metropolitan Opera House (also known as The Met) is an opera house located on Broadway at Lincoln Square on the Upper West Side of Manhattan in New York City. Part of Lincoln Center, the theater was designed by Wallace K. Harrison. It opened in 1966, replacing the original 1883 Metropolitan Opera House at Broadway and 39th Street. With a total capacity of 3,975 (175 being standing-room spaces), the house is the largest repertory opera house in the world. Home to the Metropolitan Opera Company, the facility also hosts the American Ballet Theatre in the summer months.

== History ==
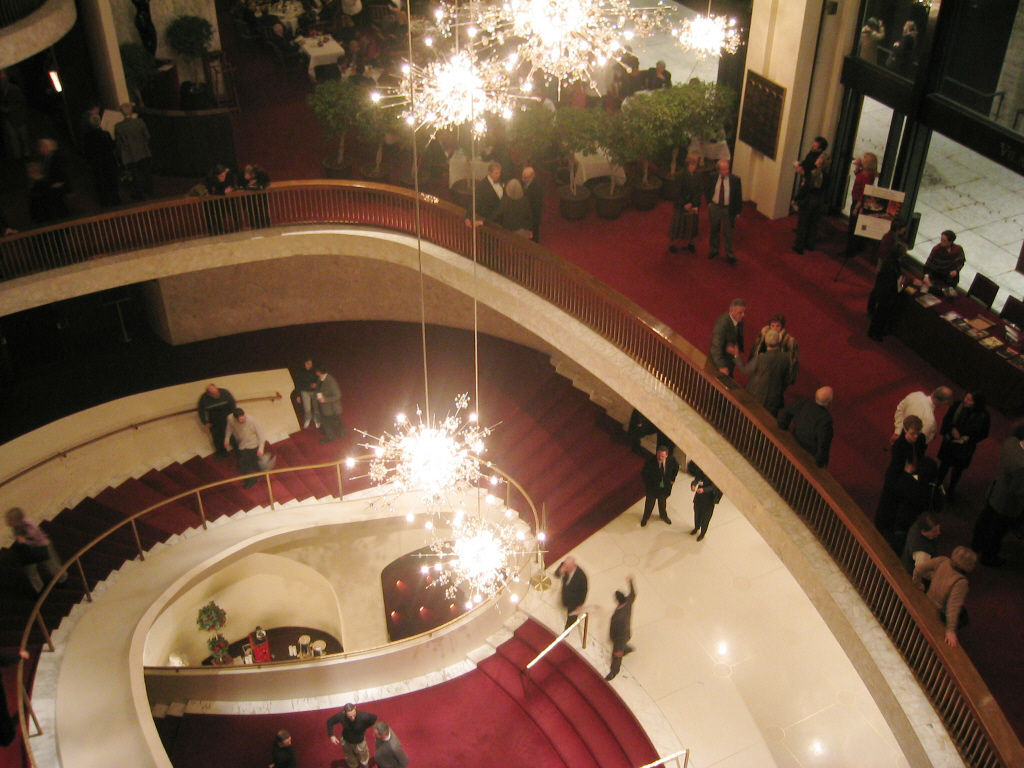
The lobby staircase from above

Buildings of Lincoln Center
Buildings and structures in Lincoln Center:
1 Samuel B. and David Rose Building (includes Walter Reade Theater)
2 Juilliard School
3 Alice Tully Hall
4 Vivian Beaumont Theater (includes Mitzi E. Newhouse Theater and Claire Tow Theater)
5 Elinor Bunin Monroe Film Center
6 David Geffen Hall
7 New York Public Library for the Performing Arts (includes Bruno Walter Auditorium)
8 Metropolitan Opera House
9 Josie Robertson Plaza with Revson Fountain
10 Damrosch Park
11 David H. Koch Theater
12 David Rubenstein Atrium
13 Jazz at Lincoln Center

=== Planning and construction ===
Planning for a new home for the Metropolitan Opera began as early as the mid-1920s, when the backstage facilities of the former house were becoming vastly inadequate for growing repertory and advancing stagecraft. As part of the development of the present-day Rockefeller Center site, there was to be a development with a new 4,000-seat opera house at its center. Financial problems and the following stock market crash of 1929 postponed the relocation of the Metropolitan Opera, and the complex became more commercially based.

With the development moving forward, John D. Rockefeller Jr. replaced the opera house development with the Rockefeller Center complex; this included a 70-story skyscraper, the RCA Building, which opened in 1933. Young Rockefeller Center architect Wallace Harrison would be approached some 20 years later by officers of the New York Philharmonic Society and the Met to develop a new home for both institutions.

As chief architect again for the development of Lincoln Center, Harrison was chosen to design the new opera house, to be built as the centerpiece of the new performing arts complex- a twenty-five acre, eighteen block site on the Upper West Side, chosen by Robert Moses as a major urban renewal and slum clearance project. After a long process of redesigns, revisions, and opposing interests (provided by the Met wanting a more traditional design for its home, and the conflicting wishes of the architects of the other Lincoln Center venues), construction of Harrison's forty-third design of the Metropolitan Opera House began in the winter of 1963, the last of the three major Lincoln Center venues to be completed. Construction delays due to the finishing of the neighboring New York State Theatre (in time with the opening of the 1964 World's Fair), resulted in the excavation site being nicknamed "Lake Bing" after then-Met General Manager Rudolf Bing.

Although the house would not officially open for several more months, the first public performance at the new Metropolitan Opera House was a performance of Giacomo Puccini's La fanciulla del West on April 11, 1966, with Beverly Bower as Minnie, Gaetano Bardini as Dick Johnson and Cesare Bardelli as Jack Rance. The production was attended by 3,000 high school students, and began with the playing of the National Anthem and a series of sound tests that included a loud chord from the orchestra, and a blast from a shotgun. The new building officially opened on September 16, 1966, with the world premiere of Samuel Barber's Antony and Cleopatra, directed and designed by Franco Zeffirelli and choreographed by Alvin Ailey starring Leontyne Price as Cleopatra with Thomas Schippers conducting.

=== Performances and uses ===
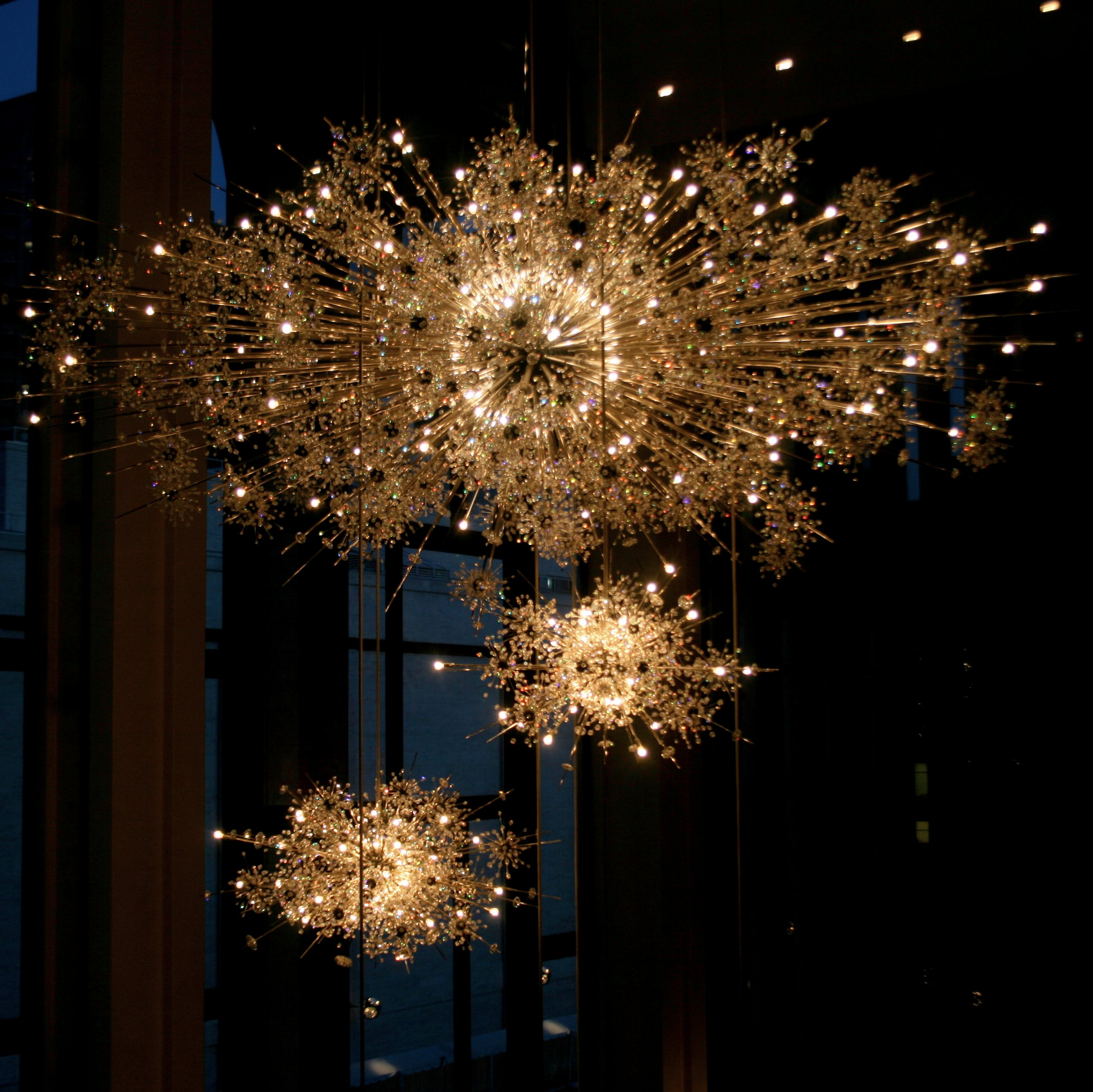
Lobby chandeliers

The Met is one of the most technologically advanced stages in the world. Its vast array of hydraulic elevators, motorized stages, and rigging systems have made possible the staging requirements of grand opera in repertory and have made possible complex productions such as Franco Zeffirelli's 1981 production of La bohème, as well as productions of mammoth operas, including Prokofiev's War and Peace, Verdi's Aida and Wagner's four-part, 16-hour Der Ring des Nibelungen. The Met stage has also been home to numerous world premieres of operas, including John Corigliano's The Ghosts of Versailles, Philip Glass's The Voyage and the US premiere of Nico Muhly's Two Boys in 2013.

When the Metropolitan Opera is on hiatus, the Opera House is home to the annual Spring season of American Ballet Theatre (ABT). It regularly hosts touring opera and ballet companies including the Kirov, Bolshoi, and the La Scala companies. In addition, the Met has presented recitals by Vladimir Horowitz, Renée Fleming, Kathleen Battle, and others. Philip Glass's Einstein on the Beach was staged independently at the Met in 1976. Concerts by Barbra Streisand, The Who, Paul McCartney and others have been successful as well.

Several notable non-operatic performances occurred in 1986. On July 8, a gala fund raiser performance to benefit ABT and Paris Opera Ballet saw the first joint performance in over ten years of ABT artistic director Mikhail Baryshnikov and Paris Opera Ballet Director Rudolf Nureyev. On August 9 and 10, comedian Robin Williams recorded performances that were shown on HBO and released on compact disc under the title Robin Williams Live at the Met. On October 19, Herbert von Karajan and the Berlin Philharmonic were scheduled during their North American tour for a matinee concert at the Opera House, but Karajan had fallen ill, and was replaced by James Levine.

The opera house has been featured in a number of movies and television programs, including the climax of Norman Jewison's 1987 film Moonstruck. In addition to regular Metropolitan Opera radio and television broadcasts, several other television programs have been produced at the Metropolitan Opera House including Danny Kaye's Look-In at the Metropolitan Opera (CBS, 1975) and Sills and Burnett at the Met (CBS, 1976). In 1999 and 2001, the Opera House was the venue for the MTV Video Music Awards.

As of May 2017, its 50th anniversary, the Metropolitan Opera House had hosted over 11,000 performances and 164 separate operas (67 of them added after the Met moved to the current building), with 251 productions having been created there. James Levine had conducted 2,583 of the Opera House's 11,000 performances; Charles Anthony had sung there 2,296 times; and The Three Tenors had performed there a combined 1,298 times. Additionally, the Met had broadcast 1,931 performances on live radio, 198 on television, and 109 for movie theaters.

== Architecture ==
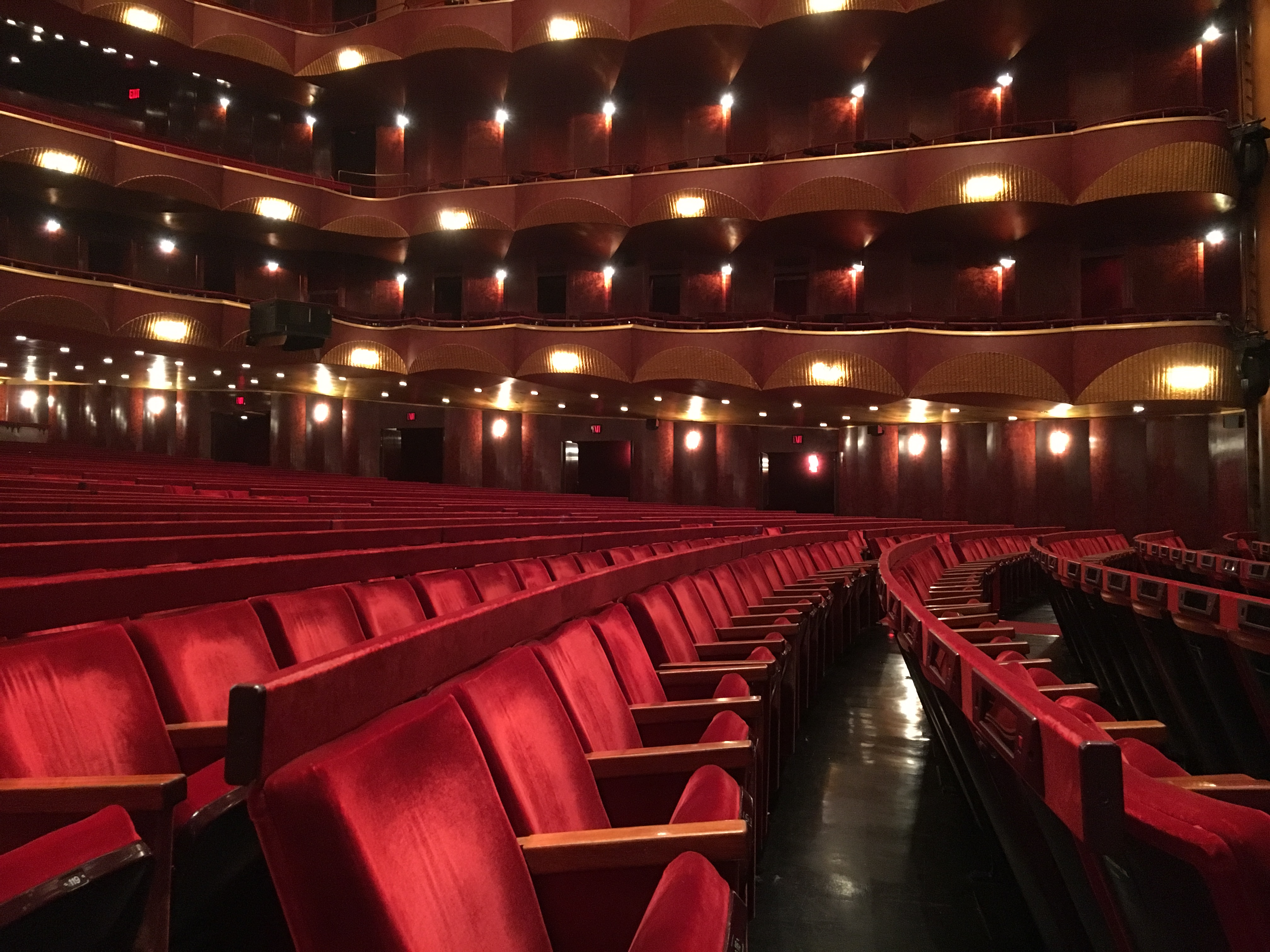
The auditorium

Situated at the western end of Lincoln Center Plaza, the Metropolitan Opera House faces Columbus Avenue and Broadway and forms an axis with Philip Johnson's David Koch Theater (formerly the New York State Theater) and David Geffen Hall (formerly Philharmonic Hall, and then Avery Fisher Hall), designed by Max Abramovitz, with the plaza's fountain at the center. Although west–east roads do not run through Lincoln Center itself, the Metropolitan Opera House is parallel to the block from West 63rd Street to West 64th Street. The rear of the House meets Amsterdam Avenue, and extends to the plaza entrance.

=== Facade ===
The building is clad in white travertine and the east facade is graced with its distinctive series of five concrete arches and large glass and bronze facade, towering 96 feet above the plaza. On the north, south, and west sides of the building, hundreds of vertical fins of travertine running the full height of the structure give the impression that the facade is an uninterrupted mass of travertine when viewed from certain angles. The building totals 14 stories, 5 of which are underground.

=== Interior ===
==== Lobby ====
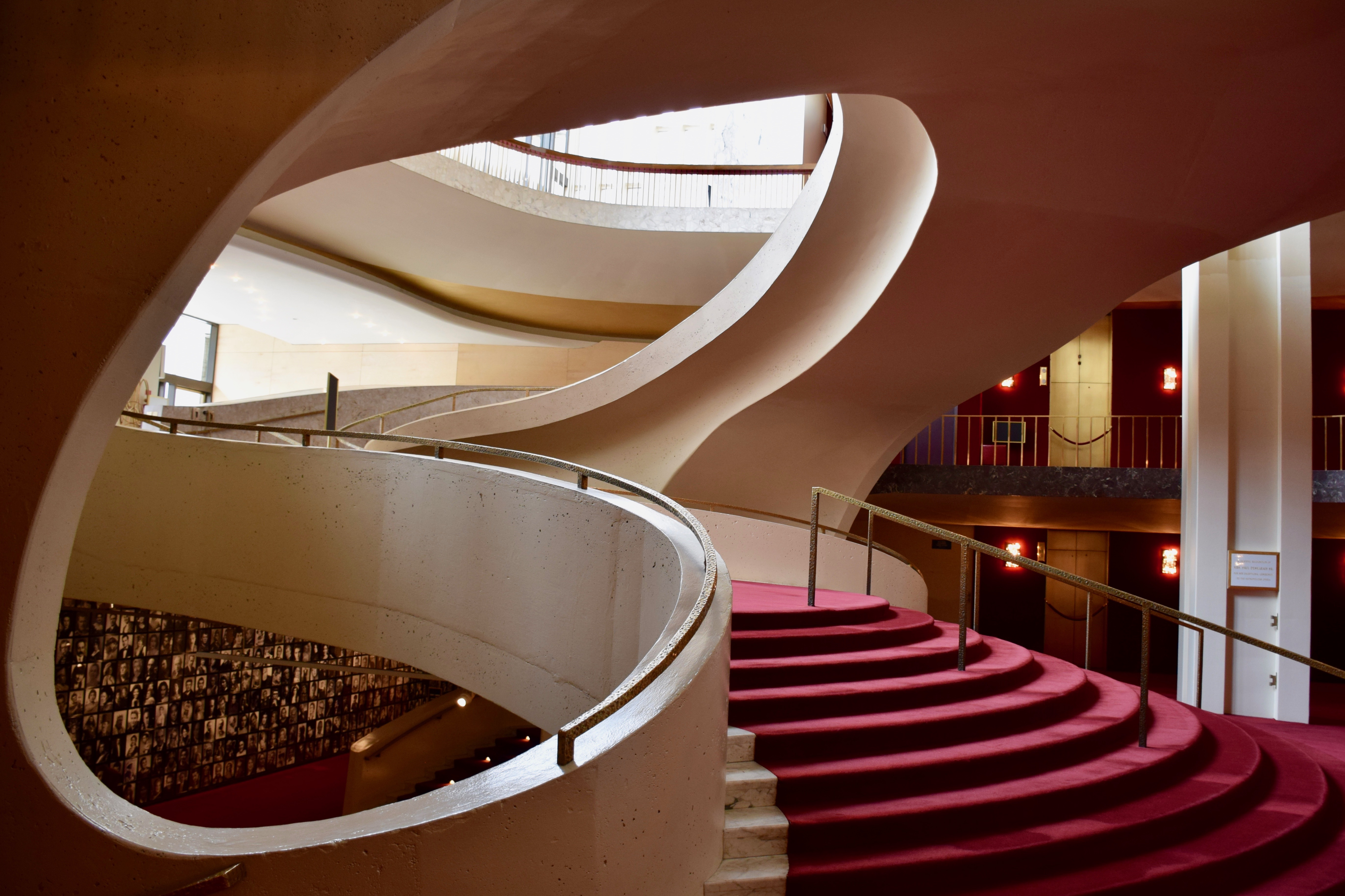
Main staircase

On display in the lobby, and visible to the outside plaza, are two murals created for the space by Marc Chagall, The Sources of Music and The Triumph of Music. The murals are approximately 30 ft (9.1 m) by 36 ft (11 m). The south wall holds the work entitled The Triumph of Music while the north wall contains The Sources of Music. In 2009, the Met's board of directors decided to use the paintings as collateral for a long-term loan which previously relied on cash for backing. Some sources estimate the value of the paintings at $20 million. By 2026—when the Metropolitan Opera contemplated selling the Chagall murals to cover a funding deficit—Sotheby's had appraised the works at $55 million.

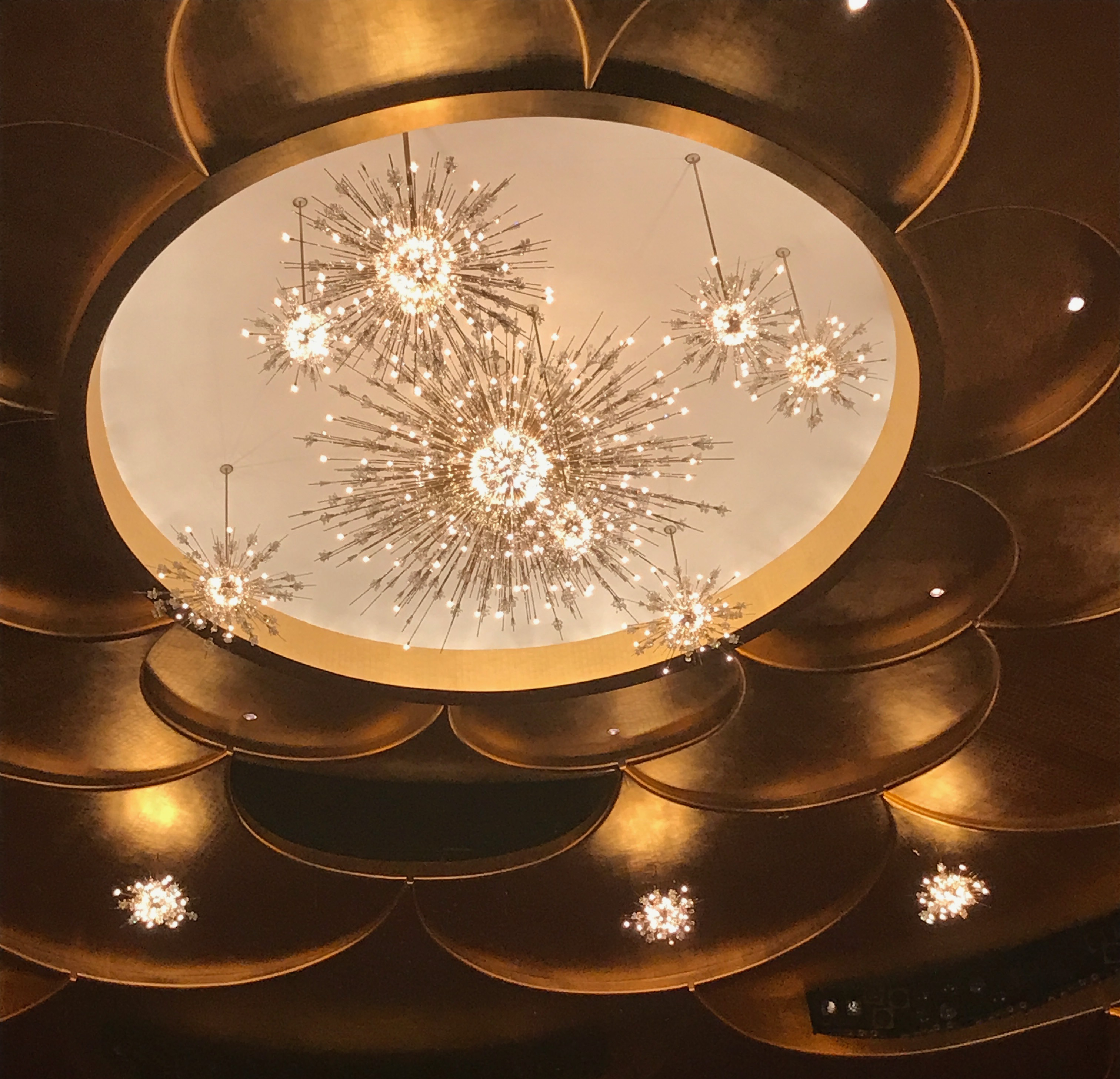
Auditorium chandeliers

The multi-story lobby is dominated by a concrete and terrazzo cantilevered stairway that connects the main level with the lower level lounges and upper floors. The centerpiece of the lobby is an array of eleven "crystal chandeliers resembling constellations with sparkly moons and satellites spraying out in all directions"; the auditorium contains 21 matching chandeliers, the largest of which measures 18 ft (5.5 m) in diameter. The chandeliers were donated by the government of Austria as repayment for American help during the Marshall Plan following World War II, and were designed by Dr. Hans Harald Rath of J. & L. Lobmeyr of Vienna. Twelve of the chandeliers in the auditorium are on motorized winches, and raised to the ceiling prior to performances so as not to obstruct sight lines of the audience on the upper levels.

In 2008 the lobby chandeliers were dismantled and sent to the J & L Lobmeyr workshop in Vienna to be refurbished prior to the Met's 125th anniversary season. Workers re-wired the pieces and replaced any of the 49,000 crystals that were broken or missing. The lobby also contains sculptures by Aristide Maillol and Wilhelm Lehmbruck as well as portraits of notable performers and members of the Met company. 3,000 square feet (280 m^{2}) of velour covers the walls in the front of house spaces, with gold leaf, bronze, Italian marble, and concrete being the architectural surfaces in these spaces. A restaurant occupies space on the Grand Tier level, and spaces for patrons, guild members and the Metropolitan Opera Club exist as well throughout the lobbies.

A restaurant known as "Top of the Met", which occupied a balcony overlooking the plaza and lobbies below was a success upon opening, but closed after low attendance in the mid-1970s. The space was designed by Harrison himself and featured murals by French impressionist Raoul Dufy. Other public spaces in the Opera House were decorated by such interior designers of the time as Angelo Donghia, William Baldwin, and L. Garth Huxtable, husband of then-New York Times architecture critic Ada Louise Huxtable, who upon the opening of the building would famously write, "There is a strong temptation to close the eyes."

==== Auditorium ====
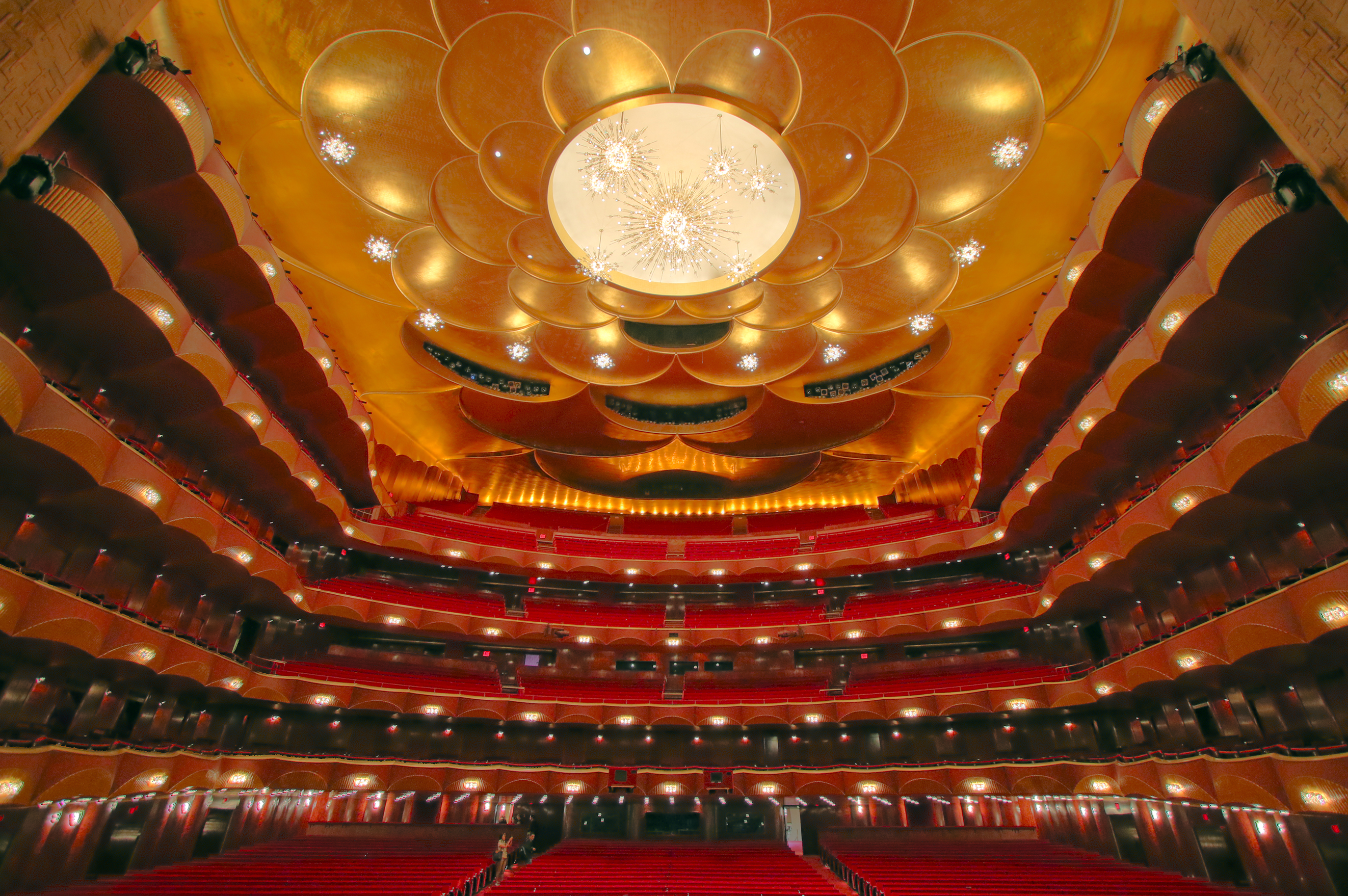
View of auditorium from stage

The auditorium is fan-shaped and decorated in gold and burgundy with seating for 3,794 and 245 standing positions on six levels. Over 4,000 squares of gold leaf cover the domed petal-shaped ceiling from which the 21 crystal chandeliers hang. The walls of the auditorium are paneled in kevazingo bubinga, a rosewood noted for its acoustic quality. The auditorium is known to be acoustically significant—small conversation and quiet moments in music can be heard well at the top of the Family Circle some 146 feet (45 m) away from the stage. As a result, the Opera House is the only Lincoln Center auditorium that has not been rebuilt because of acoustic problems. The square gold proscenium is 54 ft (16 m) wide and 54 ft (16 m) high. The main curtain of custom-woven gold damask, a gift of the Metropolitan Opera Club, is the largest tab curtain in the world. Above the proscenium is an untitled bronze sculpture by Mary Callery. The orchestra pit is very large and open to the auditorium, with the capacity for up to 110 musicians.

The stage complex is one of the largest and most complex of its kind in the world, extending 80 ft (24 m) deep from the curtain line to the rear wall. The overall dimensions of the stage with wing space are 90 ft (27 m) deep and 103 ft (31 m) wide. The stage contains 7 hydraulic elevators that are 60 ft (18 m) wide, with double decks; three slipstages (large spaces on either side of and behind the main stage, each capable of holding a complete stage setting), the upstage one containing a 60 ft (18 m) diameter turntable; 103 motorized battens (linesets) for overhead lifting; and two 100 ft (30 m)-tall fully enveloping cycloramas.

The large and highly mechanized stage and support space smoothly facilitates the rotating presentation of up to four different opera productions each week. The auditorium occupies a fourth of the building's interior area; massive storage spaces below the stage allow for production storage within the opera house, and large workshops for scenery construction, costumes, wigs, and electric equipment, as well as kitchens, offices, an employee canteen, and dressing room spaces for the principals, chorus, supernumeraries, ballet, and children's chorus surround the stage complex on multiple floors. Two large rehearsal halls (situated three floors below the stage) have nearly the dimensions of the Main Stage, allowing for blocking rehearsals, and space for full orchestra setups.
