= Bouquet près de la fenêtre =

1959–1960 painting by Marc Chagall

- Bouquet by the Window
- Artist: Marc Chagall
- Year: 1959–1960
- Medium: Oil on canvas
- Dimensions: 149.8 cm × 120 cm (59.0 in × 47 in)
- Location: Private collection

Bouquet près de la fenêtre (English: Bouquet by the Window) is an oil on canvas painting by Marc Chagall, from 1959–1960. Franz Meyer, Chagall's biographer (and son-in-law), called it one of Chagall's finest flower paintings.

The lovers in the painting are Chagall and his second wife Valentina Brodsky. His first wife and the great love of his life, Bella Rosenfeld, floats in the upper-left as a ghostly apparition dressed in bridal white. The view in the foreground is of Saint-Paul-de-Vence, near where Chagall settled the last four decades of his life.

The painting fetched £3,218,500 at a Christie's auction, in London, on 23 June 2015.

== See also ==
- List of artworks by Marc Chagall
