= Le Clown au Cirque =

1980 painting by Marc Chagall

- Artist: Marc Chagall
- Year: 1980
- Medium: tempera and pen and ink on board
- Dimensions: 46 cm × 54.6 cm (18 in × 21.5 in)
- Owner: Private collection

Le Clown au Cirque (English: The Clown at the Circus) is a tempera and pen-and-ink painting on board created by Belarusian-French artist Marc Chagall, in 1980. It is held in a private collection.

== Description ==
The painting depicts floating clowns amid the circus ring in the middle of the performance. The subject of circus was dear to the artist. Chagall often returned to the circus as a subject matter in his artworks. He considered clowns, acrobats and actors as tragically human beings who are like characters in certain religious paintings.

== Provenance ==
- Chalk & Vermilion Fine Art, Greenwich
- Coast Galleries, Carmel
- Private Collection, Ohio (acquired in 2000)
- Weinstein Gallery, San Francisco
- Private Collection (acquired in 2015)

== See also ==
- List of artworks by Marc Chagall
