= Bella with White Collar =

Painting by Marc Chagall

- Artist: Marc Chagall
- Year: 1917
- Medium: Oil on canvas
- Dimensions: 149 cm × 72 cm (59 in × 28 in)
- Location: Musée National d'Art Moderne, Paris

Bella with White Collar (French: Bella au col blanc) is a painting done by Belarusian-French artist Marc Chagall in 1917. It is a portrait of Bella Rosenfeld Chagall, Chagall's wife at the time. The two tiny figures at the bottom are thought to represent the artist and the couple's daughter, Ida. The painting is currently kept at the Musée National d'Art Moderne, in Paris.

== See also ==
- List of artworks by Marc Chagall
