= Apocalypse in Lilac, Capriccio =

1945 painting by Marc Chagall

- Artist: Marc Chagall
- Year: 1945
- Medium: gouache
- Dimensions: 51 cm × 35.5 cm (20 in × 14.0 in)
- Location: Ben Uri Gallery & Museum, London, England

Apocalypse in Lilac, Capriccio is a gouache painting by the Russian-born artist Marc Chagall, from 1945. The 51 by 35.5 cm (20-inch by 14-inch) work was created by Chagall in response to the devastation brought by the Holocaust. It references Jesus Christ, like some others of his paintings of this time.

== Description ==
Its imagery consists of a crucified Jesus, wearing tefillin screaming at a Nazi storm trooper, while other acts of violence – another crucifixion, a man being hanged and an adult male stabbing a child – can be seen in the background while an inverted clock falls out of the sky.

== Overview ==
Chagall kept the painting in his personal collection. It was initially sold by the artist's son in 1985 to a private collector in France. In October 2009, it was purchased by the Ben Uri Gallery & Museum for US$43,000, despite estimates after the historical context correctly understood and researched by Ben Uri was released and recognised by the international community that it could be worth more than $1.5 million, and was publicly displayed for the first time in January 2010.

== See also ==
- List of artworks by Marc Chagall
- 1945 in art
