= Soleil dans le ciel de Saint-Paul =

Painting by Marc Chagall

- Sun in the Sky of Saint-Paul (English)
- Artist: Marc Chagall
- Year: 1983
- Medium: Oil on canvas
- Dimensions: 73 cm × 115.5 cm (29 in × 45.5 in)
- Owner: Private collection

Soleil dans le ciel de Saint-Paul (English: Sun in the Sky of Saint-Paul) is an in oil on canvas painting by Belarusian-French artist Marc Chagall, from 1983. It is held in a private collection.

== The painting ==
The painting depicts the recognisable view of Saint-Paul-de-Vence, one of the oldest medieval towns on the French Riviera, dominated by the church at its top. The work is particularly rich in color and has a very balanced composition. The blue sky above the town contains a large, bright yellow Sun as well as various other elements from the artist's iconography – animals, musicians, and the flying couple.

By juxtaposing this imagery, Soleil dans le ciel de Saint-Paul combines Chagall's love of his Mediterranean home with his characteristic dream-like pictorial vision. With its free-flowing style and bright, translucent colours, the work exemplifies the effect that the south of France had on Chagall's art. ‘The Southern French landscape has astonished Chagall with its wealth of colours and its lyrical atmosphere, had captivated him with the beauty of its flowers and foliage. These impressions found their way into his paintings of that period, refined their peinture and lent them a hitherto unknown radiance’.

With its fantastical, dream-like composition, the painting becomes an expression of the artist's internal feelings and souvenirs rather than an objective projection of the outside world and of the familiar landscape. As such, Chagall's paintings defy symbolic meaning and categorisation. In particular, his dreamscapes resist interpretation despite the ubiquity of repeated pictorial symbols; through repetition they become both familiar and meaningless, manifestations of a rich and colourful imagination that can be understood not through intellect but through intuition. As the artist himself proclaimed: ‘For me a picture is a surface covered with representations of things (objects, animals, human beings) in a certain order in which logic and illustration have no importance. The visual effect of the composition is what is paramount’.

== Legacy ==
“Soleil dans le ciel de Saint Paul” by Valentino, embroidery of golden kite on chord colored sheepskin

The painting served as inspiration for an ensemble from the Valentino Haute Couture Spring/Summer 2015 Show. Chagall's Russian ancestry provided a leitmotif for the embellishments that are central to the designer's aesthetic.

== See also ==
- List of artworks by Marc Chagall
- 1983 in art
