= Chase Tower (Chicago) =

Office skyscraper in Chicago, Illinois

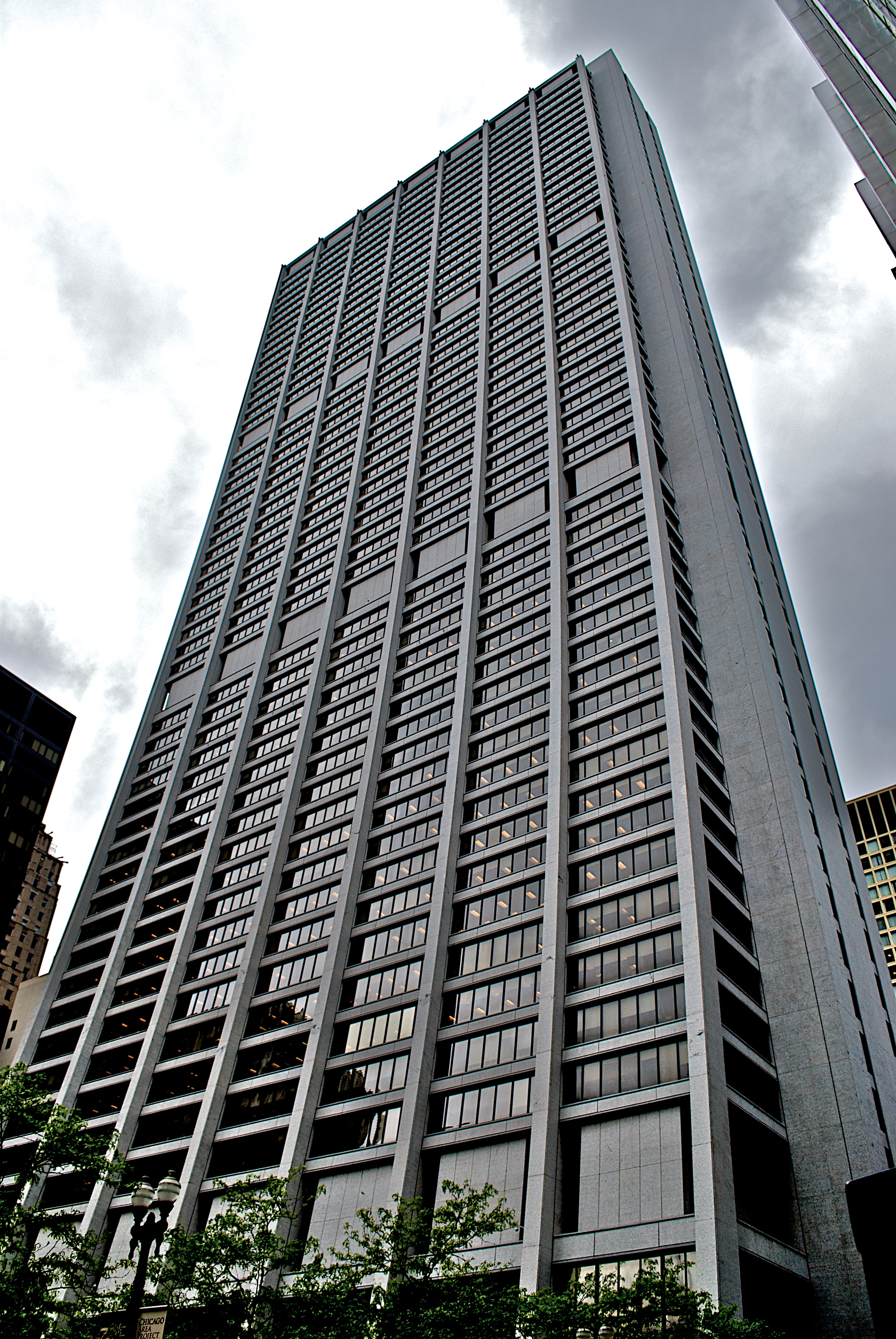
- Chase Tower in May 2010

- Location within Chicago metropolitan area Location within Illinois Location within the United States

General information
- Location: 10 Dearborn St., Chicago, Illinois, U.S.
- Coordinates: 41.8816°N 87.6301°W
- Construction started: 1964
- Completed: 1969

Height
- Roof: 850 ft (260 m)

Technical details
- Floor count: 60
- Floor area: 2,199,982 ft^{2} (204,385.0 m^{2})

Design and construction
- Architects: C.F. Murphy Associates, Perkins and Will

Chase Tower is a 60-story skyscraper in The Loop community area of Chicago, Illinois, United States.

Completed in 1969, it is located at 10 South Dearborn Street. At 850 feet (259 m) tall, it is the fifteenth-tallest building in Chicago and the tallest building inside the Chicago 'L' Loop elevated tracks, and, as of July 2026, the 73rd-tallest in the United States. JPMorgan Chase has its U.S. and Canada commercial and retail banking headquarters here. The building is also the headquarters of Exelon. The building and its plaza (known as Exelon Plaza) occupy the entire block bounded by Clark, Dearborn, Madison, and Monroe streets.

== History ==
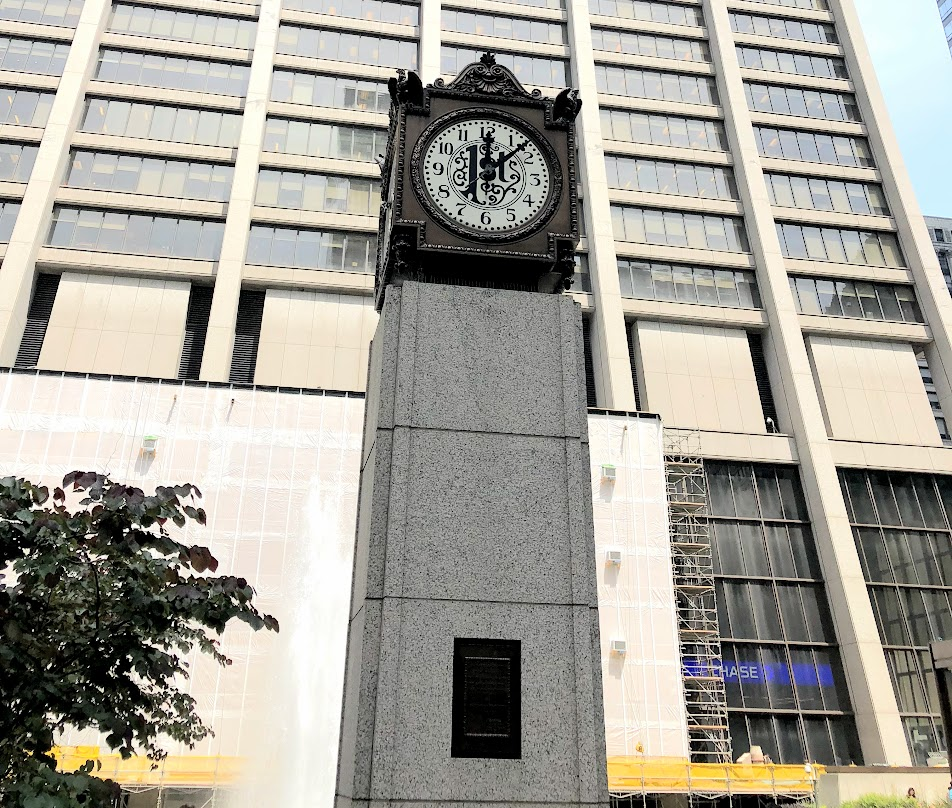
The First Chicago Bank clock in Chase Tower's Exelon Plaza

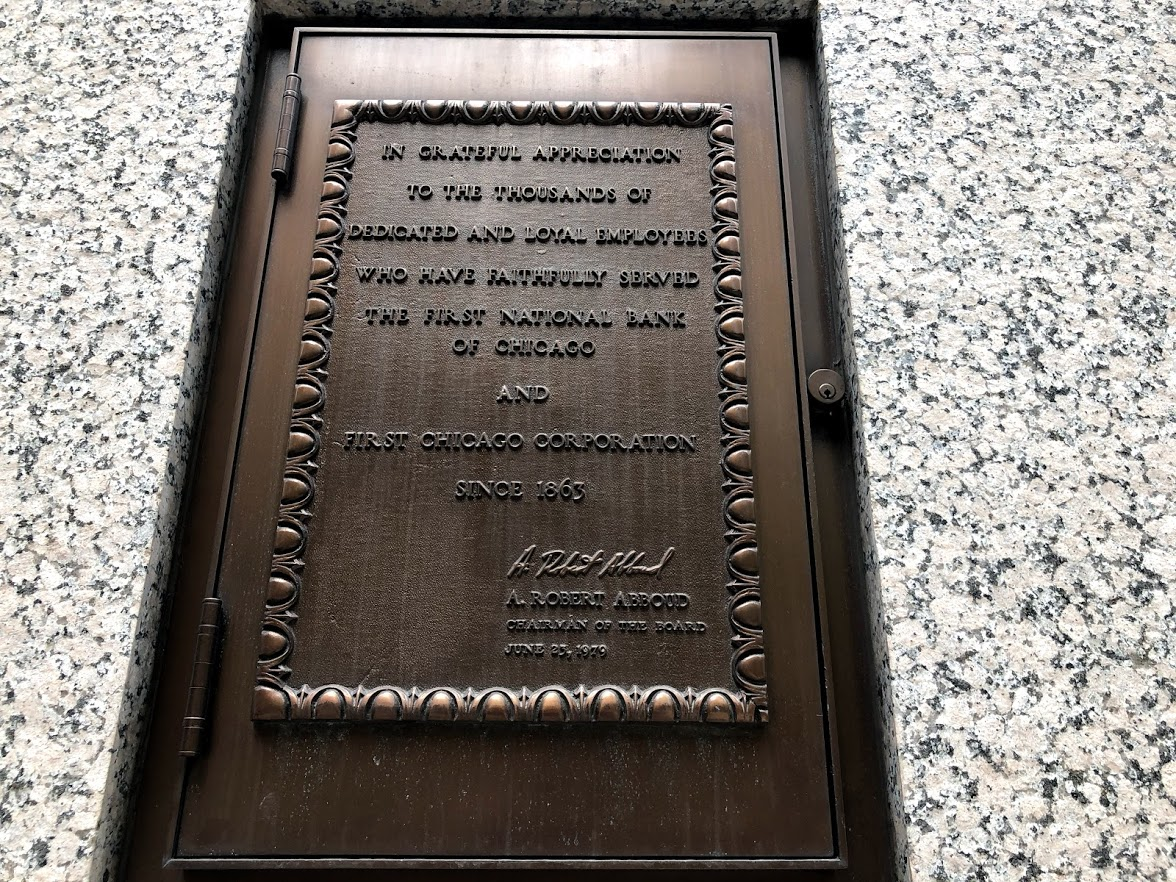
First Chicago Bank plaque below the clock in Exelon Plaza

Before the building was constructed, the Morrison Hotel, on its former site, was demolished in 1965. The tower was developed as part of a broader initiative to modernize Chicago’s financial district in the post-war era and consolidate the operations of the First National Bank of Chicago into a contemporary headquarters complex. It first opened in 1969 as First National Plaza, serving as the headquarters of First Chicago Corporation and, at its completion, was among the tallest reinforced concrete buildings in the world.

In 1998, the building became the headquarters for Bank One Corporation and was accordingly renamed Bank One Tower. The current name dates from October 24, 2005, one year after Bank One was acquired by Chase. Chase’s retail bank division is based in the tower.

The tower’s lower levels historically included an on-site cafeteria and food court area commonly known as the Urban Market, which provided dining options for tenants and visitors. Over time, changes in security practices and office use patterns resulted in the cafeteria space being primarily available to building tenants and authorized guests rather than the general public, aligning access with internal building operations and credentialing.

For a time, from 2006 to 2022, the National Public Radio show Wait Wait... Don't Tell Me! was taped on Thursday nights before a live audience at the Chase Auditorium beneath the plaza. In 2022, the show permanently moved to the Fine Arts Building.

On February 26, 2024, JPMorgan Chase unveiled major renovation plans for Chase Tower, marking the building’s first significant overhaul in more than two decades. The company described a transformation of the 850-foot, 60-story headquarters into a modern workplace with refreshed public and common spaces, updated dining and amenity areas, and improved infrastructure and building systems; the project is designed to support flexible and collaborative work and reinforce the firm’s long-term commitment to Chicago’s central business district. The renovation plans include enhancements to the outdoor plaza (known as Exelon Plaza) and public art access, a refreshed lobby and mezzanine, an updated food hall and collaboration areas, new fitness and wellness facilities, and upgraded office infrastructure. Work began in 2024; for the renovations Chase is partnering with Gensler, a global design and architecture firm headquartered in San Francisco, which is the largest architecture firm in the world. The full renovation is expected to be completed in late 2027 at a total estimated cost of over $800 million.

== Design and features ==
Design architects for the construction were C.F. Murphy Associates, Stanislaw Z. Gladych and Perkins and Will. Chase Tower is known for both its distinctive curving shape and its vibrant public space: a deep sunken plaza at the geographic center of the Chicago Loop, complete with a jet fountain and Marc Chagall's ceramic wall mural Four Seasons.

The ground floor is home to the largest Chase Bank branch in Chicago with 22 ATMs.

== See also ==
- List of tallest buildings in the United States
- List of tallest buildings in Chicago
- World's tallest structures
- List of tallest buildings in the world

== Position in Chicago's skyline ==
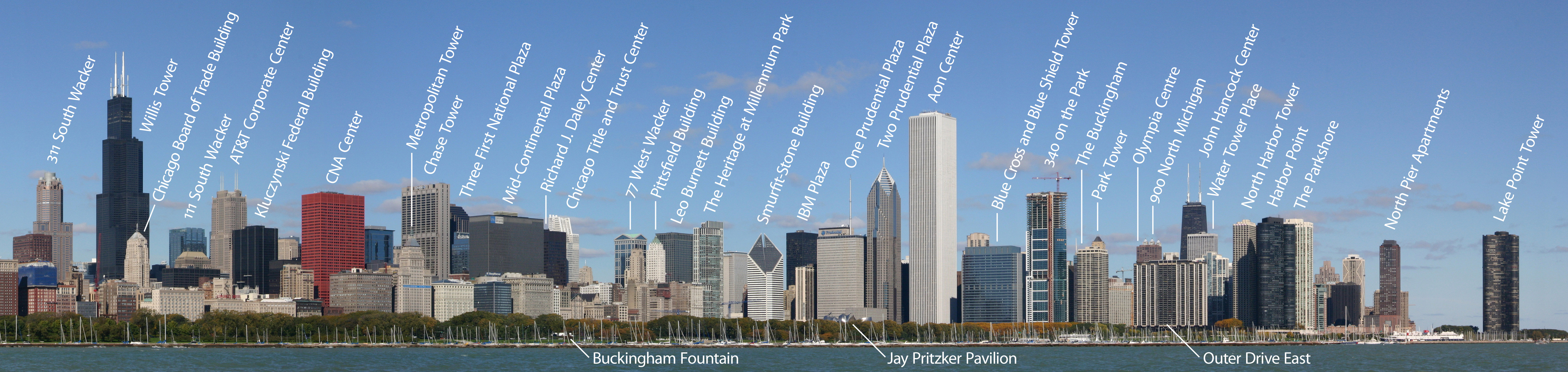
