= Musée Marc Chagall =

Monographic art museum in France

Marc Chagall National Museum
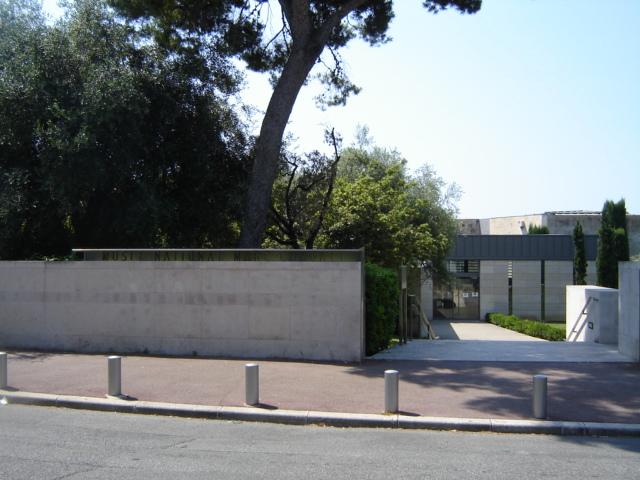

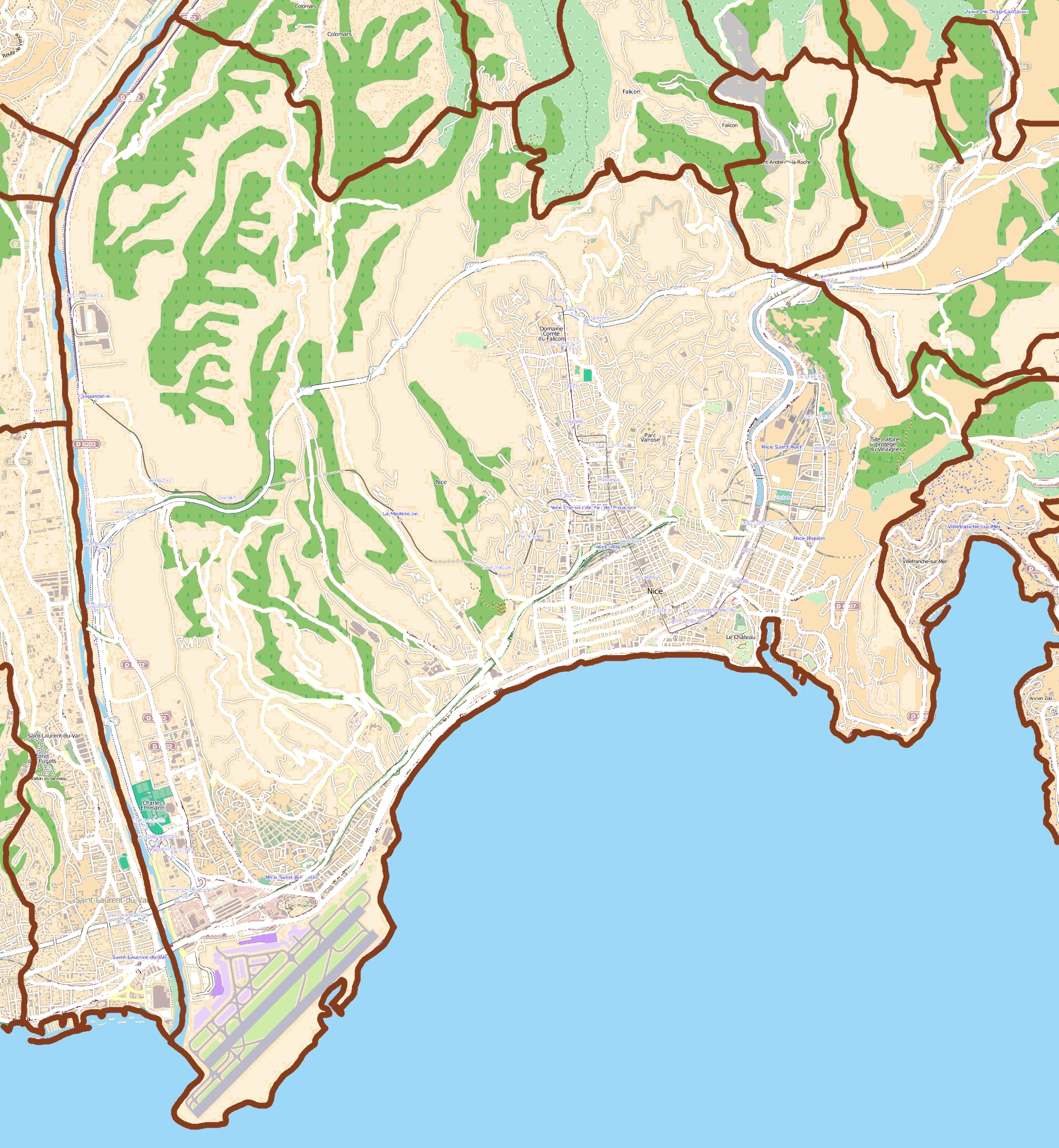
- Location within Nice
- Established: 1973
- Location: Avenue Docteur Ménard; 06000 Nice, France
- Coordinates: 43.709167°N 7.269536°E
- Type: Art museum
- Website: www.musee-chagall.fr/

The Marc Chagall National Museum (Chagall Biblical Message) is a French national museum dedicated to the work of painter Marc Chagall – particularly his works inspired by religion – located in Nice in the Alpes-Maritimes.

== History ==
The museum was created during the lifetime of the artist, with the support of the Minister of Culture André Malraux, and inaugurated in 1973. It is also known as the "National Museum Marc Chagall Biblical Message" ("Musée national message biblique Marc Chagall") as it houses the series of seventeen paintings illustrating the biblical message, painted by Chagall and offered to the French State in 1966. This series illustrates the books of Genesis, Exodus and the Song of Songs.

Chagall himself provided detailed instructions about the creation of the garden by Henri Fish, and decided the place of each of his works in the museum. The chronological order of the works was not followed. Chagall created the mosaic which overlooks the pond and the blue stained glass windows that decorate the concert hall; he also wanted an annual exhibition to be held on a topic related to the spiritual and religious history of the world.

As the collection has grown, what was a museum illustrating the theme Biblical message has become a monographic museum dedicated to Chagall's works of religious and spiritual inspiration. In 1972, the artist gave the museum all the preparatory sketches for Message Biblique. In 1986, the museum acquired, in lieu of inheritance taxes, the complete drawings and gouaches painted to depict the Exodus and ten other paintings, including the triptych Résistance, Résurrection, Libération. Other acquisitions complemented the museum's collections, which now has one of the largest collection of works by Marc Chagall.

== Temporary exhibitions ==
- Denis Castellas, June-October 2014.
- Makiko Furuichi, January-April 2023.

== See also ==
- List of artworks by Marc Chagall
- List of single-artist museums
- Marc Chagall Museum
