= Four Seasons (Chagall) =

Mosaic by Marc Chagall

Coordinates: 41.8811°N 87.6298°W

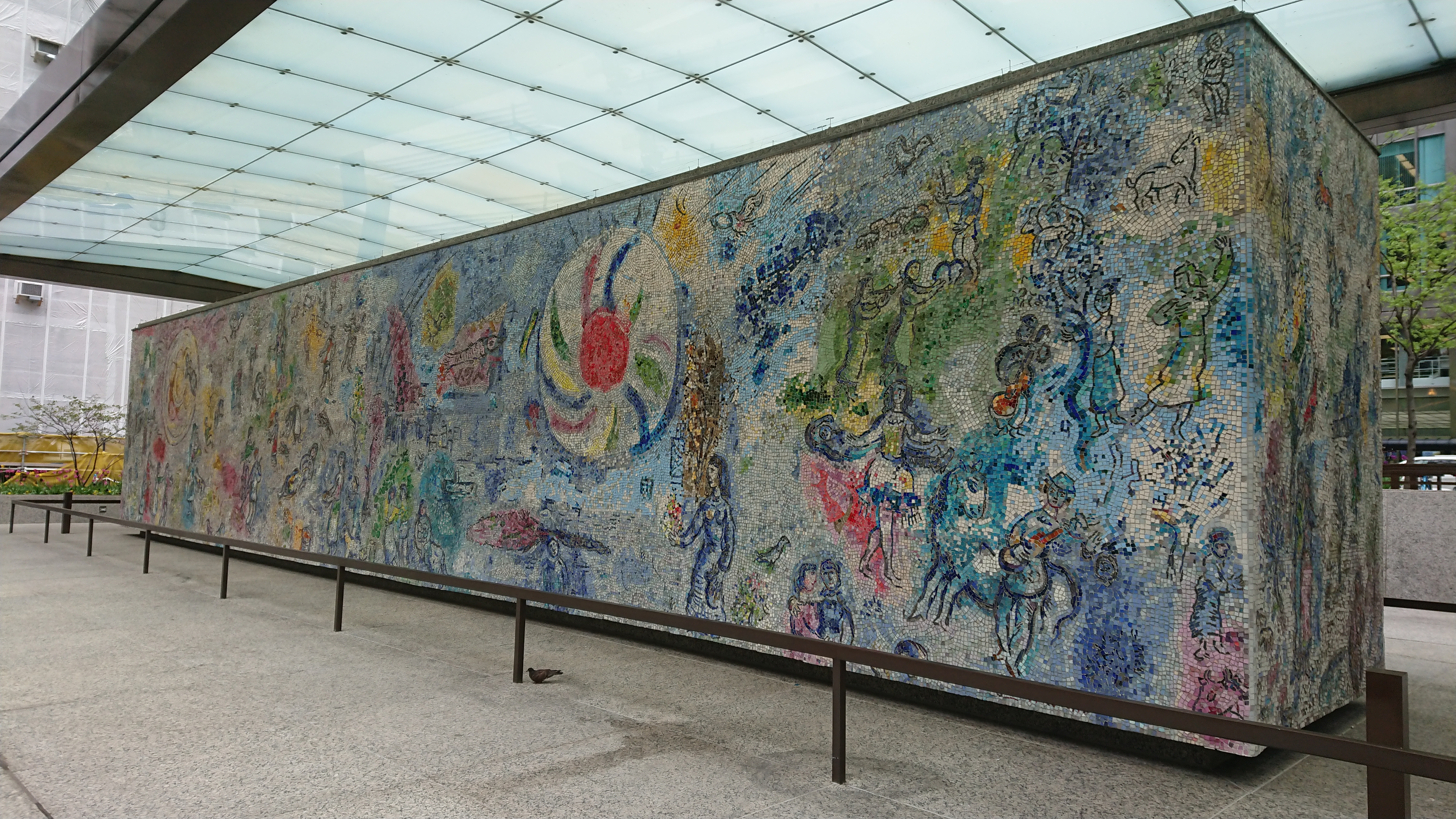
- Artist: Marc Chagall
- Year: 1974
- Location: Chase Tower Plaza, Chicago

Four Seasons is a 1974 mosaic by Marc Chagall that is located in Chase Tower Plaza in the Loop district of Chicago, Illinois. The mosaic was a gift to the City of Chicago by Frederick H. Prince (via the Prince Charitable Trusts); it is wrapped around four sides of a 70 feet (21 m) long, 14 feet (4.3 m) high, 10 feet (3.0 m) wide rectangular box, and was dedicated on September 27, 1974. It was renovated in 1994 and a protective glass canopy was installed.

The mosaic was the subject of a 1974 documentary film, The Gift: Four Seasons Mosaic of Marc Chagall, directed by Chuck Olin.

== See also ==
- List of artworks by Marc Chagall
- List of public art in Chicago
