= White Crucifixion =

1938 painting by Marc Chagall

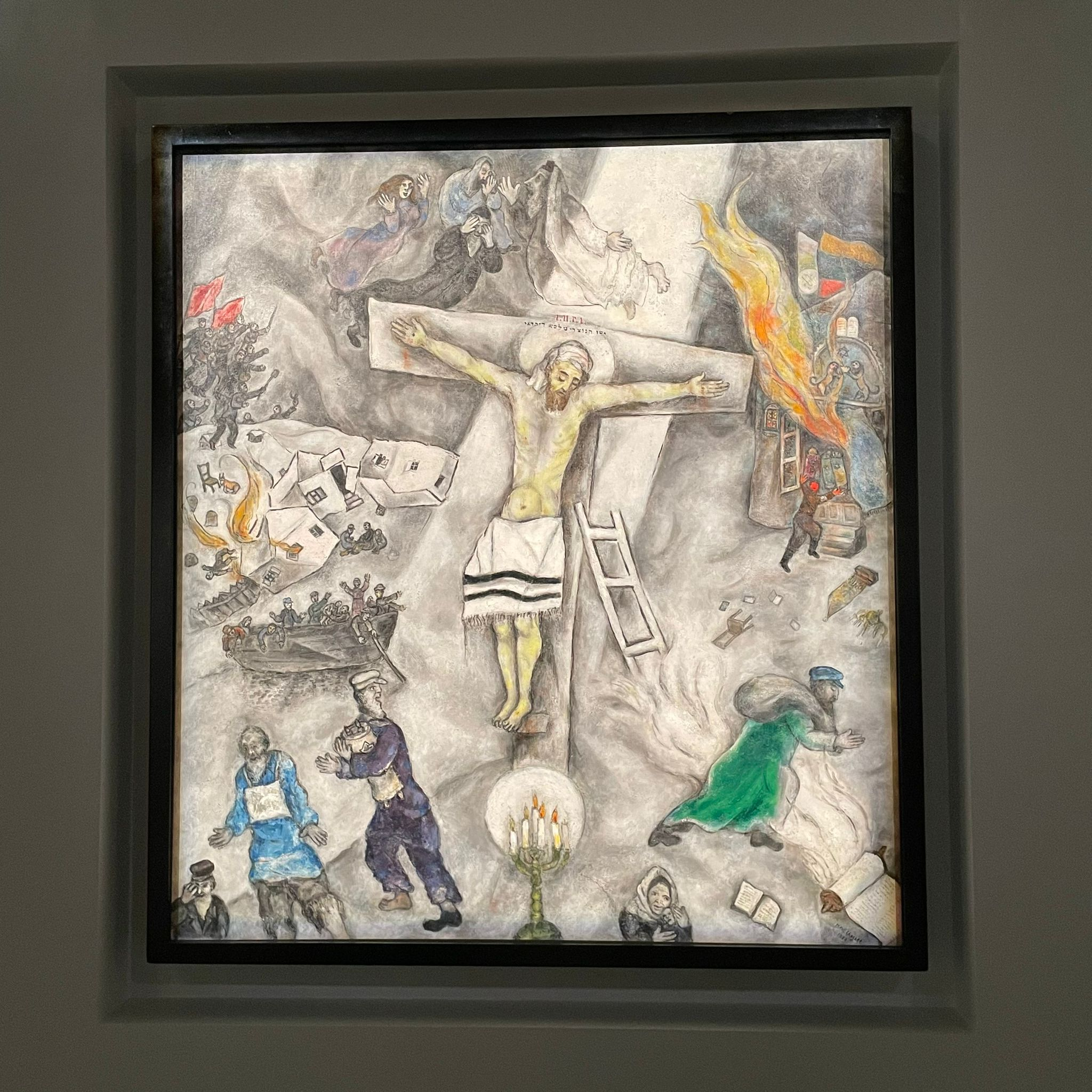
- Artist: Marc Chagall
- Year: 1938
- Medium: Oil on canvas
- Dimensions: 154.62 cm × 140 cm (60.87 in × 55 in)
- Location: Art Institute of Chicago; Chicago

The White Crucifixion is a painting by Marc Chagall depicting the Crucifixion of Jesus. It was painted in 1938 and is now in the permanent collection of the Art Institute of Chicago.

== Description ==
The painting emphasizes the suffering of Jesus and the Jewish people. At the sides violent acts against Jews occur such as the burning of a synagogue and invaders. And in the center, Jesus is shown crucified wearing a prayer shawl as a symbol that he is Jewish. The work is startling as the crucifixion, often seen by the Jewish people as a symbol of oppression, is instead being used to represent their suffering.

Many of Chagall's paintings could be described as lively, romantic, humorous, imaginative, and filled with brilliant colors, but the White Crucifixion is largely drained of color. Chagall painted it in 1938 while living in Paris, in response to the horrifying events of Kristallnacht, the "Night of Broken Glass," an anti-Jewish pogrom of official decree by propaganda minister Joseph Goebbels in Nazi Germany (including Austria and Sudetenland) from the 9th until 10 November 1938.

A green figure carrying a bundle is shown crossing the foreground. This figure, who appears in several of Chagall's works, has been interpreted as being either a Jewish wanderer from Yiddish tradition or the Prophet Elijah.

Two changes were made by Chagall to the work, a swastika on the armband of the soldier burning the synagogue was overpainted as well as the words "Ich bin Jude" on a placard around the neck of a man.

There is also a Lithuanian flag in the upper right hand of the painting. Chagall was from Vitebsk, a town that was in the Russian Empire before the First World War and since 1918 has been in Belarus. Because he was a Jew from the territory that was once in the Grand Duchy of Lithuania, his cultural background was that of a Litvak. However, he never lived in the modern state of Lithuania, which was established in February 1918 and a few weeks later adopted the flag shown in the painting. In the upper left hand portion of the painting there are the red flags of communism, which was militantly anti-religious and opposed the use of Hebrew for any purpose.

== Reception ==
Pope Francis, a well-established ally and friend of the Jewish people, considered the painting to be his favorite.

== See also ==
- List of artworks by Marc Chagall
