= Le Grand Cirque (1956 painting) =

Painting by Marc Chagall

Le Grand Cirque (1956)
- The Big Circus (English)
- Artist: Marc Chagall
- Year: 1956
- Medium: Oil on canvas
- Dimensions: 159.5 cm × 308.5 cm (62.8 in × 121.5 in)
- Owner: Private Collection

Le Grand Cirque is an oil and gouache on canvas painting by Belarusian-French artist Marc Chagall created in 1956. it is held in a private collection.

== Description ==
The canvas features acrobats, trapeze artists and clowns. The subject of circus was dear to the artist. Chagall often returned to the circus as a subject matter in his artworks. He considered clowns, acrobats and actors as tragically human beings who are like characters in certain religious paintings. Among other Post-Impressionist and Modern painters who featured the circus in their works are Georges Seurat, Henri de Toulouse-Lautrec, Pablo Picasso, Georges Rouault, Kees van Dongen, and Fernand Léger.

== Provenance ==
At least until 1974 Le Grand Cirque was in a property of Gustave Stern Foundation, New York. In 2007 the painting was acquired from the Gustave Stern Foundation and Sold at Sotheby's, New York for $13.8 million, becoming a part of private collection in Switzerland. In 2017, the painting was sold for $16 million, to an Asian telephone bidder.

== Exhibitions ==
- Bern, Kunsthalle, Marc Chagall, Oeuvres de 1950 à 1956, 1956, no. 46
- Basel, Kunsthalle, Oeuvres des 25 dernières années, 1956, no. 61
- Paris, Galerie Maeght, Marc Chagall, 1957, no. 5
- Brussels, Palais des Beaux-Arts & Amsterdam, Stedelijk Museum, L'oeuvre des dernières années, 1956–57, no. 147
- Hamburg, Kunstverein im Hamburg; Munich, Haus der Kunst & Paris, Musée des Arts Décoratifs, Marc Chagall, 1959, no. 166, illustrated in the catalogue
- Paris, Musée des arts décoratifs, Exposition Marc Chagall, 1959, no. 174
- South Bend, Indiana, University of Notre Dame Art Gallery, 1965
- Saint-Paul-de-Vence, Fondation Maeght, Hommage à Marc Chagall, 1967, no. 46, illustrated in the catalogue
- Zürich, Kunsthaus (on loan)
- Jerusalem, The Israel Museum, Chagall in Israel, 2002-03

== See also ==
- List of artworks by Marc Chagall
- 1956 in art
