= The Sources of Music and The Triumph of Music =

Murals by Marc Chagall

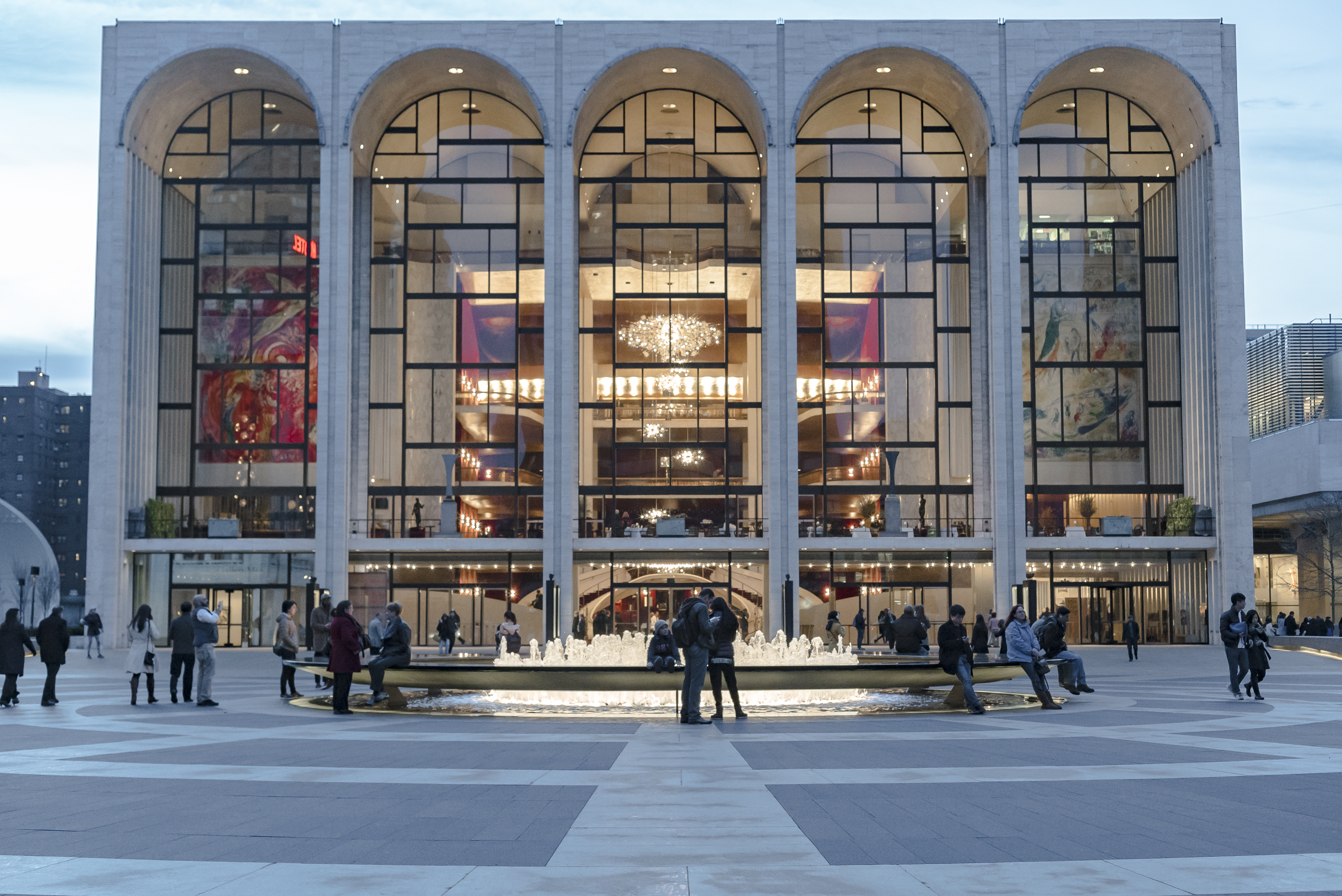
- The murals can be seen behind the outer windows; Triumph (left), Sources (right)
- Artist: Marc Chagall
- Year: 1966
- Location: New York City
- Owner: Metropolitan Opera House

The Sources of Music and The Triumph of Music are two murals that Marc Chagall painted in 1966 for the Metropolitan Opera House at the Lincoln Center in New York City.

Following a commission by the opera for Chagall's set and costume design for Mozart's The Magic Flute for its inaugural season, the murals were created for the lobby of the opera house, and are visible to the outside plaza. The murals are approximately 30 ft (9.1 m) by 36 ft (11 m). The south wall holds the work entitled The Triumph of Music and the north wall, The Sources of Music. Chagall had intended the reverse of this arrangement.

The director of the Metropolitan Opera, Rudolf Bing, is depicted in one of the murals playing a mandolin. The composer Wolfgang Amadeus Mozart is depicted in The Triumph of Music, flying above Manhattan and interacting with characters from his opera The Magic Flute.

== Collateral ==
In 2009, the Met's board of directors decided to use the paintings as collateral for a long-term loan which previously relied on cash for backing. Some sources estimate the value of the paintings at $20 million, but Sotheby's valued them at $55 million by 2026. The murals were put up as collateral by the Metropolitan Opera for a loan during the Great Recession in the United States in March 2009. Their assessed value was not stated. The paintings remained in the lobby of the opera house.
