= Le Grand Cirque (1968 painting) =

Painting by Marc Chagall

Le Grand Cirque (1968)
- The Big Circus (English)
- Artist: Marc Chagall
- Year: 1968
- Medium: Oil on canvas
- Dimensions: 160 cm × 170.2 cm (63 in × 67.0 in)
- Owner: private collection

Le Grand Cirque is an oil on canvas painting by Belarusian-French artist Marc Chagall, from 1968. It is held in a private collection.

== Description ==
On this painting, Chagall focuses on the ring or center stage as a mythical winged figures looks down upon the spectacle from on high. The subject of circus was dear to the artist. Chagall often returned to the circus as a subject matter in his artworks. He considered clowns, acrobats and actors as tragically human beings who are like characters in certain religious paintings. Among other Post-Impressionist and Modern painters who featured the circus in their works are Seurat, Toulouse-Lautrec, Picasso, Rouault, Van Dongen and Léger. Le Grand Cirque (1968) is considered Chagall's most grand exploration of the circus as a subject for his paintings.

== Provenance ==
Pierre Matisse Gallery, New York acquired the painting from the artist shortly after he completed it. The painting was first exhibited in New York in December 1968, and then was kept in Pierre Matisse Gallery's collection for several years, exhibiting at some of the most important retrospectives of the artist's work, including the definitive exhibition at the Royal Academy of Arts in 1985. In May 1998, the painting was sold to private collection at Sotheby's, New York.

== Exhibitions ==
- New York, Pierre Matisse Gallery, Marc Chagall, Recent Paintings, 1966-1968, 1968, no. 23
- New York, Solomon R. Guggenheim Museum, 1975
- New York, Pierre Matisse Gallery, Marc Chagall, A Celebration, 1977, no. 11
- Sarasota, John and Mable Ringling Museum of Art, The Circus in Art, 1977
- Milwaukee Museum of Art; Columbus Museum of Art; Albany, New York State Museum; Washington, D.C., Corcoran Gallery of Art, Center Ring: The Artist. Two Centuries of Circus Art, 1981–82, no. 29
- London, Royal Academy of Arts: Philadelphia Museum of Art, Chagall, 1985, no. 110

== See also ==
- List of artworks by Marc Chagall
- 1968 in art
