= List of artworks by Marc Chagall =

This article lists artworks produced by Marc Chagall (6 July [O.S. 24 June] 1887 – 28 March 1985), a painter who is associated with the modern movements after impressionism. The listing follows marcchagallart.net and Harris, The Life and Works of Chagall, except where noted.

== 1906–1910, Belarus ==
| Image Title | Year | Location |
|---|---|---|
| Image online Old Woman with a Ball of Yarn | 1906 | Private collection |
| Image online Young Woman on a Sofa (Mariaska) | 1907 | Private collection |
| Image online Window. Vitebsk | 1908 | Private collection |
| Image online Small Drawing Room | 1908 | Private collection |
| Image online A House in Liozno | 1908 | Private collection |
| Image online Apothecary in Vitebsk | 1908 | Private collection |
| Image online View from a Window. Vitebsk | 1908 | Moscow, Tretyakov Gallery |
| Image online The Death | 1908 | |
| Image online Sabbath | 1909 | |
| Image online The Family or Maternity | 1909 | Private collection |
| Image online My Fiancée with Black Gloves | 1909 | Kunstmuseum Basel |
| Image online Russian Wedding | 1910 | Zurich, Foundation E.G. Bührle |
| Image online Self-Portrait with Brushes. (Autoportrait) | 1909 to 1910 | Düsseldorf, Kunstsammlung Nordrhein-Westfalen |
| Image online Holy Family | 1909 | |
| Image online Still Life with Lamp | 1910 | Lucerne, Switzerland, Galerie Rosengart |
| Image online Birth | 1910 | Kunsthaus Zürich |

== 1910–1914, France ==
| Image Title | Year | Location |
|---|---|---|
| Image online Woman with a Bouquet | 1910 | Private collection |
| Image online The Model | 1910 | Private collection |
| Image online Butcher | 1910 | Moscow, Tretyakov Gallery |
| Image online Homage to Apollinaire | 1910 | Eindhoven, Netherlands, Van Abbemuseum |
| Image online Jewish Wedding | 1910 | Private collection |
| Image online The Clock (The Time) | 1911 | Moscow, Tretyakov Gallery |
| Image online Holy cab over Vitebsk | 1911 | |
| Image online Study for the painting "Rain" | 1911 | Moscow, Tretyakov Gallery |
| Image online Mant at table | 1911 | Cologne, Museum Ludwig |
| Image online The Drunkard | 1911 to 1912 | Private collection |
| Image online The Holy Coachman | 1911 to 1912 | Private collection |
| Image online Mazin, the Poet | 1911 to 1912 | Private collection |
| Image online The Poet, or Half Past Three | 1911 to 1912 | Philadelphia Museum of Art |
| Image online To My Betrothed | 1911 | Philadelphia Museum of Art |
| Image online Interior II | 1911 | Private collection |
| I and the Village | 1911 | New York, Museum of Modern Art |
| The Father | 1911 | Paris, Musée d'Art et d'Histoire du Judaïsme |
| Image online Othello and Desdemona | 1911 | Private collection, stolen and recovered |
| Image online The Green Donkey (L'Ane vert) | 1911 | London, Tate Modern |
| Image online The Holy Coachman (Le saint voiturier) | 1911 to 1912 | Private collection |
| Image online Russia. Asses and Others. | 1911 to 1912 | Paris, Musée National d'Art Moderne |
| Image online The Violinist | 1911 to 1914 | Düsseldorf, Kunstsammlung Nordrhein-Westfalen |
| Image online Homage to Apollinaire | 1911 to 1912 | |
| Image online Sleep-Walker (Le somnambule) | 1911 to 1912 | Minsk, Belgazprombank |
| Image online Golgotha | 1912 | New York, Museum of Modern Art |
| Image online Birth | 1912 | Art Institute of Chicago |
| Image online Adam and Eve | 1912 | Saint Louis Art Museum |
| Image online The Pinch of Snuff | 1912 | Frankfurt, Städel |
| Image online The Cattle Dealer | 1912 | |
| Image online Adam and Eve (Temptation) | 1912 | Nice, Musée Marc Chagall |
| Image online The Fiddler | 1912 to 1913 | |
| Image online The Flying Carriage (La caléche volante) | 1913 | New York, Solomon R. Guggenheim Museum |
| Image online The Soldier drinks | 1913 | New York, Solomon R. Guggenheim Museum |
| Image online Paris through the window | 1913 | New York, Solomon R. Guggenheim Museum |
| Self-Portrait with Seven Fingers | 1913 | Amsterdam, Stedelijk Museum |
| Image online Maternity | 1913 | |

== 1914–1922, Russia ==
| Image Title | Year | Location |
|---|---|---|
| Image online Self-portrait | 1914 | Philadelphia Museum of Art |
| Image online The praying Jew | 1914 | Art Institute of Chicago |
| Image online Over Vitebsk | 1914 | Philadelphia Museum of Art |
| Image online Jew in Green | 1914 | Kunstmuseum Basel |
| Image online Feast Day | 1914 | Düsseldorf, Kunstsammlung Nordrhein-Westfalen |
| Image online Over Vitebsk | 1915 to 1920 | |
| Image online War | 1915 | |
| Image online Red Jew | 1915 | Saint Petersburg, Russian Museum |
| Image online Window at the Dacha | 1915 | Moscow, Tretyakov Gallery |
| Birthday (in French) | 1915 | New York, Museum of Modern Art |
| Image online The Poet Reclining | 1915 | London, Tate Modern |
| Image online Strawberries. Bella and Ida at the Table | 1915 | Private collection |
| Image online Bella in Black Gloves | 1915 | |
| Image online Pink Lovers | 1916 | |
| Image online The Feast of the Tabernacles | 1916 | Lucerne, Switzerland, Galerie Rosengart |
| Image online Lilies-of-the-Valley | 1916 | Moscow, Tretyakov Gallery |
| Image online Bella and Ida by the Window | 1916 | Private collection |
| Image online Window Garden | 1917 | |
| Image online The Blue House | 1917 | |
| Image online The Promenade | 1917 | Saint Petersburg, Russian Museum |
| Bella with White Collar | 1917 | Paris, Centre Pompidou |
| Cemetery Gates Image online Cemetery Gates | 1917 | Paris, Musée d'Art et d'Histoire du Judaïsme |
| Image online Peasant Life (The Stable; Night; Man with Whip) | 1917 | New York, Solomon R. Guggenheim Museum |
| Image online The Painter: To the Moon | 1917 | Private collection |
| Image online Grey Lovers | 1917 | Private collection |
| Image online Double Portrait with a Glass of Wine | 1918 | Paris, Centre Pompidou |
| Image online Synagogue | 1917 | Private collection |
| Image online Houses at Vitebsk | 1917 | Washington, National Gallery of Art |
| Image online The Walk | 1917 | Wien, Albertina |
| Image online Above the town | 1917 to 1918 | |
| Image online The Wedding | 1917 to 1918 | |
| Image online Interior with flowers | 1918 | |
| Image online Dacha | 1918 | Private collection |
| Image online Apparition | 1918 | |
| Image online Wedding | 1918 | Moscow, Tretyakov Gallery |
| Image online Summer House. Backyard | 1918 | |
| Image online Still Life with Vase of Flowers | 1918 | Private collection |
| Image online Composition with Circles and Goat | 1919 | Private collection |
| Image online Circus | 1919 | Moscow, Tretyakov Gallery |
| Image online Music | 1919 | Moscow, Tretyakov Gallery |
| Image online Introduction to the jewish theater | 1920 | Moscow, Tretyakov Gallery |
| Image online Theater | 1920 | Moscow, Tretyakov Gallery |
| Image online Dance | 1920 | Moscow, Tretyakov Gallery |
| Image online Literature | 1920 | Moscow, Tretyakov Gallery |

== 1923–1941, France ==
| Image Title | Year | Location |
|---|---|---|
| Image online Le Juif errant | 1923 to 1925 | |
| Image online Green Violinist | 1923 to 1924 | New York, Solomon R. Guggenheim Museum |
| Image online The Falling Angel | 1923 to 1947 | Private collection |
| Image online The arrival of Chichikov in the town NN | 1923 to 1927 | Moscow, Tretyakov Gallery |
| Image online The house painters | 1923 to 1927 | Moscow, Tretyakov Gallery |
| Image online Korobotchka | 1923 to 1927 | Moscow, Tretyakov Gallery |
| Image online Selifan | 1923 to 1927 | Moscow, Tretyakov Gallery |
| Image online Nozdriov | 1923 to 1927 | Moscow, Tretyakov Gallery |
| Image online Uncle Mitiai & Uncle Miniai | 1923 to 1927 | Moscow, Tretyakov Gallery |
| Image online Sobakevitch | 1923 to 1927 | Moscow, Tretyakov Gallery |
| Image online The over-flowing table | 1923 to 1927 | Moscow, Tretyakov Gallery |
| Image online Banquet at the Police Chief`s House | 1923 to 1927 | Moscow, Tretyakov Gallery |
| Image online Revelations de Nozdriov | 1923 to 1927 | Moscow, Tretyakov Gallery |
| Image online The night watchman by the street-lamp | 1923 to 1927 | Moscow, Tretyakov Gallery |
| Image online Ball at the governor`s house | 1923 to 1927 | Moscow, Tretyakov Gallery |
| Image online The Window | 1924 | Kunsthaus Zürich |
| Image online The Vision | 1924 to 1925 | London, Tate Modern |
| Image online The Wandering Jew | 1924 to 1925 | |
| Image online Peasant Life | 1925 | |
| Image online The Watering Trough | 1925 | Philadelphia Museum of Art |
| Image online Bella in Mourillon | 1925 | Private collection |
| Image online The Lion Grown Old | 1926 to 1927 | Private collection |
| Image online Les Trois Acrobates | 1926 | Private collection |
| Image online Church on Lake Chambon | 1926 | Private collection |
| Image online Couple sous la pluie | 1926 | Private collection |
| Image online Woman with Pigs | 1926 | |
| Image online Lovers and the Eiffel Tower | 1928 | Private collection |
| Image online La danse | 1928 | Private collection |
| Image online The Cat Transformed into a Woman | 1928 to 1931 | London, Tate Modern |
| Image online Fruits and Flowers | 1929 | Private collection |
| Image online The Rooster | 1930 to 1939 | |
| Image online Time – the river without banks | 1929 | Madrid, Thyssen-Bornemisza Museum |
| Image online Lovers in the Lilacs | 1929 | Private collection |
| Image online Dream Village | 1929 | San Antonio, TX, McNay Art Museum |
| Image online The Eiffel Tower | 1929 | Ottawa, National Gallery of Canada |
| Image online The Acrobat | 1930 | Paris, Centre Pompidou |
| Image online View at Peira-Cava | 1930 | Private collection |
| Image online Interior of the yemenite hagoral synagogue, Jerusalem | 1931 | |
| Image online Bride with Blue Face | 1932 | Private collection |
| Image online Wailing Wall | 1932 | |
| Image online Solitude | 1933 | Tel Aviv Museum |
| Image online To My Wife | 1933 to 1944 | |
| Image online Bouquet with Flying Lovers | 1934 to 1947 | London, Tate Modern |
| Image online The Revolution | 1937 | Private collection |
| Image online White Crucifixion | 1938 | Art Institute of Chicago |
| Image online Hour between Wolf and Dog (Between Darkness and Light) | 1938 | Private collection |
| Image online The Three Candles | 1939 | Private collection |
| Image online Midsummer Night's Dream | 1939 | |
| Image online Newlyweds on the Eiffel Tower | 1939 | |
| Image online The Red Rooster | 1940 | Cincinnati Art Museum |

== 1941–1948, USA ==
| Image Title | Year | Location |
|---|---|---|
| Image online The Painter Crucified | 1941 to 1942 | |
| Image online Scene design for the Finale of the Ballet "Aleko" (Petersburg fantasy) | 1942 | New York, Museum of Modern Art |
| Image online The Yellow Crucifixion | 1942 | Art Institute of Chicago |
| Image online The Juggler | 1943 | Private collection |
| Image online Listening to the Cock | 1944 | |
| Image online The Wedding | 1944 | Private collection |
| Image online The House with the Green Eye | 1944 | Private collection |
| Image online Cow with Parasol | 1944 | Private collection |
| Image online Coq rouge dans la nuit | 1944 | |
| Image online The Wedding Lights | 1945 | Private collection |
| Image online Apocalypse in Lilac, Capriccio | 1945 | London, Ben Uri Gallery & Museum |
| Image online Designs for The Firebird | 1945 | New York City Ballet |
| Image online Madonna with the Sleigh | 1947 | Amsterdam, Stedelijk Museum |
| Image online Flayed Ox | 1947 | Private collection |
| Image online Self-Portrait with a Clock. In front of Crucifixion | 1947 | Private collection |
| Image online The Blue Violinist | 1947 | Private Collection |
| Image online Nocturne | 1947 | Pushkin Museum, Moscow |

== 1948–1985, France ==
| Image Title | Year | Location |
|---|---|---|
| Image online Clock in the flaring sky | 1947 to 1950 | Private collection |
| Image online Lovers near Bridge | 1948 | Private collection |
| Image online Green Landscape | 1948 to 1950 | Minsk, Belgazprombank |
| Image online Still Life of Flowers | 1949 | |
| Image online Blue Landscape | 1949 | |
| Image online Clock with a Blue Wing | 1949 | |
| Image online The Poet | 1949 to 1950 | |
| Image in La Mariée; The Bride | 1950 | featured in the 1999 film Notting Hill |
| Image online Lovers in the Red Sky | 1950 | San Francisco Museum of Modern Art |
| Image online Moses Receiving the Tablets of the Law | 1950 to 1952 | Private collection |
| Image online The Blue Circus | 1950 | London, Tate Modern |
| Image online The Dance and The Circus | 1950 | London, Tate Modern |
| Image online Le Ciel embrase | 1952 to 1954 | Private collection |
| Image online Exodus | 1952 | Private collection |
| Image online La fiancee revant | 1952 | |
| Image online La nuit verte | 1952 | |
| Image online Night | 1953 | Private collection |
| Image online Red Roofs | 1953 to 1954 | Private collection |
| Image online Portrait of Vava | 1953 to 1956 | Private collection |
| Image online On Two Banks | 1953 | Private collection |
| Image online Le Quai de Bercy | 1953 | Private collection |
| Image online The Bastille | 1953 | |
| Image online Etude pour les boulevards ou Paris fantastique | 1953 to 1954 | |
| Image online Bridges over the Seine | 1954 | Hamburger Kunsthalle |
| Image online Le Champ de Mars | 1954 to 1955 | Essen, Museum Folkwang |
| Image online The Farmyard | 1954 | Private collection |
| Image online Jacob's Dream | 1954 to 1967 | |
| Image online Self-Portrait with a Palette | 1955 | Private collection |
| Image online The Crossing of the Red Sea | 1955 | Jewish Museum (Manhattan) |
| Image online Newlyweds and Violinist | 1956 | Private collection |
| Image online Abraham and Sara | 1956 | Private collection |
| Image online Moses with the tablets of the Law | 1956 | |
| Image online David with his harp | 1956 | |
| Image online Solomon | 1956 | |
| Image online Jeremiah | 1956 | |
| Image in Le Grand Cirque; Le Grand Cirque | 1956 | Private collection |
| Image online Meeting Ruth and Vooz. Illyustratsiya to the Bible | 1957 to 1959 | |
| Image online Clowns at Night | 1957 | Private collection |
| Image online The Concert | 1957 | Private collection |
| Image online The Lovers of Vence | 1957 | |
| Image online Abraham and Three Angels | 1958 to 1960 | Private collection |
| Image online Big Sun | 1958 | Private collection |
| Image online 19 stained-glass windows for Metz Cathedral | 1958 to 1968 | Metz Cathedral |
| Image online Artist at Easel | 1959 | Private collection |
| Image online Le Juif a la Torah | 1959 | Private collection |
| Image online Commedia dell'arte | 1959 | Städtische Bühnen Frankfurt, Foyer |
| Image online Self-portrait | 1959 to 1960 | |
| Image in Bouquet près de la fenêtre Bouquet by the Window | 1959 to 1960 | Private collection |
| Image online Song of Songs III | 1960 | |
| Image online The Tribe of Benjamin | 1960 | |
| Image online Paradise | 1960 | |
| Image online God and Eve | 1960 | |
| Image online Cain and Abel | 1960 | |
| Image online Sarah and the angels | 1960 | |
| Image online Ruth and Boaz meet | 1960 | |
| Image online 9 stained glass windows | 1960 | New York, Union Church of Pocantico Hills |
| Image online Fleurs et corbeille de fruits | 1960 | |
| Image online Adam and Eve Expelled from Paradise | 1961 | cropped portion featured in the 1991 film Star Trek VI |
| Image online Paradise | 1961 | |
| Image online Noah and the Rainbow | 1961 to 1966 | |
| Image online King David | 1962 to 1963 | |
| Image online Vitrage Window for Hebrew University Jerusalem | 1962 | Hebrew University of Jerusalem |
| Image online 12 stained glass windows for Abbell Synagogue | 1962 | Jerusalem, Hadassah Medical Center |
| Image online Ceiling for the Paris Opera | 1963 to 1964 | |
| Image online Roi David sur fond rose | 1963 | |
| Image online War | 1964 to 1966 | Kunsthaus Zürich |
| Image online Peace Window – stained-glass window | 1964 | Headquarters of the United Nations |
| Image online La nuit enchantee | 1964 | |
| Image online Souvenir d'hiver | 1965 | |
| Image online Clowns et Ecuyere | 1965 | |
| Image online Portrait of Vava | 1966 | Private collection |
| Image online Horsewoman on Red Horse | 1966 | Private collection |
| Image online Cows over Vitebsk | 1966 | Private collection |
| Image online Le bouquet devant la fenetre | 1966 | |
| Image online Wall art | 1966 | Jerusalem, Knesset |
| Image online Diptych murals The Sources of Music and The Triumph of Music | 1966 | New York, lobby of the Metropolitan Opera |
| Image online Lunaria | 1967 | Private collection |
| Image online The Blue Face | 1967 | Private collection |
| Image online The Message of Odysseus | 1967 to 1968 | |
| Image online Twelve windows decorated | 1967 to 1985 | All Saints' Church, Tudeley |
| Image online La musique | 1967 | |
| Image online Stage settings for The Magic Flute | 1967 | New York, Metropolitan Opera |
| Image online The Big Circus | 1968 | Private collection |
| Image online Easter | 1968 | Private collection |
| Image online The Magician | 1968 | Private collection |
| Image online The Sun of Poros | 1968 | Private collection |
| Image online Laid Table with View of Saint-Paul de Vance | 1968 | Private collection |
| Image online Fisherman's Family | 1968 | Private collection |
| Image online The Players | 1968 | Private collection |
| Image online King David's Tower | 1968 to 1971 | Private collection |
| Image online The Prophet Jeremiah | 1968 | |
| Image online Village in Blue | 1968 | |
| Image online La Baou de Saint-Jeannet | 1969 | Private collection |
| Image online Artist and His Wife | 1969 | Private collection |
| Image online Village | 1970 | Private collection |
| Image online Les amoureux | 1970 | |
| Image in Scene de Cirque; Circus Scene | 1970 | Private collection |
| Image online Les maries sous le baldaquin | 1970 to 1975 | |
| Image online La recontre | 1970 to 1975 | |
| Image online Le clown violoniste e lane rouge | 1971 | |
| Image online Jacob's Ladder | 1973 | Private collection |
| Image online Le Clown Multicolor | 1974 | Private collection |
| Image online Song of Songs | 1974 | Private collection |
| Image online Vitrages in Notre-Dame Cathedral | 1974 | Reims Cathedral |
| Image in Four Seasons (Chagall); Four Seasons | 1974 | Chase Tower (Chicago) |
| Image online Blue Village | 1975 | Private collection |
| Image online Holy Family | 1975 to 1976 | Private collection |
| Image online Tree of Jesse | 1975 | Private collection |
| Image online The Fall of Icarus | 1975 | Paris, Centre Pompidou |
| Image online Autour du couple | 1975 to 1978 | |
| Image online Don Quixote | 1975 | |
| Image online La Visite | 1975 to 1978 | Private collection |
| Image online Composition | 1976 | Private collection |
| Image online Window in Artist's Studio | 1976 | Private collection |
| Image online Sunrise | 1976 | Private collection |
| Image online La Paix ou L'Arbre de vie | 1976 | Sarrebourg, Chapelle des Cordeliers (in German), Window |
| Image online Child with a Dove | 1977 to 1978 | Private collection |
| Image online Artist over Vitebsk | 1977 to 1978 | Private collection |
| Image online Saint-Paul de Vance at Sunset | 1977 | Private collection |
| Image online The Myth of Orpheus | 1977 | Private collection |
| Image online Angel over Vitebsk | 1977 | Private collection |
| Image online Phaeton | 1977 | Private collection |
| Image online America Windows | 1977 | Art Institute of Chicago |
| Image online St. John | 1978 | |
| Image online St. Mark and St. Matthew | 1978 | |
| Image online Stained-glass window | 1978 | Chichester Cathedral |
| Image online L'ane bleu | 1978 | |
| Image online Girl in the Waves | 1978 | |
| Image online Etude pour le Paysan | 1978 | |
| Nine biblical-themed windows | 1978 to 1985 | St. Stephan Mainz |
| Image online The Grand Parade | 1979 to 1980 | Private collection |
| Image online Circus | 1979 to 1981 | |
| Image online Le cirque | 1979 to 1981 | |
| Image online Artist and His Bride | 1980 | Private collection |
| Image online Newlyweds with Paris in the Background | 1980 | Private collection |
| Image online Rencontre | 1980 | Private collection |
| Image in Le Clown au Cirque; Le Clown au Cirque | 1980 | Private collection |
| Image online Le clown volant | 1981 | Botero Museum, Bogotá |
| Image online Artist's Reminiscence | 1981 | Private collection |
| Image online Self-Portrait with Bouquet | 1981 | Private collection |
| Image online Lovers (Les Amoureux) | 1981 | Minsk, Belgazprombank |
| Image online Artist at a Festival | 1982 | Private collection |
| Image online Artist over Vitebsk | 1982 | Private collection |
| Image online Artist over Vitebsk | 1982 to 1983 | Private collection |
| Image online Flower Bouquet | 1982 | Private collection |
| Image online Peintre au double-profil sur fond rouge | 1982 | |
| Image online Couple on a Red Background | 1983 | Private collection |
| Image online Soleil dans le ciel de Saint-Paul | 1983 | Private collection |
| Image online Great Circus | 1984 | Private collection |

== See also ==
- Musée Marc Chagall

== Notes ==
=== References ===
- Harris, Nathaniel (1994). The Life and Works of Chagall. Bristol, England: Parragon. ISBN 9781858136264 – via Internet Archive.
