= Bella Rosenfeld =

Russian Jewish writer (1889–1944)

Bella Rosenfeld Chagall
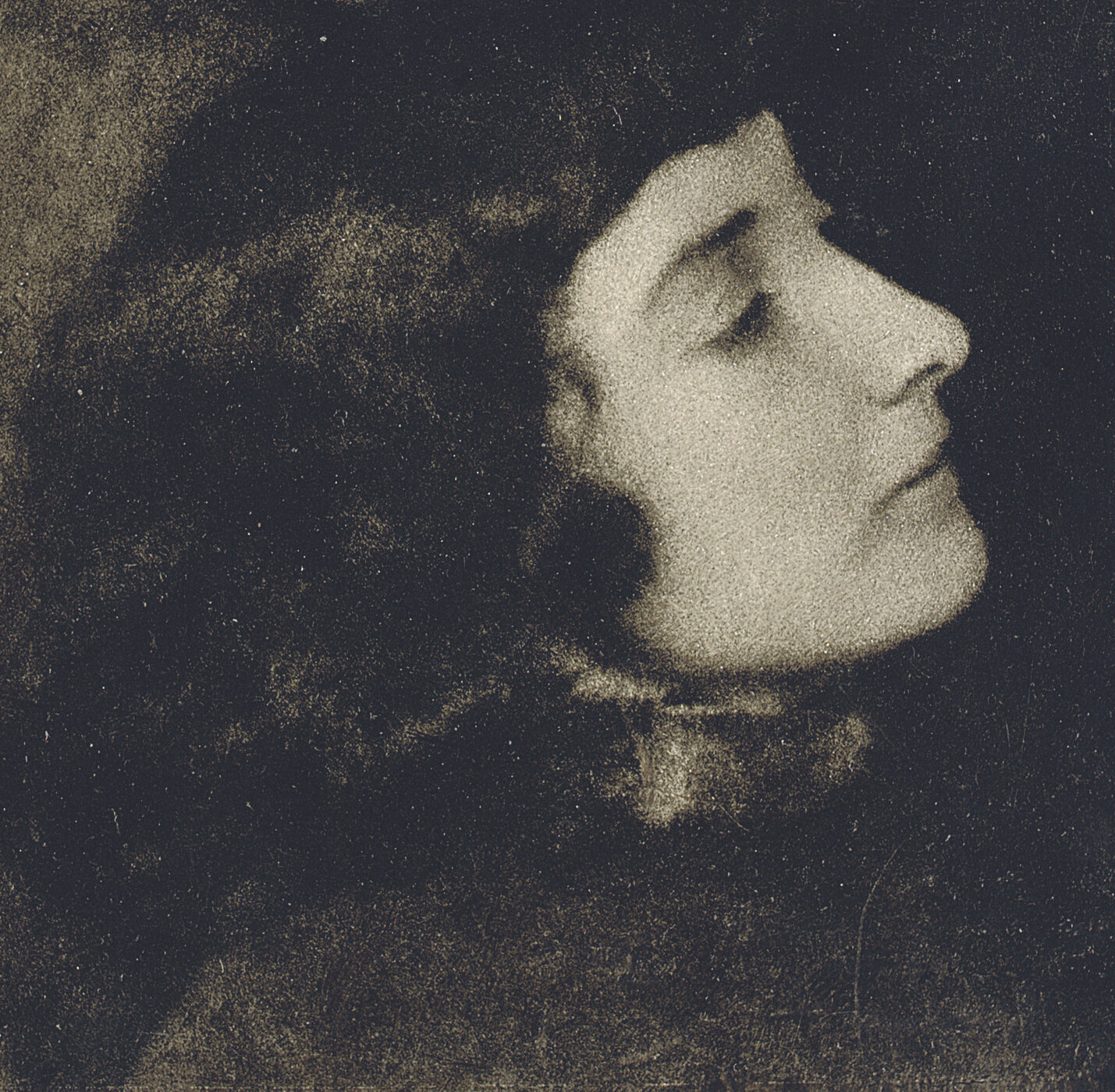
- Chagall in 1923
- Born: Basia-Reiza Rosenfeld; 4 December 1889; Vitebsk, Russian Empire
- Died: 2 September 1944 (aged 54); New York City, U.S.
- Known for: Author
- Spouses: Marc Chagall
- Children: 1

Bella Rosenfeld Chagall (Russian: Бэлла Розенфельд-Шагал, romanized: Bella Rozenfeld-Shagal; Yiddish: בעלאַ ראָזענפעלד; 14 December 1889 – 2 September 1944) was a Russian Jewish writer and the first wife of painter Marc Chagall. She was the subject of many of Chagall's paintings including Bella au col blanc (Bella with White Collar) in 1917, and appears posthumously in Bouquet près de la fenêtre, painted in 1959–1960.

== Biography ==
Basia-Reiza "Bella" Rosenfeld was born on 14 December 1889, in Vitebsk (present-day Belarus), into a wealthy Jewish family of jewellers.

She met Marc Chagall in 1909 who at that time was a penniless apprentice of Léon Bakst. According to Marc, their love started the moment they saw each other and continued for 35 years. Chagall painted his first portrait of her that same year: My Fiancée with Black Gloves (Kunstmuseum Basel). They married in 1915 and moved to Petrograd. The following year she gave birth to their daughter, Ida. In 1918 they returned to Vitebsk and four years later, in 1922, they emigrated to Lithuania and then on to Germany. By 1924 they were living in Paris. In 1939, they moved to the south of France where they were arrested in 1941. They fled to the United States where Rosenfeld died of a bacterial infection on 2 September 1944.

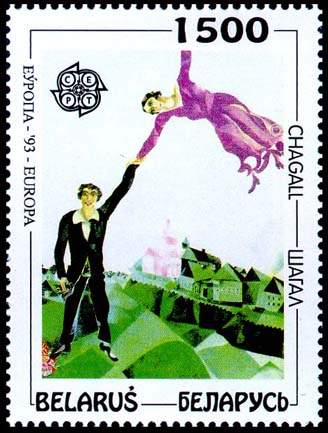
Rosenfeld and Chagall on a Belarus stamp, 1993

Posthumously, her most famous book, The Burning Lights, was published in 1946. In 1993 she appeared, together with Chagall, on a Belarus stamp. A play Birthday about the Chagalls' relationship, was written by Emma Rice, Nikki Sved and Daniel Jamieson in the 1990s. It was rewritten and became The Flying Lovers of Vitebsk.

== Works ==
- Chagall, Bella (1945). Brenendike likht. New York, USA: Book League of the Jewish People's Fraternal Order.
- Chagall, Bella; Guterman, Norbert (1946). Burning Lights. New York, USA: Schocken Books Inc.
- Chagall, Bella (1947). Di ershte bagegenish, with drawings by Marc Chagall. New York, USA: Book League of the Jewish People's Fraternal Order.
- Chagall, Bella (1983). The first encounter. New York, USA: Schocken Books Inc. ISBN 0-8052-3768-2. with afterword by Marc Chagall

== In Chagall's art ==
Bella with White Collar, by Marc Chagall, 1917.

Rosenfeld was referenced to, or appeared in the following paintings by Chagall:

- My fiancé with black gloves (1909)
- To my betrothed (1911)
- The birthday (1915)
- Bella and Ida by the window (1916)
- The walk (1917)
- Bella au col blanc (Bella with White Collar) (1917)
- Over the town (1917–1918)
- The wedding (1917–1918)
- Double portrait with a wine glass (1917–1918)
- Bella in Mourillon (1925)
- To my wife (1933/1944)
- Bella in green (1934)
- Bouquet with flying lovers (1934/1947)
- Bouquet près de la fenêtre (1959–1960)

== Sources ==
- Shishanov, V. «These young people were socialists … ». Participants of revolutionary movement in Marc Chagall and Belly Rozenfeld's environment // Bulletin of the Museum of Marc Chagall. 2005. No.13. pp. 64–74.
- Shishanov, V. «Wishing to arrive...» (Documents on study Belly Rozenfeld on the Moscow higher female courses) // The Chagalovsky sbornik. Release. 3. Materials X – XIV Chagalovsky readings in Vitebsk (2000–2004). Minsk: «Riftur», 2008. pp. 176–182.
