= 66th Street–Lincoln Center station =

New York City Subway station in Manhattan

66 Street–Lincoln Center
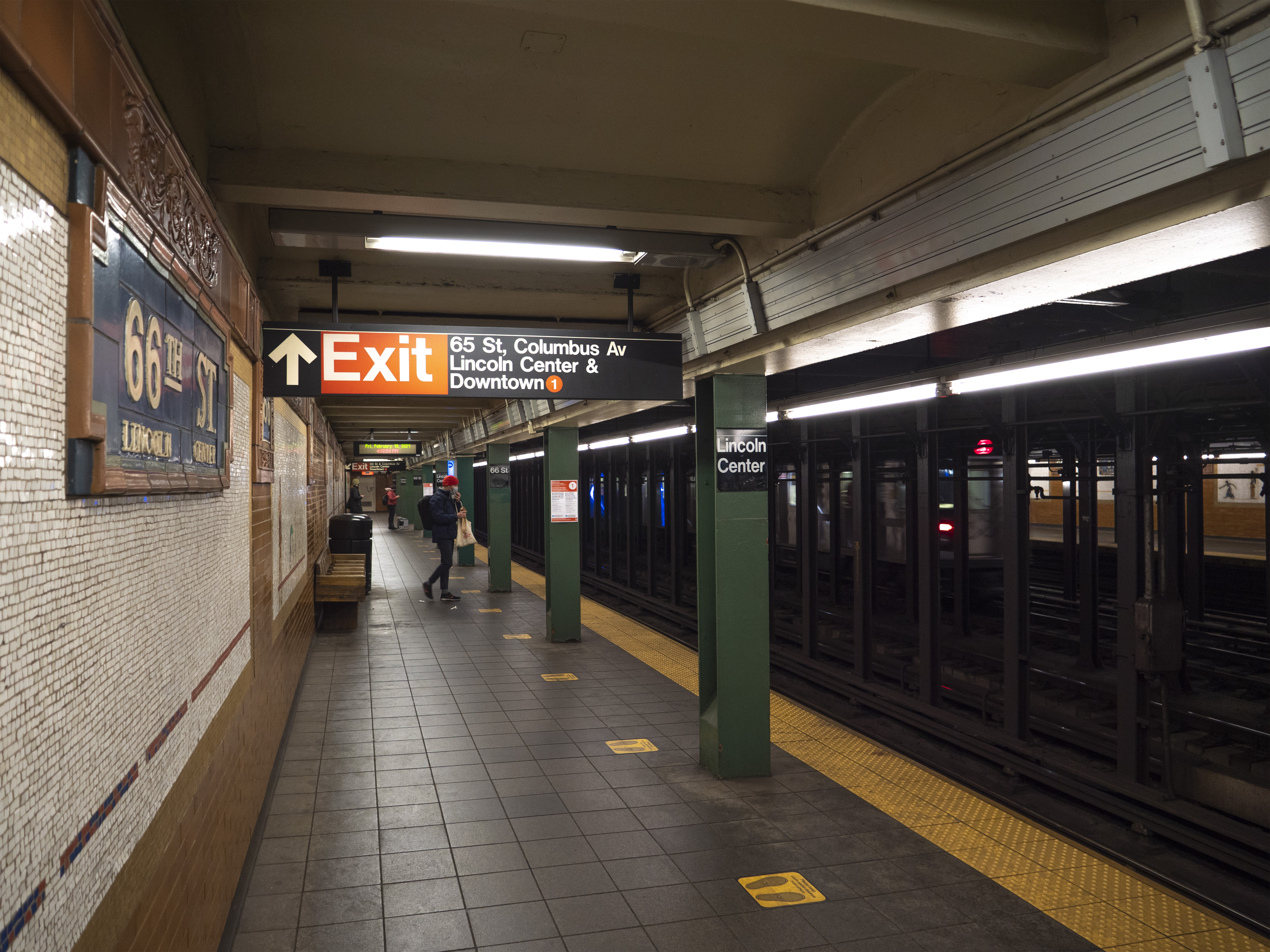
- Northbound platform with an R142 2 train skipping the station

Station statistics
- Address: West 66th Street and Broadway; New York, New York
- Borough: Manhattan
- Locale: Lincoln Square, Upper West Side
- Coordinates: 40.774°N 73.982°W
- Division: A (IRT)
- Line: IRT Broadway–Seventh Avenue Line
- Services: 1 (all times); 2 (late nights)
- Transit: NYCT Bus: M5, M7, M11, M66, M104; MTA Bus: BxM2
- Structure: Underground
- Platforms: 2 side platforms
- Tracks: 4

Other information
- Opened: October 27, 1904; 122 years ago
- Accessible: Yes

Traffic
- 2025: 5,088,311 ▲6.6%
- Rank: 60 out of 423
Services
Preceding station	New York City Subway	Following station
72nd Street 1 2 toward Van Cortlandt Park–242nd Street	Local	59th Street–Columbus Circle 1 2 toward South Ferry
does not stop here
Location
Location within New York City Subway
Location within New York City
Location within New York
Track layout
Street map
Station service legend
Symbol	Description
Stops all times	Stops all times
Stops late nights only	Stops late nights only

The 66th Street–Lincoln Center station is a local station on the IRT Broadway–Seventh Avenue Line of the New York City Subway. Located at the intersection of 66th Street and Broadway in the Lincoln Square neighborhood of Manhattan, it is served by the 1 train at all times and by the 2 train during late nights.

The 66th Street station was constructed for the Interborough Rapid Transit Company (IRT) as part of the city's first subway line, which was approved in 1900. Construction of the line segment that includes the 66th Street station began on August 22 of the same year. The station opened on October 27, 1904, as one of the original 28 stations of the New York City Subway. The station's platforms have been lengthened since opening.

The 66th Street station contains two side platforms and four tracks; express trains use the inner two tracks to bypass the station. The station was built with tile and mosaic decorations. The platforms contain exits to 66th Street and Broadway as well as to Lincoln Center, and to schools in the Center such as The Juilliard School and Fordham Lincoln Center. The station contains elevators from the street, which make it compliant with the Americans with Disabilities Act of 1990.

== History ==
=== Construction and opening ===
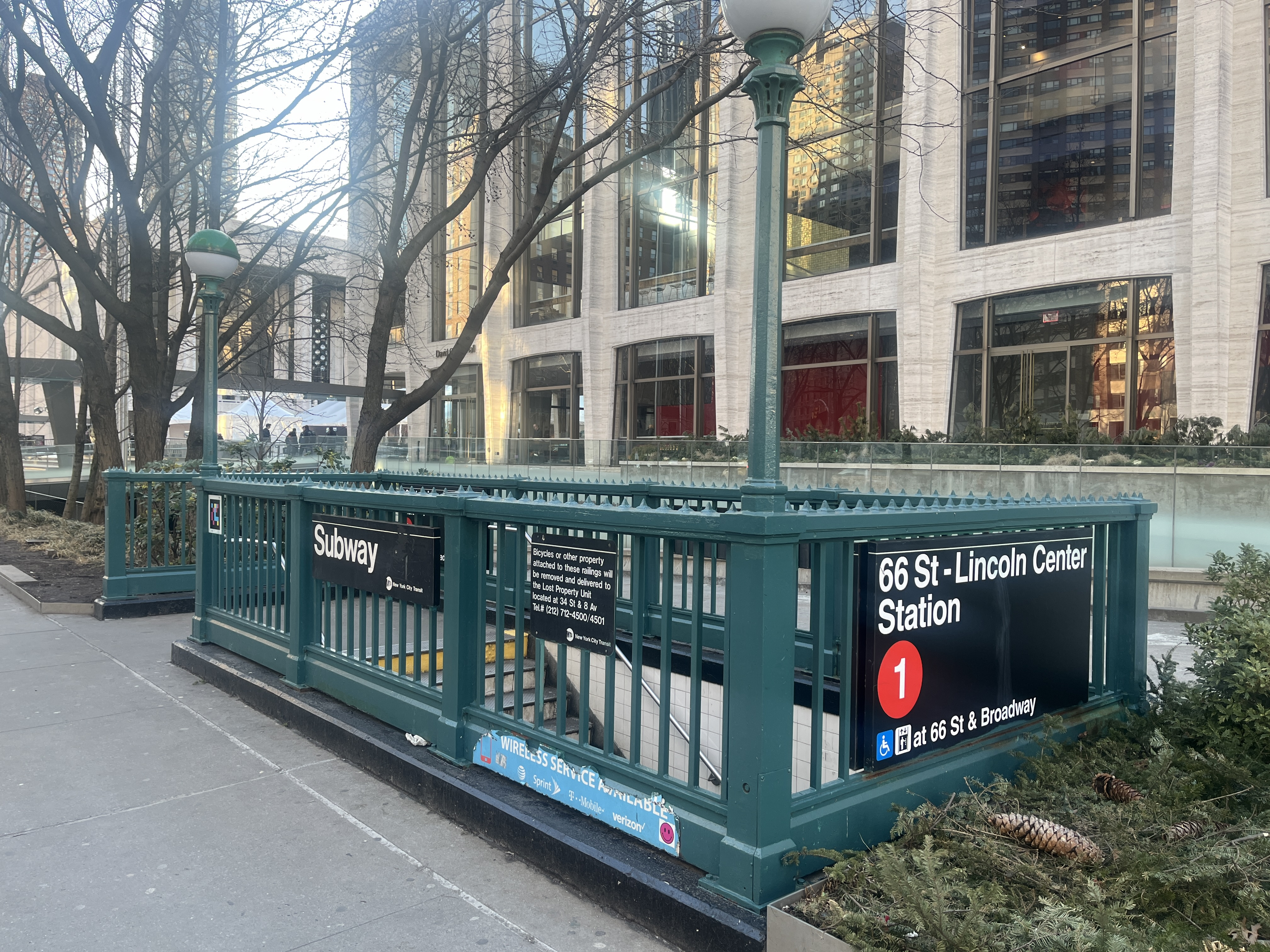
Southbound street stair at 65th Street

Planning for a subway line in New York City dates to 1864, but development of what became the city's first subway line did not start until 1894, when the New York State Legislature passed the Rapid Transit Act. The subway plans were drawn up by a team of engineers led by William Barclay Parsons, the Rapid Transit Commission's chief engineer. It called for a subway line from New York City Hall in lower Manhattan to the Upper West Side, where two branches would lead north into the Bronx. A plan was formally adopted in 1897, and all legal conflicts over the route alignment were resolved near the end of 1899.

The Rapid Transit Construction Company, organized by John B. McDonald and funded by August Belmont Jr., signed the initial Contract 1 with the Rapid Transit Commission in February 1900, under which it would construct the subway and maintain a 50-year operating lease from the opening of the line. In 1901, the firm of Heins & LaFarge was hired to design the underground stations. Belmont incorporated the Interborough Rapid Transit Company (IRT) in April 1902 to operate the subway.

The 66th Street station was constructed as part of the IRT's West Side Line (now the Broadway–Seventh Avenue Line) from 60th Street to 82nd Street, for which work had begun on August 22, 1900. Work for that section had been awarded to William Bradley. By late 1903, the subway was nearly complete, but the IRT Powerhouse and the system's electrical substations were still under construction, delaying the system's opening. The 66th Street station opened on October 27, 1904, as one of the original 28 stations of the New York City Subway from City Hall to 145th Street on the West Side Branch.

=== Service changes and station renovations ===
==== 1910s to 1930s ====
After the first subway line was completed in 1908, the station was served by local trains along both the West Side (now the Broadway–Seventh Avenue Line to Van Cortlandt Park–242nd Street) and East Side (now the Lenox Avenue Line). West Side local trains had their southern terminus at City Hall during rush hours and South Ferry at other times, and had their northern terminus at 242nd Street. East Side local trains ran from City Hall to Lenox Avenue (145th Street).

To address overcrowding, in 1909, the New York Public Service Commission proposed lengthening the platforms at stations along the original IRT subway. As part of a modification to the IRT's construction contracts made on January 18, 1910, the company was to lengthen station platforms to accommodate ten-car express and six-car local trains. In addition to $1.5 million (equivalent to $51.8 million in 2025) spent on platform lengthening, $500,000 (equivalent to $17.3 million in 2025) was spent on building additional entrances and exits. It was anticipated that these improvements would increase capacity by 25 percent. Platforms at local stations, such as the 66th Street station, were lengthened by between 20 and 30 feet (6.1 and 9.1 m). Both platforms were extended to the north and south. Six-car local trains began operating in October 1910. The Broadway–Seventh Avenue Line opened south of Times Square–42nd Street in 1918, and the original line was divided into an H-shaped system. The original subway north of Times Square thus became part of the Broadway–Seventh Avenue Line, and all local trains were sent to South Ferry.

In December 1922, the Transit Commission approved a $3 million project to lengthen platforms at 14 local stations along the original IRT line, including 66th Street and five other stations on the Broadway–Seventh Avenue Line. Platform lengths at these stations would be increased from 225 to 436 feet (69 to 133 m). The commission postponed the platform-lengthening project in September 1923, at which point the cost had risen to $5.6 million.

==== 1940s to 1970s ====
The city government took over the IRT's operations on June 12, 1940. The IRT routes were given numbered designations in 1948 with the introduction of "R-type" rolling stock, which contained rollsigns with numbered designations for each service. The Broadway route to 242nd Street became known as the 1 and the Lenox Avenue route as the 3.

The original IRT stations north of Times Square could barely fit local trains of five or six cars depending on the configuration of the trains. Stations on the line from 50th Street to 96th Street, including this station but excluding the 91st Street station, had their platforms extended in the 1950s to accommodate ten-car trains as part of a $100 million rebuilding program (equivalent to $1,146.3 million in 2025). The joint venture of Rosoff Bros Inc. and Joseph Meltzer Associates Inc. received a contract to remodel the 50th Street, 59th Street, and 66th Street stations. in February 1957. The platform extensions at the local stations were completed by early 1958. Once the project was completed, all 1 trains became local and all 2 and 3 trains became express, and eight-car local trains began operation. Increased and lengthened service was implemented during peak hours on the 1 train on February 6, 1959. Due to the lengthening of the platforms at 86th Street and 96th Street, the intermediate 91st Street station was closed on February 2, 1959, because it was too close to the other two stations.

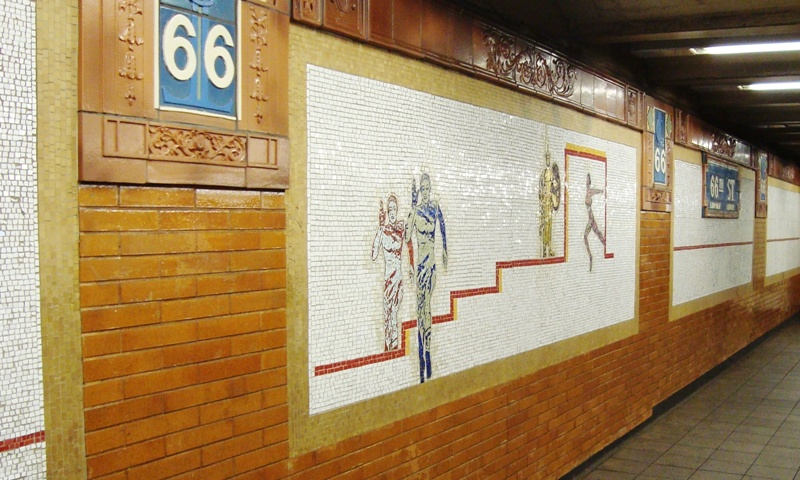
Artwork on the northbound platform

On November 29, 1962, a new entrance at the station opened, leading to the lobby of the Philharmonic (now David Geffen) Hall of Lincoln Center. The entrance led from the downtown platform of the station and also provided access to the uptown platform by an underpass at the station's south end. This entrance was built as part of a $10.2 million underground complex by the New York City Parks Department for the Philharmonic Hall. The project was partially funded by a Federal grant, and the work was contracted out to Slattery Construction Company.

==== 1980s to present ====
In 1981, the MTA announced the creation of its Culture Stations program to install public art in the subway. The Culture Stations program was started to deter graffiti, and was inspired by legislation in the New York City Council that mandated that 1% of the cost of constructing public buildings be used for art. The program was modeled on the Louvre – Rivoli station on the Paris Métro, which featured reproductions of the artwork on display in the Louvre. Four stations, namely 66th Street, Astor Place, Eastern Parkway–Brooklyn Museum, and Fifth Avenue/53rd Street, were selected for the program due to their proximity to cultural institutions. These would be among the first stations in the MTA's new station refurbishment program, which began in 1982. Initially, there was funding only for the Astor Place and Fifth Avenue/53rd Street stations. The MTA announced in 1983 that it would allocate funding to renovate the 66th Street station as part of its capital program.

The renovation was supposed to have been partially funded by developer Daniel Brodsky, who had contributed $1.06 million toward the project in exchange for more floor space at 45 West 67th Street, an apartment building that Brodsky was constructing nearby. Several developers would have contributed additional funds for the project. However, the funds remained unused for several years. The Eastern Parkway and 66th Street stations had still not been renovated by 1986, even though the Astor Place and Fifth Avenue/53rd Street projects had been completed by then. According to New York City Planning Commission chairwoman Sylvia Deutsch, the MTA had chosen to delay the 66th Street project.

In April 1988, the New York City Transit Authority (NYCTA) unveiled plans to speed up service on the Broadway–Seventh Avenue Line through the implementation of a skip-stop service: the 9 train. When skip-stop service started in 1989, it was only implemented north of 137th Street–City College on weekdays, and 66th Street was served by both the 1 and the 9. Skip-stop service ended on May 27, 2005, as a result of a decrease in the number of riders who benefited.

In 1996, the MTA announced that it would renovate the 66th Street station over the next three years starting that September. The station was rebuilt to designs by Lee Harris Pomeroy. As part of the $16 million project, the station would get new floor and wall tiles, new lighting, a new staircase, and would have two elevators installed to make the station compliant with the Americans with Disabilities Act of 1990. In addition, communication and power systems were upgraded, and control areas were redesigned. The station's original terra cotta mosaics were restored as part of the project, and new "LC" mosaics were installed in a similar design to the originals. As part of the Arts for Transit program, mosaics by Nancy Spero were installed on the platforms. At the time of the renovation, the station had seen a 12 percent increase in ridership over the past few years because of the presence of new apartment buildings and popular businesses nearby.

The 66th Street station received esthetic improvements in early 2024 as part of the MTA's Re-New-Vation program. The elevators were then replaced, reopening in June 2025.

== Station layout ==
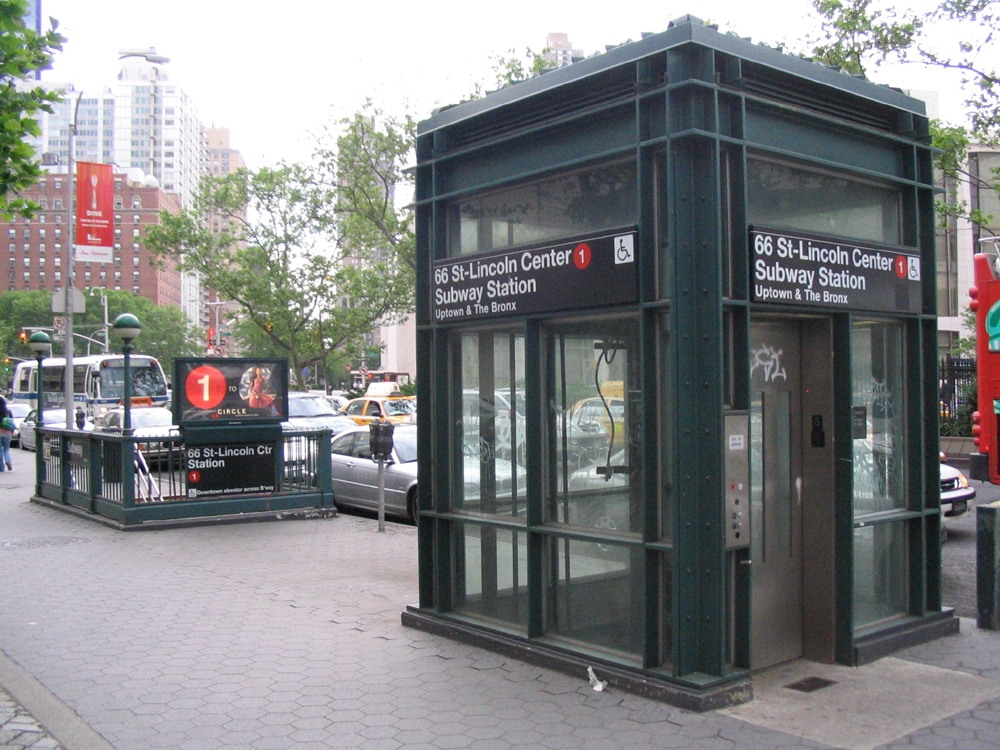
Street entrance and elevator

Like other local stations, 66th Street has four tracks and two side platforms. The station is served by the 1 at all times and by the 2 during late nights; the center express tracks are used by the 2 train during daytime hours and the 3 train at all times. The station is between 72nd Street to the north and 59th Street–Columbus Circle to the south. The platforms were originally 200 feet (61 m) long, like at other local stations on the original IRT, but as a result of the 1958–1959 platform extension, became 520 feet (160 m) long. The 66th Street station is fully wheelchair-accessible, with elevators connecting the street and platforms. There is also a crossunder between the uptown and downtown side platforms at the extreme south end of the station, which is not wheelchair-accessible.

=== Design ===
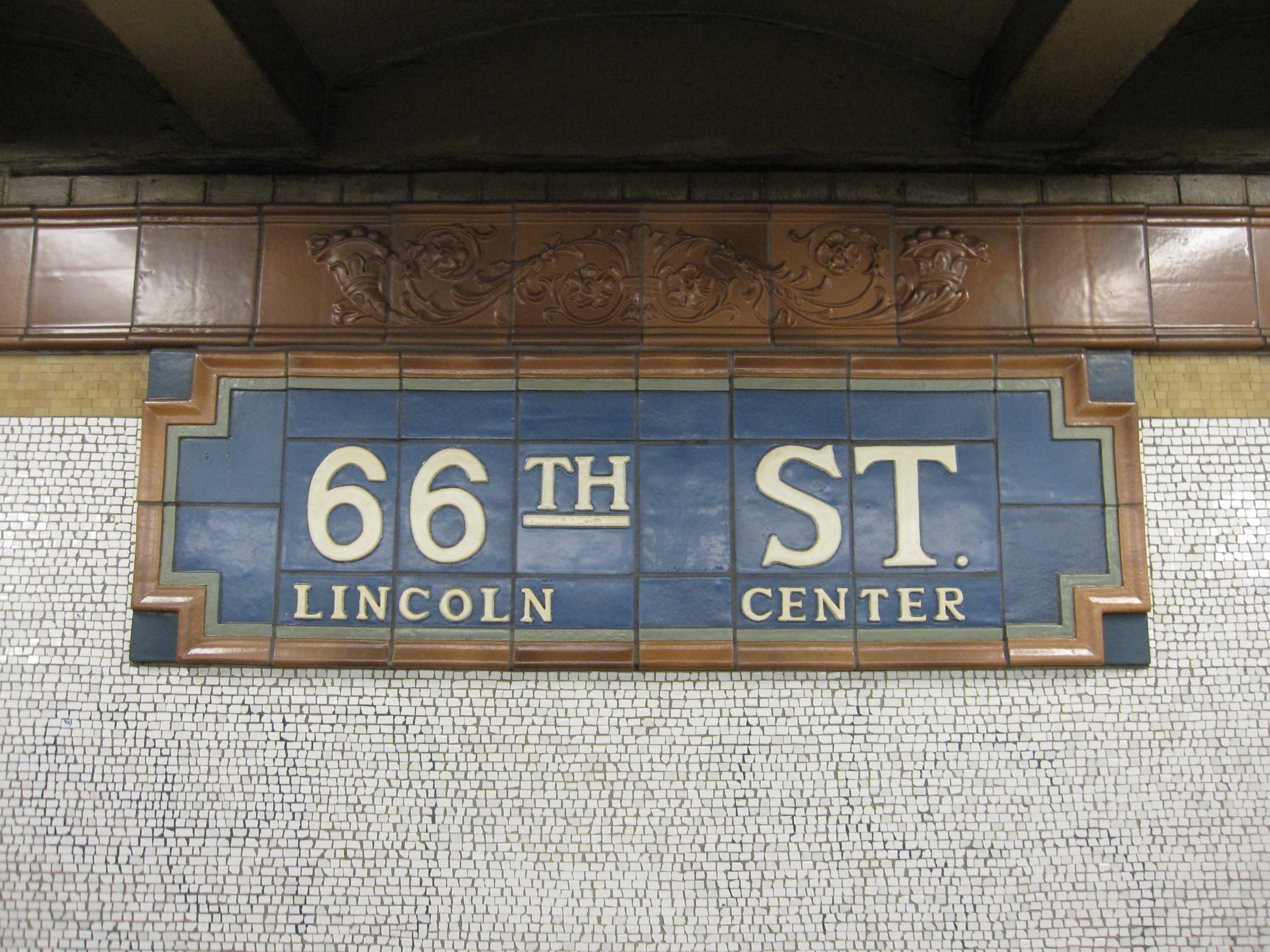
Name tablet

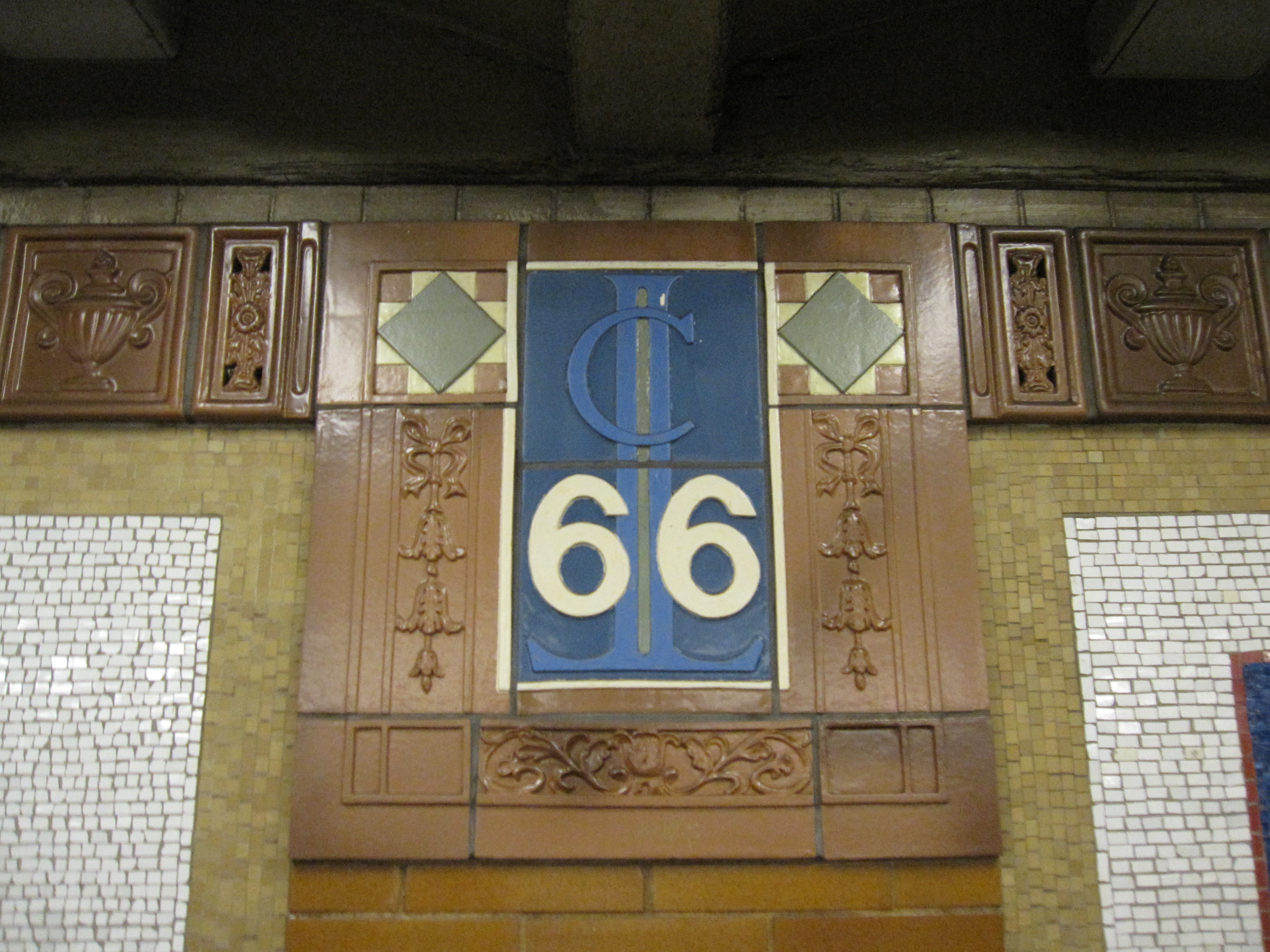
Cartouche

As with other stations built as part of the original IRT, the station was constructed using a cut-and-cover method. The tunnel is covered by a U-shaped trough that contains utility pipes and wires. This trough contains a foundation of concrete no less than 4 inches (100 mm) thick. Each platform consists of 3-inch-thick (7.6 cm) concrete slabs, beneath which are drainage basins. The original platforms contain circular, cast-iron Doric-style columns spaced every 15 feet (4.6 m), while the platform extensions contain I-beam columns. Additional columns between the tracks, spaced every 5 feet (1.5 m), support the jack-arched concrete station roofs. There is a 1-inch (25 mm) gap between the trough wall and the platform walls, which are made of 4-inch (100 mm)-thick brick covered over by a tiled finish.

The decorative scheme consists of yellow faience station-name tablets, buff tile bands, a yellow faience cornice, and blue faience plaques. The mosaic tiles at all original IRT stations were manufactured by the American Encaustic Tile Company, which subcontracted the installations at each station. The original decorative work was performed by tile contractor Manhattan Glass Tile Company and faience contractor Grueby Faience Company. As part of the station's 1990s renovation, plaques with the initials "L" and "C", with the number "66" overlaid on them, were installed; they are designed in a style similar to the original mosaics. The ceilings of the original platforms and fare control areas contain plaster molding.

The walls at the platform level contain a mosaic artwork called Artemis, Acrobats, Divas and Dancers, which was designed by local artist Nancy Spero as part of the MTA Arts & Design program. The artwork, installed in 2001, consists of 22 panels that depict a diva in various settings, a reference to the station's location next to Lincoln Center.

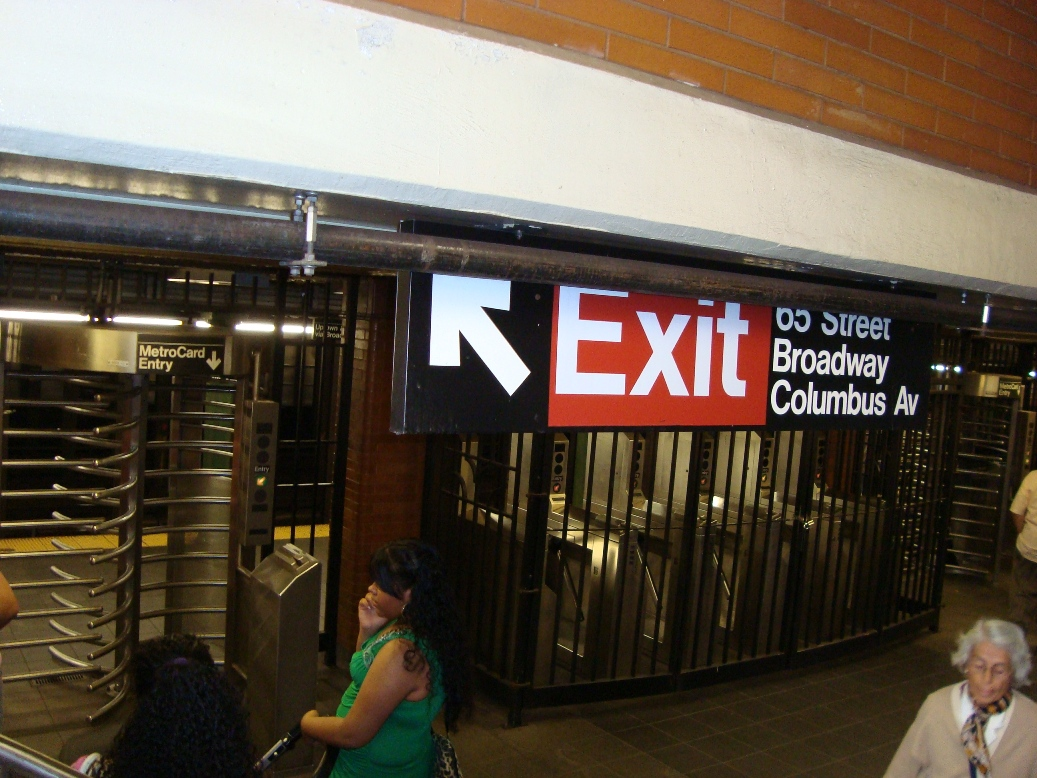
Turnstiles to platform

=== Exits ===
There are two staircases and one elevator on the southeastern corner of Broadway and 66th Street, leading to the northbound platform. Two staircases and one elevator on the southwestern corner of the same intersection lead to the southbound platform. Both sets of entrances and exits lead directly to their respective platform levels. A third set of exits, at the extreme south end of the southbound platform, contains a stair to the southwestern corner of Columbus Avenue and 65th Street, as well as a passageway to David Geffen Hall. This section of the station contains the crossunder.

== Nearby points of interest ==
Buildings of Lincoln Center
Buildings and structures in Lincoln Center:
1 Samuel B. and David Rose Building (includes Walter Reade Theater)
2 Juilliard School
3 Alice Tully Hall
4 Vivian Beaumont Theater (includes Mitzi E. Newhouse Theater and Claire Tow Theater)
5 Elinor Bunin Monroe Film Center
6 David Geffen Hall
7 New York Public Library for the Performing Arts (includes Bruno Walter Auditorium)
8 Metropolitan Opera House
9 Josie Robertson Plaza with Revson Fountain
10 Damrosch Park
11 David H. Koch Theater
12 David Rubenstein Atrium
13 Jazz at Lincoln Center

The station provides access to Lincoln Center for the Performing Arts just to the south, with Alice Tully Hall just to the west. All of the Lincoln Center venues are connected by underground concourses near the southern end of the station. Dante Park, upstairs at the south end, is named for the poet Dante Alighieri, whose statue is found there. Richard Tucker Park is nearby, at the north end of Lincoln Square.

A number of schools are nearby as well, including the Fiorello H. LaGuardia High School of Music & Art and Performing Arts and some small schools located in the former Martin Luther King Jr. High School building.

This station also provides access to:

- ABC Television Center East studios, and its affiliate WABC-TV
- American Folk Art Museum
- Amsterdam Houses, New York City Housing Authority
- Leonard Bernstein Way (W. 65th Street between Amsterdam Avenue and Broadway)
- Central Park
- Church of St. Paul the Apostle
- Church of the Good Shepherd
- Ethical Culture Fieldston School, Lower School
- Fordham University Lincoln Center campus
- Holy Trinity Lutheran Church
- Peter Jennings Way (W. 66th Street between Columbus Avenue and Central Park West)
- Juilliard School
- Lincoln Center for the Performing Arts
- Lincoln Square farmers market (at Richard Tucker Square)
- Lincoln Square Synagogue
- Manhattan New York Temple (Mormon)
- Merkin Concert Hall
- New York Institute of Technology
- New York Society for Ethical Culture
- West Side YMCA
