= Damrosch (disambiguation) =

Damrosch is a surname.

Damrosch may also refer to:

- Damrosch (horse), American racehorse
- Damrosch Opera Company (1894–1900), American opera company founded by Walter Damrosch
- Damrosch Park at Lincoln Center, New York City, named after the Damrosch family
