= Martin E. Segal =

- Born: Martin Eli Segal; July 4, 1916; Vitebsk, Russian Empire
- Died: August 5, 2012 (aged 96); Manhattan, New York City
- Occupations: Founder and chairman Emeritus of The Segal Company (1939–2012); Founding president and CEO of Film Society of Lincoln Center (1968–1978); Chairman of Lincoln Center (1981–1986)
- Spouse: Edith (m. 1937–2011) (deceased)

Martin Eli Segal (July 4, 1916 – August 5, 2012) was a Russian-born American businessman who co-founded the Film Society of Lincoln Center in 1969 with two other Lincoln Center executives, William F. May and Schuyler G. Chapin. He also served as the Film Society's founding president and CEO until 1978. Segal was founding chair of the Commission for Cultural Affairs, the Cultural Assistance Center, and the New York International Festival of the Arts.

Segal was born in Vitebsk, Russian Empire (now located in present-day Belarus), in 1916 and immigrated to the United States. He is a former Associated Press columnist and founder of human resource and benefits consulting firm, The Segal Group, which he founded in October 1939. Segal served as the General Chairman of the Night of 100 Stars II on February 17, 1985, the first AIDS benefit held by the Actors' Fund of America.

The Martin E. Segal Theatre Center (MESTC), located at the CUNY Graduate Center in New York City, was renamed for Segal in March 1999. It was founded as the Center for Advanced Studies in Theatre Arts (CASTA) in 1979. He died at his Manhattan home in 2012. He was 96.

The Martin E. Segal Awards were established by Lincoln Center’s Board when Mr. Segal retired as Chairman in 1986. Marking the commitment of the late Mr. Segal to support rising artists, Lincoln Center’s 11 resident organizations nominate an artist annually for the distinguished prize, which gives financial assistance and recognition to young artists of exceptional accomplishment.

== Recipients ==
Martin E. Segal Award recipients include:

Melissa Aldana Tyler Angle Paul Appleby Jeff Balsmeyer Inon Barnatan Joan Barnhill Alessio Bax Alan Berliner Sheldon Best Jonathan Biss Borromeo String Quartet Brentano Quartet Jason Robert Brown Julia Bullock Cast of Serafina Anna Christy Eric Cutler The Daedalus String Quartet Michelle DeYoung Aaron Diehl Meaghan Dutton-O’Hara Nelsan Ellis Escher String Quartet Silas Farley Ying Fang Daire Fitzgerald Shalita Grant David Gresham Andrea Gruber Augustin Hadelich Stefon Harris Helen Huang Michelle Hurst JACK Quartet Thomas Kail Richard Kelley Quinn Kelsey Alec Knight Claire Kretzschmar Michael John LaChiusa Kate Lindsey Jon Magnussen Miriam Mahdaviani Nancy Maultsby Reveka E. Mavrovitis Jim McKay Roberto Minczuk Karen Notare Matías Piñeiro Laura Poitras Jason Ritter Valerian Ruminski Mauricio Salgado Jennie Somogyi Scott St. John Abi Stafford Jonathan Stafford Michael Stuhlbarg Anita Thacher Camille Thurman Daniel Ulbricht Erica vonKleist Kenny Washington Alisa Weilerstein George Wellington Christopher Wheeldon Shai Wosner Xian Zhang
