= William F. May (chemical engineer) =

American chemical engineer and businessman (1915–2011)

William Frederick May (October 25, 1915 – September 18, 2011) was an American chemical engineer, businessman and co-founder of the Film Society of Lincoln Center.

== Early life and education ==
May was born in Chicago in 1915 and raised in the suburb of Oak Park. He graduated from Oak Park High School and earned a bachelor's degree in chemical engineering from the University of Rochester in 1937. He pursued graduate studies at both the University of Chicago and the Illinois Institute of Technology.

== Career ==
In the 1930s, May joined DuPont as part of a research team which developed the first rust-proof paint. He was hired by the American Can Company in 1940, based in a laboratory in Maywood, Illinois. May became head of the American Can Company and shepherded the company through fifteen years of expansion and growth from 1965. He spearheaded American Can Company's relocation of its corporate headquarters to Greenwich, Connecticut, in 1972.

May was elected to the Lincoln Center for the Performing Arts' board of directors in 1967. He was tasked with establishing a new film department for Lincoln Center. He worked as the program's chief fundraiser, while two other members of the committee handled artistic contributions, Richard Roud and Amos Vogel, both of whom founded the New York Film Festival. However, Lincoln Center withdrew financial support from the committee in 1968 due to financial woes. May searched for new financial donors. In 1969, May and two Lincoln Center executives, Schuyler G. Chapin and Martin E. Segal, co-founded the Film Society of Lincoln Center.

== Retirement ==
May retired from the American Can Company in 1980. He served as the dean of what is now called the New York University Stern School of Business for four years. He later became the chief executive of the Statue of Liberty-Ellis Island Foundation, eventually becoming chairman emeritus in 2006.

William May died on September 18, 2011, in Greenwich, Connecticut, where he resided since 1970, at the age of 95. Before moving to Greenwich, he and his family had lived in nearby Chappaqua, New York. He was survived by his wife, Kathleen; two daughters; four grandchildren and four great-grandchildren.
