= Soy Andina =

- Directed by: Mitchell Teplitsky
- Produced by: Peter Gould; Leda Duif; Mitchell Teplitsky
- Starring: Nelida Silva; Cynthia Paniagua
- Cinematography: Raul Gallegos
- Edited by: Diana Logreira; Ingrid Patetta
- Distributed by: Lacuma Films
- Release date: September 12, 2007
- Running time: 70 minutes
- Country: United States
- Languages: English, Spanish

Soy Andina is a 2007 American documentary film directed by Mitchell Teplitsky. It tells the story of two New York dancers and their exploration of mixed Peruvian and American identities.

== Plot ==
Cynthia Paniagua, a modern dancer from Queens with Andean heritage, begins taking lessons with Nelida Silva, an immigrant folk dancer also from the Andes. She travels to Peru to learn more. In 2000, Nelida returns to her native village to host The Patron Saint Festival, and there the two reconnect.

== Release ==
The film was shot over a period of five years and premiered at the Film Society of Lincoln Center in September 2007. The film also screened at the 2007 Los Angeles Latino Film Festival, and the U.S. Embassy organized two screening tours of the film in Peru.
