= Damrosch Park =

Public park in Manhattan, New York

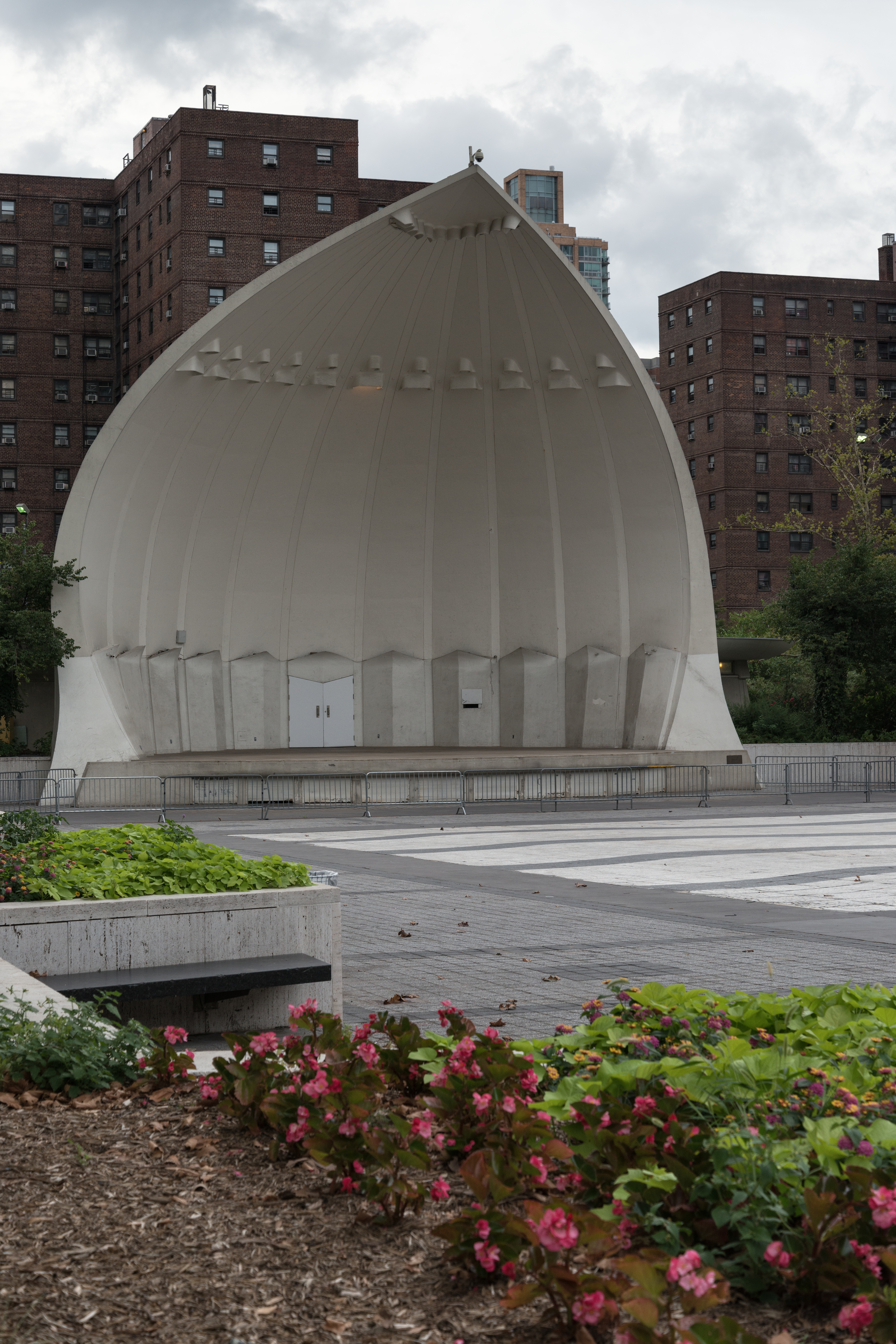
- Interactive map of Damrosch Park
- Location: Amsterdam Avenue and West 62nd Street, Manhattan, New York
- Coordinates: 40.7720°N 73.9846°W
- Area: 2.4 acres (0.97 ha)
- Established: 1969
- Administrator: City of New York Parks and Recreation
- Website: Official website

Buildings of Lincoln Center
Buildings and structures in Lincoln Center:
1 Samuel B. and David Rose Building (includes Walter Reade Theater)
2 Juilliard School
3 Alice Tully Hall
4 Vivian Beaumont Theater (includes Mitzi E. Newhouse Theater and Claire Tow Theater)
5 Elinor Bunin Monroe Film Center
6 David Geffen Hall
7 New York Public Library for the Performing Arts (includes Bruno Walter Auditorium)
8 Metropolitan Opera House
9 Josie Robertson Plaza with Revson Fountain
10 Damrosch Park
11 David H. Koch Theater
12 David Rubenstein Atrium
13 Jazz at Lincoln Center

Damrosch Park is a 2.4-acre (0.97 ha) park at Amsterdam Avenue and West 62nd Street in Lincoln Square, Manhattan, New York City. The park, which includes the Guggenheim Bandshell, is on the south side of the Metropolitan Opera House and west of the David H. Koch Theater at the Lincoln Center for the Performing Arts.

The park is named after the Damrosch family, a family of musicians. Performances take place at the Daniel and Florence Guggenheim Bandshell in the western end of the park above Amsterdam Avenue. The south side has street entrances, and the northeast corner of the park connects directly to the Center's central plaza.

The park is used for large events such as the Lincoln Center Festival in July, Lincoln Center Out of Doors in August, and the Big Apple Circus October through January. In 2013, local residents who felt that these events are inconsistent with the park's status as a park sued to keep the park available to the public year-round. In response to the May 2013 complaint, the city of New York and Lincoln Center evicted the invitation-only, twice-yearly New York Fashion Week the following year.
