= Lincoln Center =

Performing arts venue in New York City

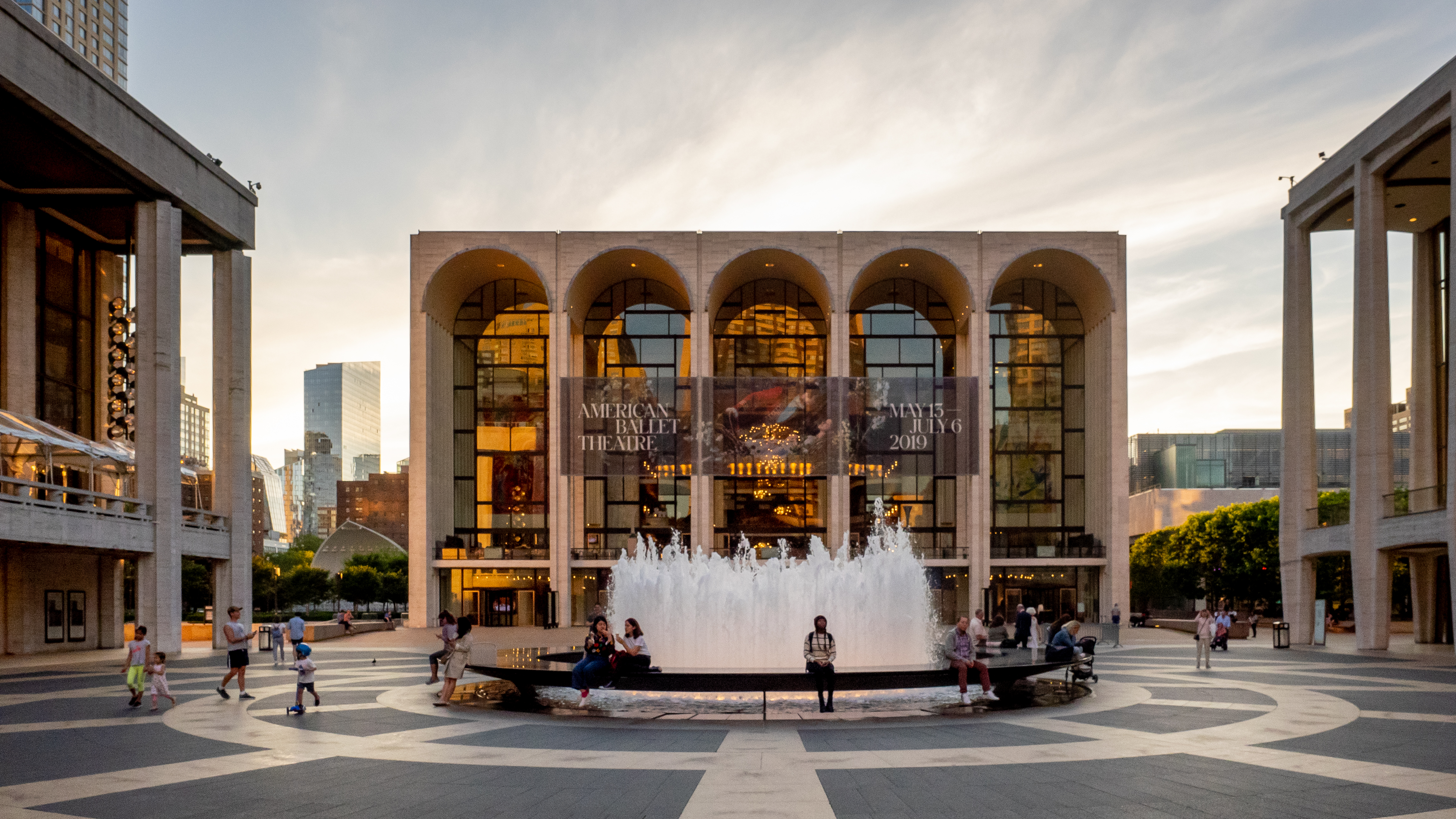
- The David H. Koch Theater (left), The Metropolitan Opera House (center), and David Geffen Hall (right) and the Revson Fountain in front

- Location within Manhattan Location within New York City Location within New York
- Location: 10 Lincoln Center Plaza; New York, NY 10023
- Coordinates: 40°46′21″N 73°59′02″W
- Type: Performing-arts center
- Public transit: New York City Subway: at 66th Street–Lincoln Center; NYCT Bus: M5, M7, M11, M66, M104

Construction
- Built: 1955–1969
- Opened: 1962 (when the center's first venue, Philharmonic Hall, opened)

Website
- lincolncenter.org

Lincoln Center for the Performing Arts (also simply known as Lincoln Center) is a 16.3-acre (6.6-hectare) complex of buildings in the Lincoln Square neighborhood on the Upper West Side of Manhattan. It has thirty indoor and outdoor facilities and is host to five million visitors annually. It houses performing arts organizations including the New York Philharmonic, the Metropolitan Opera, the New York City Ballet, the Chamber Music Society of Lincoln Center, and the Juilliard School.

== History ==
=== Planning ===
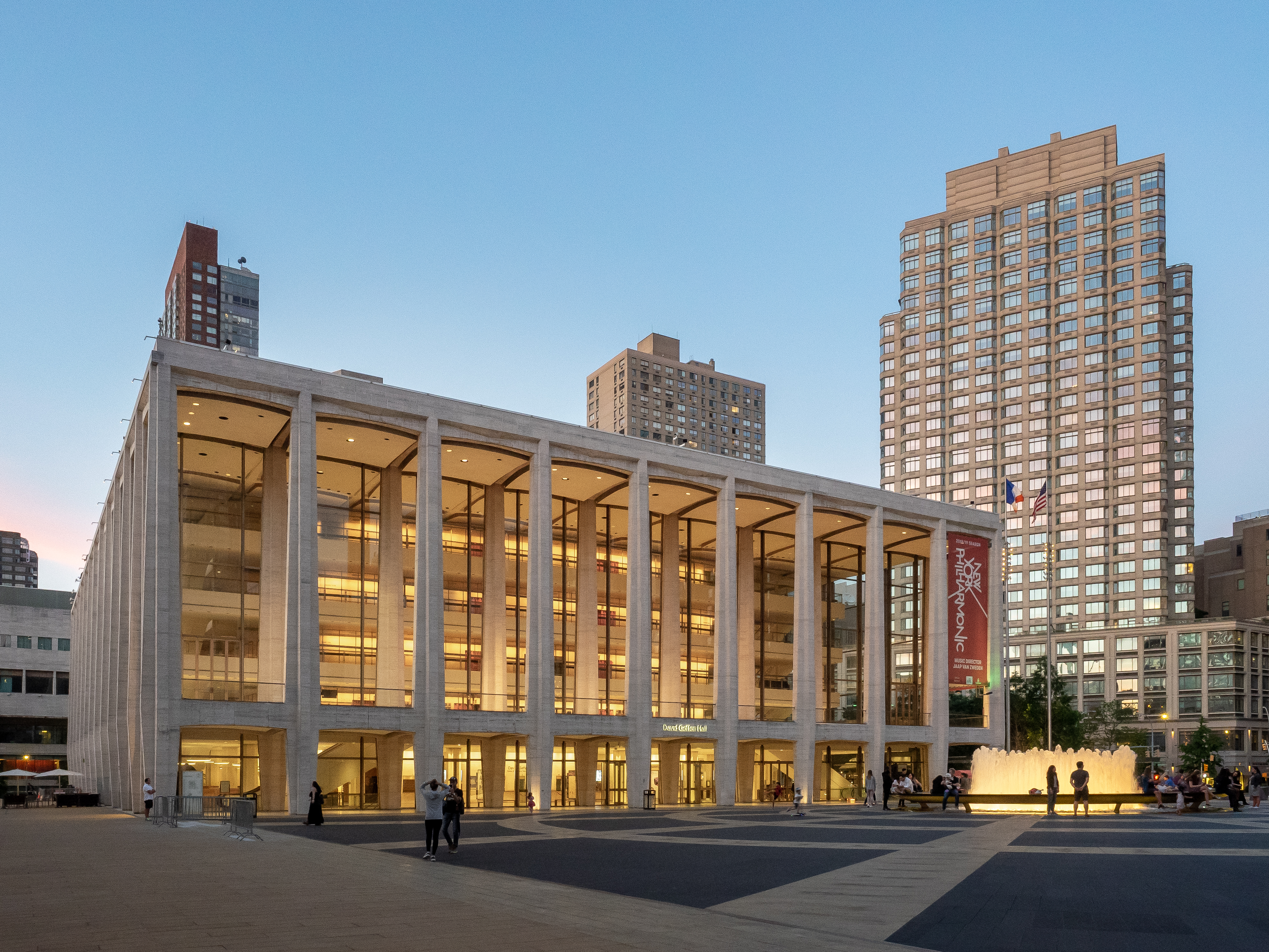
David Geffen Hall, home of the New York Philharmonic in Lincoln Center

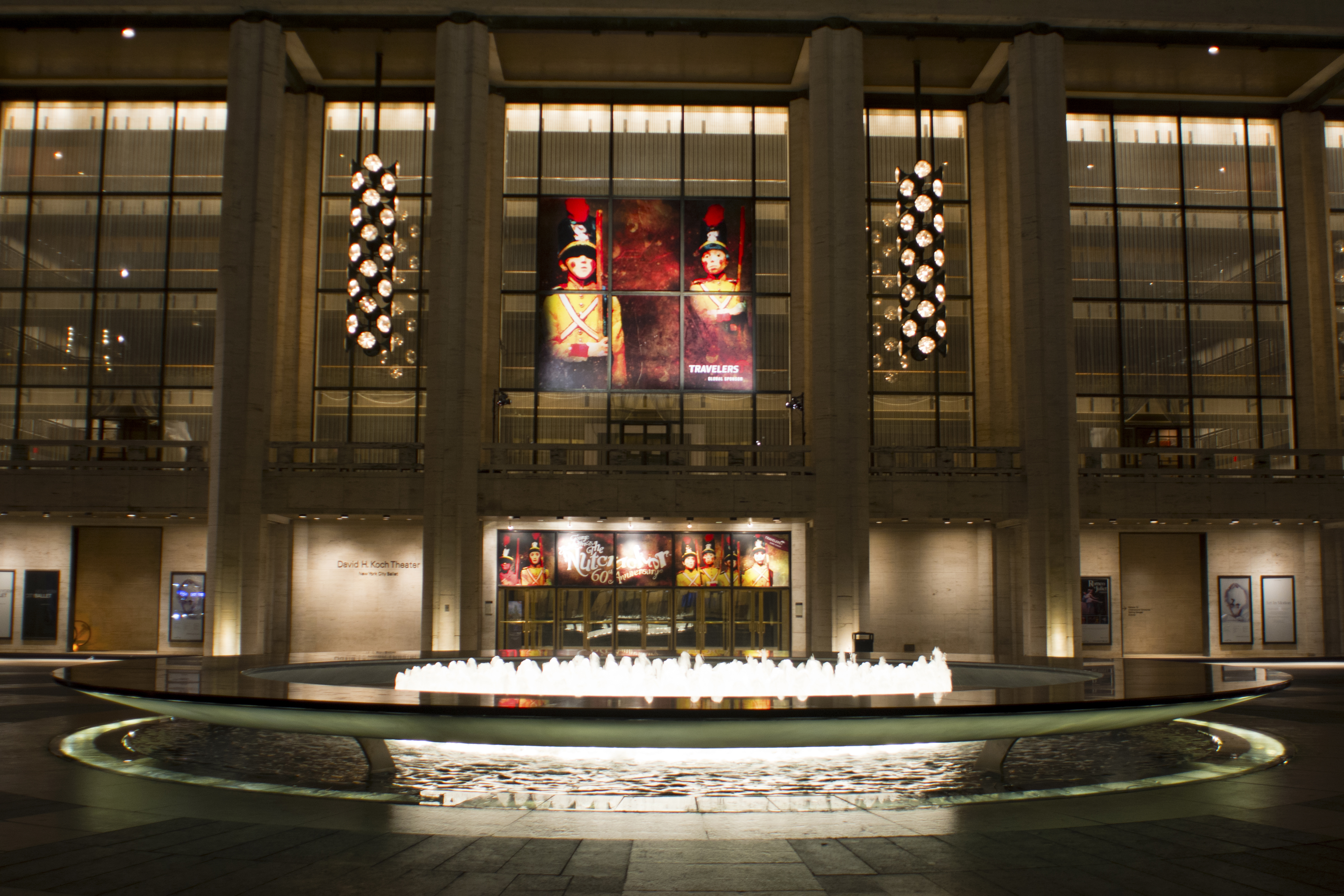
The David H. Koch Theater at Lincoln Center, home of the New York City Ballet

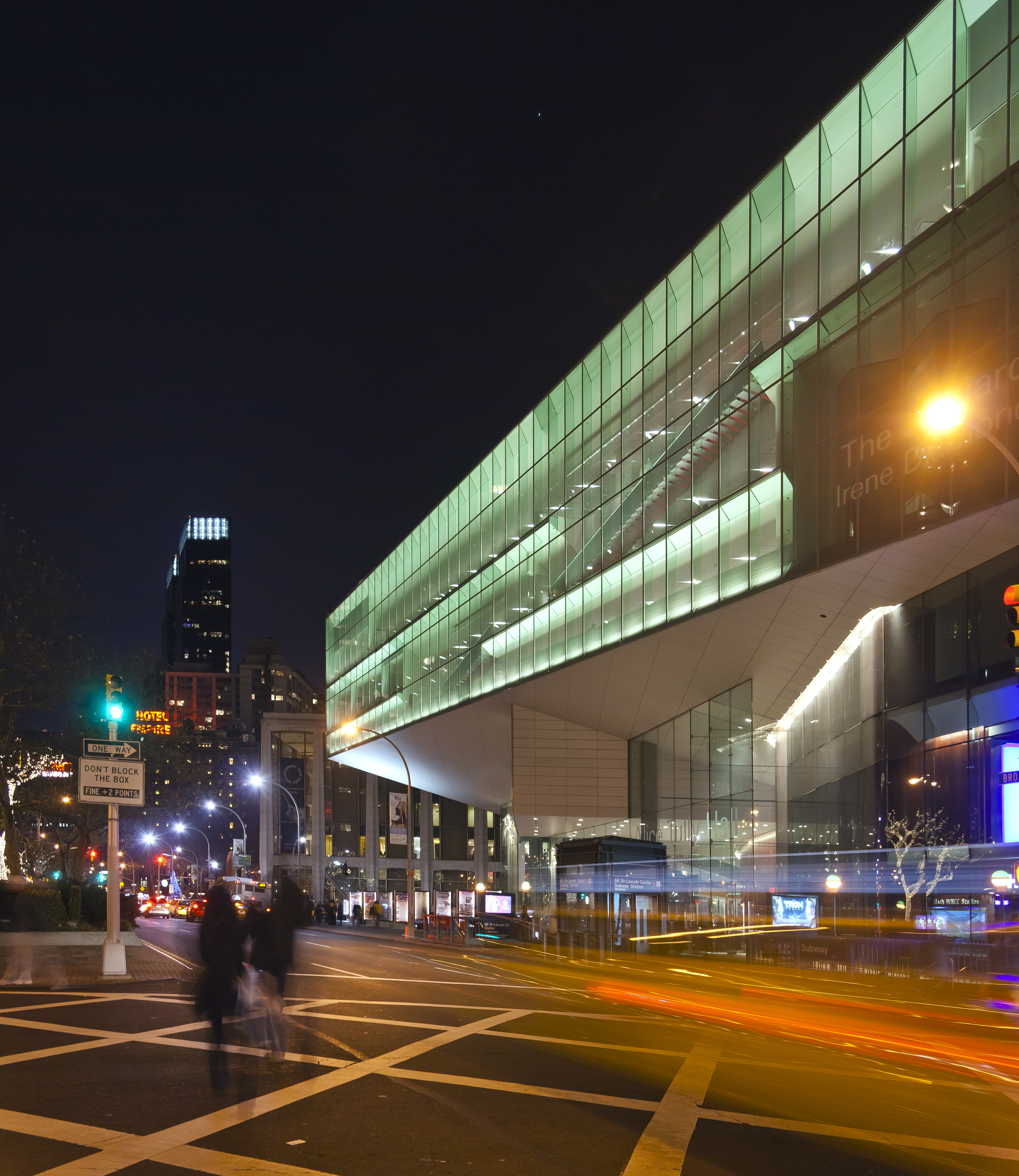
Alice Tully Hall, home of the Chamber Music Society of Lincoln Center

A consortium of civic leaders and others, led by and under the initiative of philanthropist John D. Rockefeller III, built Lincoln Center as part of the "Lincoln Square Renewal Project" during Robert Moses's program of New York's urban renewal in the 1950s and 1960s. Respected architects were contracted to design the major buildings on the site. In the course of acquiring the land for the complex, more than 7,000 residents and 800 businesses from the San Juan Hill area of Lincoln Square were displaced.

Rockefeller was appointed as the Lincoln Center's inaugural president in 1956, and once he resigned, became its chairman in 1961. He is credited with having raised more than half of the $184.5 million in private funds needed to build the complex, including drawing from his own funds; the Rockefeller Brothers Fund also contributed to the project. Numerous architects were hired to build different parts of the center (see § Architects). The center's first three buildings, David Geffen Hall (formerly Avery Fisher Hall, originally named Philharmonic Hall), David H. Koch Theater (formerly the New York State Theater), and the Metropolitan Opera House were opened in 1962, 1964, and 1966, respectively.

It is unclear whether the center was named as a tribute to U.S. President Abraham Lincoln or for its location in the Lincoln Square neighborhood. The name was bestowed on the area in 1906 by the New York City Board of Aldermen, but records give no reason for choosing that name. There has long been speculation that the name came from a local landowner, because the square was previously named Lincoln Square. However, property records from the New York Municipal Archives from that time have no record of a Lincoln surname; they only list the names Johannes van Bruch, Thomas Hall, Stephen De Lancey, James De Lancey, James De Lancey Jr. and John Somerindyck. One speculation is that references to President Lincoln were omitted from the records because the mayor in 1906 was George B. McClellan Jr., son of General George B. McClellan, who was general-in-chief of the Union Army early in the American Civil War and a bitter rival of Lincoln's.

=== Historical timeline ===
- April 21, 1955: The Mayor's Slum Clearance Committee chaired by Robert Moses is approved by the New York City Board of Estimate to designate Lincoln Square for urban renewal.
- November 8, 1955: John D. Rockefeller III is elected as chairman.
- June 22, 1956: Lincoln Center for the Performing Arts, Inc. incorporated.
- October 31, 1956: Lincoln Square Development Plan is approved, many changes to the area are proposed.
- May 14, 1959: Ground-breaking ceremony with U.S. President Dwight D. Eisenhower.
- September 23, 1962: Philharmonic Hall opens.
- April 6, 1964: Lincoln Center Fountain, named for Charles Revson, opens.
- April 23, 1964: New York State Theater opens.
- October 14, 1965: Vivian Beaumont Theater and the Forum (now Mitzi E. Newhouse Theater) open.
- November 30, 1965: The Library & Museum of the Performing Arts opens.
- August 1, 1966: The first indoor festival in the United States, the Midsummer Serenades – A Mozart Festival begins.
- September 16, 1966: The Metropolitan Opera House opens.
- May 22, 1969: Damrosch Park and the Guggenheim Band Shell open.
- September 11, 1969: Alice Tully Hall (named for Alice Tully) opens.
- October 26, 1969: Juilliard School opens.
- September 20, 1973: Philharmonic Hall renamed Avery Fisher Hall.
- May 20, 1974: The Lincoln Center Institute is officially founded.
- October 22, 1974: The Avery Fisher Artist Program is founded to give outstanding American instrumentalists significant recognition on which to continue to build their careers. It includes both The Avery Fisher Prize and the Avery Fisher Career Grants.
- January 30, 1976: The first live telecast of Live from Lincoln Center is broadcast over PBS.
- October 19, 1976: Avery Fisher Hall re-opens after renovation to improve acoustics.
- December 4, 1981: The Big Apple Circus marks its first performances at its winter home in Damrosch Park. The circus has performed every winter at Lincoln Center through the 2016 season when it was forced to liquidate its assets due to continued financial losses.
- September 7, 1982: New York State Theater re-opens after renovation to improve acoustics.
- August 3, 1987: Classical Jazz, Lincoln Center's first concert series devoted exclusively to jazz, begins in Alice Tully Hall.
- November 19, 1990: The Samuel B. and David Rose Building opens, housing the Walter Reade Theater, the Stanley H. Kaplan Penthouse, the Daniel and Joanna S. Rose Rehearsal Studio, the Clark Studio Theater, the School of American Ballet, Juilliard School student residences, and office space for a number of the member organizations.
- January 27, 1991: The Mozart Bicentennial at Lincoln Center opens with concerts held at Avery Fisher Hall and the Metropolitan Opera House, making it the world's largest and most comprehensive tribute to the life and works of Mozart.
- August 25, 1993: The section of 65th Street that runs through Lincoln Center, between Amsterdam Avenue and Broadway, is renamed "Leonard Bernstein Place".
- June 13, 1994: Beverly Sills is elected Chairman of the Board of the Lincoln Center for the Performing Arts, Inc. She is the first woman and the first professional musician to be elected to this position, serving until May 1, 2002.
- January 18, 2001: The Lincoln Center Constituent Development Project is established to implement and oversee the comprehensive reconstruction, renovation, and modernization of Lincoln Center.
- October 18, 2004: Jazz at Lincoln Center opens. The hall is made up of three theaters: the Rose Theater, the Allen Room, and Dizzy's Club Coca-Cola.
- March 20, 2006: Preliminary construction on the West 65th Street Project begins. The Promenade Project, a plan to renovate Josie Robertson Plaza and the Columbus Avenue frontage to the Lincoln Center campus, is announced.
- June 8, 2006: Lincoln Center announces plans to transform the nearby Harmony Atrium into a public space for the arts open to the public, neighbors, students, and center patrons.
- February 22, 2009: Alice Tully Hall reopens after redevelopment.
- September 30, 2009: Opening of the redesigned Charles H. Revson Fountain.
- May 21, 2010: Renovation plans of central and north plazas unveiled.
- June 4, 2012: Claire Tow Theater opens.
- October 1, 2012: The President's Bridge opens over West 65th Street.
- May 15, 2013: Jed Bernstein begins tenure as president.
- October 1, 2013: The New York City Opera files for Chapter 11 bankruptcy reorganization and ceases operation.
- September 24, 2015: Avery Fisher Hall renamed David Geffen Hall.
- January 22, 2016: The New York City Opera resumes performances in the Rose Theater.
- November 16, 2016: Debora Spar becomes Lincoln Center's first woman president after the sudden departure of Jed Bernstein.

=== Construction milestones ===
In 1955, the first city institution to commit to be part of the Lincoln Square Renewal Project, an effort to revitalize the city's west side with a new performing arts complex that would become the Lincoln Center for the Performing Arts, was the Fordham Law School of Fordham University. In 1961, Fordham Law School was the first building to open as part of the renewal project, and in 1968, Fordham College at Lincoln Center welcomed its first students.

The development of the condominium at 3 Lincoln Center, completed in 1991, designed by Lee Jablin of Harman Jablin Architects, made possible the expansion of The Juilliard School and the School of American Ballet.

The center's cultural institutions also have since made use of facilities located away from the main campus. In 2004, the center expanded through the addition of Jazz at Lincoln Center's newly built facilities, the Frederick P. Rose Hall, at the new Time Warner Center (now the Deutsche Bank Center), located a few blocks to the south. In March 2006, the center launched construction on a major redevelopment plan that modernized, renovated, and opened up its campus. Redevelopment was completed in 2012 with the completion of the President's Bridge over West 65th Street.

=== Renovations ===
When first announced in 1999, Lincoln Center's campus-wide redevelopment was to cost $1.5 billion over 10 years and radically transform the campus. The center management held an architectural competition, won by the British architect Norman Foster in 2005, but did not approve a full-scale redesign until 2012, in part because of the need to raise $300 million in construction costs and the New York Philharmonic's fear that it might lose audiences and revenue while it was displaced. Among the architects that have been involved were Frank Gehry; Cooper, Robertson & Partners; Skidmore, Owings & Merrill; Beyer Blinder Belle; Fox & Fowle; Olin Partnership; and Diller & Scofidio.

In March 2006, the center launched the 65th Street Project – part of a major redevelopment plan continuing through the fall of 2012 – to create a new pedestrian promenade designed to improve accessibility and the aesthetics of that area of the campus. Additionally, Alice Tully Hall was modernized and reopened to critical and popular acclaim in 2009 and Film at Lincoln Center expanded with the new Elinor Bunin Munroe Film Center. Topped by a sloping lawn roof, the film center is part of a new pavilion that also houses a destination restaurant named Lincoln, as well as offices. Subsequent projects were added which addressed improvements to the main plazas and Columbus Avenue Grand Stairs. Under the direction of the Lincoln Center Development Project, Diller Scofidio + Renfro in association with FXFOWLE Architects and Beyer Blinder Belle Architects provided the design services. Additionally, Turner Construction Company and RCDolner, LLC were the construction managers for the projects. Another component to redevelopment was the addition of the David Rubenstein Atrium designed by Tod Williams Billie Tsien Architects, a visitors' center and a gateway to the center that offers free performances, day-of-discount tickets, food, and free Wi-Fi.

In 2019, Diamond Schmitt Architects was appointed Design and Executive Architect for the master plan and renovation of David Geffen Hall (previously Avery Fisher Hall) concert theater and masterplan. Diamond Schmitt designed the concert hall and back-of-house spaces while TWBTA designed the public spaces. When the Hall reopened in 2022, the main auditorium was renamed the Wu Tsai Theatre after a $50 million donation from Joseph Tsai and Clara Wu Tsai.

In 2023, Lincoln Center announced plans to renovate the western end of the complex, which included the removal of a retaining wall separating Lincoln Center from the Amsterdam Houses housing development to the west. Hood Design Studio and Weiss/Manfredi were hired to design the renovation of the western part of Lincoln Center. At the time, access to Lincoln Center from the west was possible only by climbing 40 steps near the New York Public Library for the Performing Arts on 65th Street. Details of the project were announced in May 2025; the project would cost $335 million and include a new Amsterdam Avenue entrance, park, and outdoor performance area. About 200 feet (61 m) of the retaining wall north of 62nd Street would be replaced by the new entrance.

== Architects ==
Buildings of Lincoln Center
Buildings and structures in Lincoln Center:
1 Samuel B. and David Rose Building (includes Walter Reade Theater)
2 Juilliard School
3 Alice Tully Hall
4 Vivian Beaumont Theater (includes Mitzi E. Newhouse Theater and Claire Tow Theater)
5 Elinor Bunin Monroe Film Center
6 David Geffen Hall
7 New York Public Library for the Performing Arts (includes Bruno Walter Auditorium)
8 Metropolitan Opera House
9 Josie Robertson Plaza with Revson Fountain
10 Damrosch Park
11 David H. Koch Theater
12 David Rubenstein Atrium
13 Jazz at Lincoln Center

Architects who designed buildings at the center include:

- Diller Scofidio + Renfro: Public spaces, Hypar Pavilion and Lincoln Ristorante, The Juilliard School, Alice Tully Hall, School of American Ballet, Josie Robertson Plaza, Revson Fountain, President's Bridge (over 65th Street) and Infoscape
- Max Abramovitz: David Geffen Hall, original design of Josie Robertson Plaza (with Wallace K. Harrison and Philip Johnson)
- Pietro Belluschi: The Juilliard School (including Alice Tully Hall). Modified by Diller Scofidio + Renfro in association with FXFOWLE Architects
- Gordon Bunshaft: The New York Public Library for the Performing Arts.
- Wallace Harrison: the center's master plan, the Metropolitan Opera House, and original design of Josie Robertson Plaza (with Max Abramovitz and Philip Johnson)
- Lee S Jablin: 3 Lincoln Center, the adjacent condominium built by a private developer
- Philip Johnson: New York State Theater, now known as the David H. Koch Theater, original design of Josie Robertson Plaza (with Wallace K. Harrison and Max Abramovitz) and original Revson Fountain
- Eero Saarinen: Vivian Beaumont Theater
- Davis, Brody and Associates: The Samuel B. and David Rose Building.
- Billie Tsien, Tod Williams: The David Rubenstein Atrium
- Hugh Hardy/H3 Hardy Collaboration Architecture LLC: The Claire Tow Theater
- WET Design: Revson Fountain
- Nina Rappaport and Ken Smith
- Diamond Schmitt Architects: David Geffen Hall masterplan and Wu Tsai Theater

=== Constituent structures ===
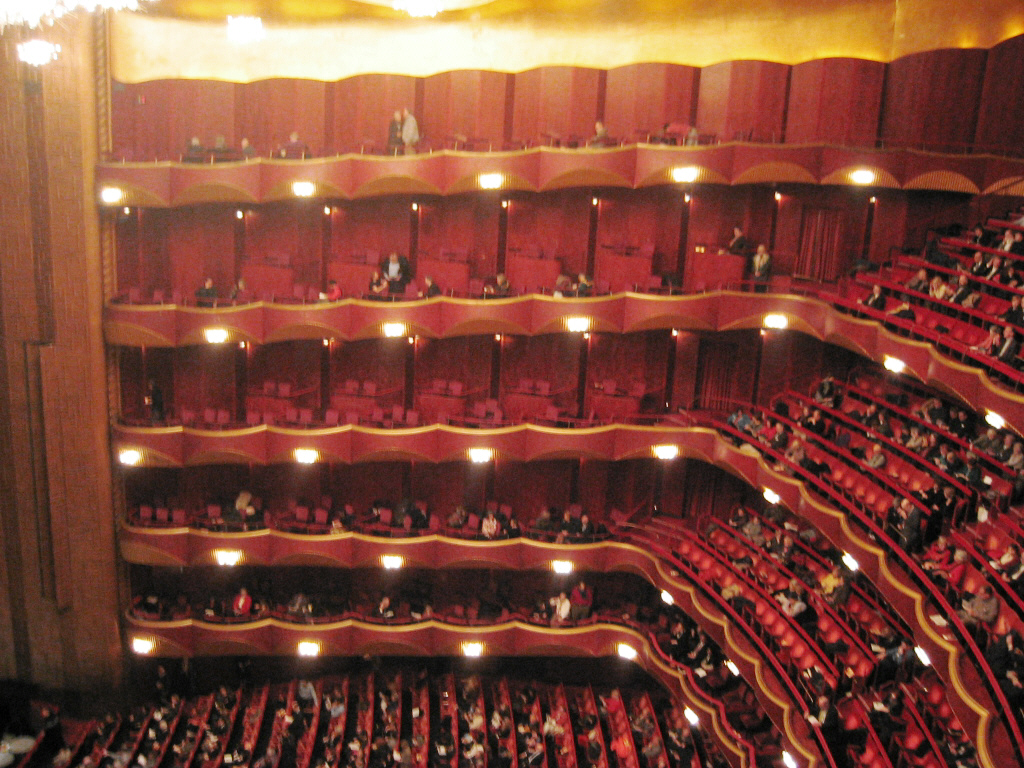
Auditorium of the Metropolitan Opera House at Lincoln Center for the Performing Arts

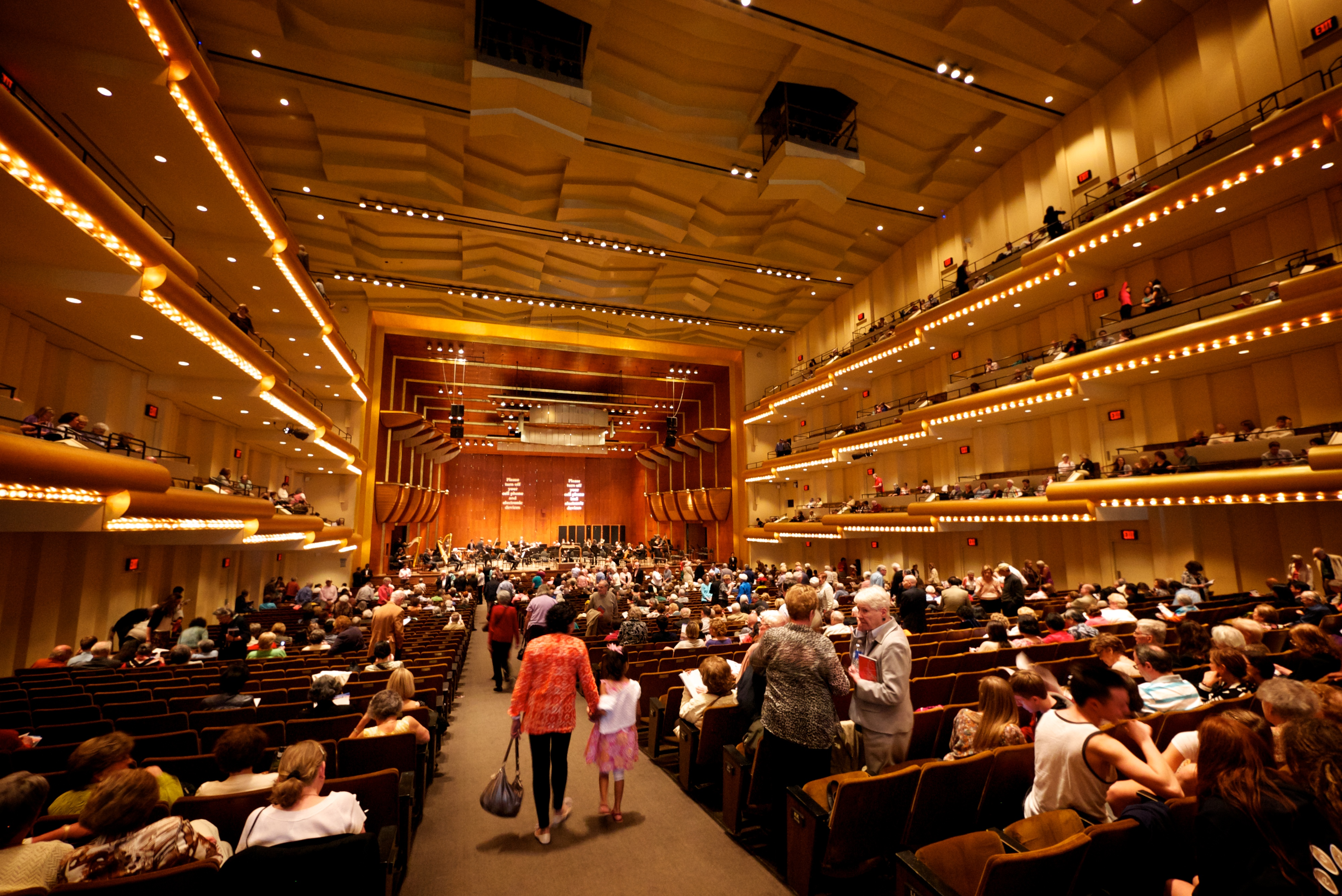
Interior of the David Geffen Hall before a concert by the New York Philharmonic

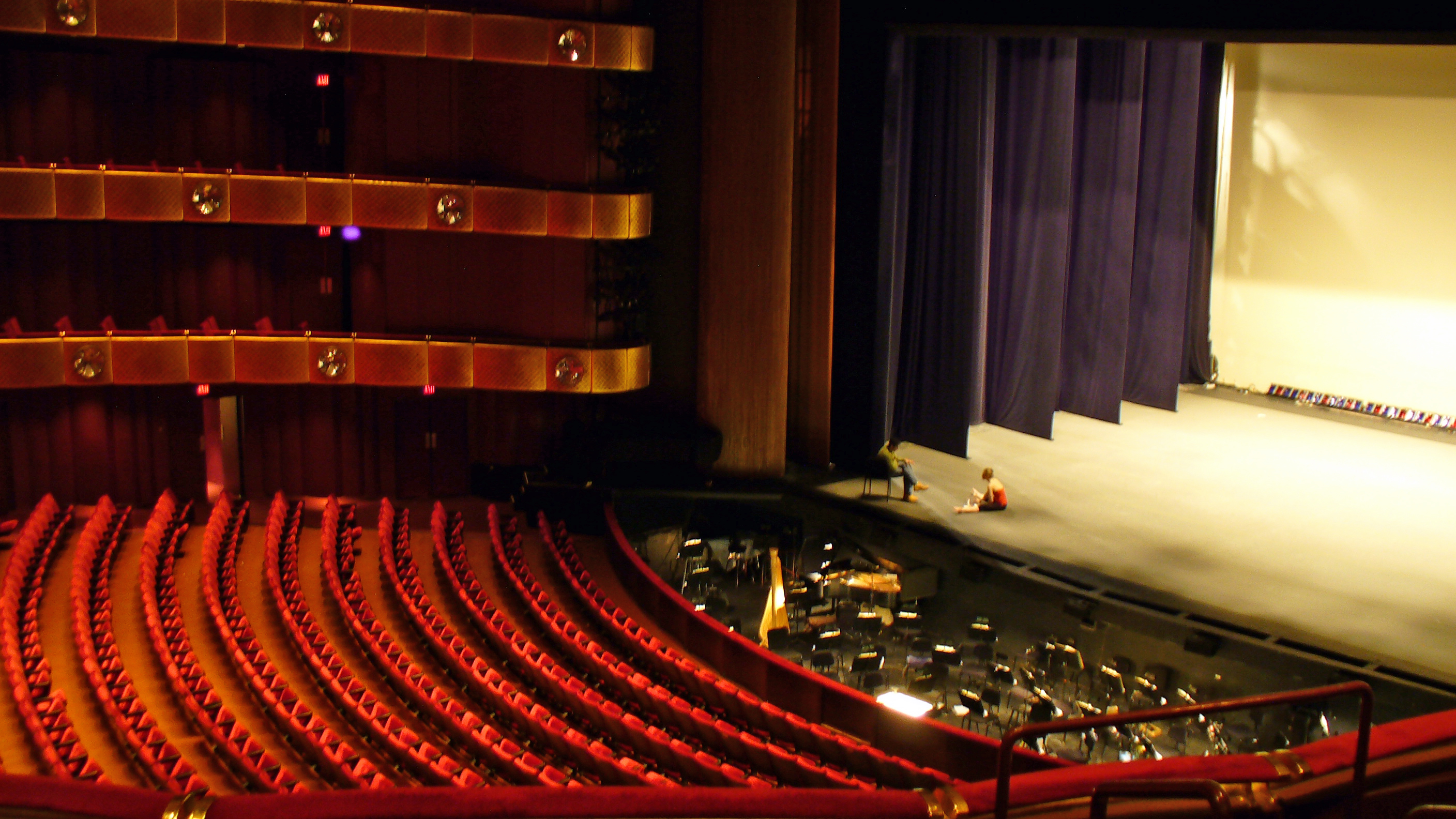
Interior of the David H. Koch Theater

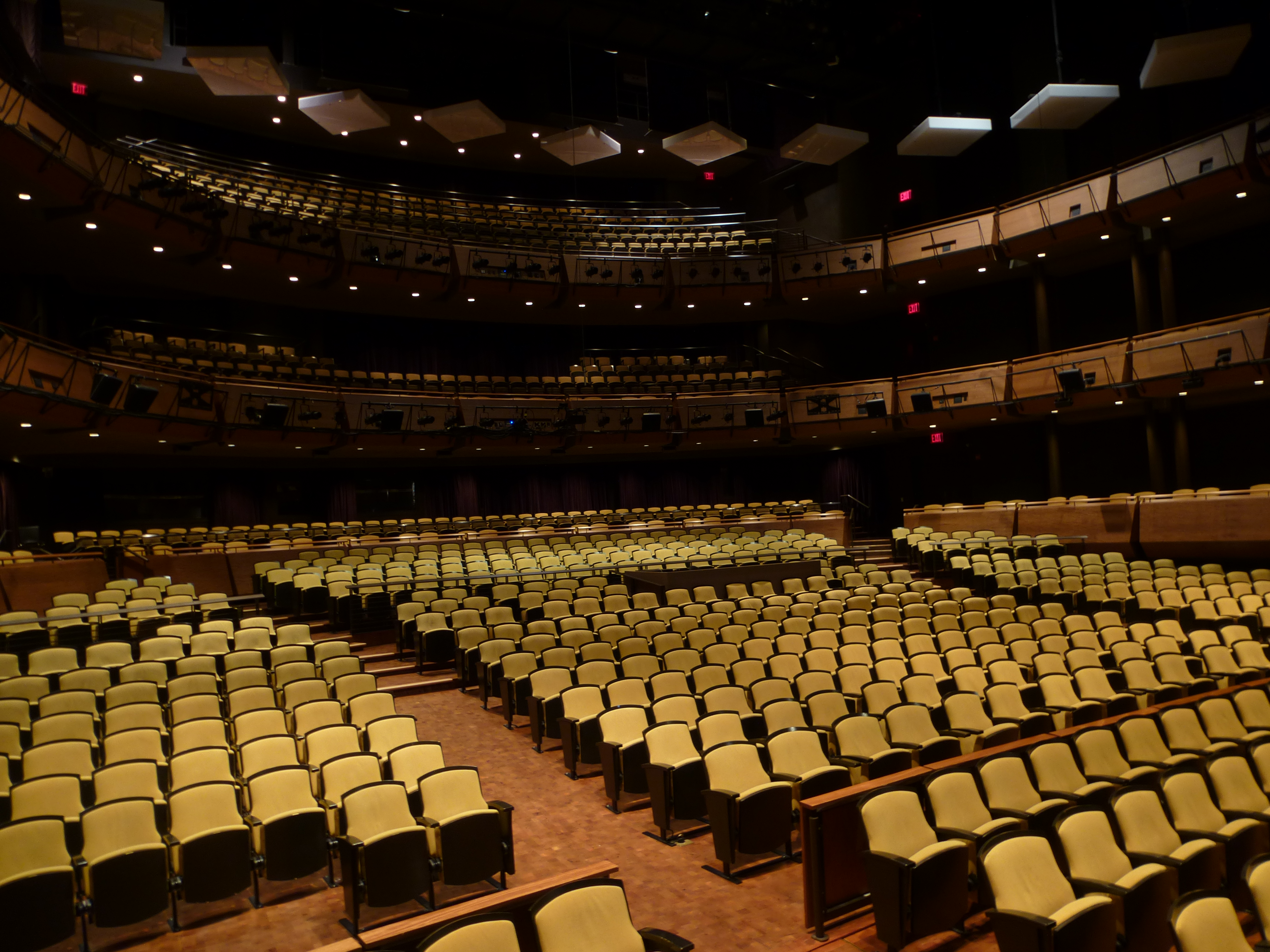
Interior of the Rose Theater

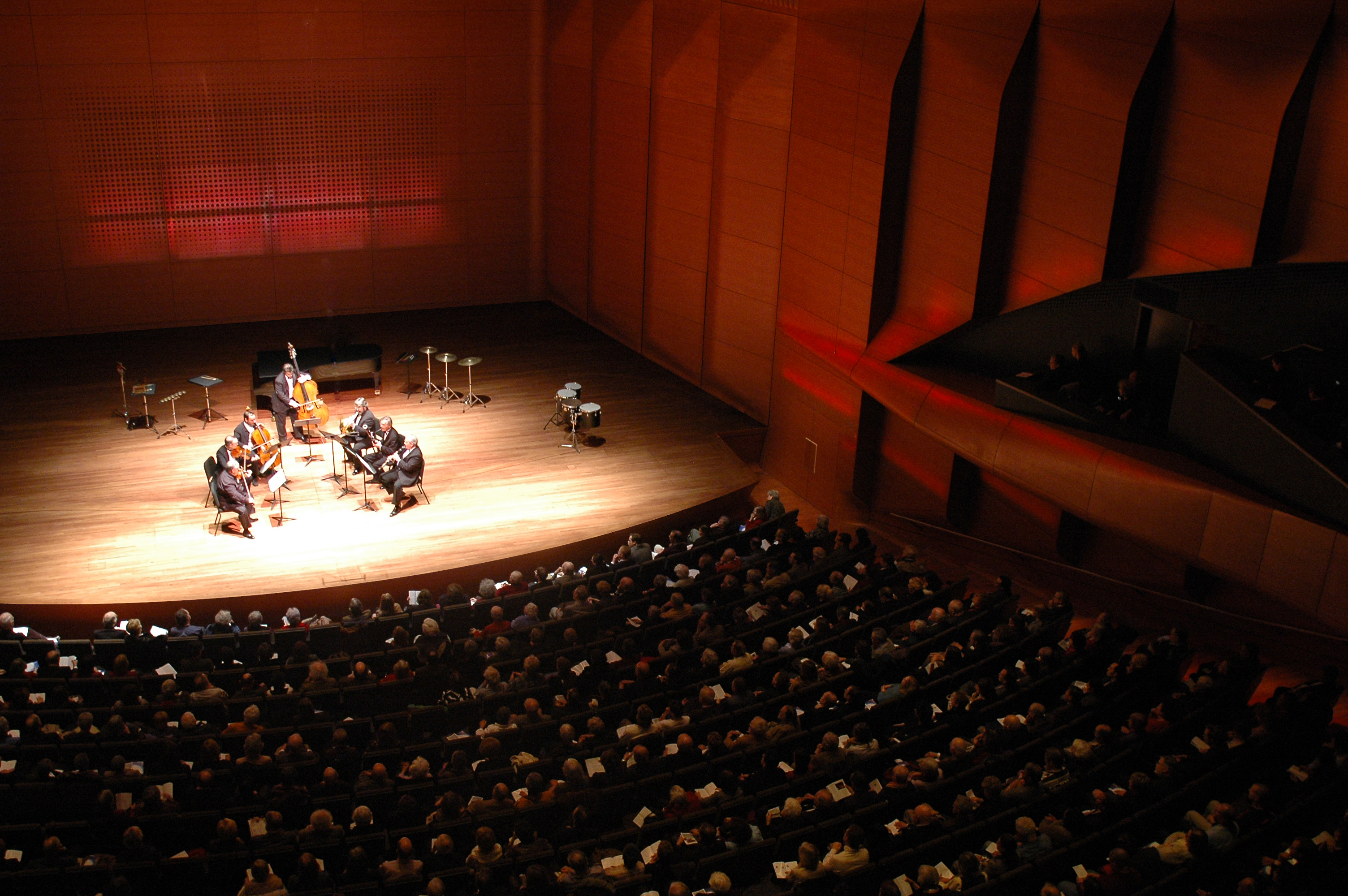
Adrienne Arsht Stage, inside Alice Tully Hall

The center has 30 indoor and outdoor performance facilities including:

- Metropolitan Opera House: a 3,900-seat opera house; the home stage of the Metropolitan Opera; as well as List Hall
- Wu Tsai Theater (formerly Philharmonic Hall and Avery Fisher Hall): a 2,200-seat concert hall; the home stage of the New York Philharmonic
- David H. Koch Theater (formerly New York State Theater): a 2,586-seat theater; constructed as the home of the New York City Ballet, it is also the former home of the New York City Opera and the Music Theater of Lincoln Center companies
- Alice Tully Hall: a 1,095-seat concert hall located within the Juilliard School building; the home stage of The Chamber Music Society of Lincoln Center
- Vivian Beaumont Theater: a 1,080-seat Broadway theater; operated since 1985 as the main stage of Lincoln Center Theater; previously occupied by The Repertory Theater of Lincoln Center (1965–1973) and The New York Shakespeare Festival (1973–1977)
- Mitzi E. Newhouse Theater (originally known as the Forum): a 299-seat theater; operated by Lincoln Center Theater for its Off-Broadway-style productions
- Film at Lincoln Center, which presents films daily at:
  - The Walter Reade Theater: a 268-seat movie theater.
  - Elinor Bunin Munroe Film Center: home to the Francesca Beale Theater, Howard Gilman Theater, and the Amphitheater
- Claire Tow Theater: a 131-seat theater operated by Lincoln Center Theater to house more experimental productions
- Bruno Walter Auditorium at the New York Public Library for the Performing Arts
- The David Rubenstein Atrium: a facility on Broadway between 62nd and 63rd Streets; includes a public visitors' and discount-ticketing facility with amenities that include free performances and a café
- The Clark Studio Theater: a 120-seat dance theater; a part of the facilities of Lincoln Center Education
- Damrosch Park: an outdoor amphitheater with a bowl-style stage known as the Guggenheim Band Shell;
- Daniel and Joanna S. Rose Rehearsal Studio
- Josie Robertson Plaza: the center's central plaza, featuring the campus' fountain; the three main buildings (Metropolitan Opera House, David Geffen Hall, and David H. Koch Theater) face onto this plaza; used as an outdoor venue at times
- Juilliard School: a facility housing the school of the same name: building also incorporates Morse Recital Hall, Paul Recital Hall, Stephanie P. McClelland Drama Theater, Rosemary and Meredith Willson Theater, Peter Jay Sharp Theater, and the Harold and Mimi Steinberg Drama Studio (Room 301).
- Stanley H. Kaplan Penthouse: a nightclub-style venue; used for intimate concerts, "Meet the Artist" and Great Performers events, lectures, and other events where a small, intimate space is preferred; was also used for jazz performances prior to the construction of the new Jazz at Lincoln Center facilities
- Jazz at Lincoln Center: while a part of the center, it is located separately in the Frederick P. Rose Hall complex within the Deutsche Bank Center at Columbus Circle. It consists of the following performance and related facilities:
  - The Appel Room: a 508-seat amphitheater with 50-foot (15-metre) glass wall overlooking Central Park; from 2011 to 2013, it was used as the studio for Anderson Live, a daytime-television talk show hosted by Anderson Cooper
  - Dizzy's Club: a nightclub-style venue that allows jazz to be performed in its traditional venue
  - Rose Theater: a 1,094-seat concert hall designed for jazz performances. Rose Theater is the largest performing space at Jazz at Lincoln Center. It consists of three floors. The first floor is orchestra, the second floor is Mezzanine, and the third floor is balcony.
  - Irene Diamond Education Center: a rehearsal, recording and classroom facility
- Other outdoor venues include Hearst Plaza, Barclay's Capital Grove, and Broadway Plaza.

== Resident organizations ==
The center serves as home for eleven resident arts organizations:

- Lincoln Center for the Performing Arts, Inc.
- The Chamber Music Society of Lincoln Center
- Film at Lincoln Center (sponsor of the New York Film Festival)
- Jazz at Lincoln Center
- Juilliard School
- Lincoln Center Theater
- Metropolitan Opera
- New York City Ballet
- New York Philharmonic
- New York Public Library for the Performing Arts
- School of American Ballet

=== Lincoln Center for the Performing Arts ===
Lincoln Center for the Performing Arts (LCPA) is one of the eleven resident organizations, and serves as presenter of artistic programming, leader in arts and education and community relations, and manager of the center's campus. LCPA has some 5,000 programs, initiatives, and events annually, and its programs include American Songbook, Great Performers, Lincoln Center Festival, Lincoln Center Out of Doors, Midsummer Night Swing, the Mostly Mozart Festival, Target Free Thursdays, the White Light Festival and the Emmy Award–winning Live from Lincoln Center.

In July 2006, the LCPA announced it would join with publishing company John Wiley & Sons to publish at least 15 books on performing arts, and would draw on the Lincoln Center Institute's educational background and archives.

== Cultural Innovation Fund ==
Lincoln Center Cultural Innovation Fund is the first of its kind as a grant program that seeks to make the arts accessible to all people, focusing on those who live in some of New York City's poorest neighborhoods. Partnering with the Rockefeller Foundation, the new pilot grant program offers one-time grants to non-profit organizations to provide cultural activities in these communities in the diverse neighborhoods of Central Brooklyn and the South Bronx. Each of the 12 grantees will receive support and financial backing for their project based on organizational budget size. These are one-year long projects, and grant amounts range from $50,000 to $100,000. The over-all goal of the program is to support non-profit organizations in creating cultural innovative strategies that cultivate participation in the arts as well as increase the range and availability of cultural activities to underserved communities.

== See also ==
- Essentially Ellington High School Jazz Band Competition and Festival
- List of museums and cultural institutions in New York City
