= Revson Fountain =

Fountain in Manhattan, New York, U.S.

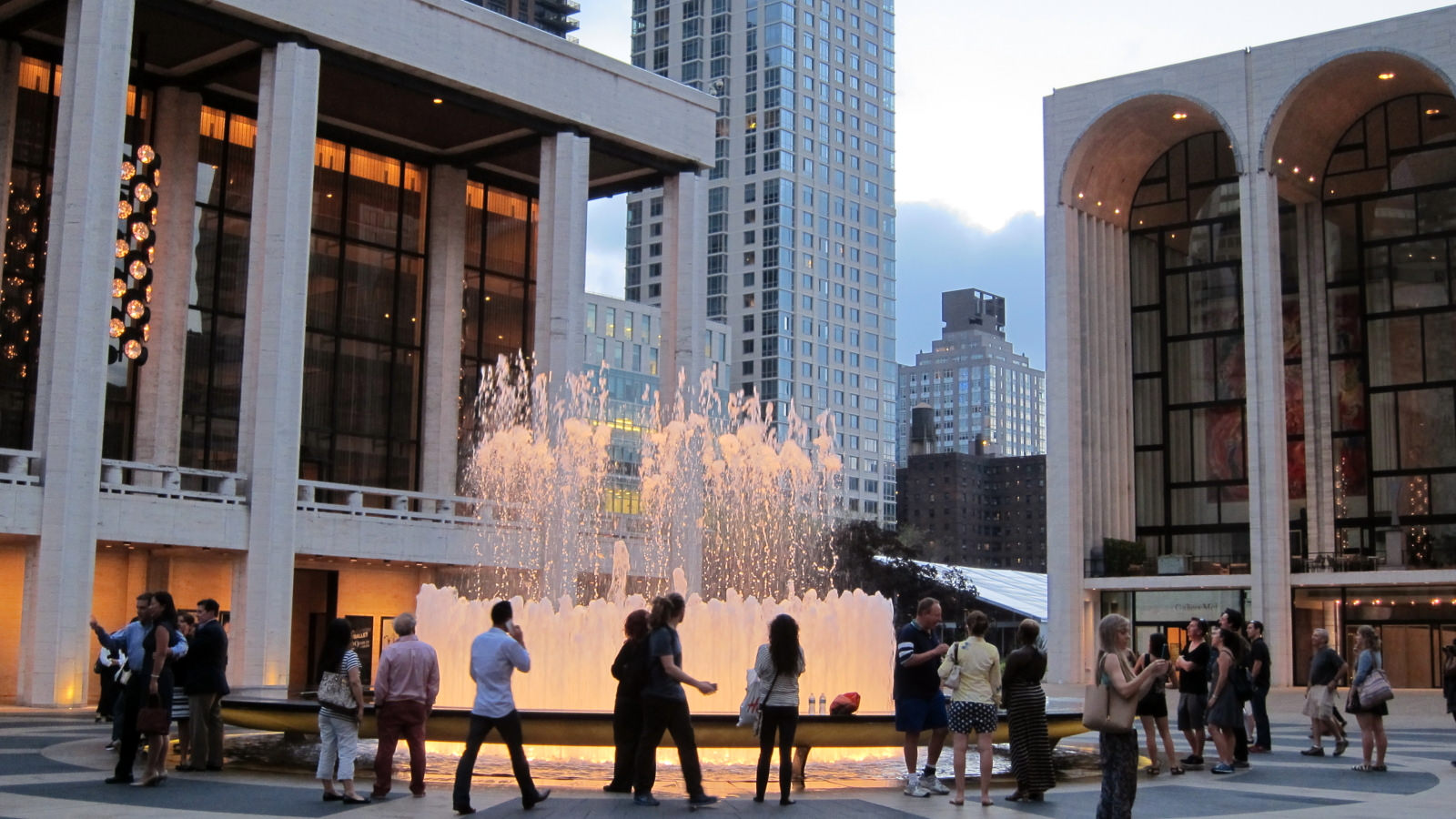
- The redesigned fountain in 2015
- Completion date: 6 April 1964; 30 September 2009
- Location: Manhattan, New York City; 40.772319°N 73.983404°W

Revson Fountain is a fountain installed in the Lincoln Center for the Performing Arts, a complex of buildings in the Lincoln Square neighborhood of the borough of Manhattan in New York City. The fountain was dedicated in 1964 and a redesign was completed in 2009.

== History ==
We conceived it as a lighted, glowing, moving feature for the plaza and gave it the focal point a fireplace gives a home.

— Philip C. Johnson, architect, quoted in March 7, 1964 New York Times article.

Designed by Philip Johnson Associates, the fountain was dedicated on April 6, 1964. It was originally called the Lincoln Center fountain; its namesake is Charles Revson. The fountain was funded by the Revlon Foundation in 1962.

Diller Scofidio + Renfro, the lead architects of the 2006 renovation of Lincoln Center, made several proposals to redesign the fountain, eventually changing the perimeter bench to a floating granite disk; the fountain itself was rebuilt by WET Design from 2007 to 2009. Andrew Dolkart objected to the redesign: "It’s the thing that upsets me most of all about what's happened at Lincoln Center. They thought that they needed to spend a lot of money ripping out Philip Johnson's fountain and putting in something new instead of restoring something that worked well." The rebuilt fountain debuted on September 30, 2009, at a ceremony attended by members of Charles Revson's family.

== Design ==
Buildings of Lincoln Center
Buildings and structures in Lincoln Center:
1 Samuel B. and David Rose Building (includes Walter Reade Theater)
2 Juilliard School
3 Alice Tully Hall
4 Vivian Beaumont Theater (includes Mitzi E. Newhouse Theater and Claire Tow Theater)
5 Elinor Bunin Monroe Film Center
6 David Geffen Hall
7 New York Public Library for the Performing Arts (includes Bruno Walter Auditorium)
8 Metropolitan Opera House
9 Josie Robertson Plaza with Revson Fountain
10 Damrosch Park
11 David H. Koch Theater
12 David Rubenstein Atrium
13 Jazz at Lincoln Center

As originally designed, the fountain employed 568 jets and 88 lights with a combined illumination power of 26 kW. It was 38 feet (12 m) in diameter and was computer controlled, capable of shooting water 150 feet (46 m) in the air. J. S. Hamel of Hamel and Lancer was credited with engineering the fountain. The core of the fountain was an array of 40 jets arranged in a 6-foot (1.8 m) diameter circle around 16 lights capable of throwing water 30 ft (9.1 m) in the air; there were two larger concentric rings with smaller jets outside the core. The total combined flowrate of all the nozzles was 9,000 US gal/min (570 L/s).

The water level of the fountain was elevated from the plaza level in the original design, which used a curb and bench around the perimeter of the retaining pool; during the redesign, the water level was lowered to the level of the plaza and the bench was reduced to a circular rim floating on slim supports. The redesigned fountain contains 353 jets arrayed in three concentric rings and 272 lights with a total illumination power of 27.2 kW. After the redesign, the fountain is capable of shooting water as high as 60 feet (18 m) in the air; 24 pumps move up to 16,500 US gal/min (1,040 L/s).

== In popular media ==
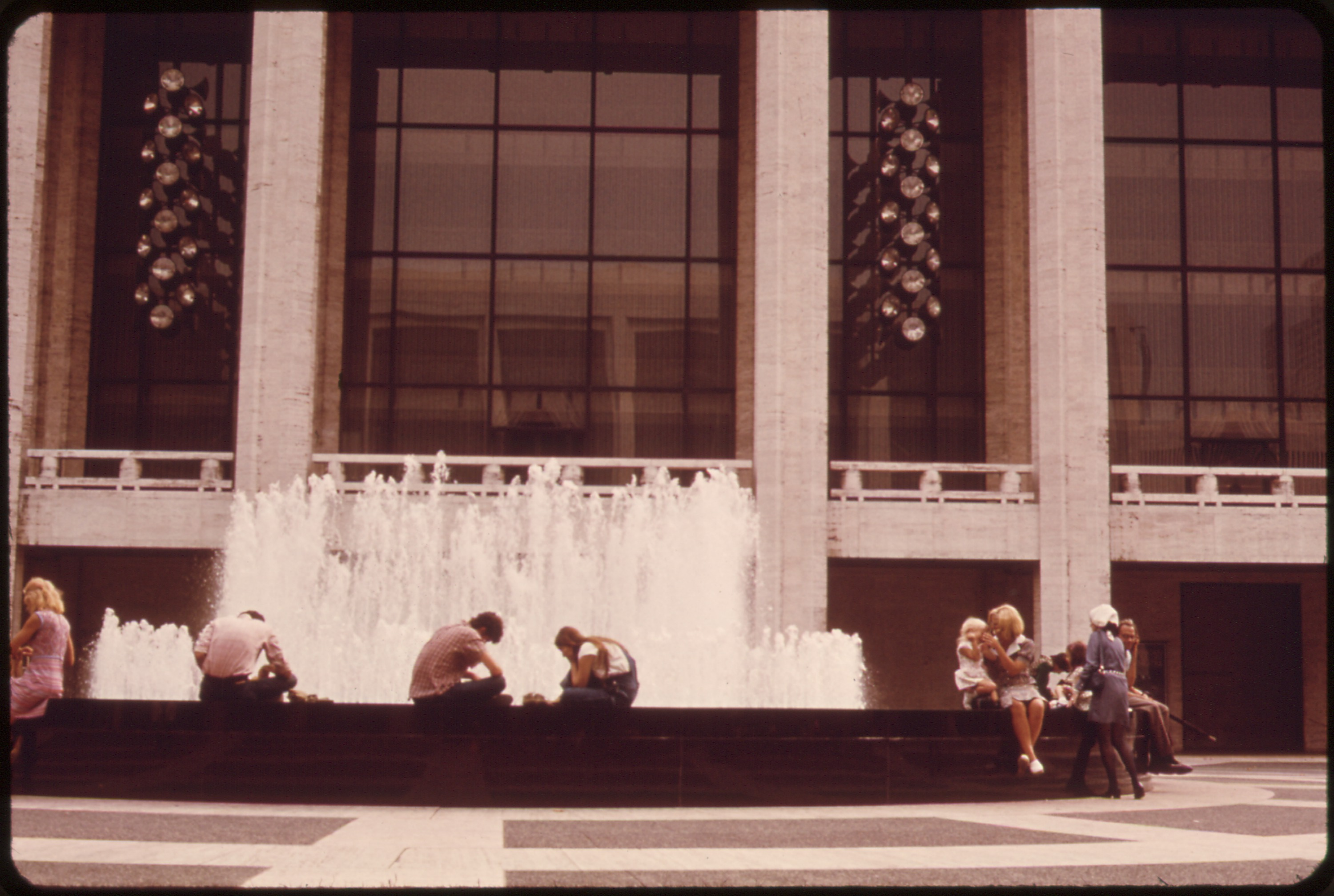
Original fountain design; photographed by Suzanne Szasz for Documerica in August 1973.

Revson Fountain has been featured in several notable films set in New York City, including:

- The Producers (1967)
- Sweet Charity (1969)
- On a Clear Day You Can See Forever (1970)
- Godspell (1973)
- Manhattan (1979)
- Ghostbusters (1984)
- Moonstruck (1987)
- Sweet Home Alabama (2002)

In 2017, the water in Revson Fountain was dyed bright yellow during a prank.
