= Lincoln Square, Manhattan =

Square and neighborhood in New York City

Coordinates: 40.773828°N 73.9844722°W

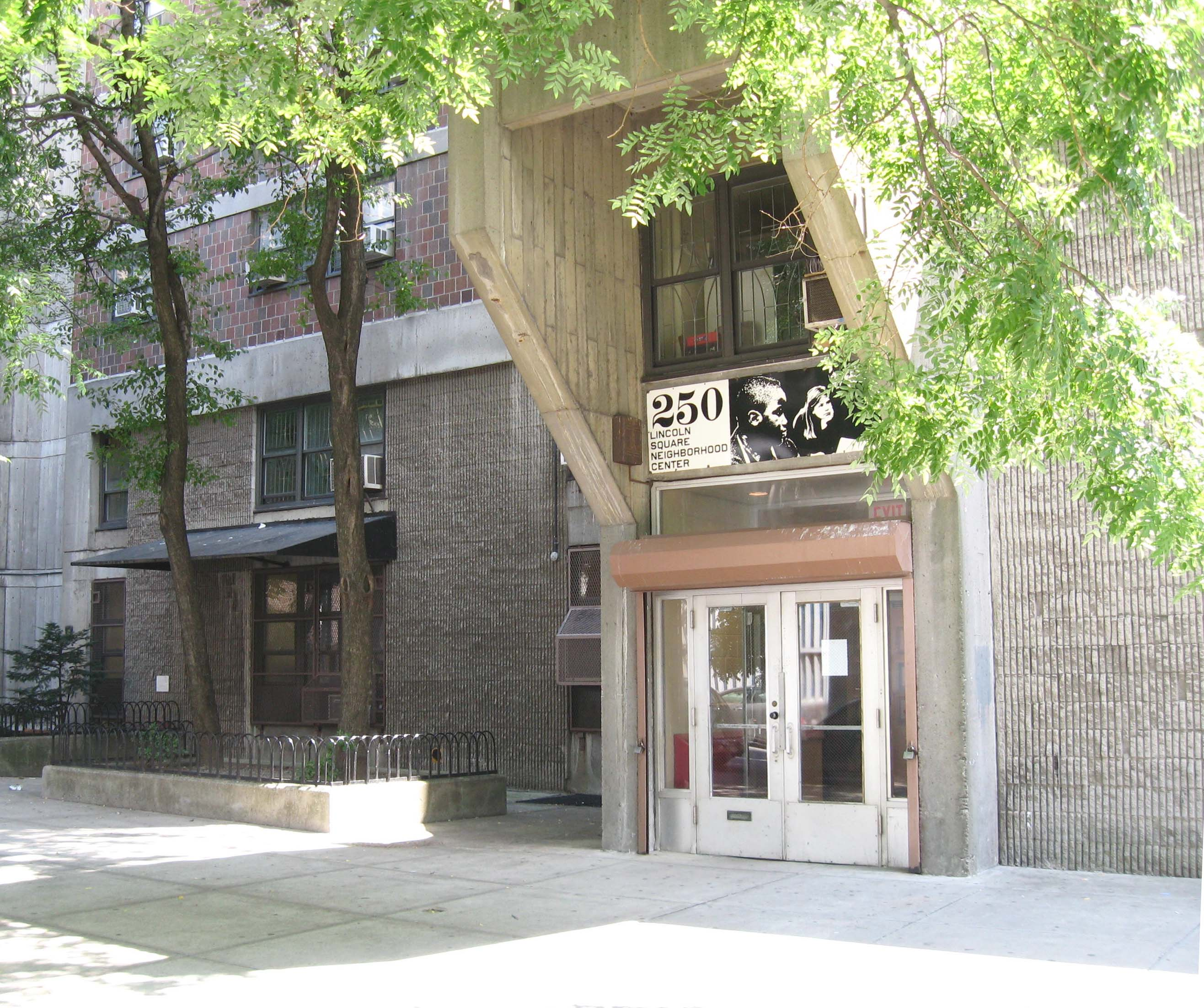
Lincoln Square Neighborhood Center

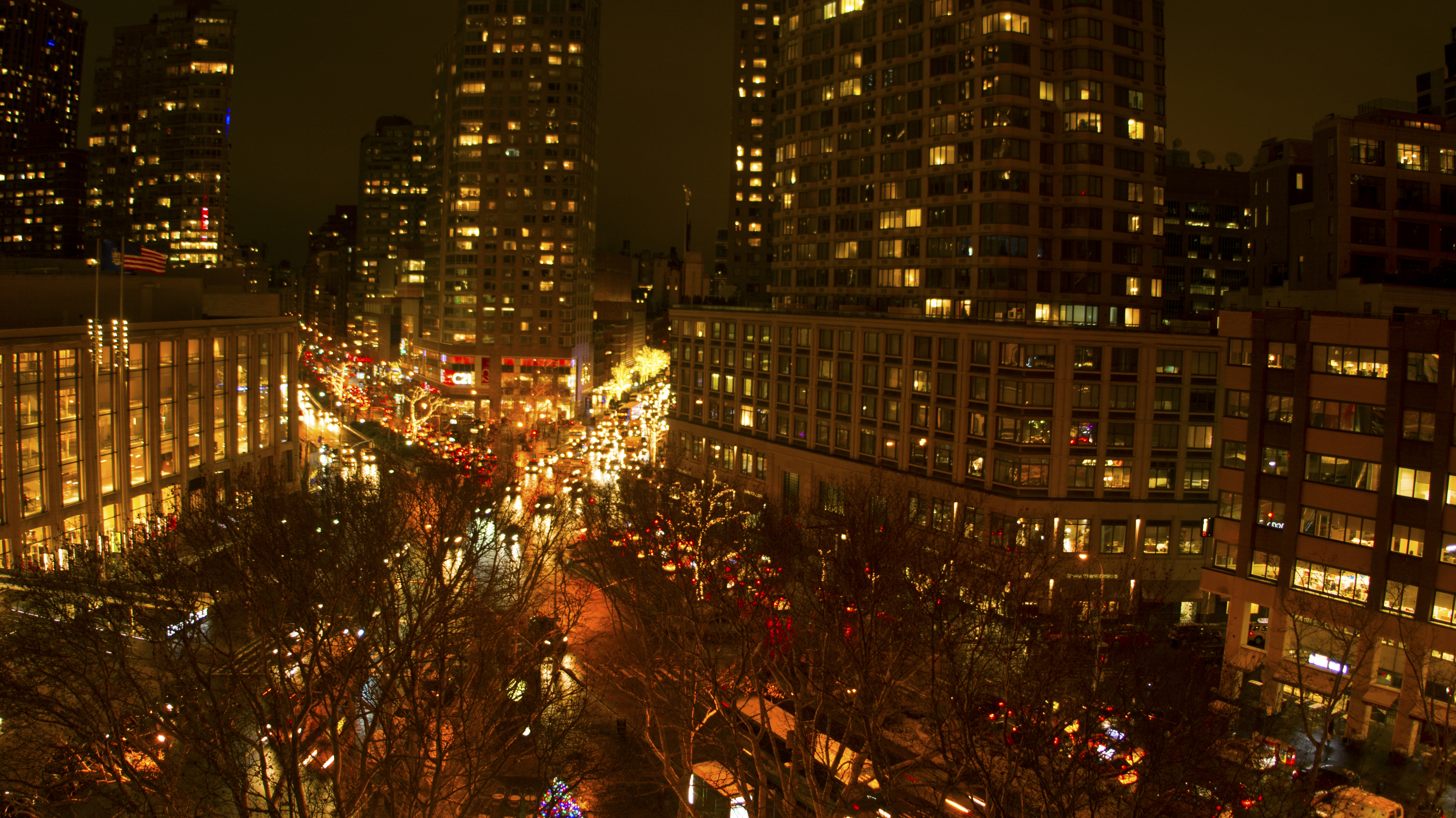
Lincoln Square at night

Location of Lincoln Square on the Upper West Side of Manhattan, one block west of Central Park

Lincoln Square is the name of both a square and the surrounding neighborhood on the Upper West Side of Manhattan in New York City. Lincoln Square is centered on the intersection of Broadway and Columbus Avenue, between West 65th and 66th streets. The neighborhood is bounded by Columbus and Amsterdam avenues to the east and west, and 66th and 63rd streets to the north and south, respectively. However, the term can be extended to refer to the neighborhood between 59th and 72nd streets. It is bounded by Hell's Kitchen, Riverside South, Central Park, and the rest of the Upper West Side. The Walt Disney Company’s New York City campus was located here, including ABC News, ESPN, Hulu, and studios for WABC-TV.

The area includes the 66th Street–Lincoln Center station served by the New York City Subway's 1 and 2 trains, and is anchored by Lincoln Center, a growing collection of performing arts venues, and the Manhattan campus of Fordham University.

Lincoln Square is part of Manhattan Community District 7 and its primary ZIP Code is 10023. It is patrolled by the 20th Precinct of the New York City Police Department.

== History ==
Lincoln Square is located on the site of San Juan Hill, a historical community once comprising a predominantly African American neighborhood of tenements. San Juan Hill was generally bordered by Amsterdam Avenue to the east, West End Avenue to the west, 59th Street to the south, and 65th Street to the north. It has been suggested that the area was named after the 10th Cavalry that fought with Theodore Roosevelt at the Battle of San Juan Hill during the Spanish–American War, but this is not certain. It may have been the most heavily populated African-American neighborhood in Manhattan in the early 20th century; one of its blocks housed almost 5,000 people.

Notable residents had included Thelonious Monk, who came to live there in 1922. In addition to the significant African American community, there was also an Afro-Caribbean community there, which has left its traces in the Bye-ya and Bemsha Swing compositions of Thelonious Monk, co-written much later with Denzil Best, who also grew up in this neighborhood. James P. Johnson also lived in the neighborhood in the 1910s and 1920s, during which time he composed the music for the "Charleston" dance.

In 1940, the New York City Housing Authority characterized the area as "the worst slum section in the City of New York" and made plans to renew the area by demolishing the old tenements. The Amsterdam Housing Projects were built on the cleared land in 1948, replacing three blocks that had collectively housed 1,100 residents.

During the 1950s and 1960s, a consortium of civic leaders and others led by John D. Rockefeller III built the Lincoln Center as part of the "Lincoln Square Renewal Project" during urban planner Robert Moses's program of urban renewals. Respected architects were contracted to design the major buildings on the site, and construction started in 1959. Over the next thirty years the previously blighted area around Lincoln Center became a new cultural hub. Over 7,700 residents were displaced during the redevelopment project. The new developments contained 4,400 housing units, of which only a few were allocated to San Juan Hill's former residents. Most of the area's former residents instead moved to Harlem, another predominantly African American neighborhood in Upper Manhattan, as well as the Bronx.

=== Name ===
Lincoln Center was named after Lincoln Square. The reason for naming the area "Lincoln Square" is unknown, however. The name was bestowed on the area in 1906 by the New York City Board of Aldermen, but records give no reason for their choosing that name.

There has long been speculation that the name came from a local landowner, because the square was previously named Lincoln Square. City records from the time show only the names Johannes van Bruch, Thomas Hall, Stephen De Lancey, Jamesa De Lancey, James De Lancey Jr. and John Somerindyck as area property owners.

The area may also have been named as a tribute to U.S. President Abraham Lincoln. One speculation is that references to President Lincoln were omitted from the records because the mayor in 1906 was George B. McClellan Jr., son of General George B. McClellan who was general-in-chief of the Union Army during the American Civil War and a bitter rival of Lincoln.

== Demographics ==
Based on data from the 2010 United States census, the population of Lincoln Square was 61,489, an increase of 6,250 (11.3%) from the 55,239 counted in 2000. Covering an area of 371.00 acres (150.14 ha), the neighborhood had a population density of 165.7 inhabitants per acre (106,000/sq mi; 40,900/km^{2}).

As of the 2010 Census, the racial makeup of the neighborhood was 73.4% (45,103) White, 4.4% (2,710) African American, 0.1% (58) Native American, 11.2% (6,916) Asian, 0.0% (14) Pacific Islander, 0.3% (175) from other races, and 1.9% (1,196) from two or more races. Hispanic or Latino of any race were 8.6% (5,317) of the population.

== Points of interest ==
- 27 West 67th Street Artists' studio cooperative built in 1901, anchor of the West 67th Street Artists' Colony Historic District
- ABC Television Center East studios, and its flagship station WABC-TV
- AMC Lincoln Square 13
- American Folk Art Museum
- Amsterdam Houses, New York City Housing Authority
- Leonard Bernstein Way (West 65th Street between Amsterdam Avenue and Broadway)
- Central Park
- Church of St. Paul the Apostle
- Church of the Good Shepherd (152 West 66th Street)
- Columbus Circle
- Dante Park
- Ethical Culture Fieldston School, Lower School
- Fiorello H. LaGuardia High School of Music & Art and Performing Arts
- First Battery Armory
- Fordham University Lincoln Center campus
- Holy Trinity Lutheran Church
- Peter Jennings Way (W. 66th Street between Columbus Avenue and Central Park West)
- Juilliard School
- Martin Luther King Jr. Educational Campus
- Lincoln Center
- Lincoln Square farmers market (at Richard Tucker Square)
- Lincoln Square Synagogue
- Manhattan New York Temple (The Church of Jesus Christ of Latter-day Saints)
- Merkin Concert Hall
- Museum of Biblical Art (American Bible Society)
- New York Institute of Technology
- New York Society for Ethical Culture
- Powell Memorial Academy (site of)
- Professional Children's School
- Richard Tucker Square
- Sesame Workshop
- West Side YMCA

== Notable residents ==
- Robert Altman (1925–2006), American film director, lived in the Pythian condominiums in Lincoln Square at the time of his death in 2006.
- Lady Gaga (born 1986), American singer and actress, grew up in the Pythian condominiums.
- Lionel Hampton 1908–2002), Jazz vibraphonist and bandleader.
- Barbara Hillary (1931–2019), the first African-American woman to reach both the North Pole and South Pole, was born in San Juan Hill.
- Jerry Nadler (born 1947), U.S. representative

== See also ==
- Lincoln Square Productions
