= Charles Revson =

American-Canadian businessman (1906–1975)

- Born: Charles Haskell Revson; October 11, 1906; Somerville, Massachusetts, U.S.
- Died: August 24, 1975 (aged 68); New Rochelle, New York, U.S.
- Education: Manchester West High School
- Occupations: Businessman, philanthropist
- Known for: Founder of Revlon
- Relatives: Joseph Revson (brother)

Charles Haskell Revson (October 11, 1906 – August 24, 1975) was an American businessman and philanthropist. He was best known as a pioneering figure in the American cosmetics industry as the person who created the first pigment-based nail polish and founded and managed Revlon through five decades.

== Early years ==
Revson was born in Somerville, Massachusetts, after his family immigrated from Canada to the United States. He was raised in Manchester, New Hampshire. His father, Samuel Revson, was born in Lithuania and of Lithuanian-Jewish heritage; his mother, Jeanette Weiss Revson, in Austria-Hungary and of German-Jewish background. His parents emigrated to Boston in the late 19th century where they had eight other children. Jeanette died young of pneumonia in the 1920s. Jeanette's parents, Saul J. and Mary Ella Greenberg Weiss, influenced many of their offspring to pursue success. Many of the Weiss family descendants exhibited qualities such as the perfectionism and aestheticism evident in Charles Revson's career. Revson, like many other Weiss family descendants, disassociated from most of the family of origin to create a fiercely autonomous identity.

Revson's father worked as a cigar roller in Manchester, not far from where the Revsons lived in the Squog Area, a German-American neighborhood that was part of Manchester's "West Side". Revson moved to Boston after graduating from Manchester High School West.

== Founding of Revlon ==
When Elka, the cosmetics company he worked for, did not promote him to the position of national distributor, Revson decided to go into business for himself.

=== Quiz show scandals ===
In the mid-1950s, Revlon sponsored the quiz show The $64,000 Question, which became a television phenomenon and boosted sales considerably. Revson and his brother Martin, second in charge at the company, allegedly demanded that the producers control the questions in order to keep popular contestants winning and maintain the program's high ratings. This sparked what later became known as the quiz show scandal, as The $64,000 Question, The Challenge and Twenty One led to the duplication of the producers' and sponsors' dubious methods to ensure a large viewership.

Steve Carlin, executive producer of Entertainment Productions, Inc., which produced The $64,000 Question and The $64,000 Challenge, was called to testify before Congress about the rigging of the TV quiz shows. He said that Revson demanded the shows be rigged to ensure high ratings. "There is a tradition in television...of trying to please the client," Carlin testified. "We were willing to please the client." Though they testified, neither Charles nor Martin Revson ever became the subjects of an official inquiry. The scandal effectively killed the quiz show phenomenon, but by that time, Revlon had vastly increased its market share and was established as an international behemoth in its niche.

== Personal life ==
Charles Revson was married three times. His first marriage was brief. His second was to Johanna C Ancky Johnson, producing sons John and Charles H. Revson, Jr., and daughter, Penelope. He had 5 grandchildren: Jill Revson, Jennifer Mitchell, Charles Mitchell, Charles H. Revson III and Alexander Revson. He married a third time to Lyn Revson (who in the 1980s was a subject of portraits by Andy Warhol). He also had an affair with actress/singer Eartha Kitt.

His nephew, Peter Revson, a Formula One racecar driver and son of his brother Martin, died in 1974. Peter's younger brother Doug died before him in a racecar accident in Denmark in 1967. Peter was engaged to 1973 Miss World, Marjorie Wallace 14 days before his fatal accident in practice for the 1974 South African Grand Prix.

Revson was a frequent customer of master tailor William Fioravanti at 45 West 57th Street, ordering around a dozen suits a year; Revson later invested in the business.

Revson died on August 24, 1975, at his home in Premium Point, New Rochelle, New York.

== Philanthropy ==
In 1956, Revson established the Charles H. Revson Foundation, which he funded with over $10 million during his lifetime. The foundation funded schools, hospitals, and service organizations serving the Jewish community, mostly located in New York. Upon his death, Revson endowed the foundation with $68 million from his estate and granted the board of directors the discretion to chart the foundation's future course. In 1978, the foundation began a formal grantmaking process, and since that time, it has disbursed a total of $145 million in grants and its endowment has grown from $68 million to $141 million.

== Legacy ==
Revson was a character in the Doug Wright-Scott Frankel-Michael Korie musical War Paint based on Lindy Woodhead's book of the same name and The Powder and the Glory documentary. Erik Liberman played Revson in both the Goodman Theatre and Broadway productions, as well as on the original cast recording, opposite Patti LuPone as Helena Rubinstein and Christine Ebersole as Elizabeth Arden.

Designed by Philip Johnson Associates, Revson Fountain at Lincoln Center was dedicated on April 7, 1964, and was funded by the Revlon Foundation in 1962.
