= Damrosch =

Damrosch is a surname, and may refer to:

- Barbara Damrosch (born 1942), horticulturist, writer, co-owner of the Four Season Farm
- Clara Damrosch (married name Mannes, 1869–1948), German-born American musician, daughter of Leopold
- David Damrosch, American author
- Frank Damrosch (1859–1937), German-born American conductor and music educator, son of Leopold
- Leo Damrosch (born 1941), American scholar and author, professor of literature at Harvard
- Leopold Damrosch (1832–1885), German-born American conductor and composer
- Lori Fisler Damrosch, American legal scholar
- Walter Damrosch (1862–1950), German-born American conductor and composer, son of Leopold
