= Film at Lincoln Center =

Film society in New York City

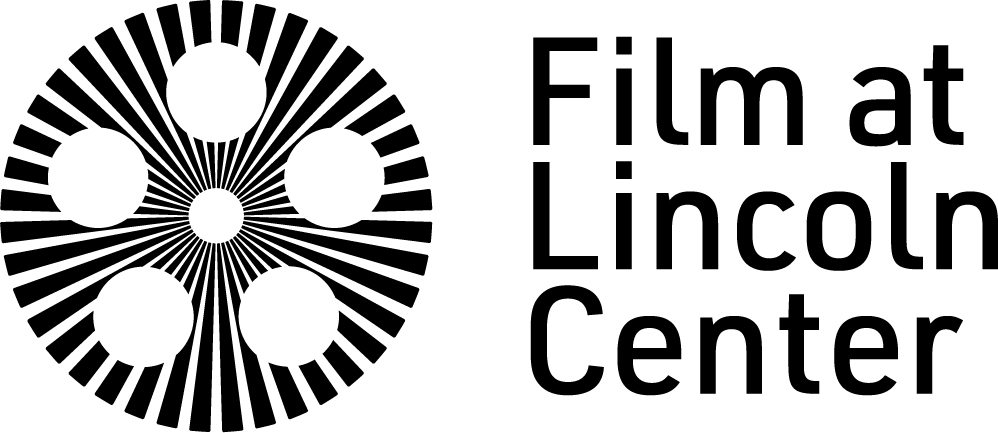

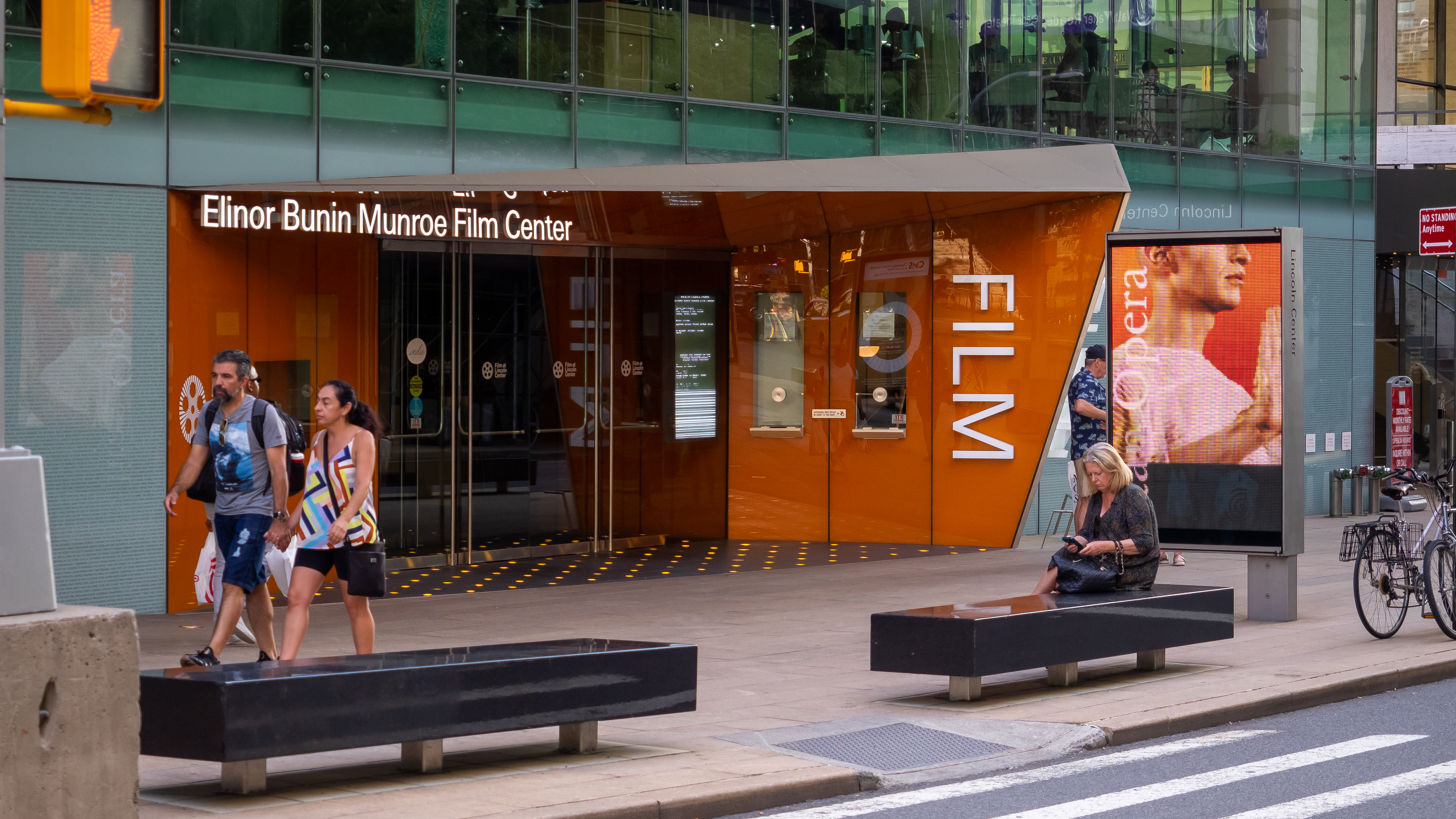
- The Elinor Bunin Munroe Film Center
- Abbreviation: FLC
- Established: 1969; 57 years ago
- Type: Nonprofit organization
- Legal status: Foundation
- Purpose: Film
- Headquarters: Lincoln Center for the Performing Arts
- Publication: Film Comment
- Website: www.filmlinc.org

Film at Lincoln Center (FLC), previously known as the Film Society of Lincoln Center (FSLC) until 2019, is a nonprofit organization based in New York City. Founded in 1969 by three Lincoln Center executives—William F. May, Martin E. Segal and Schuyler G. Chapin—the organization presents film festivals, retrospectives, new releases, restorations, and talks. Film at Lincoln Center is one of the eleven resident organizations at the Lincoln Center for the Performing Arts.

== Beginnings ==
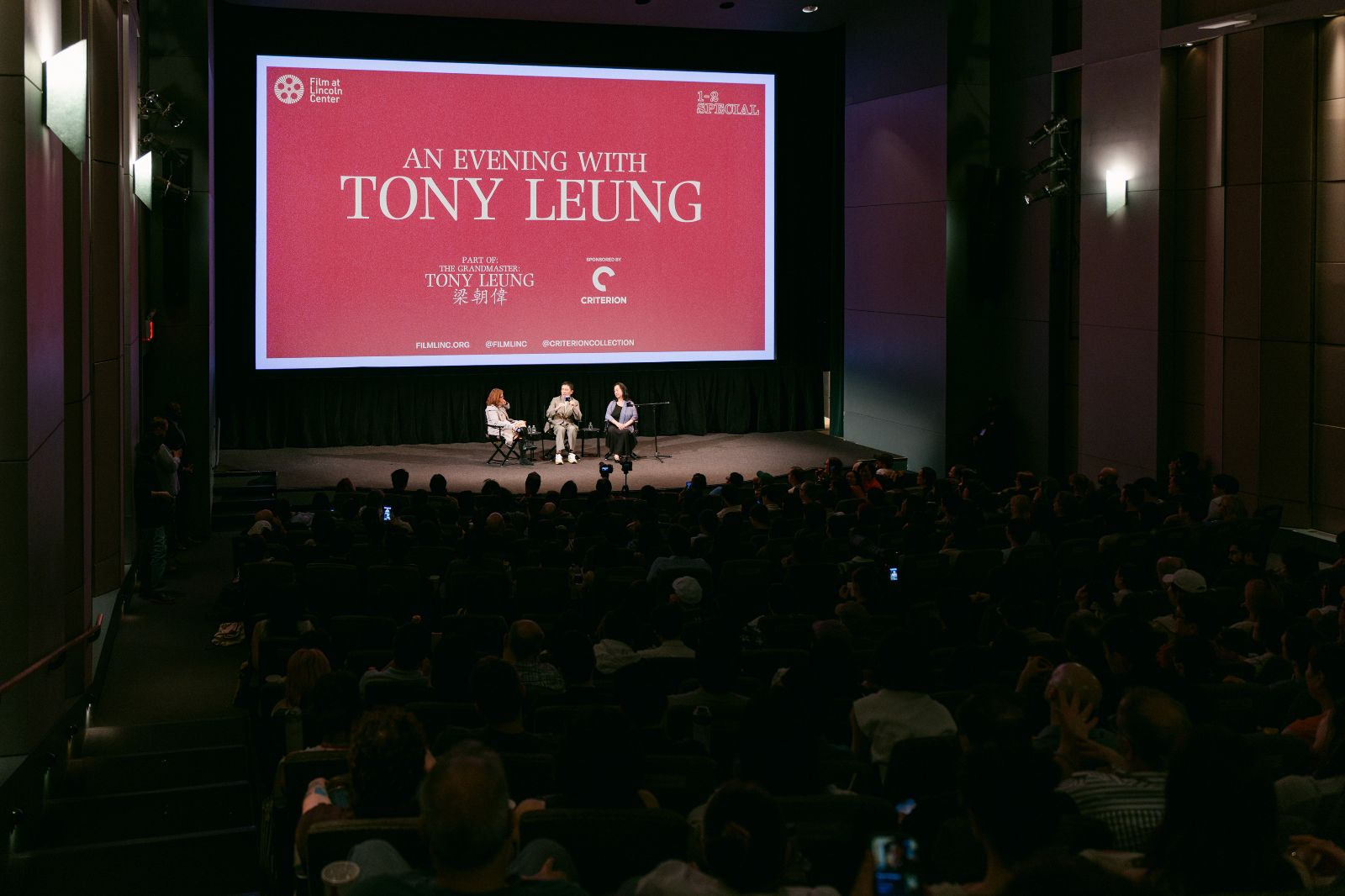
Walter Reade Theater, the largest movie theater at Film at Lincoln Center.

Buildings of Lincoln Center
Buildings and structures in Lincoln Center:
1 Samuel B. and David Rose Building (includes Walter Reade Theater)
2 Juilliard School
3 Alice Tully Hall
4 Vivian Beaumont Theater (includes Mitzi E. Newhouse Theater and Claire Tow Theater)
5 Elinor Bunin Monroe Film Center
6 David Geffen Hall
7 New York Public Library for the Performing Arts (includes Bruno Walter Auditorium)
8 Metropolitan Opera House
9 Josie Robertson Plaza with Revson Fountain
10 Damrosch Park
11 David H. Koch Theater
12 David Rubenstein Atrium
13 Jazz at Lincoln Center

Over the last six decades, Film at Lincoln Center has introduced to American audiences the works of many of the world's most acclaimed filmmakers, including François Truffaut, Rainer Werner Fassbinder, Jean-Luc Godard, Pedro Almodóvar, and Martin Scorsese.

Each year the organization presents its annual Chaplin Award Gala, honoring legendary stars and industry leaders at Lincoln Center's Alice Tully Hall.

Film at Lincoln Center also hosts the annual New York Film Festival and is a co-presenter (with the Museum of Modern Art) of the New Directors/New Films Festival. The organization also publishes the film journal Film Comment.

== Organizers ==
Daniel Battsek is president of Film at Lincoln Center. Past executives include Lesli Klainberg, Rose Kuo, Mara Manus, Claudia Bonn, and Joanne Koch, who served as executive director from 1971 to 2003. Dennis Lim is the artistic director of New York Film Festival.

== Past honorees of Gala Tribute ==
=== 1970s ===
| Year | Honoree | Profession | Presenter (s) | Ref. |
|---|---|---|---|---|
| 1972 | Charlie Chaplin | Filmmaker and comedian | | |
| 1973 | Fred Astaire | Actor and dancer | | |
| 1974 | Alfred Hitchcock | Filmmaker | | |
| 1975 | Joanne Woodward and Paul Newman | Actors | | |
| 1978 | George Cukor | Filmmaker | | |
| 1979 | Bob Hope | Actor and comedian | | |

=== 1980s ===
| Year | Honoree | Profession | Presenter (s) | Ref. |
|---|---|---|---|---|
| 1980 | John Huston | Filmmaker | | |
| 1981 | Barbara Stanwyck | Actress | | |
| 1982 | Billy Wilder | Filmmaker | | |
| 1983 | Laurence Olivier | Filmmaker and actor | | |
| 1984 | Claudette Colbert | Actress | | |
| 1985 | Federico Fellini | Filmmaker | | |
| 1986 | Elizabeth Taylor | Actress | | |
| 1987 | Alec Guinness | Actor | | |
| 1988 | Yves Montand | Actor and singer | | |
| 1989 | Bette Davis | Actress | | |

=== 1990s ===
| Year | Honoree | Profession | Presenter (s) | Ref. |
|---|---|---|---|---|
| 1990 | James Stewart | Actor | | |
| 1991 | Audrey Hepburn | Actress | | |
| 1992 | Gregory Peck | Actor | | |
| 1993 | Jack Lemmon | Actor | | |
| 1994 | Robert Altman | Filmmaker | | |
| 1995 | Shirley MacLaine | Actress | | |
| 1996 | Clint Eastwood | Filmmaker and actor | | |
| 1997 | Sean Connery | Actor | | |
| 1998 | Martin Scorsese | Filmmaker | | |
| 1999 | Mike Nichols | Filmmaker | | |

=== 2000s ===
| Year | Honoree | Profession | Presenter (s) | Ref. |
|---|---|---|---|---|
| 2000 | Al Pacino | Actor | | |
| 2001 | Jane Fonda | Actress | | |
| 2002 | Francis Ford Coppola | Filmmaker | | |
| 2003 | Susan Sarandon | Actress | | |
| 2004 | Michael Caine | Actor | | |
| 2005 | Dustin Hoffman | Actor | | |
| 2006 | Jessica Lange | Actress | | |
| 2007 | Diane Keaton | Actress | | |
| 2008 | Meryl Streep | Actress | | |
| 2009 | Tom Hanks | Actor and producer | | |

=== 2010s ===
| Year | Honoree | Profession | Presenter (s) | Ref. |
|---|---|---|---|---|
| 2010 | Michael Douglas | Actor | | |
| 2011 | Sidney Poitier | Actor | | |
| 2012 | Catherine Deneuve | Actress | | |
| 2013 | Barbra Streisand | Filmmaker and actress | | |
| 2014 | Rob Reiner | Filmmaker | | |
| 2015 | Robert Redford | Filmmaker and actor | | |
| 2016 | Morgan Freeman | Actor | | |
| 2017 | Robert De Niro | Actor | | |
| 2018 | Helen Mirren | Actress | | |
| 2019 | 50th Anniversary Gala | | | |

=== 2020s ===
| Year | Honoree | Profession | Presenter (s) | Ref. |
|---|---|---|---|---|
| 2020 | Not awarded due to COVID-19 | | | |
| 2021 | Spike Lee | Filmmaker | | |
| 2022 | Cate Blanchett | Actress | Todd Haynes and Bradley Cooper were set to present but had to back out due to both contracting COVID-19 | |
| 2023 | Viola Davis | Actress | Steve McQueen presented the award with Meryl Streep and Jessica Chastain honoring Davis | |
| 2024 | Jeff Bridges | Actor | Sharon Stone presented the award with Chris Pine, Cynthia Erivo, and Rosie Perez honoring Bridges | |
| 2025 | Pedro Almodóvar | Filmmaker | | |
| 2026 | George Clooney | Filmmaker and actor | | |
