= Somerindyck House =

Building in New York City (demolished 1868)

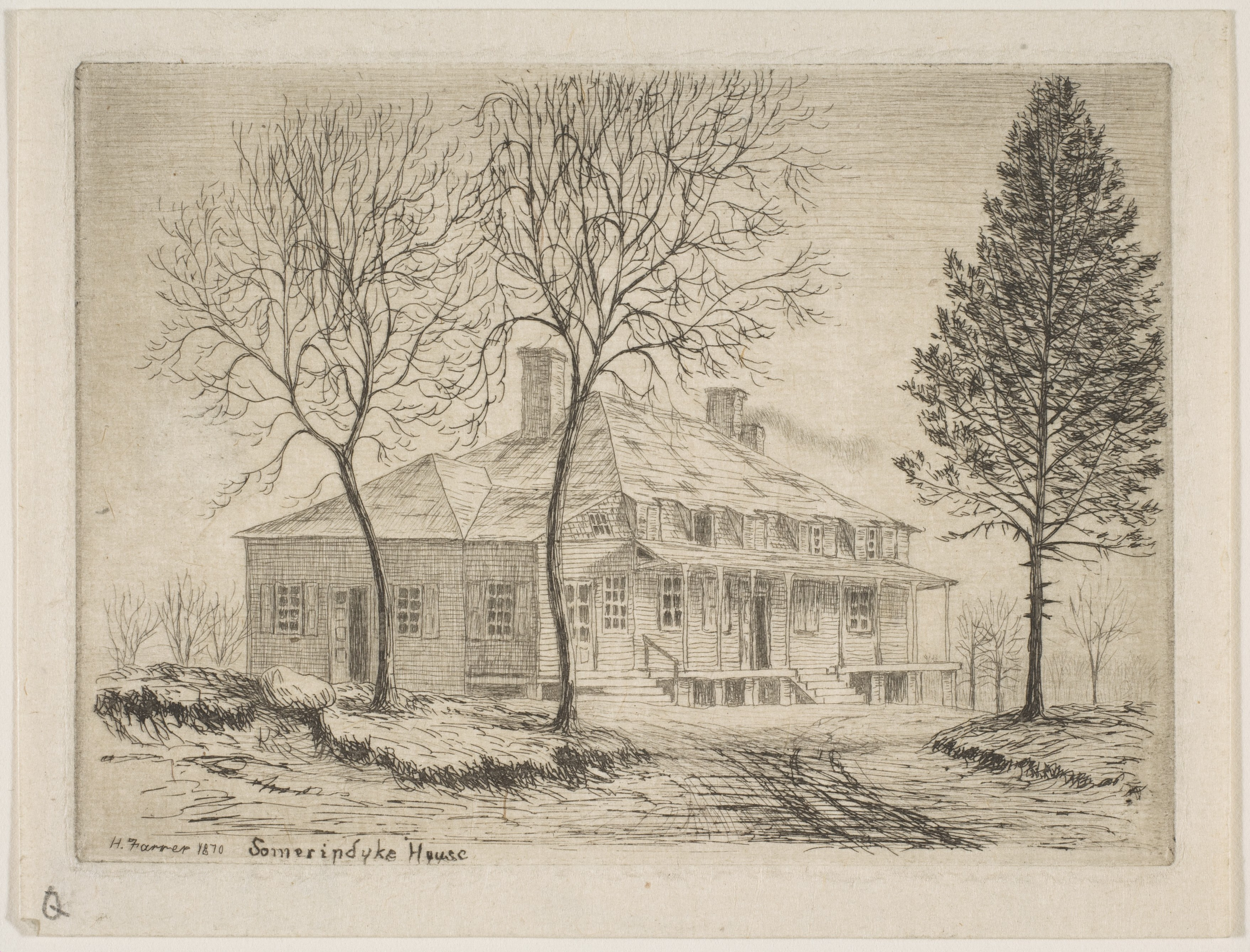
- 1870 etching print by Henry Farrer
- Interactive map of the Somerindyck House area

General information
- Location: Bloomingdale Road, Manhattan, New York City, U.S.
- Coordinates: 40.7812°N 73.9815°W
- Demolished: 1868

The Somerindyck House was a house in Manhattan, New York City, U.S.. It was located on Bloomingdale Road (now Broadway), above West 75th Street. While visiting the United States, Louis Philippe I taught in the house; he later served as the King of France.

Henry Farrer's 1870 etching of the house is in the collection of the Metropolitan Museum of Art.

The house stood until 1868 when Bloomingdale Road was widened.
