= Play the Blues: Live from Jazz at Lincoln Center =

Play the Blues

Live album from Jazz at Lincoln Center by Wynton Marsalis and Eric Clapton
- Released: September 13, 2011
- Recorded: April 7–9, 2011
- Venues: Lincoln Center, NYC
- Genre: Blues · jazz · jump blues · Dixieland jazz
- Length: 74:37
- Label: Reprise

Wynton Marsalis chronology
| Here We Go Again (2011) | Play the Blues (2011) | Live in Cuba (2015) |

Eric Clapton chronology
| Clapton (2010) | Play the Blues (2011) | Old Sock (2013) |

Professional ratings
Review scores
| Source | Rating |
|---|---|
| AllMusic | 4 Stars |
| The New York Times | Mixed |

Play the Blues: Live from Jazz at Lincoln Center is a 2011 live album by Eric Clapton and Wynton Marsalis. Released on September 13, it contains live recordings of the 2011 collaboration at the Lincoln Center for the Performing Arts between the British blues guitarist and the American jazz trumpeter. A video release accompanies the audio recordings. The live album reached various national charts and was certified in several territories.

== Track listing ==
=== CD ===
1. "Ice Cream" – 7:38
2. "Forty-Four" – 7:13
3. "Joe Turner's Blues" – 7:48
4. "The Last Time" – 4:18
5. "Careless Love" – 7:43
6. "Kidman Blues" – 4:21
7. "Layla" – 9:09
8. "Joliet Bound" – 3:50
9. "Just A Closer Walk With Thee" – 12:20
10. "Corrine, Corrina" – 10:22

=== DVD-Video ===
1. "Ice Cream"
2. "Forty-Four"
3. "Joe Turner's Blues"
4. "The Last Time"
5. "Careless Love"
6. "Kidman Blues"
7. "Layla"
8. "Joliet Bound"
9. "Just A Closer Walk With Thee"
10. "Corrine, Corrina"
11. "Stagger Lee" - Taj Mahal

== Chart performance ==
In the United Kingdom, Play the Blues: Live from Jazz at Lincoln Center reached position 40 on the official album charts, which contains the summary of digital downloads and physical album sales. In addition, the release positioned itself on number 91 on the download album chart and peaked at number 34 on the physical album sales chart. In the United States, the collaboration effort peaked at number 31 on Billboard magazine's Top 200 album chart, selling more than 18,000 copies in the first week. While on the American album chart in 2011, the album sold 40,000 copies in total. Play the Blues: Live from Jazz at Lincoln Center also reached number one on the Blues albums sales chart, which is also compiled by the Billboard magazine. In New Zealand, the live album reached number 40 on the Recorded Music NZ chart. The release was awarded with several certification awards worldwide, gaining gold presentations for outstanding album sales in Brazil, Spain and Sweden, and becoming a platinum album in Croatia, Germany and Poland with a double platinum sales award. For the video release, Play the Blues: Live from Jazz at Lincoln Center was certified with a platinum presentation award record breaking sales in Brazil, Macao and Portugal.

== Personnel ==
- Eric Clapton – vocals, guitar
- Wynton Marsalis – trumpet
- Don Vappie – banjo, guitar
- Taj Mahal – vocals, guitar
- Dan Nimmer – piano
- Chris Stainton – keyboards
- Carlos Henriquez – bass
- Ali Jackson – drums, tambourine
- Marcus Printup – trumpet
- Victor Goines – tenor sax, soprano sax, clarinet, bass clarinet
- Chris Crenshaw – trombone, vocals on "Joliet Bound"

== Chart positions ==
=== Weekly charts ===
| Chart (2011–2014) | Peak position |
|---|---|
| Australian Music DVD (ARIA) | 4 |
| Austrian Albums (Ö3 Austria) | 11 |
| Belgian Albums (Ultratop Flanders) | 31 |
| Belgian Albums (Ultratop Wallonia) | 35 |
| Croatian International Albums (HDU) | 7 |
| Czech Albums (ČNS IFPI) | 8 |
| Dutch Albums (Album Top 100) | 21 |
| Dutch Music DVD (MegaCharts) | 28 |
| Finnish Albums (Suomen virallinen lista) | 33 |
| French Albums (SNEP) | 100 |
| German Albums (Offizielle Top 100) | 8 |
| Italian Albums (FIMI) | 15 |
| Japanese Albums (Oricon) | 16 |
| Mexican Albums (Top 100 Mexico) | 32 |
| New Zealand Albums (RMNZ) | 40 |
| Norwegian Albums (VG-lista) | 13 |
| Polish Albums (ZPAV) | 10 |
| Portuguese Albums (AFP) | 9 |
| Portuguese Music DVD (AFP) | 3 |
| Scottish Albums (Official Charts) | 48 |
| Spanish Albums (Promusicae) | 12 |
| Swedish Albums (Sverigetopplistan) | 51 |
| Swiss Albums (Schweizer Hitparade) | 18 |
| UK Album Downloads (OCC) | 91 |
| UK Albums (Official Charts) | 40 |
| UK Jazz & Blues Albums (Official Charts) | 2 |
| UK Physical Albums (OCC) | 34 |
| US Billboard 200 | 31 |
| US Top Rock Albums (Billboard) | 12 |
| US Top Blues Albums (Billboard) | 1 |

== Certifications ==
=== Album ===
| Region | Certification | Certified units/sales |
|---|---|---|
| Argentina (CAPIF) | Platinum | 40,000^{^} |
| Brazil (Pro-Música Brasil) | Gold | 20,000^{*} |
| Croatia (HDU) | Platinum | |
| Germany (BVMI) | 3× Gold | 30,000^{‡} |
| Poland (ZPAV) | 2× Platinum | 40,000^{*} |
| Spain (Promusicae) | Gold | 30,000^{^} |
| Sweden (GLF) | Gold | 20,000^{‡} |
^{*} Sales figures based on certification alone.^{^} Shipments figures based on certification alone.^{‡} Sales+streaming figures based on certification alone.

=== Video ===
| Region | Certification | Certified units/sales |
|---|---|---|
| Brazil (Pro-Música Brasil) | Platinum | 30,000^{*} |
| Portugal (AFP) | Platinum | 8,000^{^} |
^{*} Sales figures based on certification alone.^{^} Shipments figures based on certification alone.
