= Dizzy con Clave =

Live album by Carlos Henriquez
- Released: 2018
- Recorded: December 28 & 29, 2017
- Venues: Dizzy's Club, Jazz at Lincoln Center, NYC
- Genre: Latin Jazz
- Length: 74:00
- Labels: RodBros; 1002 CD

Carlos Henriquez chronology
The Bronx Pyramid (2015)	Dizzy con Clave (2018)	The South Bronx Story (2022)

Dizzy con Clave (subtitled Live from Dizzy's Club Coca-Cola) is a live octet album by Puerto Rican bassist Carlos Henriquez, released by RodBros Music in 2018. It was recorded on December 28 and 29, 2017, at Dizzy's Club at Jazz at Lincoln Center to celebrate the centennial of trumpeter Dizzy Gillespie.

== Reception ==
Professional ratings
Review scores
Source	Rating
All About Jazz (Dan Bilawsky)	4.5/5 stars
All About Jazz (Angelo Leonardi)	3.5/5 stars
Audiophile Audition	4/5 stars
Jazzwise	4/5 stars

All About Jazz's Dan Bilawsky wrote, "His takes on this material remain respectful and faithful to a point, embracing the melodic, harmonic, and rhythmic touchstones that defined Gillespie's originals. But they also stretch that music in surprising ways, expanding on the originals and appending various points and forms to the structures". Angelo Leonardi of the same publication called the album "compelling" with "imaginative solos and dazzling arrangements".

Audiophile Audition stated, "This is a supercharged group of musicians that Henriquez has assembled for this concert and it is demonstrated in the deference and transformation that the band devotes to the music."

DownBeat described it as an "inventive tribute to ... Dizzy Gillespie", with "Gilkes, Aldana and Valera provid[ing] outstanding solos in the set, while trumpeters Stafford and Rodriguez offer personal homage to Gillespie with their stratospheric blowing."

Jazzwise's Jane Cornwell wrote, "It sees an all-star octet refreshing the likes of 'A Night in Tunisia' and 'Tin Tin Deo', while reminding us of Gillespie's genius and showcasing the beauty in audacity, and respect in artistic license. Henriquez stays true to the 2/3, 3/2 clave beat so essential to Afro-Cuban music – hence the album's title – but adds his own spin, with 'Groovin' High' moving from a slow danzon into a quirky mambo, 'Manteca' mixing salsa and latin jazz and voices add another dimension. Oh, and Michael Rodriguez shines on trumpet. Exhilarating fare."

Raul Da Gama for Latin Jazz Network noted, "each of these young players here bring particularly strong individual voices to this music."

WRTI's review commented, "the sound is fresh, without being unconventional. Listening to this will make you jealous of everyone who was able to attend the live recording at Dizzy's."

== Track listing ==
All tracks are written by Dizzy Gillespie except where noted.

No.	Title	Writer(s)	Length
1.	"A Night in Tunisia"		8:47
2.	"Groovin' High"		7:16
3.	"Bebop"		6:54
4.	"Guarachi Guaro"	Gillespie; Chano Pozo	9:28
5.	"Con Alma"		7:10
6.	"Manteca"	Gillespie; Pozo; Gil Fuller	8:42
7.	"Kush"		8:20
8.	"Tin Tin Deo"	Gillespie; Pozo; Fuller	9:22
9.	"Trinidad, Goodbye"	Kenny Barron	8:01
Total length:			74:00

== Personnel ==
- Carlos Henriquez – double bass, coro
- Melissa Aldana – tenor saxophone
- Terell Stafford – trumpet
- Michael Rodriguez – trumpet, coro
- Marshall Gilkes – trombone, coro
- Manuel Valera – piano
- Anthony Almonte – congas, vocals
- Obed Calvaire – drums
