= Ryan Kisor =

American jazz trumpeter (born 1973)

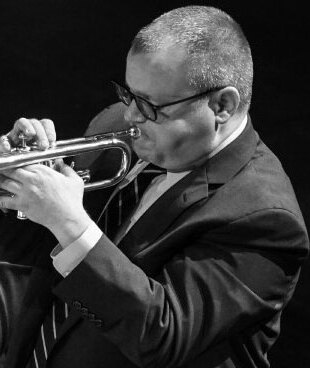
- Kisor in 2020

Background information
- Born: April 12, 1973 (age 53); Chicago, Illinois, United States
- Genre: Neo-bop jazz
- Occupation: Musician
- Instrument: Trumpet
- Years active: 1983–present
- Label: Columbia Records

Ryan Kisor (born April 12, 1973) is an American jazz trumpeter.

A native of Sioux City, Iowa, Kisor learned trumpet from his father, Larry Kisor, and started playing in a local dance band (the Eddie Skeets Orchestra) at age ten. Kisor began classical trumpet lessons at age 12, met Clark Terry when he was 15 (attending his summer jazz camp), and played with all-star high school bands. In 1990, Kisor won the Thelonious Monk Institute's trumpet contest at the age of 17; Nicholas Payton and Marcus Printup were among the other contestants that year. His younger brother Justin Kisor is also an accomplished jazz artist (trumpet) who he has performed numerous concerts and had record releases with Kisor.

Following this he was signed by Columbia Records, who released his first two albums, 1992's Minor Mutiny and 1993's On the One. Following this, Kisor entered the Manhattan School of Music, where he was a student of Lew Soloff among others. He has played in New York with the Mingus Big Band and the Michel Camilo Big Band, with Gerry Mulligan, Wynton Marsalis, Wycliffe Gordon, Horace Silver and Walter Blanding. Since 1994 he has been a member of the Jazz at Lincoln Center Orchestra, and has released many albums as a bandleader.

== Discography ==
=== As leader/co-leader ===
- 1992?: Minor Mutiny (Columbia, 1992)
- 1993?: On the One (Columbia, 1993)
- 1997: Battle Cry (Criss Cross Jazz, 1998)
- 1998: The Usual Suspects (Fable/Lightyear, 1998)
- 1998: Point of Arrival (Criss Cross Jazz, 2000)
- 1999: Power Source (Criss Cross Jazz, 2001)
- 1999: Kisor (Videoarts Music, 2000)
- 2000: Kisor II (Videoarts Music, 2001)
- 2001: The Dream (Criss Cross Jazz, 2001)
- 2002: The Sidewinder (Videoarts Music, 2003)
- 2002: Awakening (Criss Cross Jazz, 2003)
- 2003: Donna Lee (Videoarts Music, 2004)
- 2004: The Uptown Quintet, Live in New York (Cellar Live, 2005) – live recorded at Smoke (jazz club)
- 2005: Ryan Kisor Quintet, This Is Ryan (Videoarts Music, 2005)
- 2006: Jam Session Volume 25 with Marcus Printup, Joe Magnarelli (SteepleChase, 2008)
- 2006: One Finger Snap (Videoarts Music, 2006)
- 2007: Conception: Cool and Hot (Birds, 2008)
- 2008: Ryan Kisor Quintet, Live at Smalls (SmallsLIVE, 2010) – live recorded at Smalls Jazz Club

=== As a member ===
The Jazz at Lincoln Center Orchestra (1994– )

- Blood on the Fields (Columbia, 1997) – rec. 1995
- Live in Swing City, Swingin' with Duke (Columbia, 1999) – live rec. 1998
- Big Train (Columbia, 1999) – rec. 1998
- Essentially Ellington 2000 (Warner Bros., 2000) – rec. 1999
- Plays the Music of Duke Ellington (Brooks Brothers, 2004) – rec. 1999–2003
- A Love Supreme (Palmetto, 2004)
- Don't Be Afraid...The Music of Charles Mingus (Palmetto, 2005)
- Vitoria Suite (EmArcy, 2010)
- Portrait in Seven Shades (Jazz at Lincoln Center, 2010)
- The Abyssinian Mass (Blue Engine, 2016)
- The Music of John Lewis (Blue Engine, 2017)
- The Music of Wayne Shorter (Blue Engine, 2020)

The Manhattan Jazz Orchestra

- Les Liaisons Dangereuses (Sweet Basil, 1992)
- A Night in Tunisia (Sweet Basil, 1993)
- Get It On (Sweet Basil, 1995)
- Paint It Black (Sweet Basil, 1996)
- Black Magic Woman (Sweet Basil, 1997)
- Hey Duke! (Videoarts Music, 1999)
- Some Skunk Funk (Videoarts Music, 2002)
- Birdland (Videoarts Music, 2004)

Mingus Big Band

- Nostalgia in Times Square (Dreyfus, 1993)
- Gunslinging Birds (Dreyfus, 1995)
- Live in Time (Dreyfus, 1996) – live
- Que Viva Mingus! (Dreyfus, 1997)

Carnegie Hall Jazz Band

- The Carnegie Hall Jazz Band/Music Director Jon Faddis (Blue Note, 1996)

=== As sideman ===
With David Matthews

- Watermelon Man (Sweet Basil, 1997)
- Furuhata Jazz in N.Y. (WEA, 1997)
- Mambo No. 5 (Sweet Basil, 1998)
- Back to Bach (Milestone, 2000)
- The Girl from Ipanema (Videoarts Music, 2002) – rec. 2001
- Impressions (Videoarts Music, 2002) – rec. 2001

With others

- Ray Anderson, Big Band Record (Gramavision, 1994)
- Ehud Asherie, Lockout (Posi-Tone, 2007)
- Ralph Bowen, Keep the Change (Criss Cross Jazz, 2004)
- Michel Camilo, One More Once (Columbia, 1994)
- Jesse Davis, Live at Smalls (SmallsLIVE, 2012) – live
- Michael Davis, Trumpets Eleven (Hip-Bone Music, 2003)
- Ivan Farmakovsky, Next to the Shadow (Boheme Music, 2009)
- Wycliffe Gordon, What You Dealin' With (Criss Cross Jazz, 2001)
- Jim Hall, Textures (Telarc, 1997)
- Ian Hendrickson-Smith, Still Smokin' (Sharp Nine, 2004)
- Mike LeDonne, Soulmates (Criss Cross Jazz, 1993)
- Mike Longo, Explosion (Consolidated Artists, 1999)
- Andy McKee, Sound Roots (Mapleshade, 1997)
- Pat Metheny, Secret Story (Geffen, 1992)
- Gerry Mulligan, Dragonfly (Telarc, 1995)
- Ted Nash, Presidential Suite: Eight Variations On Freedom (Motema, 2016)
- Melvin Rhyne, Stick to the Kick (Criss Cross Jazz, 1995)
- Herlin Riley, Watch What You're Doing (Criss Cross Jazz, 1999)
- Horace Silver, Jazz... Has... A Sense of Humor (Verve, 1999)
- Steve Slagle, Alto Blue (SteepleChase, 1997)
- Grant Stewart, Tenor and Soul (Videoarts Music, 2005)
- Steve Swallow, Deconstructed (XtraWATT, 1997)
- Bobby Watson, Tailor Made (Columbia, 1993)
- Michael Weiss, Soul Journey (Sintra, 2003)
- Paula West, Come What May (Hi Horse, 2001)
- Ben Wolfe, Live at Smalls (SmallsLIVE, 2010) – live
- Sam Yahel, Searchin' (Naxos, 1997)
