= Jerry Wright =

Jerry Wright may refer to:

- Jerry Wright at Heart Kent
- Jerry Wright (ice hockey), Canadian ice hockey player chosen in 1969 NHL Amateur Draft#Round five

== See also ==
- Jeremy Wright (disambiguation)
- Gerry Wright (disambiguation)
- Gerard Wright
- Gerald Wright (disambiguation)
- Jeremiah Wright, pastor
