= Gerry Wright (disambiguation) =

Gerry Wright is a Canadian antibiotic researcher.

Gerry Wright may also refer to:

- Gerry Wright (basketball) in 1987–88 Detroit Pistons season
- Gerry Wright, Edmonton city councillor, predecessor of Lance White

== See also ==
- Jerry Wright (disambiguation)
- Jeremy Wright (disambiguation)
- Gerald Wright (disambiguation)
- Gary Wright
