= Carlos Henriquez (musician) =

American jazz bassist of Puerto Rican descent (born 1979)

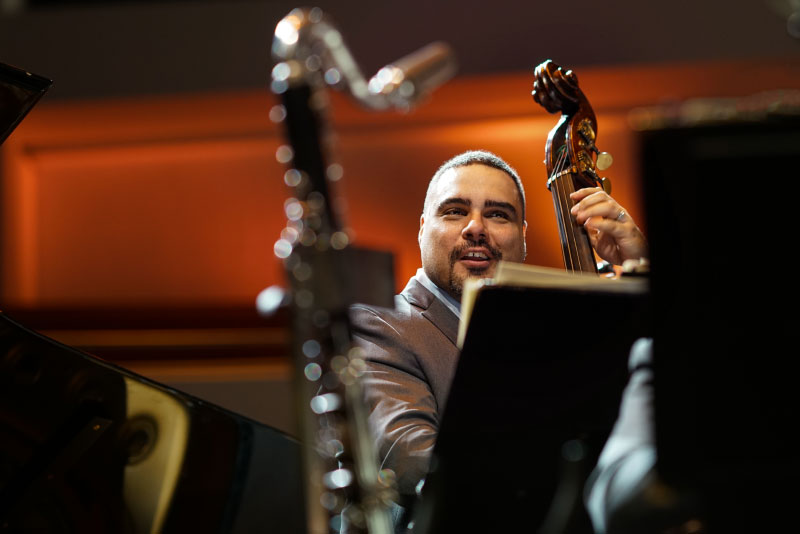
- Henriquez in Denmark, 2020

Background information
- Born: 1979 (age 46–47); The Bronx, New York, U.S.
- Genres: Jazz; Latin jazz; Afro-Cuban jazz
- Occupations: Musician; composer
- Instrument: Double bass
- Years active: 1998–present
- Member of: Jazz at Lincoln Center Orchestra
- Website: www.carloshenriquezmusic.com

Carlos Henriquez (born 1979) is an American jazz double bassist and composer of Puerto Rican descent. Since 1998, he has been a member of the Jazz at Lincoln Center Orchestra.

== Early life ==
Henriquez was born in the Bronx, New York, in 1979, the son of New York Puerto Ricans Jorge and Nilda Henriquez. His father worked at a V.A. hospital (a Vietnam War veteran, himself) and played the trombone, his mother was a dancer, and he has a brother, Jose, who is a few years older than him. Growing up in South Bronx, he began studying music at a young age, first playing the piano, then clarinet, and next, classical guitar through junior high school. As a student of the Juilliard School's Music Advancement Program, under the Tito Puente scholarship, he took up playing the double bass. He received his first bass from church while working with his mentor, Victor Venegas. Henriquez also studied the bass with Joe Santiago, who had played alongside Machito, and with for fifteen years, New York Philharmonic bassist John Schaeffer.

Some of his first interactions with jazz came as a kid, when "the Jazzmobile used to come to St. Mary's Park across the street from the Betances Houses [on 146th Street and Brooke Avenue in Mott Haven], where I grew up ... I remember Clark Terry and David Murray played, and also Tito Puente, Eddie Palmieri, Larry Harlow," he stated in an interview with the New York Times. His interest in music was fostered by neighborhood block parties and festivals, his church band, and parental support, where he absorbed Latin music; his father encouraged his music, giving him cassette tapes of Bill Evans and bassists Eddie Gómez and Paul Chambers. He enrolled in the Fiorello H. LaGuardia High School and was a member of the school's concert jazz ensemble which with, in 1996, won first place in Jazz at Lincoln Center's Essentially Ellington competition and second place the following year.

== Career ==
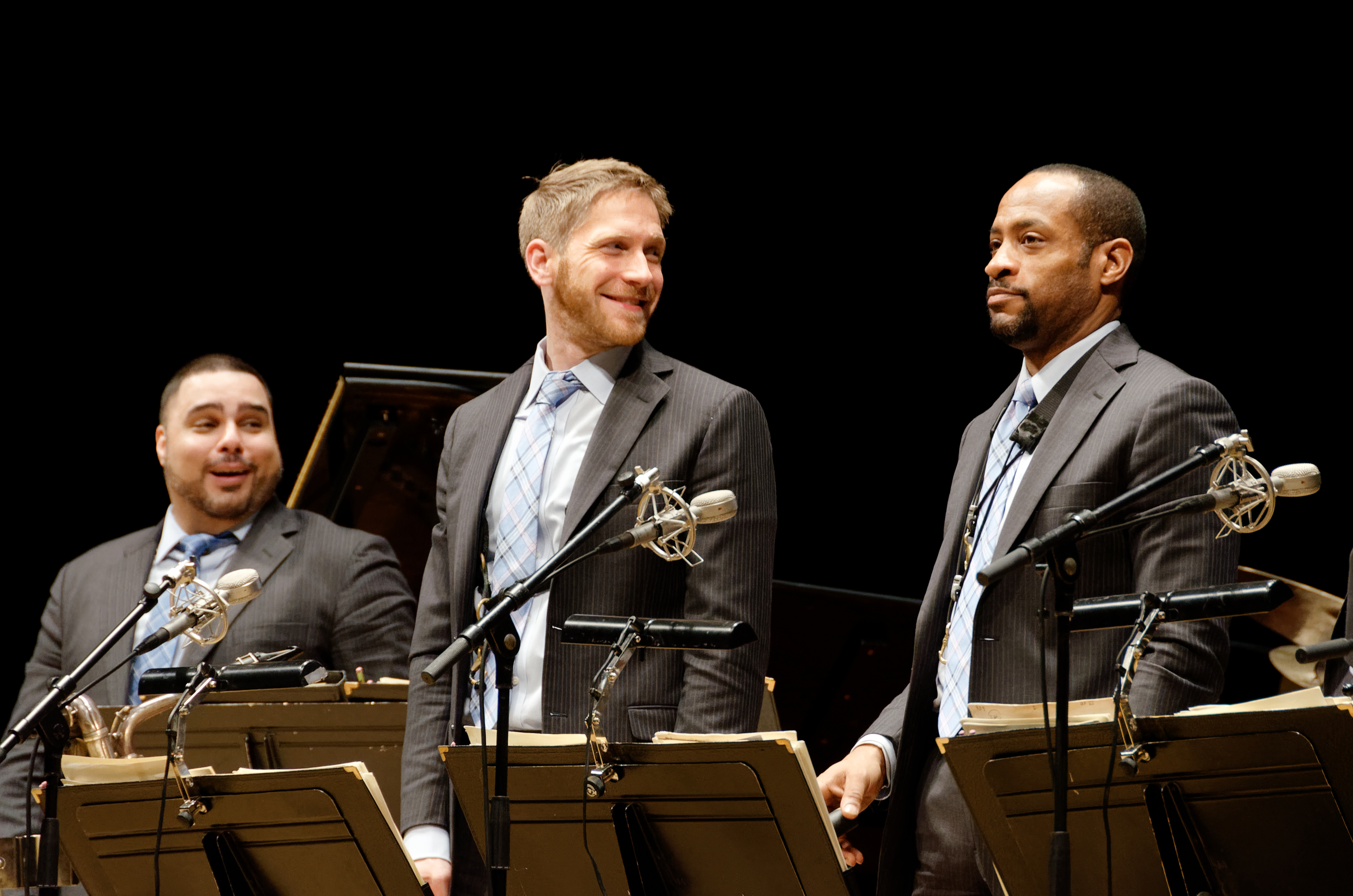
From left: Henriquez with Paul Nedzela and Walter Blanding of the Jazz at Lincoln Center Orchestra, Lyon, 2016

Henriquez's professional career began at age 14, when he played in jazz clubs with his brother, Jose. He first performed out-of-state with Puerto Rican percussionist Johnny Ray.

Shortly after high school graduation in 1998, aged 19, he joined Wynton Marsalis's septet and the Jazz at Lincoln Center Orchestra, which was led by Marsalis. That year, he toured with the band during its summer tour through the U.S., Canada, and Japan, visiting 20 cities, and the autumn world tour, traveling to 33 cities in Europe, South America, and the U.S. He has said about his involvement in the group, "My participation there has been basically my whole life. It's my home and a place where I'm gonna continue to develop and to lead."

In 2010, with Chucho Valdés, he served as music director of the Jazz at Lincoln Center Orchestra's cultural exchange with the Cuban Institute of Music. Since then, he has been largely involved with the band's Latin jazz programming, including leading a 2014 project with singer Rubén Blades (yielding the live album Una Noche con Rubén Blades), a Latin spin on the music of Dizzy Gillespie, and a tribute to Thelonious Monk titled "Monk con Clave".

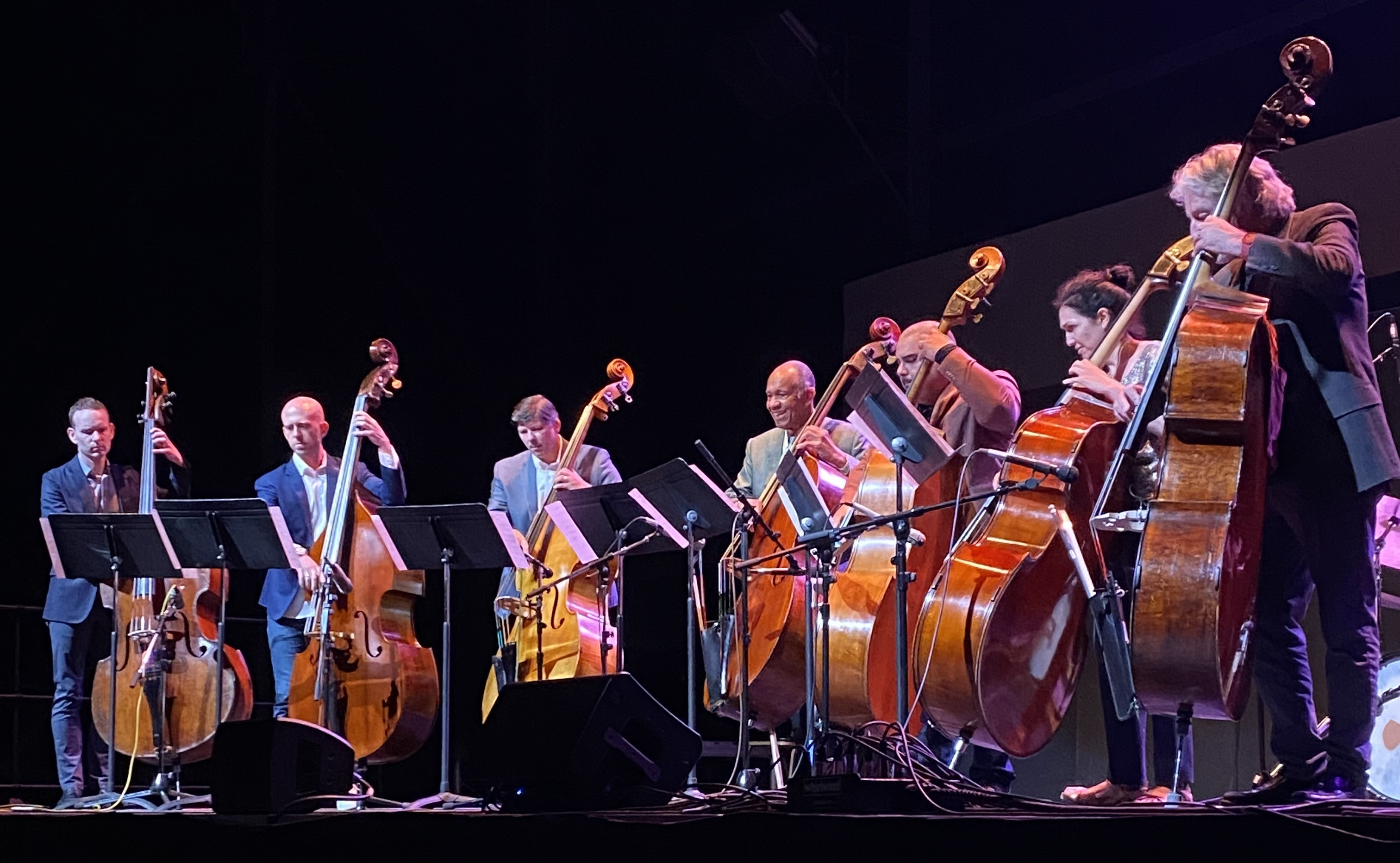
Henriquez (third from right) performing in a bass septet at Centrum's Jazz Port Townsend festival, a tribute to outgoing program director John Clayton (center), 2024

Henriquez has performed with musicians including Marc Anthony, George Benson, Celia Cruz, Bob Dylan, Lenny Kravitz, Paco de Lucía, the Marsalis family, Willie Nelson, Eddie Palmieri, Tito Puente, Carlos Santana, Steve Turre, Chucho Valdés, and Stevie Wonder, among others. Since 2008, he has taught as faculty at the Bienen School of Music at Northwestern University.

About playing the bass, Henriquez has said, "I've always visualized the bass as the catcher of a baseball team — we see everything, the whole game ... That catcher is dealing with everything that's coming in and calling the plays. We, the bass players, can really determine where the music is going to, where the concept is going." He was noted as a "wildly imaginative composer and player" by The New York Times.

== Personal life ==
Henriquez is married and has three children, all boys: Carlos Jr., Alex, and Joshua. He currently resides in West Orange, New Jersey.

== Awards and honors ==
He has received three Grammy Award nominations, each in the category of Best Latin Jazz Album: the Gonzalo Rubalcaba Trio's Supernova in 2002, the Rodriguez Brothers' Impromptu in 2016, and The South Bronx Story in 2022.

== Discography ==
=== As leader ===
- The Bronx Pyramid (Blue Engine, 2015)
- Dizzy con Clave (RodBros, 2018)
- The South Bronx Story (self-released, 2022)
- A Nuyorican Tale (self-released, 2023)
- Monk con Clave (self-released, 2026)
