= Todd Stoll =

American jazz educator, arts administrator, trumpeter and conductor

- Born: Todd Alan Stoll
- Genres: Mainstream jazz, swing, blues
- Occupations: Musician, educator
- Instrument: Trumpet
- Member of: Jazz at Lincoln Center

Todd Alan Stoll is an American arts administrator, jazz trumpeter, conductor, educator, and advocate for jazz and music education. He has served as vice president of education at Jazz at Lincoln Center since 2011, where he oversees educational and community-engagement programs.

Before joining Jazz at Lincoln Center, Stoll spent two decades as a music educator and bandleader in Ohio and founded the Columbus Youth Jazz Orchestra. He later served as president of the Jazz Education Network from 2018 to 2020.

== Early life and education ==
Stoll grew up in Springfield, Ohio. He earned a Bachelor of Music degree in music education from Miami University and a Master of Music degree in trumpet from the University of Cincinnati College-Conservatory of Music.

== Career in Ohio ==
Stoll worked as a music educator and administrator in central Ohio, including as music curriculum coordinator for Westerville City Schools. In 1991, he founded the Columbus Youth Jazz Orchestra, which he directed for approximately 20 years. Under his direction, the ensemble released six recordings, toured internationally, and was selected as a finalist in Jazz at Lincoln Center's Essentially Ellington program.

Pianist Aaron Diehl, who performed in the Columbus Youth Jazz Orchestra while in high school, later credited the ensemble and Stoll with helping develop his interest in jazz. In an interview, Diehl said that Stoll had a particular ability to nurture students who showed a strong desire to learn the music.

In addition to his educational work, Stoll performed as a trumpeter, conducted jazz ensembles, and worked in artist and concert production.

== Jazz at Lincoln Center ==
Stoll joined Jazz at Lincoln Center in 2011 as vice president of education. DownBeat reported in 2022 that he had overseen substantial expansion of the organization's jazz education activities and described its educational work as encompassing programs for participants ranging from infants to college students and adults.

His responsibilities have included programs such as Essentially Ellington High School Jazz Band Competition and Festival, Jazz for Young People, WeBop, Let Freedom Swing, Summer Jazz Academy, and the Jack Rudin Jazz Championship.

Stoll has also been involved in developing digital jazz-education resources. Jazz at Lincoln Center's online programs have included Jazz Academy, instructional video resources, and other digital initiatives intended to reach students and educators outside New York City.

In a 2022 profile, DownBeat reported that Essentially Ellington was reaching more than 7,000 schools in 55 countries and that Let Freedom Swing, a program connecting jazz with American history and civil-rights education, had reached nearly half a million students through approximately 3,000 performances.

Stoll has described performance, education, and advocacy as interconnected parts of Jazz at Lincoln Center's educational mission, with an emphasis on jazz history, community, and expanding access to the music.

== Essentially Ellington ==
Stoll's association with Essentially Ellington predates his employment at Jazz at Lincoln Center. He participated in the program as a school band director before later helping oversee it as part of his responsibilities at the organization.

The program provides participating schools with access to scores, educational materials, festivals, and instruction by professional jazz musicians. Forbes described the 2023 national competition as bringing 15 finalist ensembles to Jazz at Lincoln Center and noted that participating schools receive free sheet music, educational resources, and instruction.

The competition expanded for its 30th anniversary in 2025, when Jazz at Lincoln Center doubled the number of finalist bands from 15 to 30 and expanded the event to five days.

Stoll has frequently discussed the role of Duke Ellington's music in jazz education and the program's emphasis on teaching historically significant repertoire.

== Professional and organizational leadership ==
Stoll served as president-elect of the Jazz Education Network from 2016 to 2018, president from 2018 to 2020, and immediate past president from 2020 to 2022. He subsequently continued to serve on the organization's board of directors.

He has also held leadership and advisory roles with music-education organizations, including the National Association for Music Education and Miami University's College of Creative Arts.

== Performance and conducting ==
Stoll has remained active as a trumpeter, conductor, bandleader, and clinician alongside his administrative work.

In 2019, the Springfield Symphony Orchestra established the Springfield Symphony Jazz Orchestra under Stoll's direction. The ensemble presents professional jazz programming in Springfield, Ohio.

The Springfield Symphony identifies Stoll as the director of the ensemble and notes that he has conducted all-state ensembles and the National Association for Music Education All-National Honors Jazz Ensemble, as well as working as a clinician in the United States and abroad.

== Writing and advocacy ==
Stoll has written about music education, jazz history, and the role of jazz in American culture. In a 2016 essay for Time, he discussed changes in American music education following passage of the Every Student Succeeds Act and argued for a broader role for arts education in schools.

In a 2025 opinion essay for Newsweek, Stoll wrote about the continuing relevance of teaching Duke Ellington and argued for using Ellington's music as a means of examining American music, history, and culture.
