= Jazz at Lincoln Center Orchestra =

American big band and jazz orchestra

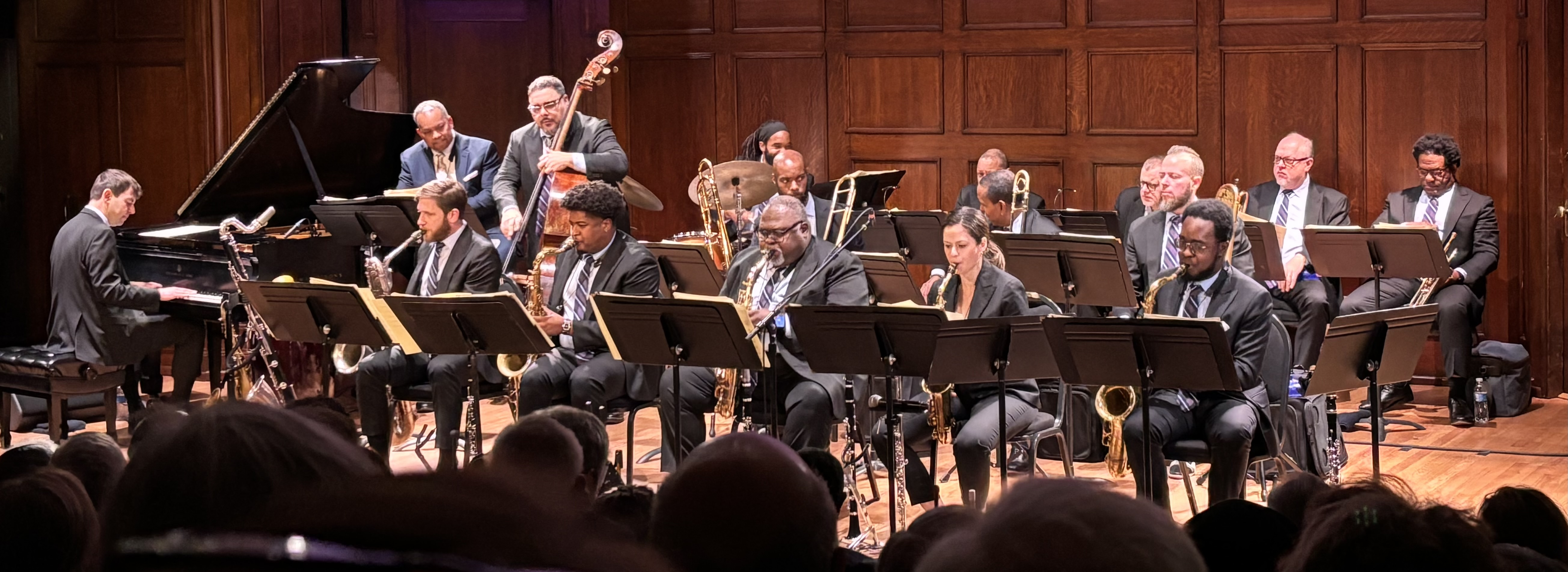
- The orchestra at The Sheldon in January 2026

Background information
- Origin: New York City, U.S.
- Genres: Jazz; swing
- Years active: 1988–present
- Label: Blue Engine
- Website: www.jazz.org

The Jazz at Lincoln Center Orchestra (JLCO), formerly the Lincoln Center Jazz Orchestra (LCJO), is an American big band and jazz orchestra led by trumpeter Wynton Marsalis. The orchestra is part of Jazz at Lincoln Center, a performing arts organization in New York City.

== History ==
In 1988, the orchestra was formed as an outgrowth of its concert series, Classical Jazz, with David Berger conducting. When Wynton Marsalis became artistic director in 1991, he emphasized the history of jazz, particularly Duke Ellington. Their first album was Portraits by Ellington (1992), and seven years later the Ellington centennial was honored with the album Live in Swing City: Swingin' with the Duke (1999).

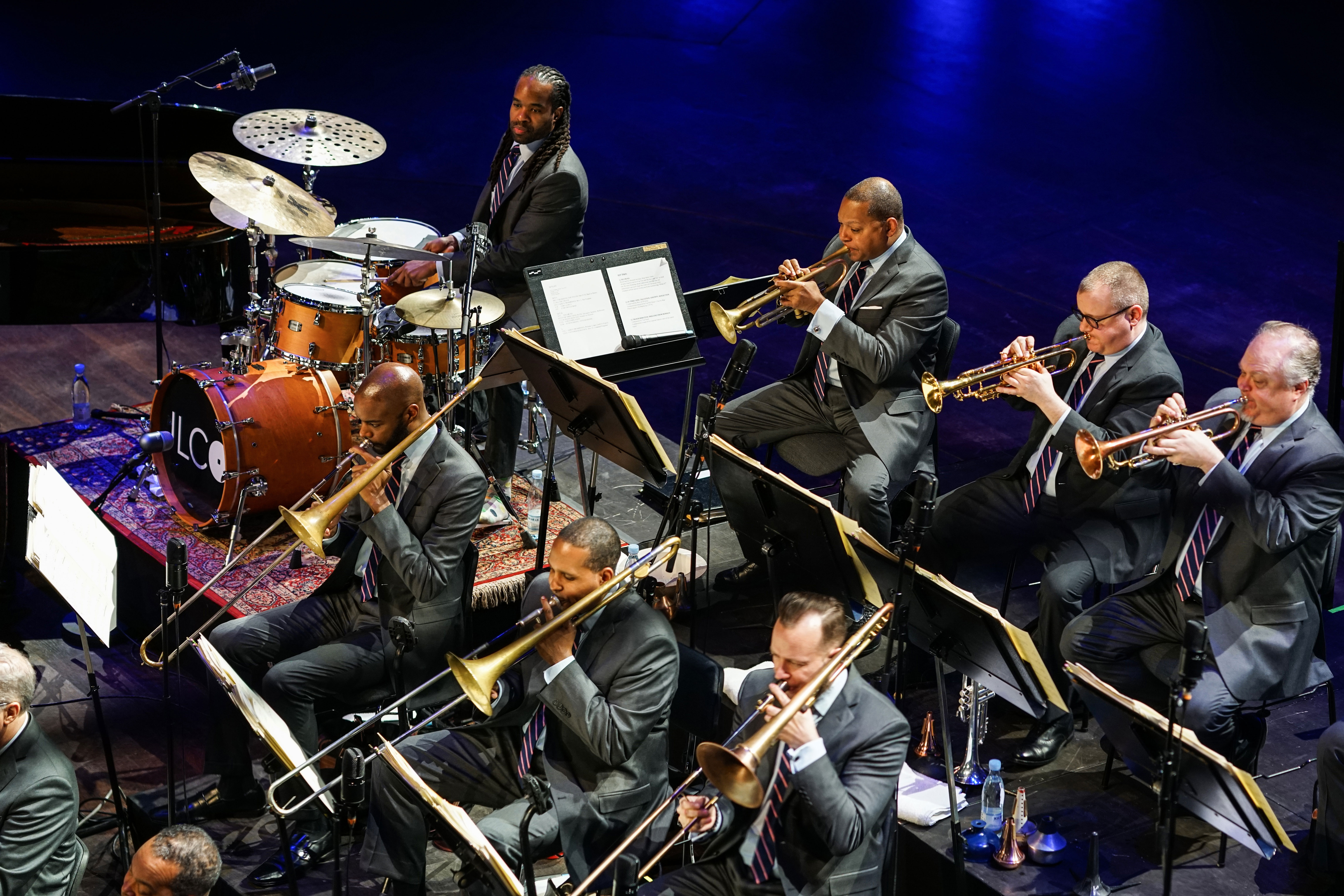
In Aalborg, Denmark, 2020

Under the leadership of Marsalis, the band performs at its home in Lincoln Center, tours throughout the U.S. and abroad, visits schools, appears on television, and performs with symphony orchestras. The band backed Wynton Marsalis on his album Blood on the Fields, which won the Pulitzer Prize for Music. The band was also nominated in 2020 for the Grammy Award for Best Latin Jazz Album with Una Noche con Rubén Blades.

Beginning in 1995, the Essentially Ellington competition has been hosted by the orchestra, recording the event's repertoire each year: Duke Ellington, Benny Carter, Count Basie, Dizzy Gillespie, and Mary Lou Williams compositions. Members also frequent as clinicians and host Q&A sessions during the festival, which concludes with a performance by the band.

Since 2015, the orchestra's albums have been issued on its own label, Blue Engine Records.

== Current band members ==
The orchestra's standard seating arrangement (with instruments labeled)

Saxophones

- Sherman Irby – lead alto saxophone, soprano saxophone, flute, clarinet (1995–1997, 2005–p.)
- Alexa Tarantino – alto and soprano saxophones, flute, clarinet (2024–p.)
- Chris Lewis – tenor and soprano saxophones, clarinet, bass clarinet (2025–p.)
- Abdias Armenteros – tenor and soprano saxophones, clarinet; holds The Zou Family Chair in Saxophone (2024–p.)
- Paul Nedzela – baritone and soprano saxophones, clarinet, bass clarinet (2014–p.)

Trumpets

- Ryan Kisor – lead trumpet (1994–p.)
- Wynton Marsalis – musical director, trumpet (1987–p.)
- Kenny Rampton – trumpet (2010–p.)
- Marcus Printup – trumpet (1993–p.)

Trombones

- Vincent Gardner – lead trombone (2000–p.)
- Christopher Crenshaw – trombone (2006–p.)
- Elliot Mason – trombone (2006–p.)

Rhythm section

- Dan Nimmer – piano; holds The Zou Family Chair (2005–p.)
- Carlos Henriquez – bass; holds The Mandel Family Chair in honor of Kathleen B. Mandel (1998–p.)
- Obed Calvaire – drums (2021–p.)

== Former members and resident artists ==
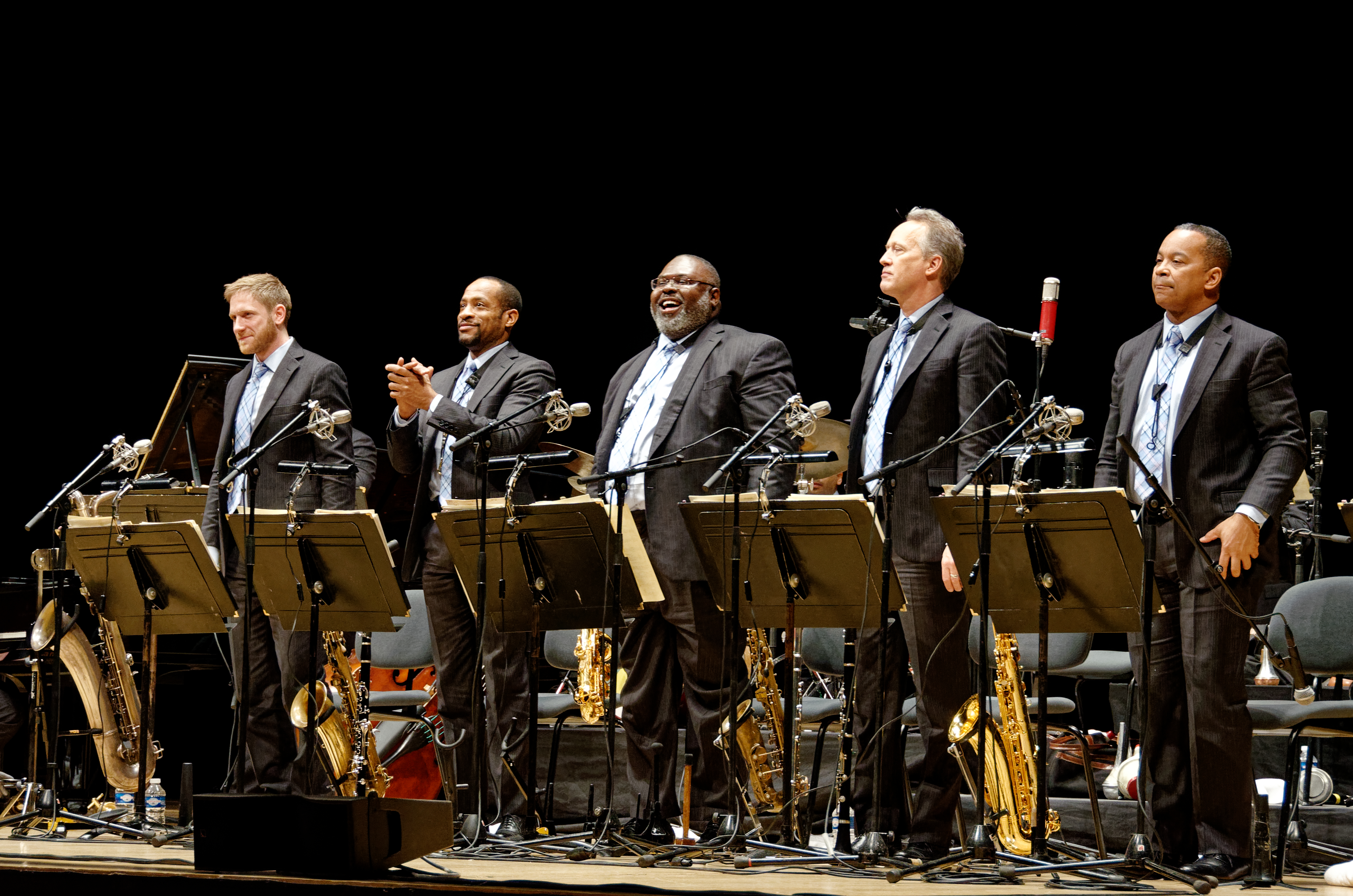
The orchestra's saxophone section in Lyon, 2016. From left: Paul Nedzela, Walter Blanding, Sherman Irby, Ted Nash, and Victor Goines.

- Wessell Anderson – alto and sopranino saxophones, clarinet (1998–2005)
- Ted Nash – alto and soprano saxophones, flute, clarinet (1998–2024)
- Joe Temperley – baritone saxophone (1991–2014)
- Walter Blanding – tenor and soprano saxophones, clarinet (1998–2024)
- Victor Goines – tenor and soprano saxophones, clarinet, bass clarinet (1993–2025)
- James Chirillo – guitar
- Camille Thurman – tenor saxophone (2018–2020 season)
- Ali Jackson – drums (2005–2018)
- Julian Lee – tenor, alto, and soprano saxophones (2015–2019)

== Discography ==
All albums are issued by the in-house label Blue Engine Records unless marked otherwise.

=== Albums ===
- Portraits by Ellington (Columbia, 1992) – live rec. 1991
- Jazz at Lincoln Center Presents: The Fire of the Fundamentals (Columbia, 1994) – live rec. 1991–1993
- Jazz at Lincoln Center: They Came to Swing (Columbia, 1994) – live rec. 1992–1994
- Blood on the Fields (Columbia, 1997) – rec. 1995
- Live in Swing City: Swingin' with Duke (Columbia, 1999) – live rec. 1998
- Big Train (Columbia/Sony Classical, 1999) – rec. 1998
- Essentially Ellington 2000 (Warner Bros., 2000) – rec. 1999
- All Rise (Sony Classical, 2002) – rec. 2001
- Plays the Music of Duke Ellington (Brooks Brothers, 2004) – rec. 1999–2003
- Cast of Cats (DMX Music, 2004)
- A Love Supreme (Palmetto, 2005)
- Don't Be Afraid: The Music of Charles Mingus (Palmetto, 2005)
- Congo Square (Jazz at Lincoln Center, 2007)
- Portrait in Seven Shades (Jazz at Lincoln Center, 2010)
- Vitoria Suite (EmArcy, 2010) OCLC 659741065
- Wynton Marsalis & Eric Clapton – Play the Blues: Live from Jazz at Lincoln Center (Reprise, 2011)
- Live in Cuba (2015)
- Big Band Holidays (2015)
- The Abyssinian Mass (2016)
- The Music of John Lewis (2017)
- All Jazz Is Modern: 30 Years of Jazz at Lincoln Center Vol. 1 (2017)
- Handful of Keys (2017)
- United We Swing: Best of the Jazz at Lincoln Center Galas (2018)
- Una Noche con Rubén Blades (2018)
- Swing Symphony (2019)
- Jazz and Art (2019)
- Jazz for Kids (2019)
- Big Band Holidays II (2019)
- Sherman Irby's Inferno (2020)
- The Music of Wayne Shorter (2020)
- Black, Brown & Beige (2020)
- Rock Chalk Suite (2020)
- Christopher Crenshaw's The Fifties: A Prism (2020)
- A Swingin' Sesame Street Celebration (2020)
- The Democracy! Suite (2021)
- The Jungle (Symphony No. 4) (2023)
- Wynton Marsalis plays Louis Armstrong's Hot Fives and Hot Sevens (2023)
- Big Band Holidays III (2023)
- Freedom, Justice, and Hope (2024)
- The Music of Max Roach (2024)
- The Shanghai Suite (2024)
- Essentially Ellington: The JLCO Recordings, 1999–2025 (2025)
- Essentially Ellington 2026 (2025)
- Big Band Holidays III (2025)
- We the People (2026)
- Let Freedom Swing (2026)

=== Singles ===
- God Rest Ye Merry Gentleman / Little Drummer Boy (2016)
- Spotify Singles: JLCO Featuring Wynton Marsalis & Jon Batiste (2017)
- Quarantine Blues (Jazz at Home) (2020)
- Walkin' (Jazz at Home) (2020)
- Everybody Wear They Mask (Jazz at Home) (2020)
- The Ever Fonky Lowdown (2020)
- Yardbird Suite (Jazz at Home) (2020)
- Everything Changes (2025)

== See also ==
- Jazz at Lincoln Center
- Wynton Marsalis
