= Una Noche con Rubén Blades =

Live album by the Jazz at Lincoln Center Orchestra
- Released: October 19, 2018
- Recorded: November 15, 2014
- Venues: Rose Hall, Jazz at Lincoln Center
- Genre: Latin jazz
- Length: 76:50
- Label: Blue Engine
- Producer: Carlos Henriquez

The Jazz at Lincoln Center Orchestra chronology
United We Swing: Best of the Jazz at Lincoln Center Galas (2018)	Una Noche con Rubén Blades (2018)

Una Noche con Rubén Blades (A Night with Rubén Blades) is a jazz live album by the Jazz at Lincoln Center Orchestra with Wynton Marsalis and featuring Rubén Blades.

== Reception ==
The album received a Grammy Award nomination for Best Latin Jazz Album. It peaked at No. 39 on the Billboard Top Latin Albums chart.

== Track listing ==
No.	Title	Length
1.	"Carlos Henriquez Introduction"	0:38
2.	"Ban Ban Quere"	6:30
3.	"Too Close for Comfort"	5:55
4.	"El Cantante"	8:43
5.	"I Can’t Give You Anything But Love"	6:40
6.	"Apóyate en Mi Alma"	5:50
7.	"Pedro Navaja"	8:09
8.	"Begin the Beguine"	7:39
9.	"Sin Tu Cariño"	7:48
10.	"Rubén's Medley: Ligia Elena/El Número 6/Juan Pachanga"	12:06
11.	"Patria (Encore)"	6:52
Total length:		76:50
