= Manuel Valera =

Cuban pianist and composer (born 1980)

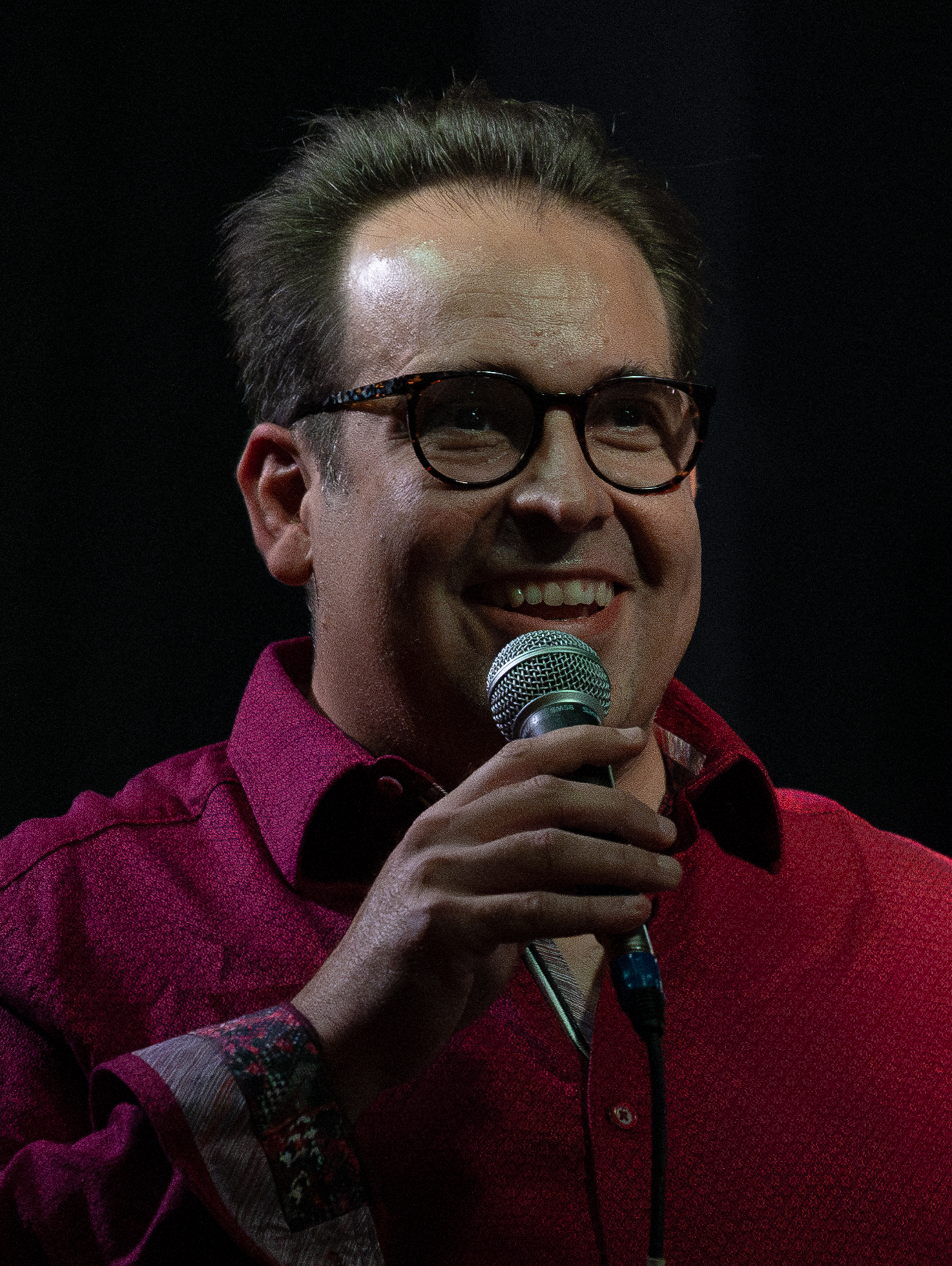
- Valera in 2024

Background information
- Born: October 17, 1980; Havana, Cuba
- Genre: Jazz
- Occupation: Musician
- Instruments: Piano; keyboards
- Label: Mavo
- Website: manuelvalera.com

Manuel Valera (born October 17, 1980) is a Cuban pianist and composer.

== Biography ==
Valera was born in Havana, Cuba. He graduated from South Broward High School, Hollywood, Florida. Since 2000, he has lived in New York City, where he attended New School University. His playing is influenced by Bill Evans, Chick Corea and Keith Jarrett, and he has worked extensively in the groups of Dafnis Prieto, Arturo Sandoval, Paquito D'Rivera, Brian Lynch, Yosvany Terry, Jeff "Tain" Watts and Lenny White.

Valera's first CD as a leader Forma Nueva was released in 2004. It features bassist John Patitucci, drummers Bill Stewart and Horacio "El Negro" Hernandez and saxophonist Seamus Blake. Historia, Melancolia and Vientos were released between 2005–2007, featuring drummers Antonio Sanchez and Ernesto Simpson, saxophonist Seamus Blake and Joel Frahm, bassists Ben Street and James Genus and percussionist Luis Quintero. 2009 marked the release of Currents, a trio recording with Genus and Simpson and it was also Valera's debut on the Maxjazz label.

After a hiatus as a leader to focus on sideman work, in 2012 Valera released New Cuban Express with Yosvany Terry on saxophone, John Benitez on bass, Tom Guarna on guitar, Eric Doob on drums, and percussionist Mauricio Herrera.
This recording earned him a nomination for a 2013 Grammy Award in the category "Best Latin Jazz Album".

== Discography ==
=== As leader ===
- Forma Nueva (2004, Mavo) with John Patitucci, Bill Stewart, Horacio "El Negro" Hernandez & Seamus Blake
- Historia (2005, Fresh Sound) with Ben Street, Antonio Sanchez & Seamus Blake
- Melancolia (2006, Mavo) with Ben Street, Antonio Sanchez, Seamus Blake, Luis Quintero
- Vientos (2007, Anzic Records) with James Genus, Ernesto Simpson, Joel Frahm
- Currents (2009, Maxjazz) with James Genus & Ernesto Simpson
- New Cuban Express (2012, Mavo) with Yosvany Terry, Tom Guarna, John Benitez, Eric Doob & Mauricio Herrera
- Expectativas (2013, CD Baby) with Yosvany Terry, Tom Guarna, John Benitez, Paulo Stagnaro & Ludwig Afonso
- Self Portrait (2014, CD Baby)
- In Motion (2014, Criss Cross Jazz) with Yosvany Terry, Tom Guarna, Alex Sipiagin Hans Glawischnig, Mauricio Herrera and Ludwig Afonso
- Live at Firehouse 12 (2015, CD Baby) with E.J. Strickland and Hans Glawischnig
- Urban Landscapes (2015, Destiny Records) with Groove Square
- The Seasons (2017, Mavo Records) with E.J. Strickland and Hans Glawischnig
- The Planets (2018, Mavo Records) with E.J. Strickland and Hans Glawischnig
- Jose Martin en Nueva York (2020, Greenleaf music) New Cuban Express Big Band
- Distancia (2022, Greenleaf Music) with New Cuban Express Big Band
- Vessel (2023, Criss Cross Jazz) with John Ellis, Alex Norris, Hamish Smith, Mark Whitfield Jr
- Rise Again Vol 1 (2024, Mavo Records) with New Cuban Express
- Nevermind Tomorrow (2024, Mavo Records) with Janek Gwizdala and Mark Whitfield Jr

=== As sideman ===
- John Benitez, Purpose
- Oscar Feldman, Oscar E Familia
- Carlos Henriquez, Dizzy con Clave (RodBros, 2018)
- Dana Lauren, It's You or No One
- Brain Lynch, Conclave, Vol. 2
- Dafnis Prieto, The Sooner The Better
- Dafnis Prieto, Si o Si Quartet Live at the Jazz Standard
- Samuel Torres,Yaounde

== Awards ==
- Finalist in the 2004 and 2006 Great American Jazz Competition
- Recipient of the 2005 and 2006 ASCAP Young Composers Award
- Final nominee in the Up & Coming Musician of the Year category of the Jazz Journalists Association Awards.
- Received a commission for the 2007, 2013 and 2017 Chamber Music America New Works Award.
- New Cuban Express nominated for 2013 Grammy, Best Latin Jazz Album of the Year
- 2019 Guggenheim Fellowship in musical composition
