= Blood on the Fields =

Studio album by Wynton Marsalis
- Released: June 17, 1997
- Recorded: January 22–25, 1995
- Studio: Grand Hall of the Masonic Grand Lodge
- Genre: Jazz
- Length: 2:42:18
- Label: Columbia

Wynton Marsalis chronology
In Gabriel's Garden (1996)	Blood on the Fields (1997)	Jump Start and Jazz (1997)

Professional ratings
Review scores
Source	Rating
AllMusic	4/5 stars
The Penguin Guide to Jazz Recordings	3.5/4 stars

Blood on the Fields is a two-and-a-half-hour jazz oratorio composed by Wynton Marsalis for the Jazz at Lincoln Center Orchestra, released by Columbia Records in 1997. It debuted on January 28, 1997 at Woolsey Hall at Yale University.

It was commissioned by Lincoln Center and covers the history of slavery and its aftermath in the United States. The oratorio tells the story of two slaves, Jesse and Leona, as they traverse the difficult journey to freedom. The narrative suggests that the individual freedom and agency of its protagonists is necessarily and inextricably intertwined with the empowerment of the community and nation as a whole. The work received the 1997 Pulitzer Prize for Music, which was the first time the prize was ever given for a jazz music composition, an honor that had previously been reserved for classical composers.

== Track listing ==
All tracks are written and arranged by Wynton Marsalis.

Disc one
No.	Title	Length
1.	"Calling the Indians Out" (part 1)	5:27
2.	"Move Over"	10:04
3.	"You Don't Hear No Drums"	11:52
4.	"The Market Place"	6:02
5.	"Soul for Sale"	6:07
6.	"Plantation Coffle March"	10:45
7.	"Work Song (Blood on the Fields)"	8:26

Disc two
No.	Title	Length
1.	"Lady's Lament"	6:16
2.	"Flying High"	2:04
3.	"Oh We Have a Friend in Jesus"	4:06
4.	"God Don't Like Ugly"	8:06
5.	"Juba and a O'Brown Squaw"	6:07
6.	"Follow the Drinking Gourd" (part 1)	2:21
7.	"My Soul Fell Down"	2:18
8.	"Forty Lashes"	7:30
9.	"What a Fool I've Been"	2:34
10.	"Back to Basics"	11:28

Disc three
No.	Title	Length
1.	"I Hold Out My Hand"	7:40
2.	"Look and See"	5:07
3.	"The Sun Is Gonna Shine" (part 1)	2:21
4.	"Will the Sun Come Out?"	9:09
5.	"The Sun Is Gonna Shine" (part 2)	6:45
6.	"Chant to Call the Indians Out"	3:56
7.	"Calling the Indians Out" (part 2)	5:40
8.	"Follow the Drinking Gourd" (part 2)	1:45
9.	"Freedom Is in the Trying"	2:47
10.	"Due North"	5:35
Total length:		2:42:18

== Personnel ==
- Wynton Marsalis – trumpet, oratory vocals
- Miles Griffith (as Jesse), Cassandra Wilson (as Leona), Jon Hendricks (as wise man) – vocals
- Roger Ingram (lead), Marcus Printup (second), Russell Gunn (third) – trumpet, oratory vocals
- Ron Westray (lead), Wayne Goodman (second) – trombone, oratory vocals
- Wycliffe Gordon – trombone, tuba, oratory vocals
- Walter Blanding – soprano saxophone, oratory vocals
- Wes Anderson – lead alto saxophone, oratory vocals
- Robert Stewart – lead tenor saxophone, oratory vocals
- Victor Goines – tenor and soprano saxophones, clarinet, bass clarinet, oratory vocals
- James Carter – baritone saxophone, clarinet, bass clarinet, oratory vocals
- Regina Carter, Michael Ward – violin, oratory vocals
- Eric Reed – piano, oratory vocals
- Reginald Veal – double bass, oratory vocals
- Herlin Riley – drums, tambourine, oratory vocals
