= Walter Blanding =

American jazz saxophonist and clarinetist (born 1971)

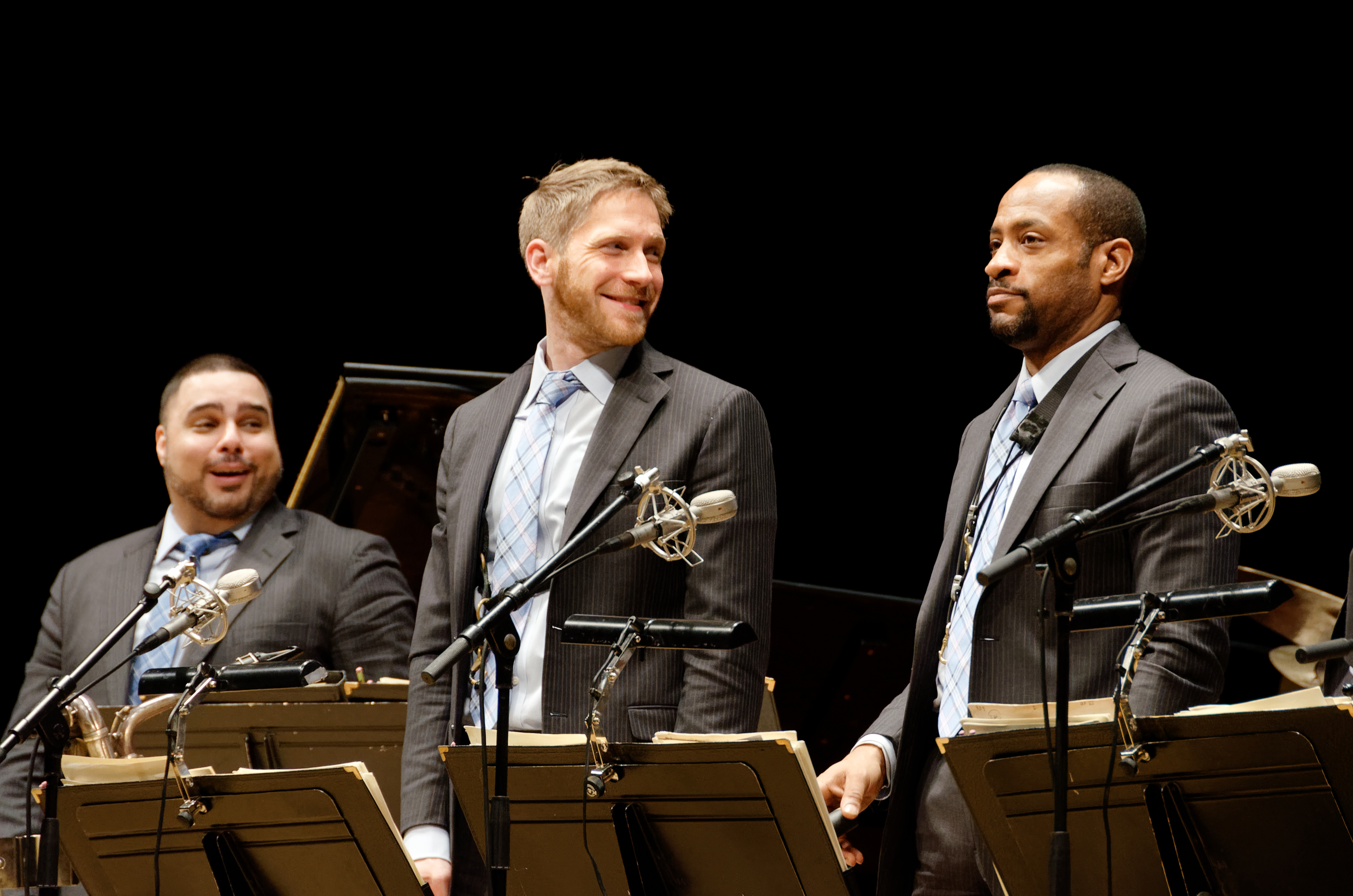
- Blanding with the Jazz at Lincoln Center Orchestra, Lyon, France, 2016

Background information
- Born: Walter Blanding Jr. August 14, 1971 (age 55); Cleveland, Ohio, U.S.
- Genres: Jazz
- Occupation: Musician
- Instruments: Tenor saxophone; clarinet
- Years active: 1990s–present
- Label: Criss Cross Jazz
- Formerly of: Jazz at Lincoln Center Orchestra

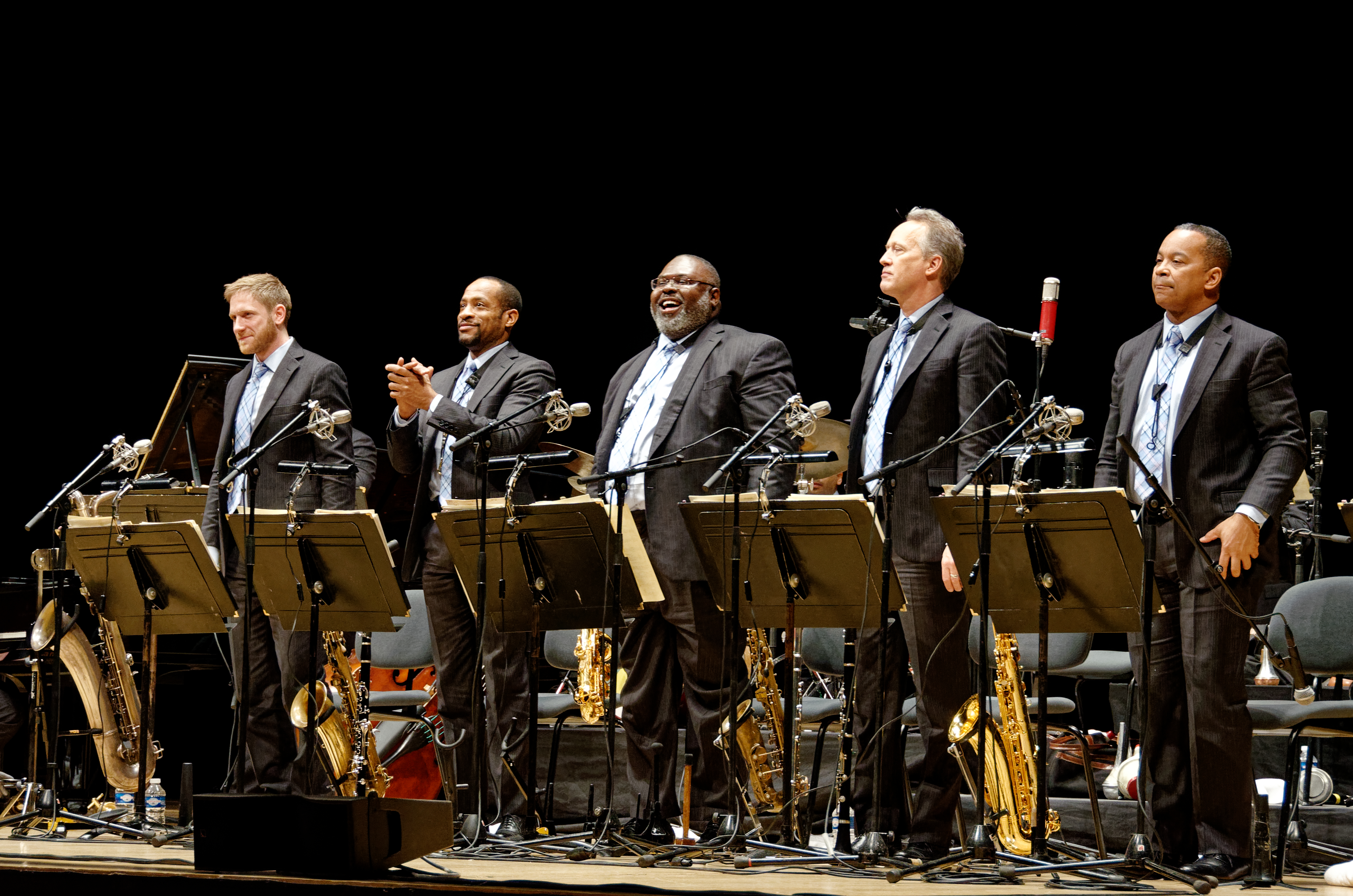
The Jazz at Lincoln Center Orchestra at Maurice Ravel Auditorium, Lyon, France, 2016. From left: Paul Nedzela, Blanding, Sherman Irby, Ted Nash, and Victor Goines.

Walter Blanding Jr. (born August 14, 1971) is an American jazz saxophonist and clarinetist.

== Biography ==
Born in Cleveland, Ohio, Blanding grew up in a musical family in New York City. His father, a bassist, and his mother, a pianist and singer, both played in the house band at the Village Gate jazz club, and Blanding played with them as a teenager. He studied under Barry Harris and went to Fiorello H. LaGuardia High School. With the group Tough Young Tenors, in 1991, he made his debut recording. For four years in the mid-1990s, he lived in Israel, where he taught music in Israeli schools. After returning to the United States, he became a member of the Lincoln Center Jazz Orchestra, in 1998, and was involved with live performances of Wynton Marsalis's Blood on the Fields.

Blanding has performed or recorded with Farid Barron, Cab Calloway, the Count Basie Orchestra, Cab Calloway, Wycliffe Gordon, Rodney Green, Roy Hargrove, the Harper Brothers (Philip and Winard), Louis Hayes, Illinois Jacquet, Ryan Kisor, Odean Pope, Eric Reed, Marcus Roberts, and Rodney Whitaker, among others.

Since 2023, Blanding has taught as the assistant professor of jazz saxophone at Michigan State University.

== Other work ==
As a member of the Lincoln Center Jazz Orchestra (later renamed the Jazz at Lincoln Center Orchestra), Blanding spent time at the band's Shanghai branch, Jazz at Lincoln Center Shanghai. During his there, in 2018–2020, he also worked with the student jazz band at Shanghai Community International School Pudong.

== Discography ==
=== As leader ===
- The Olive Tree (Criss Cross Jazz, 1999) – with Ryan Kisor (trumpet), Farid Barron (piano), Rodney Whitaker (bass), Rodney Green (drums)

=== As sideman ===
With Wynton Marsalis

- Big Train (Columbia / Sony Classical, 1999)
