= Ivan Farmakovsky =

Russian pianist (born 1973)

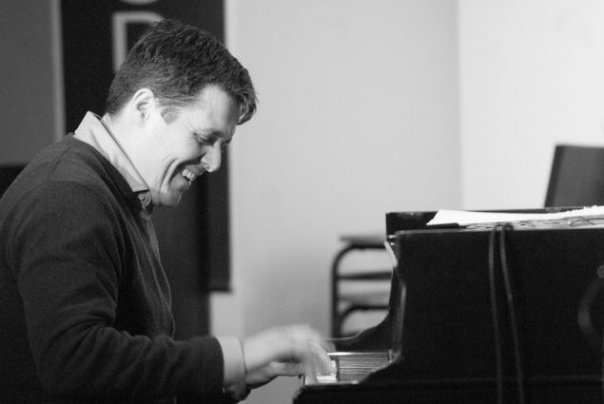
- Ivan Farmakovsky; Photo: Pavel Korbut

Background information
- Born: 1 February 1973 (age 53)
- Origin: Moscow, Russia
- Genres: Jazz
- Occupation: Pianist
- Website: Official Website

Ivan Farmakovsky (born 1 February 1973 in Moscow, Russia) is a Russian jazz pianist, composer and arranger.

== Biography ==
Born into a creative family of an actress and pianist, Ivan Farmakovsky attended a musical school under the studio of recreation center "Moskvorechie" since the age of 5. At that time this institution was practically the only school in The Soviet Union where jazz was part of educational program together with classical music. In 1988 he became student of the variety-jazz department of The Gnessin State Musical College - continuing in Gnessin Russian Academy of Music. One of Ivan's mentors was Igor Brill, one of Russia's most respected jazz pianists. During his student days, participated in various international competitions and succeeded to be a prize-winner in the Europe Jazz Contest in Belgium, 1997.

Ivan's talent was noticed by saxophonist Igor Butman after him playing as sideman with Benny Golson and Valery Ponomarev. Soon after the gig, Ivan Farmakovsky became a member of Igor's quartet and Big Band. Since that time he played with Curtis Fuller, Randy Brecker, Bill Evans, Wynton Marsalis, Seamus Blake and many others.

== Debut album ==
In 2008 Ivan Farmakovsky recorded a debut album entitled Next to the Shadow, which consisted of his own compositions. The recording took place at Sear Sound Studios in New York City, in collaboration with such musicians as Ryan Kisor (trumpet), Igor Butman (saxophone), Ugonna Okegwo (bass) and Gene Jackson (drums). The album was released physically in Russia (Boheme Music label, April 2009) and digitally in the US on Jazzheads (January 2010).
