= Big Band Holidays =

2015 album by Jazz at Lincoln Center Orchestra and Wynton Marsalis

Studio album by Jazz at Lincoln Center Orchestra and Wynton Marsalis
- Released: October 30, 2015
- Genres: Christmas; big band
- Label: Blue Engine Records

Jazz at Lincoln Center Orchestra chronology
Live in Cuba (2015)	Big Band Holidays (2015)

Wynton Marsalis chronology
Live in Cuba (2015)	Big Band Holidays (2015)

Big Band Holidays is a 2015 Christmas album by the Jazz at Lincoln Center Orchestra and Wynton Marsalis, released on October 30, 2015, by Blue Engine Records.

== Track listing ==
1. "Jingle Bells"
2. "Have Yourself a Merry Little Christmas" feat. Cécile McLorin Salvant
3. "White Christmas"
4. "'Zat You, Santa Claus?" feat. René Marie
5. "A Cradle in Bethlehem" feat. Gregory Porter
6. "We Three Kings"
7. "What Child Is This?" feat. Cécile McLorin Salvant
8. "Merry Christmas Baby" feat. Gregory Porter
9. "It's Easy to Blame the Weather" feat. Cécile McLorin Salvant
10. "I'll Be Home for Christmas" feat. René Marie
11. "Good Morning Blues" feat. Cécile McLorin Salvant
12. Band Introductions
