= Essentially Ellington High School Jazz Band Competition and Festival =

American high school jazz competition and festival

The Essentially Ellington High School Jazz Band Competition & Festival, often shortened to Essentially Ellington or just EE, is an annual high school jazz festival and competition that takes place at Jazz at Lincoln Center in New York City. The festival is aimed at encouraging young musicians to play music by Duke Ellington and other jazz musicians.

== Process ==
Every year, Jazz at Lincoln Center transcribes arrangements and compositions by Duke Ellington and sends them to participating high school and community jazz band directors across the United States and Canada. During the year, band directors are sent a newsletter and given access to online educational materials relevant to Ellington and his music. Directors can send recordings of their band's finished performances to Jazz at Lincoln Center for evaluation. These recordings can count as applications to the Essentially Ellington High School Jazz Band Competition & Festival in New York City, though a non-competitive, comments-only option is also offered. Fifteen top bands are invited to compete in the festival, occurring every May at Jazz at Lincoln Center's Frederick P. Rose Hall.

After the finalists are announced, clinicians; usually members of the Jazz at Lincoln Center Orchestra; are sent to each of the finalist schools to provide a jazz workshop and prepare the bands for competition. At the New York festival, students are immersed in workshops, jam sessions, an open rehearsal and Q&A with Wynton Marsalis and the Jazz at Lincoln Center Orchestra, and performances by the participating bands. The festival ends with a concert by the Jazz at Lincoln Center Orchestra and the three top-placing bands, as well as an awards ceremony recognizing individual soloists and sections.

== History ==
Beginning in 1995, Essentially Ellington materials were offered only to school bands across New York State and the greater New York metropolitan area. Over the next few years, the program grew to include all schools across the United States and Canada. As of 2025, over 7,100 schools across 58 countries have received free scores and resources.

In 2002, the first Essentially Ellington Writing Contest was held, inviting participating students to submit an essay or short story discussing various topics of jazz. Winners received the chance to reading their essay on the festival's opening day, as well as having a seat in the Rose Theater engraved in their honor. The contest was discontinued following the conclusion of the 2011 festival.

In early 2006, Jazz at Lincoln Center announced the debut of Essentially Ellington's first regional festival. The regional festivals are non-competitive and offer high school jazz bands of different levels the opportunity to play Ellington's music and receive professional feedback.

Starting in 2008, selections by big band composers other than Ellington were transcribed for the first time. In succeeding years, music by Benny Carter, Count Basie, Dizzy Gillespie, Mary Lou Williams, Gerald Wilson, Fletcher Henderson, Benny Golson, Melba Liston, and others have been released.

In 2013, a new selection process was introduced in which the top three bands chosen from five national regions would compete in New York City. Another major change made that year was the opening up of the main competition to allow conglomerate bands; extra-curricular bands composed of students from more than one high school; to compete directly with the high school bands. From 2005 until 2012, one conglomerate band was chosen to appear as a special guest in an exhibition performance outside of the festival, with the exception of 2008, when there were two conglomerate winners.

Additionally in 2013, the Gerhard W. Vosshall Student Composition/Arranging Contest was added to the festival following a donation from the Vosshall family made in Gerhard's honor. The contest was renamed the Dr. J. Douglas White Student Composition and Arranging Contest in 2016. Each year, a winning composition is chosen from submissions sent from high school students in the US and Canada to be recorded and performed by the Jazz at Lincoln Center Orchestra. The winning composer receives a cash prize, a trip to the competition in order to conduct their piece, and a composition lesson. The lesson was originally with Ellington historian David Berger, but shifted to JLCO saxophonist Ted Nash in 2015.

The 25th edition of the competition and festival, scheduled for 2020, announced that the region system would be eliminated, and a total of eighteen bands would be selected, three more than in years past. Also present for the first time were five youth bands from Japan, Scotland, Australia, Spain, and Cuba, increasing the total number of participating ensembles to twenty-three. However, due to the COVID-19 pandemic, the in-person festival was cancelled, and all events were held virtually. No winners were announced, although honors were given to individual soloists and sections.

The COVID-19 pandemic forced the 2021 festival to also be held virtually. Jazz at Lincoln Center pushed back the release of new music until the 2021-2022 school year and encouraged participating schools to submit one tune from the entire Essentially Ellington library in either a synchronous or asynchronous fashion. Submission due dates were pushed back to March and the virtual festival to early June. The 2021 festival also introduced new rules regarding submissions from conglomerate bands, a previously largely unregulated field. The festival provided an official definition of conglomerate bands, stating that they need to follow a specific course of study, as well as a scope and sequence, all in addition to weekly rehearsals and scheduled public performances. All-Star, All-State, and All-Region bands are barred from competition, as are bands created for the sole purpose of competing in Essentially Ellington.

In 2025, for the 30th anniversary of the competition and festival, the region system was once again temporarily disbanded and a total of thirty bands were selected to participate, double the amount in years prior. Twenty-seven bands were chosen across the United States via audition, and three international bands from Japan, Australia, and Spain received special invitation to compete. For the first time, the competition was held in two rounds. In round one, the 30 bands were split in two groups of 15, with each group adjudicated by a separate judging panel. Both panels advanced five ensembles each, creating a final round of ten competitors to compete for a spot in the top three. The final concert and awards ceremony was held at the Metropolitan Opera House at Lincoln Center.

== Notable alumni ==
Many Essentially Ellington participants have gone on to lead successful musical careers. Some have become permanent or substitute members of the Jazz at Lincoln Center Orchestra and faculty for other Jazz at Lincoln Center youth programs.

- Kris Bowers – composer, pianist, and film director
- Roxy Coss – saxophonist and composer
- Aaron Diehl – pianist and composer
- Alex Dugdale – saxophonist
- Carlos Henriquez – JLCO bassist
- Coleman Hughes – podcast host and writer
- Samara Joy – jazz vocalist
- Samuel Mehr – cognitive scientist
- Jahaan Sweet – record producer and songwriter
- Alexa Tarantino – JLCO alto saxophonist, composer, and educator
- Isaiah J. Thompson – pianist and composer
- Erica von Kleist – flautist, saxophonist, and composer
- Abdias Armenteros - JLCO tenor saxophonist
- Summer Camargo - trumpeter of SNL Live Band
- Patrick Bartley - saxophonist, composer, and educator
- Philip Norris - bassist
- Tatum Greenblatt - trumpeter, Julliard jazz faculty, and composer

== Finalists ==
Several high school bands from the Seattle area have participated including repeat finalists: Roosevelt; Garfield; Bothell; Shorewood; Mount Si; Edmonds-Woodway; Mountlake Terrace; Newport and Ballard high schools. In 2008, five of the fifteen bands to compete were from the greater Seattle area. Acknowledging the region's dominance at the competition, Marsalis, tongue only half in cheek, challenged the remaining schools/regions, "to do something about Seattle and Washington."

== See also ==
- Jazz at Lincoln Center
