= Gerald Wright (disambiguation) =

Gerald Wright (born 1942) is a member of the Oklahoma Senate.

Gerald Wright may also refer to:

- Gerald Wright (American football referee), see 2012 Chicago Bears season
- Gerald Wright, character in The Wright Way

== See also ==
- Gearld Wright (1933–2002), American politician
- Gerry Wright (disambiguation)
