= Tin Tin Deo =

1948 jazz composition by Dizzy Gillespie

"Tin Tin Deo" is a song composed by Dizzy Gillespie, Gil Fuller, and Luciano "Chano" Pozo, first recorded on October 25, 1948. Along with Manteca, written in 1947, it is one of the foremost contributions of Gillespie to Afro-Cuban jazz.
