= Alex Dugdale =

American saxophonist and jazz performer

Alex Dugdale is an American saxophonist and jazz performer.

== Early life ==
Dugdale was born in Colombia, but as an infant was adopted by American family in Seattle, Washington. As a child, he fell in love with tap dancing after watching Savion Glover on Sesame Street. He started taking dance lessons at the age of six with Cheryl Johnson and Anthony Peters, the Seattle based duo.

In 2002, Dugdale performed on stage along with Gregory Hines and at the age of 11, he joined a steel drum player in a New York City subway while visiting New York City Tap Festival. Eventually, his passion started to grow towards instrumental jazz. Since he already was an experienced clarinet player, he picked up saxophone, and has played that instrument ever since.

Dugdale has a Master's degree in arts from the Seattle Pacific University as well as Bachelor's degree in performance from the Eastman School of Music.

He attended Roosevelt High School in Seattle, Washington where he played clarinet and saxophone with Scott Brown and Mark Taylor.

== Career ==
After graduation, Dugdale started working with Bill Evans at the Radiance Dance Theater. As a tap dancer, Dugdale had performed with Vancouver and Port Angeles Symphony Orchestras, as well as Rochester Philharmonic and Seattle Philharmonic Orchestras. In 2010, Alex had participated at the Disney All American College in Disneyland. In 2012, he performed with such bands as The Temptations, The Pointer Sisters and Four Tops as well as with John Legend, Dianne Walker, Chester Whitmore, Wynton Marsalis, David Meder, Najee and others.

Between 2015 and 2016 he was an intern for Centrum. Currently he works for a band department at the Bishop Blanchet High School as well as educator and track coordinator at the Jazz Port Townsend of Earshot Jazz from which he also got an Earshot Jazz Golden Ear Award as Emerging Artist of the Year. When he is not teaching, he is playing music with Cole Schuster, Greg Feingold, Max Holmberg, and John Hansen. Dugdale was active throughout the pandemic and won the Earshot Jazz Golden Ear award for Jazz Instrumentalist of the year, doing live stream shows with SRJO and Boxleys and with his own band at various streaming sites. In 2022 Alex Dugdale was named the Artist in Residence for the Earshot Jazz Festival creating four unique shows starting with a 10 piece world funk band, a full jazz big band, a trio of tap dancers with a jazz rhythm section and his classic jazz sextet.

Dugdale continues to record, teach and perform in the seattle area, currently teaching tap dance at the University of Washington, general music at Our Lady of the Lakes Parish School and performs with his quintet with an album from his funk band on the way in the spring of 2025.

During each year's holiday season, he also performs Duke Ellington's Sacred Music with the Seattle Repertory Jazz Orchestra and his own Fade Quintet band.
