= Victor Goines =

American jazz saxophonist & clarinetist (born 1961)

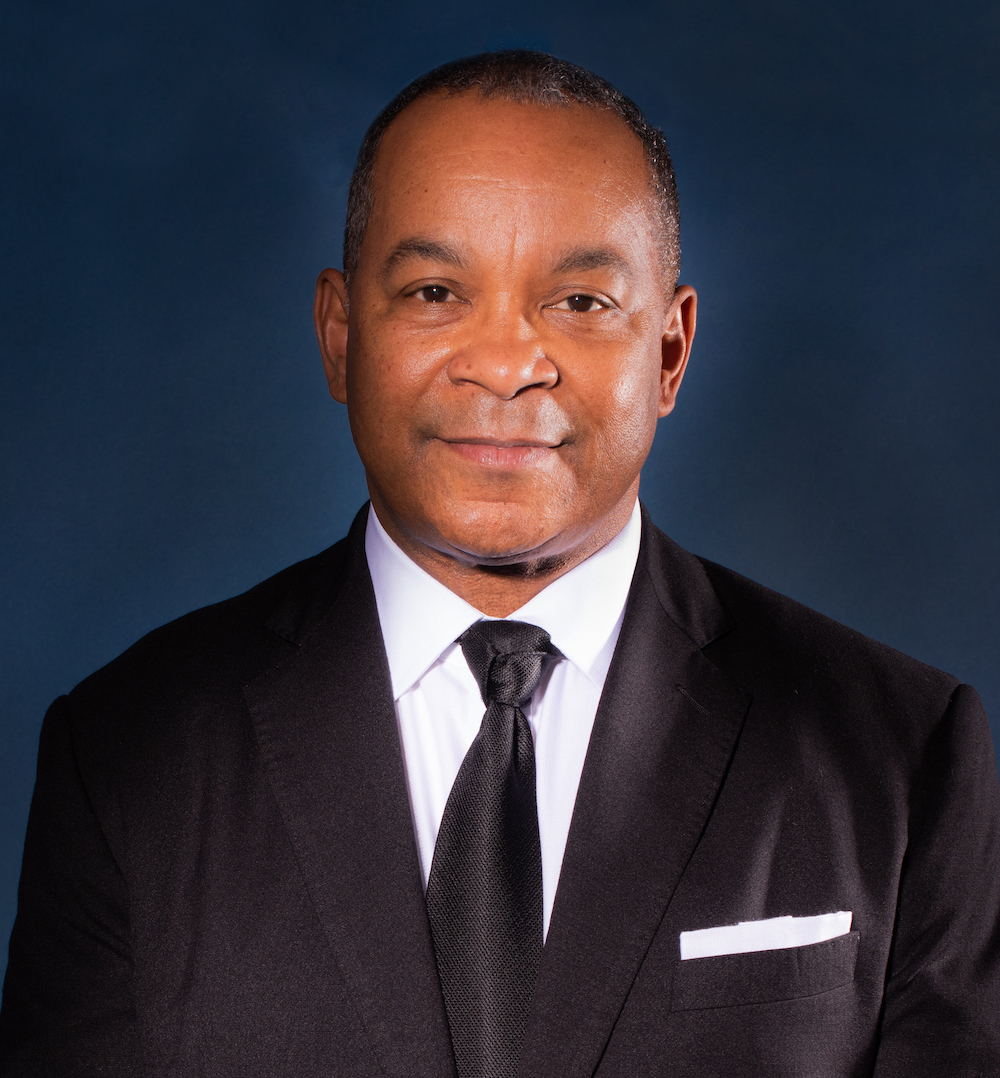
- Goines in 2016

Background information
- Born: Victor Louis Goines; August 6, 1961 (age 65); New Orleans, Louisiana, U.S.
- Genres: Jazz, avant-garde, big band, traditional New Orleans
- Occupations: Jazz Chair, New Orleas Center for the Creative Arts - Musician, composer, educator
- Instruments: Saxophone, clarinet
- Years active: 1980–present
- Labels: AFO, Criss Cross, Rosemary Joseph
- Website: www.victorgoines.com

Victor Louis Goines (/ˈɡɔɪnz/; born August 6, 1961) is an American jazz saxophonist and clarinetist, and arts administrator. From 2000 to 2007, he served as the inaugural Director of Jazz Studies at the Juilliard School. From 2008 to 2014, he held the position of Director of Jazz Studies at Northwestern University. Additionally, from September 2022 to February 2026, he was the President and Chief Executive Officer of Jazz St. Louis. He is currently the Jazz Chair at the New Orleans Center for the Creative Arts.

== Career ==
Goines graduated from St. Augustine High School in New Orleans and has been a member of Jazz at Lincoln Center Orchestra and the Wynton Marsalis Septet since 1993. Goines served as the director of jazz studies and professor for the Bienen School of Music at Northwestern University from 2008 to 2022. He became president and chief executive officer of Jazz St. Louis in September 2022. Goines concluded his tenure with Jazz St. Louis at the close of February 2026.

Goines has collaborated with Terence Blanchard, Dee Dee Bridgewater, Ruth Brown, Ray Charles, Bo Diddley, Bob Dylan, Dizzy Gillespie, Freddie Green, Lionel Hampton, Freddie Hubbard, B.B. King, Lenny Kravitz, Branford Marsalis, Ellis Marsalis, James Moody, Dianne Reeves, Marcus Roberts, Diana Ross, Eric Clapton, Wycliffe Gordon, and Stevie Wonder to name a few.

He has performed on more than 20 recordings, including the soundtracks for three Ken Burns documentaries and the films Undercover Blues (1993), Night Falls on Manhattan (1997), and Rosewood (1997). Goines has performed on Wynton Marsalis's Pulitzer Prize-winning "Blood on the Fields" and Ted Nash's Grammy-winning "Presidential Suite".

He has composed more than 300 original works, including commissions by Jazz at Lincoln Center, ASCAP, Scranton University, and Music Institute of Chicago.

He has also served on the faculties of Florida A&M University, University of New Orleans, Loyola University of New Orleans, and Xavier University of Louisiana. Goines is an artist for Yamaha Corporation and Vandoren.

== Discography ==
=== As Leader ===
- "Genesis" (AFO, 1992)
- "Joe's Blues" (Rosemary Joseph Records, 1998)
- "To Those We Love So Dearly" (Rosemary Joseph Records, 1999)
- "Sunrise To Midnight" (Rosemary Joseph Records, 2000)
- "New Adventures" (Criss Cross Records, 2006)
- "Love Dance" (Criss Cross Records, 2007)
- "Pastels in Ballads and Blues" (Rosemary Joseph Records, 2007)
- "Twilight" (Rosemary Joseph Records, 2012)
- "Morning Swing" (Rosemary Joseph Records, 2013)
- "A Dance At The Mardi Gras Ball" (Rosemary Joseph Records, 2016)
- "The Woodlawn Suite" (Rosemary Joseph Records, 2023)

=== Collaborations ===
with Janio Abreu

- Nuestra Herencia Musical (En Vivo) (2018)
- Juntos Otra Vez (En Vivo) (2020)
- Janio Abreu y Aire de Concierto, Victor Goines & Orquesta de Camara de la Habana (En Vivo) (2022)

=== As Sideman ===
With Wynton Marsalis Septet

- "In This House, On This Morning" (Columbia, 1994)
- "Joe Cool's Blues ("Columbia, 1995)
- "The Marciac Suite" (Columbia, 1999)
- "Standard Time, Vol. 4: Marsalis Plays Monk" (Columbia, 1999)
- "Standard Time Vol. 6: Mr. Jelly Lord" (Columbia, 1999)
- "Reeltime" (Sony Classical, 1999)
- "Wynton Marsalis: The London Concert" (Columbia, 2000)
- "Unforgiveable Blackness: The Rise and Fall of Jack Johnson" (Blue Note, 2004)
- "The War" (2007)

With The Jazz At Lincoln Center Orchestra

- "Portraits by Ellington" (Columbia, 1992)
- "The Fire of the Fundamentals" (Columbia, 1993)
- "They Came to Swing" (Columbia, 1994)
- "Blood on the Fields" (Columbia, 1997)
- "Jump Start and Jazz" (Columbia, 1997)
- "Live in Swing City" (Columbia, 1999)
- Sweet Release & Ghost Story (Columbia, 1999)
- "Big Train" (Columbia/Sony Classical, 1999)
- "All Rise" (Sony Classical, 2002)
- "A Love Supreme" (Palmetto Records, 2005)
- "Higher Ground: Hurricane Relief Benefit Concert" (Blue Note Records, 2005)
- "Don't Be Afraid…The Music of Charles Mingus "(Palmetto Records, 2005)""
- "Congo Square" (Jazz at Lincoln Center, 2007)
- "Portraits in Seven Shades" (The Orchard, 2010)
- "Vitoria Suite" (EmArcy Records, 2010)
- "Live in Cuba" (Blue Engine Records, 2015)
- "Big Band Holidays (Blue Engine Records, 2015)"
- "The Abyssinian Mass" (Blue Engine Records, 2016)
- "The Music of John Lewis" (Blue Engine Records, 2017)
- "Handful of Keys" (Blue Engine Records, 2017)

With Ruth Brown

- "Fine and Mellow" (Fantasy Records, 1992)
- R + B = Ruth Brown (Bullseye Blues, 1997)
- "A Good Day for the Blues" (Bullseye Blues, 1999)
