= Marcus Printup =

American jazz trumpeter (born 1967)

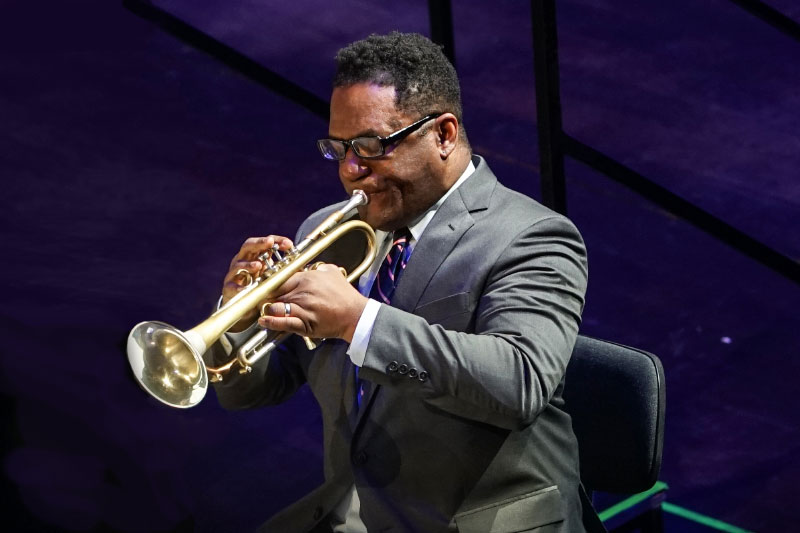
- Marcus Printup playing with Jazz at Lincoln Center Orchestra in Denmark (Aalborg 2020)

Background information
- Born: Marcus Edward Printup; January 24, 1967 (age 59); Conyers, Georgia
- Genres: Jazz
- Occupation: Musician
- Instrument: Trumpet
- Years active: 1990s–present
- Labels: Blue Note, SteepleChase
- Member of: Jazz at Lincoln Center Orchestra
- Website: marcusprintup.net

Marcus Edward Printup (born January 24, 1967) is an American jazz trumpeter who attended the University of North Florida Jazz Studies program and went on to work with Betty Carter, Wynton Marsalis, The Clayton-Hamilton Jazz Orchestra, and Tim Hagans. In 1993, he became a member of the Jazz at Lincoln Center Orchestra led by Wynton Marsalis.

== Discography ==
- Song for the Beautiful Woman (Blue Note, 1995)
- Unveiled (Blue Note, 1996)
- Nocturnal Traces (Blue Note, 1998)
- Hubsongs (Blue Note, 1998)
- The New Boogaloo (Nagel Heyer, 2002)
- Peace in the Abstract (SteepleChase, 2006)
- Bird of Paradise (SteepleChase, 2007)
- London Lullaby (SteepleChase, 2009)
- Ballads All Night (SteepleChase, 2010)
- A Time for Love (SteepleChase, 2011)
- Homage (SteepleChase, 2012)
- Desire (SteepleChase, 2013)
- Lost (SteepleChase, 2014)
- Young Bloods (SteepleChase, 2015)
