= Gerry Wright =

Canadian biochemist

- Gerard D. Wright
- Education: University of Waterloo (BSc 1986, PhD 1990)
- Known for: Antibiotic research
- Scientific career
- Fields: Biochemistry
- Workplaces: McMaster University
- Thesis: Investigation of the lanosterol 14[alpha]-demethylase (P-450_{14}DM) from Saccharomyces cerevisiae (1990)

Gerard D. Wright, PhD, FRSC, is a professor in the Department of Biochemistry and Biomedical Sciences, and Canada Research Chair in Antibiotic Biochemistry at McMaster University who studies chemical compounds that can combat antibiotic resistance in bacteria. He is also an Associate member of the Departments of Chemistry and Chemical Biology and Pathology and Molecular Medicine. Wright was Chair of the Department of Biochemistry and Biomedical Sciences from 2001 to 2007. He was the Director of McMaster's Michael G. DeGroote Institute for Infectious Disease Research from 2007 to 2022. He is currently the executive director of Canada's Global Nexus for Pandemics and Biological Threats. He is also founding director of the McMaster Antimicrobial Research Centre, and co-founder of the McMaster High Throughput Screening Facility.

Wright obtained his BSc in Biochemistry and his PhD in chemistry from the University of Waterloo. He did his post-doctoral training at Harvard Medical School before joining McMaster University in 1993.

Wright is a Fellow of the Royal Society of Canada and the American Academy of Microbiology. He currently serves as an associate editor of ACS Infectious Diseases, and he is a member of the editorial boards of Chemistry and Biology, The Journal of Antibiotics, Annals of the New York Academy of Sciences, and Antimicrobial Therapeutics Reviews.

Wright coined the term antibiotic resistome, which is used to describe the collection of all the antibiotic resistant genes and their precursors in both pathogenic and non-pathogenic bacteria.

In 2014, Wright was the senior author on a study in Nature which described the discovery that the previously known Aspergillomarasmine A was a new antibiotic.
