= Jeremy Wright (disambiguation) =

Jeremy Wright (born 1972) is an English politician.

Jeremy Wright may also refer to:

- Jeremy Wright (actor) in Adoration (film)
- Jeremy Wright, running back in 2011 Louisville Cardinals football team
- Jeremy Wright, musician in The Sundance Kids

== See also ==
- Jerry Wright (disambiguation)
