= Jazz at Lincoln Center =

American nonprofit organization

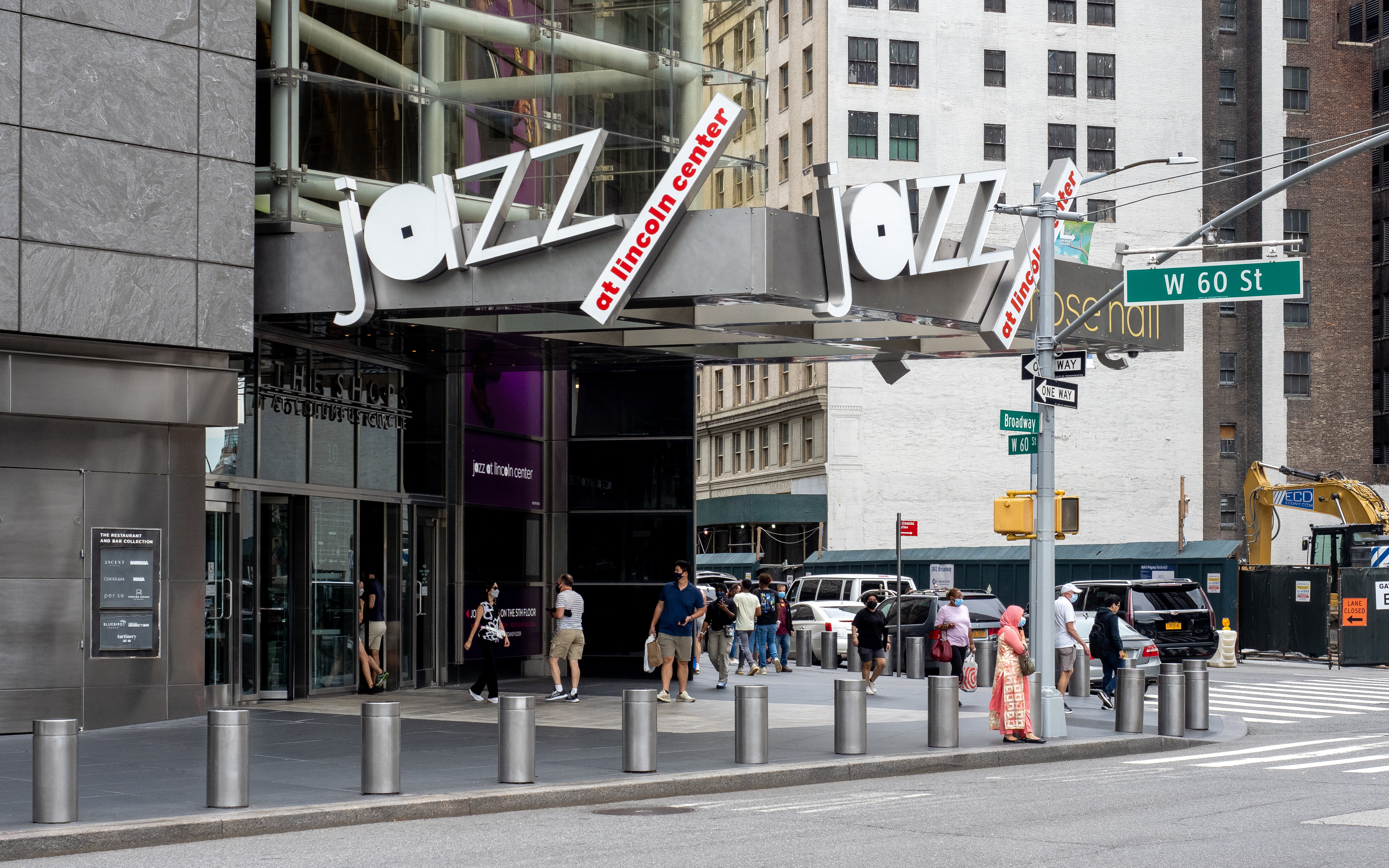
- Sign outside Jazz at Lincoln Center
- Interactive map of Jazz at Lincoln Center
- Address: Broadway at 60th Street
- Location: New York City
- Coordinates: 40°46′9″N 73°58′59″W
- Owner: Lincoln Center for the Performing Arts
- Capacity: Rose Theater: 1,233; The Appel Room: 483; Dizzy's Club: 140
- Event: Jazz
- Public transit: New York City Subway: 59th Street–Columbus Circle ( trains); New York City Bus: M7, M10, M11, M20, M66, M104

Construction
- Built: 2004

Website
- www.jazz.org

Jazz at Lincoln Center (JALC) is an organization based in New York City. Part of Lincoln Center, the organization was founded in 1987 and opened at Time Warner Center (now Deutsche Bank Center) in October 2004. The organization seeks to "represent the totality of jazz music – educationally, curatorially, archivally, and ceremonially." They advocate for jazz, culture, and arts education globally. Wynton Marsalis is the artistic director and the leader of the Jazz at Lincoln Center Orchestra.

The center hosts performances by the orchestra and by visiting musicians. It is home to the New York City Opera. Many concerts are streamed live on the center's YouTube channel. The center also presents educational programs in its home buildings, online, and in schools throughout the country.

The organization reaches approximately 3 million people of all ages every year through concerts (where more than 90 percent of seats for major shows are sold), tours, musical instruction programs, sheet music, recordings on their label (Blue Engine), and live performances on their platform JAZZ LIVE.

The center has large speakers throughout the building that routinely play the music of great jazz artists including Ella Fitzgerald, Dizzy Gillespie, and Louis Armstrong.

== History ==
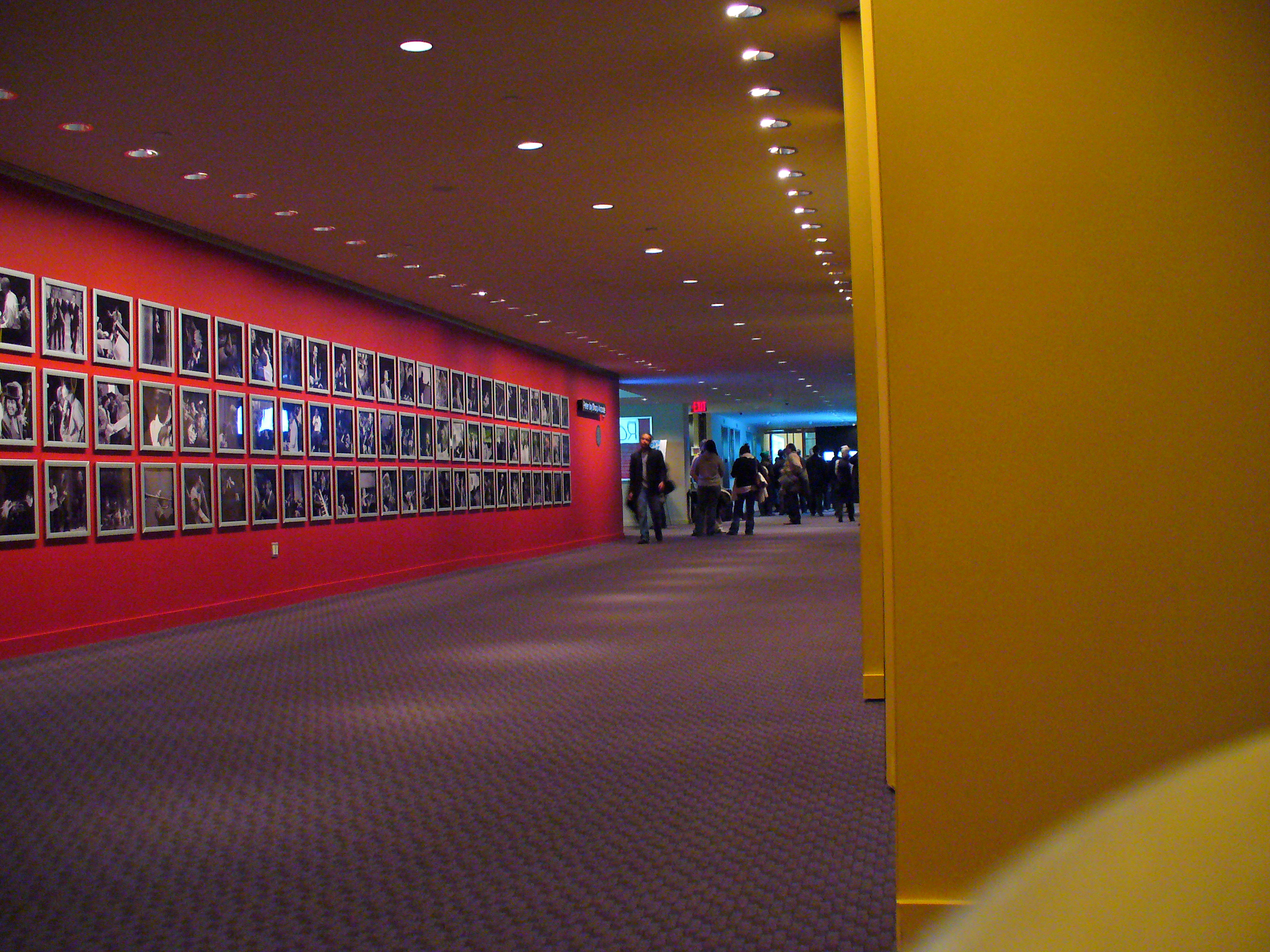
Peter Jay Sharp arcade, 2007

During the mid-1980s, the Lincoln Center sought to attract new and younger audiences. The space wasn't used during the summer and the organization wanted to find ways to fill the halls while resident companies performed elsewhere. Jazz enthusiasts on the Lincoln Center campus fought for jazz to be recognized by the organization. In a 1986 report the organization said, "Lincoln Center should focus on excellence in its course offering and that no compelling case can be made for adding a constituent in an area like jazz." This was after the third proposal from then director of visitor services, Alina Bloomgarden, to introduce a permanent jazz program to the Lincoln Center. It was believed that jazz audiences would be too rowdy. Bloomgarden then decided to invite Wynton Marsalis to help her plan a summer concert series. In order to succeed, this concert series had to show commercial viability and merits of both the music and community it came from.

In 1987, trumpeter Wynton Marsalis was involved in starting the Classical Jazz concert series, the first series of jazz concerts at Lincoln Center. The concert series began in August 1987 and they celebrated women in jazz. This included Betty Carter, Sasha Dalton, Marian McPartland, and others. Given the high stakes, success of this concert series was pertinent. At this point in time, many great jazz innovators had died, jazz clubs were shutting down, not many colleges and universities had jazz programs, and there was a rise in commercial aspirations with electronic music. It was also a polarizing time in the United States with many places still being racially integrated, the AIDS epidemic, boost in militarization and globalization with the Cold War, and Ronald Reagan's war on drugs increasing mass incarceration. By their second year, they had their own radio services on the National Public Radio and began touring.

A sense of what Marsalis was saving was recorded in this three part suite, The New Orleans Function, which was styled after New Orleans funeral marches. Stanley Crouch, who was involved in founding Jazz at Lincoln Center, wrote an impassioned oration that was delivered by Reverend Jeremy Wright. This sermon is read as a statement of purpose for what Jazz at Lincoln Center would become:

"It is possible that we who listened heard something timeless from those who are the descendants of the many who were literally up for sale—those whose presence on the auction blocks and in the slave quarters formed the cross upon which the Constitution of this nation was crucified. Yet—even after that crucifixion, there were those who rose in the third century of American slavery with a vision of freedom ... There were those who lit the mighty wick that extended from the candle—and carried it. There were those who spoke through music of the meaning of light—those who were not content to accept the darkness in the heart that comes when you surrender to dragons who think themselves grand. There were those who said, 'Listen closely, now'—those who said, 'If you give me a fair chance, I will help you better understand the meaning of democracy.' Yes—that is precisely what they said. 'If you give me a fair chance, I will help you better understand the meaning of democracy.' These are they who were truly the makers of a noble sound."

Gordon Davis, a member of the Lincoln Center Board and founding chair, saw the success of the summer concert series and advocated for a permanent jazz program. The board agreed and by 1996, Jazz at Lincoln Center was elevated to full constituency along with the New York Philharmonic, City Ballet, Metropolitan Opera, and houses dedicated to European Arts. The budget for Jazz at Lincoln Center was $4 million in 1996, compared to $150 million for the Metropolitan Opera. In 2016, its budget was over $50 million. Wynton Marsalis has been artistic director since 1987. Greg Scholl became executive director in 2012.

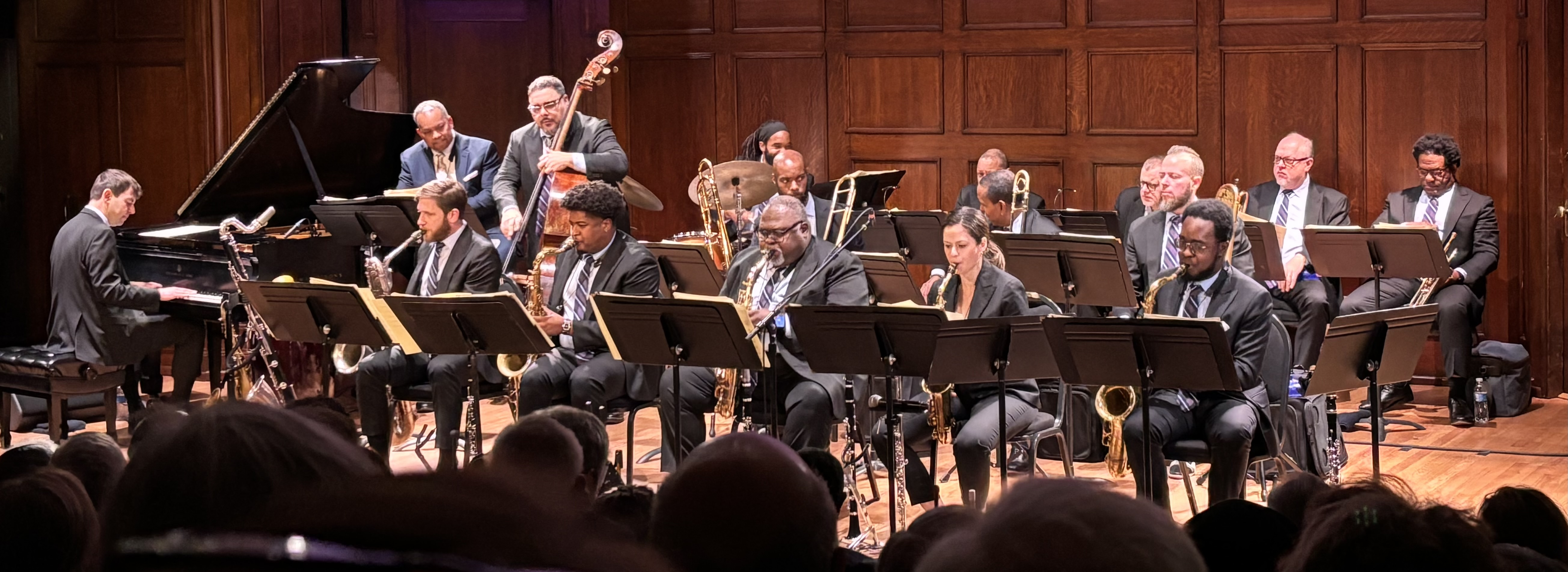
The Jazz at Lincoln Center Orchestra at The Sheldon in St. Louis, MO, in January 2026

Marsalis leads the Jazz at Lincoln Center Orchestra, which performs in the Appel Room and the Rose Theater in addition to extensive international tours. Concerts are also broadcast live online. Educational programs are broadcast on the center's YouTube channel. Since 2015, the orchestra's albums have been issued on its own label, Blue Engine Records.

Under the education curation of Todd Stoll, Jazz at Lincoln Center distributes jazz curricula to high schools through its Essentially Ellington program. Professional musicians visit schools through the Let Freedom Swing program. The center runs a Middle School Jazz Academy, a High School Jazz Academy, and a Summer Academy, all in New York City, all of them with free tuition. Every year the orchestra tours and visits schools throughout the U.S. The Essentially Ellington High School Jazz Band Competition and Festival takes place every year at Jazz at Lincoln Center.

In January 2026, Marsalis announced he would step down from his role as artistic director in July 2027, then serving as an advisor through June 2028. Marsalis stated in an interview, "It's the perfect time to identify the next generation of leadership ... We want to make sure that we do what we can to nurture what we've already built with the understanding that this is an art form and it will continue to grow and the organization will continue to flourish." However, he will continue to perform on occasion with the Jazz at Lincoln Center Orchestra.

== Rose Hall ==
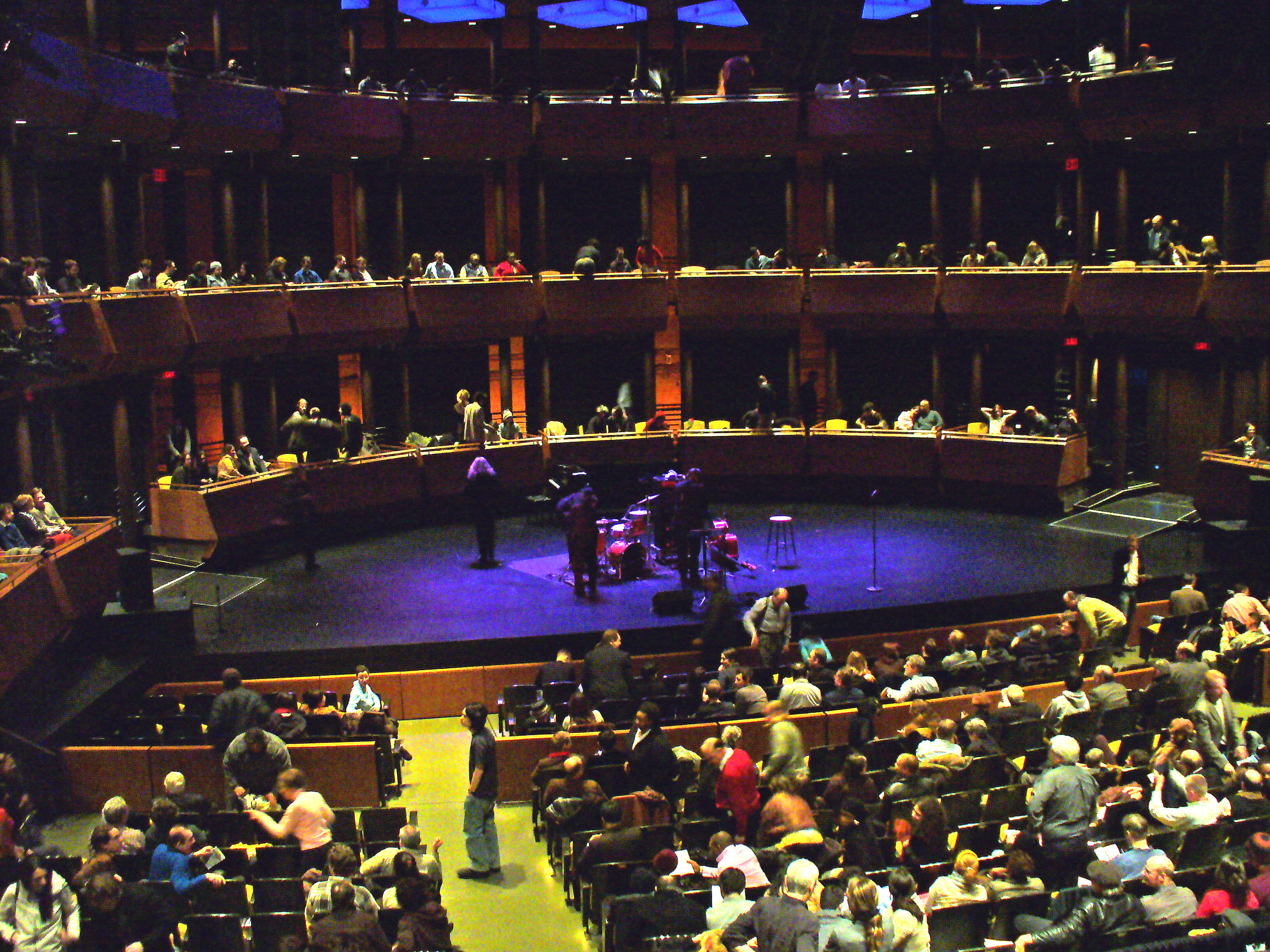
Rose Theater, 2007

Buildings of Lincoln Center
Buildings and structures in Lincoln Center:
1 Samuel B. and David Rose Building (includes Walter Reade Theater)
2 Juilliard School
3 Alice Tully Hall
4 Vivian Beaumont Theater (includes Mitzi E. Newhouse Theater and Claire Tow Theater)
5 Elinor Bunin Monroe Film Center
6 David Geffen Hall
7 New York Public Library for the Performing Arts (includes Bruno Walter Auditorium)
8 Metropolitan Opera House
9 Josie Robertson Plaza with Revson Fountain
10 Damrosch Park
11 David H. Koch Theater
12 David Rubenstein Atrium
13 Jazz at Lincoln Center

The performing arts complex, Frederick P. Rose Hall, was designed by Rafael Viñoly and is located on the fifth floor of Deutsche Bank Center (originally Time Warner Center). The $131 million facility opened in fall 2004 and was the world's first performance, education, and broadcast facility entirely devoted to jazz. It was engineered specifically for the warmth and clarity of jazz. Rose Hall consists of three venues: Rose Theater, The Appel Room, and Dizzy's Club, named after trumpeter Dizzy Gillespie. The Hall also contains the Irene Diamond Education Center with rehearsal and recording rooms. The location was criticized for being within a high-end shopping mall at Columbus Circle and isolated from the main Lincoln Center that was four blocks away. Jazz at Lincoln Center counteracted this by saying that this house of consumerism "showcases the music born from a freedom struggle, one that encourages both players and listeners to reach for higher ideals".

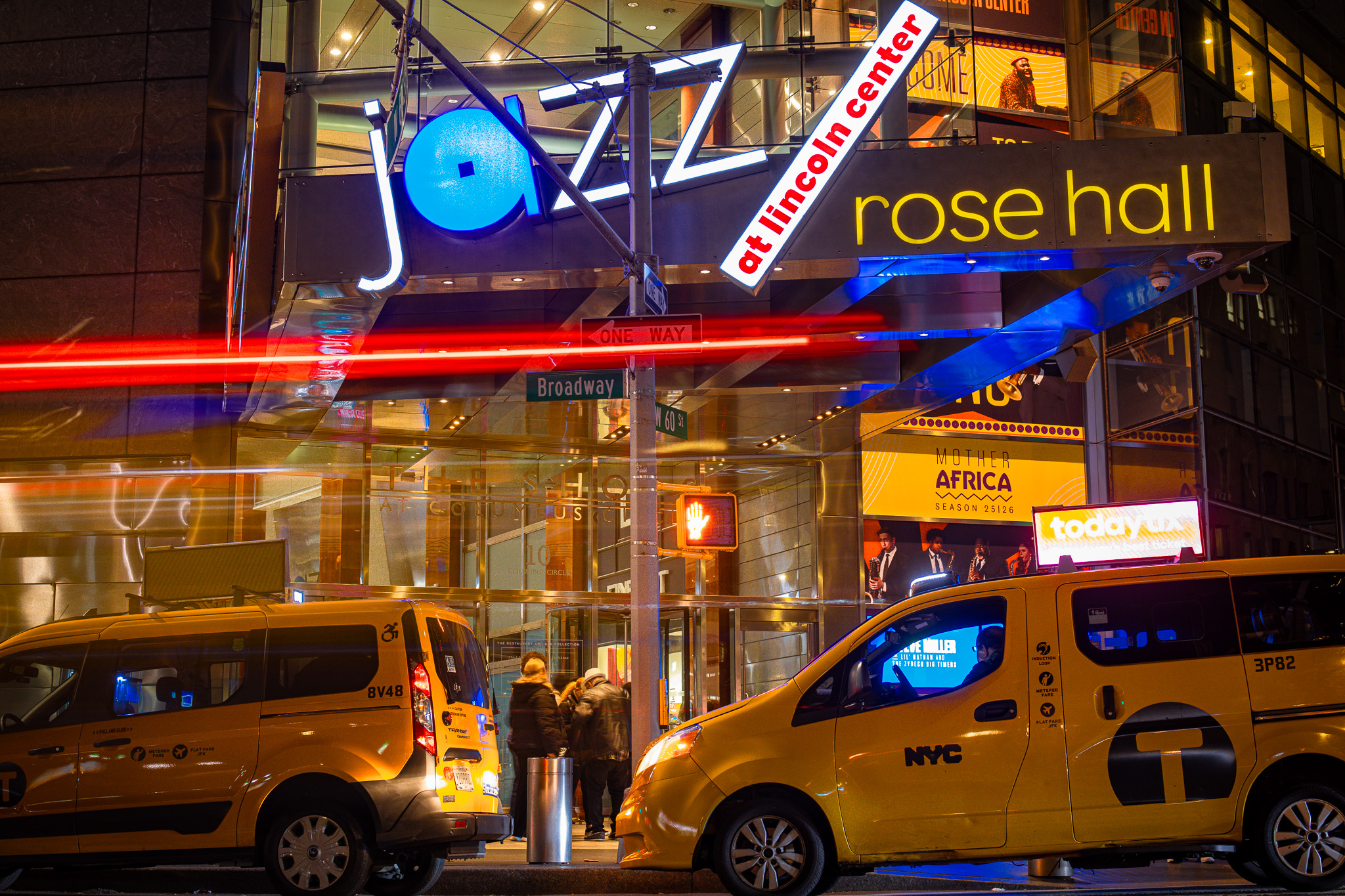
Jazz at Lincoln Center at night with Rose Hall signage, 2025

Leaders of Jazz at Lincoln Center undertook construction of a facility that had proper acoustics for swing and blues oriented jazz. They also wanted this facility to properly house the institution's educational and archival pursuits. To start gaining traction, Marsalis collaborated with popular musicians outside of jazz, including Stevie Wonder, Paul Simon, and Bob Dylan. Not only did this bring in a larger audience, it also allowed for performances with rich tension between swing, rock, and R&B.

Rose Theater has a "floating box-in-box construction" that has no rigid structural connections to Jazz at Lincoln Center's other performance halls. The venue has 1,233 seats and is adaptable for opera, dance, theater, film, and orchestral performances. In order to minimize outside noise and to remain both quiet and intimate, the space sits on rubber isolation pads. In order to maintain adaptability, Rose Hall has moveable seating towers that can be put into concert mode and theater mode. When in concert mode, seats are behind and around the musicians to serve as an acoustical and visual function. This also allows for more seating at concerts. When in theater mode, the towers are stored in an air caster system. This allows for a platform when opera, ballet, or modern dance require scenic elements.

The Appel Room contains 583 seats with an informal and intimate setting. The room normally has seven separate seating levels, but it can be converted into four to accommodate for dancing and mobility. The room has a 50 foot high glass wall that overlooks Central Park. This wall is angled slightly upward, allowing for sound to be reflected from the atrium and stage monitors directly into the ceiling. Panels are hung from the ceiling and catwalks to diffuse and absorb sound.

Dizzy's Club, named after American jazz trumpeter Dizzy Gillespie and sponsored by Coca-Cola, contains 140 seats and was designed as an intimate jazz club for live trios, pianists, and vocalists. The room has a city view of Columbus Circle and Central Park. It was designed to have a "golden" sound to encourage artist-audience interaction (similar to early New York City jazz clubs).

== Reception ==
Since Jazz at Lincoln Center's inception, critics have accused Wynton Marsalis of being an elitist who hasn't embraced diversity and has failed to foster music experimentation. Pianist Matthew Shipp wrote an article in 1998 criticizing the center. He said that rather than fostering a performance space, the center institutionalized jazz and created an environment where music goes to die. By institutionalizing jazz, Shipp claimed that something illegitimate becomes legitimate, which takes away from the spirit of jazz.

Others claimed that Marsalis would "return artistic seriousness and market viability to a genre that had lost its way… [and] radiated a brashness that all but dared critics to reject the savior mythology."

== Hall of Fame ==
The Nesuhi Ertegun Jazz Hall of Fame is named for Nesuhi Ertegun, co-founder of Atlantic Records. A 60-person international voting panel, which includes musicians, scholars and educators from 17 countries, is charged to nominate and select "the most definitive artists in the history of jazz for induction into the Hall of Fame".

Inductees have included:

2004

- Louis Armstrong (1901–1971), trumpeter
- Sidney Bechet (1897–1959), saxophonist, clarinetist
- Bix Beiderbecke (1903–1931), cornetist
- John Coltrane (1926–1967), saxophonist
- Miles Davis (1926–1991), trumpeter
- Duke Ellington (1899–1974), pianist
- Dizzy Gillespie (1917–1993), trumpeter
- Coleman Hawkins (1904–1969), saxophonist
- Billie Holiday (1915–1959), vocalist
- Thelonious Monk (1917–1982), pianist
- Jelly Roll Morton (1890–1941), pianist
- Charlie Parker (1920–1955), saxophonist
- Art Tatum (1909–1956), pianist
- Lester Young (1909–1959), saxophonist

2005

- Count Basie (1904–1984), pianist, organist, bandleader
- Roy Eldridge (1911–1989), trumpeter
- Ella Fitzgerald (1917–1996), vocalist
- Benny Goodman (1909–1986), clarinetist
- Earl Hines (1903–1983), pianist
- Johnny Hodges (1907–1970), saxophonist
- "Papa" Jo Jones (1911–1985), drummer
- Charles Mingus (1922–1979), bassist
- Joe "King" Oliver (1885–1938), cornetist
- Max Roach (1924–2007), drummer
- Sonny Rollins (1930–2026), saxophonist
- Fats Waller (1904–1943), pianist, organist

2007

- Clifford Brown (1930–1956), trumpeter
- Benny Carter (1907–2003), saxophonist, clarinetist, trumpeter
- Charlie Christian (1916–1942), guitarist
- Django Reinhardt (1910–1953), guitarist

2008

- Ornette Coleman (1930–2015), free jazz pioneer
- Gil Evans (1912–1988), jazz arranger
- Bessie Smith (1894–1937), blues singer
- Mary Lou Williams (1910–1981), pianist, arranger

2010

- Bill Evans (1929–1980), pianist, composer
- Bud Powell (1924–1966), pianist
- Billy Strayhorn (1915–1967), composer, pianist, lyricist, arranger
- Sarah Vaughan (1924–1990), vocalist

2013

- Art Blakey (1919–1990), drummer, bandleader
- Lionel Hampton (1908–2002), vibraphonist, pianist, percussionist, bandleader
- Clark Terry (1920–2015), flugelhornist, trumpeter

2014

- Betty Carter (1929–1998), vocalist
- Fletcher Henderson (1897–1952), pianist, bandleader, arranger, composer
- Elvin Jones (1927–2004), drummer
- Wes Montgomery (1923–1968), guitarist

2015

- Dexter Gordon (1923–1990), saxophonist, composer, bandleader
- James P. Johnson (1894–1955), pianist, composer
- Lennie Tristano (1919–1978), pianist, composer, arranger

2016

- J. J. Johnson (1924–2001), trombonist, composer, arranger
- Wayne Shorter (1933–2023), saxophonist, composer, bandleader
- Ben Webster (1909–1973), saxophonist

2017

- Tito Puente (1923–2000), songwriter, bandleader, percussionist, producer
- Don Redman (1900–1964), clarinetist, saxophonist, arranger, bandleader, composer
- McCoy Tyner (1938–2020), pianist, composer

2018

- Jimmy Blanton (1918–1942), double bassist
- Nat King Cole (1919–1965), singer, pianist
- Nina Simone (1933–2003), singer, songwriter, pianist

2019

- Julian "Cannonball" Adderley (1928–1975), saxophonist
- Frankie Trumbauer (1901–1956), saxophonist
- Dinah Washington (1924–1963), singer, pianist
- Chick Webb (1905–1939), drummer, band leader

2020

- Freddie Green (1911–1987), guitarist
- Lee Konitz (1927–2020), saxophonist, composer
- John Lewis (1920–2001), pianist, composer, arranger
- Teddy Wilson (1912–1986), pianist

2022

- Freddie Hubbard (1938–2008), trumpeter
- Paul Chambers (1935–1969), double bassist

2023

- Antônio Carlos Jobim (1927–1994), composer, pianist, guitarist, arranger, singer
- Hugh Masekela (1939–2018), trumpeter, flugelhornist, singer, composer
- Mario Bauzá (1911–1993), composer, arranger, clarinetist, saxophonist, trumpeter
- Toshiko Akiyoshi (b. 1929), pianist, composer, arranger, bandleader

2024

- Dave Brubeck (1920–2012), pianist, composer
- Kenny Clarke (1914–1985), drummer, bandleader
- Lou Donaldson (1926–2024), saxophonist, bandleader, composer
- Kenny Dorham (1924–1972), trumpeter, composer
- Roy Haynes (1925–2024), drummer, bandleader
- Sheila Jordan (1928–2025), singer, songwriter
- Eddie Palmieri (1936–2025), pianist, bandleader, composer

2025

- Tadd Dameron (1917–1965), composer, arranger, pianist
- Joe Henderson (1937–2001), saxophonist, composer
- Thad Jones (1923–1986), trumpeter, composer, bandleader
- Abbey Lincoln (1930–2010), vocalist, songwriter
- Melba Liston (1926–1999), trombonist, arranger, composer
- Horace Silver (1928–2014), pianist, composer, arranger

== See also ==
- Wynton Marsalis
- Jazz at Lincoln Center Orchestra
