= Marc Chagall =

Russian and French artist (1887–1985)

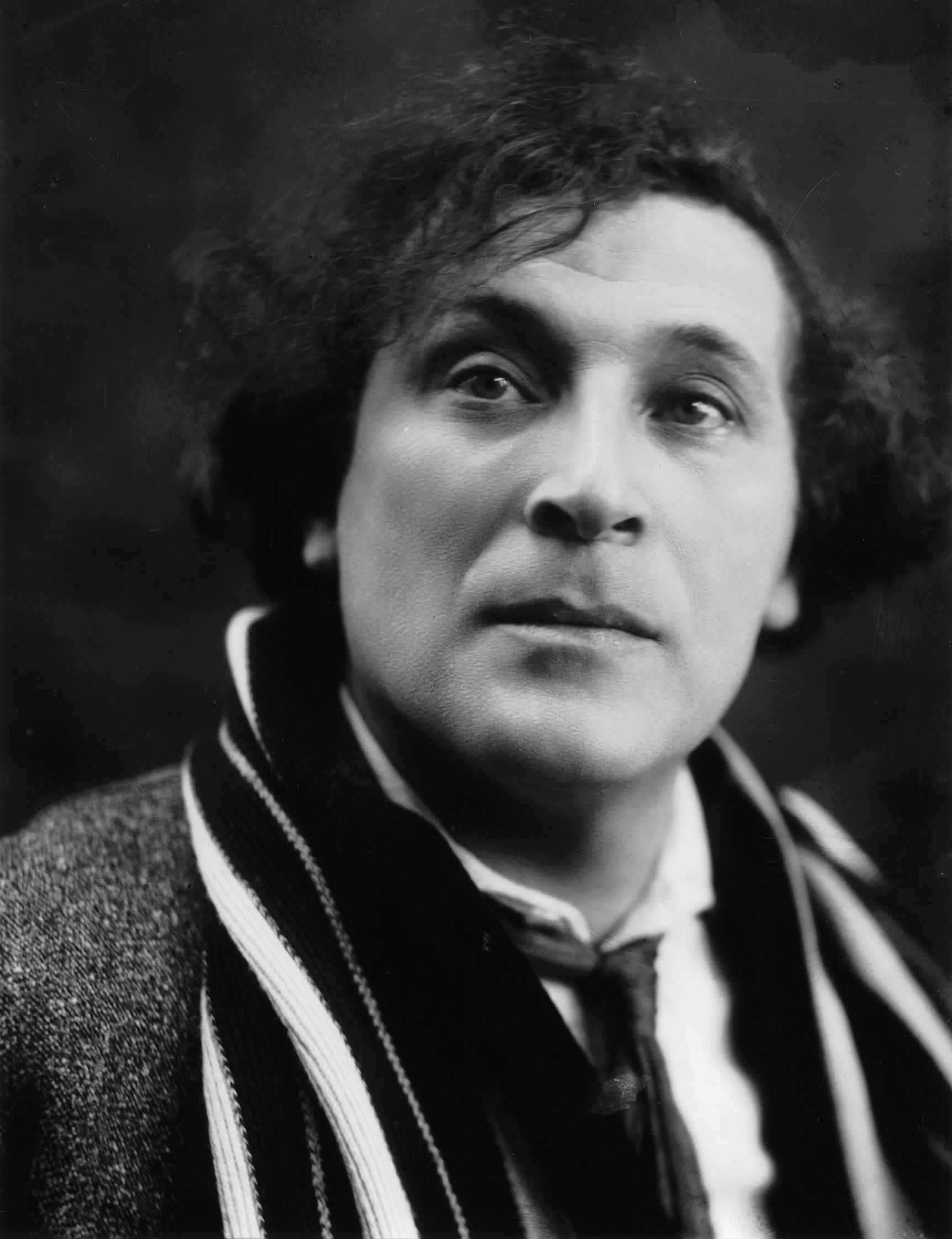
- Chagall, c. 1920
- Born: Moishe Shagal; 6 July 1887; Liozno, Russian Empire
- Died: 28 March 1985 (aged 97); Saint-Paul-de-Vence, France
- Citizenship: Russian, later French
- Known for: Painting; stained glass
- Notable work: See list of artworks by Marc Chagall
- Movement: Expressionism; School of Paris
- Spouses: Bella Rosenfeld (m. 1915; died 1944); Valentina (Vava) Brodsky (m. 1952)
- Children: 2
- Website: marcchagall.com

Signature
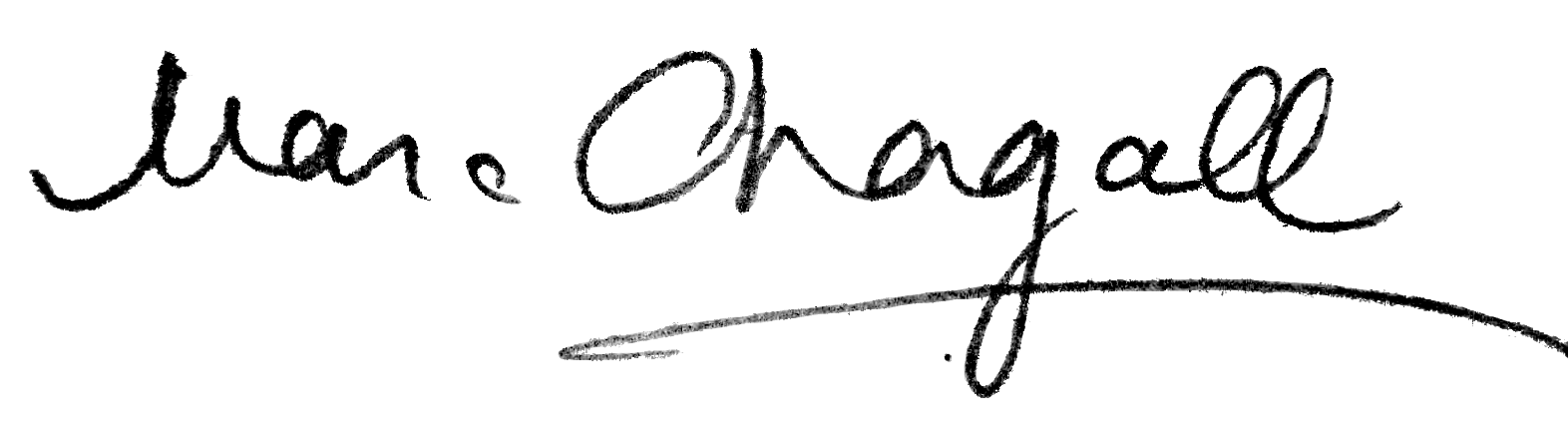

Marc Chagall (Note: UK: /ʃæˈɡæl/ sha-GAL, US: /ʃəˈɡɑːl, ʃəˈɡæl/ shə-GA(H)L; French: [maʁk ʃaɡal]; Yiddish: מאַרק זאַכאַראָוויטש שאַגאַל; Russian: Марк Захарович Шагал, romanized: Mark Zakharovich Shagal [ˈmark ʂɐˈɡal]; Belarusian: Марк Захаравіч Шагал [ˈmark ʂaˈɣal].) (born Moishe Shagal; 6 July [O.S. 24 June] 1887 (Note: Most sources uncritically repeat the information that he was born on 7 July 1887, without specifying whether this was a Gregorian or Julian date. However, this date is incorrect. He was born on 24 June 1887 under the then Julian calendar, which translates to 6 July 1887 in the Gregorian calendar, the gap between the calendars in 1887 being 12 days. Chagall himself miscalculated the Gregorian date when he arrived in Paris in 1910, using the then-current 13-day gap, not realising that applied to births that occurred only from 1900 onwards.) – 28 March 1985) was a Russian and French artist of Jewish ancestry. (Note: Chagall described himself as Russian. Chagall's contemporaries, such as Ilya Ehrenburg, Ambroise Vollard, Guillaume Apollinaire, and Boris Aronson, considered him Russian as well. However, as he was born in what is now Belarus, Chagall was sometimes described contemporarily as being from the "Belorussian city of Vitebsk", or particularly representing "Belarusian shtetls" in his artwork. Some modern sources, such as the Musée Marc Chagall, also underscore Chagall's connection to Belarus.) An early modernist, he was associated with the École de Paris, as well as several major artistic styles and created works in a wide range of artistic formats, including painting, drawings, book illustrations, stained glass, stage sets, ceramics, tapestries and fine art prints.

Chagall was born in 1887, into a Jewish family near Vitebsk, today in Belarus, but at that time in the Pale of Settlement of the Russian Empire. Before World War I, he travelled between Saint Petersburg, Paris, and Berlin. During that period, he created his own mixture and style of modern art, based on his ideas of Eastern European and Jewish folklore. He spent the wartime years in Vitebsk and Petrograd, becoming one of the Russia's most distinguished artists and a member of the modernist avant-garde, founding the Vitebsk Museum of Modern Art and People's Art School. He later worked in and near Moscow in difficult conditions during hard times in Russia following the Bolshevik Revolution, before leaving again for Paris in 1923. During World War II, he escaped occupied France to the United States, where he lived in New York City for seven years before returning to France in 1948.

Art critic Robert Hughes referred to Chagall as "the quintessential Jewish artist of the twentieth century." According to art historian Michael J. Lewis, Chagall was considered to be "the last survivor of the first generation of European modernists.” For decades, he "had also been respected as the world's pre-eminent Jewish artist.” Using the medium of stained glass, he produced windows for the cathedrals of Reims and Metz as well as the Fraumünster in Zürich, windows for the UN and the Art Institute of Chicago and the Jerusalem Windows in Israel. He also did large-scale paintings, including part of the ceiling of the Paris Opéra. He experienced modernism's "golden age" in Paris, where "he synthesized the art forms of Cubism, Symbolism, and Fauvism, and the influence of Fauvism gave rise to Surrealism". Yet throughout these phases of his style he remained "most emphatically a Jewish artist, whose work was one long dreamy reverie of life in his native Vitebsk." "When Matisse dies,” Pablo Picasso remarked in the 1950s, "Chagall will be the only painter left who understands what colour really is.”

== Early life and education ==
=== Early life ===
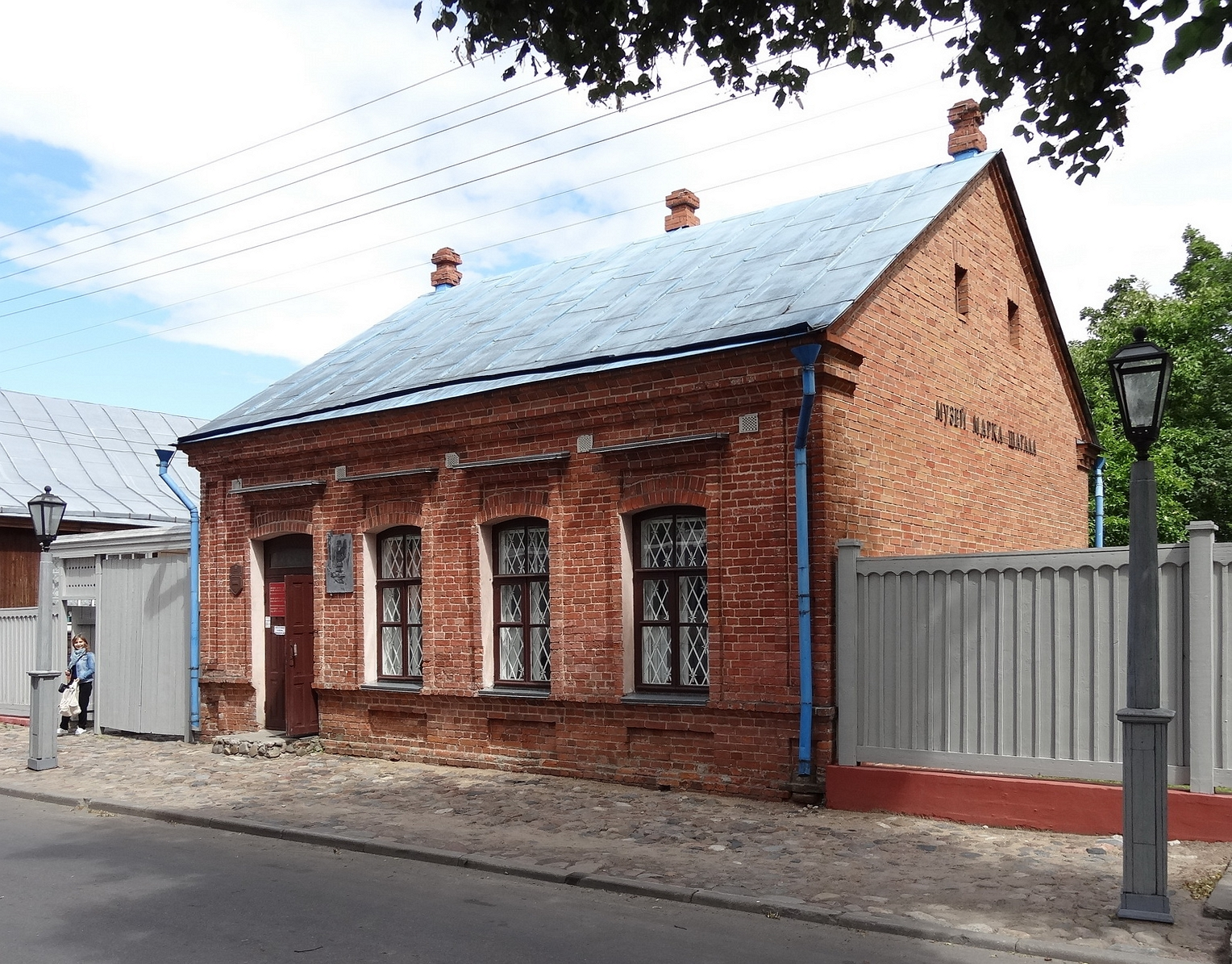
Marc Chagall's childhood home in Vitebsk, Belarus. Currently site of the Marc Chagall Museum.

Marc Chagall, 1912, The Spoonful of Milk (La Cuillerée de lait), gouache on paper

Marc Chagall was born Moishe Shagal on 6 July 1887 into a Jewish family in Liozno, near the city of Vitebsk in the Russian Empire (present-day Belarus), or in Vitebsk. At the time of his birth, Vitebsk's population was about 66,000. More than half of the town dwellers were Jewish. A picturesque city of churches and synagogues, it was called the "Russian Toledo" by artist Ilya Repin, after the cosmopolitan city of the former Spanish Empire. Because the city was built mostly of wood, little of it survived years of occupation and destruction during World War II.

Chagall was the eldest of nine children. The family name, Shagal, is a variant of the name Segal, which in a Jewish community was usually borne by a Levitic family. His father, Khatskl (Zachar) Shagal, was employed by a herring merchant, and his mother, Feige-Ite, sold groceries from their home. His father worked hard, carrying heavy barrels, earning 20 roubles each month (the average wages across the Russian Empire was 13 roubles a month). Chagall wrote of those early years:

Day after day, winter and summer, at six o'clock in the morning, my father got up and went off to the synagogue. There he said his usual prayer for some dead man or other. On his return he made ready the samovar, drank some tea and went to work. Hellish work, the work of a galley-slave. Why try to hide it? How tell about it? No word will ever ease my father's lot... There was always plenty of butter and cheese on our table. Buttered bread, like an eternal symbol, was never out of my childish hands.

One of the main sources of income for the Jewish population of the town was from the manufacture of clothing that was sold throughout the Russian Empire. They also made furniture and various agricultural tools. From the late 18th century to the First World War, the Imperial Russian government confined Jews to living within the Pale of Settlement, which included modern Ukraine, Belarus, Poland, Lithuania, and Latvia, almost exactly corresponding to the territory of the Polish-Lithuanian Commonwealth which was taken over by Imperial Russia in the late 18th century. That led to the creation of Jewish market-villages (shtetls) throughout today's Eastern Europe, with their own markets, schools, hospitals, and other community institutions.

Chagall wrote as a boy: "I felt at every step that I was a Jew—people made me feel it". During a pogrom, Chagall wrote that: "The street lamps are out. I feel panicky, especially in front of butchers' windows. There you can see calves that are still alive lying beside the butchers' hatchets and knives". When asked by some pogromniks "Jew or not?", Chagall remembered thinking: "My pockets are empty, my fingers sensitive, my legs weak and they are out for blood. My death would be futile. I so wanted to live". Chagall denied being a Jew, leading the pogromniks to shout "All right! Get along!"

Most of what is known about Chagall's early life has come from his autobiography, My Life. In it, he described the major influence that the culture of Hasidic Judaism had on his life as an artist. Chagall related how he realised that the Jewish traditions in which he had grown up were fast disappearing and that he needed to document them. From the 1730s, Vitebsk itself had been a centre of that culture, with its teachings derived from the Kabbalah. Chagall scholar, Susan Tumarkin Goodman, describes the links and sources of his art to his early home:

Chagall's art can be understood as the response to a situation that has long marked the history of Russian Jews. Though they were cultural innovators who made important contributions to the broader society, Jews were considered outsiders in a frequently hostile society ... Chagall himself was born of a family steeped in religious life; his parents were observant Hasidic Jews who found spiritual satisfaction in a life defined by their faith and organized by prayer.

=== Art education ===
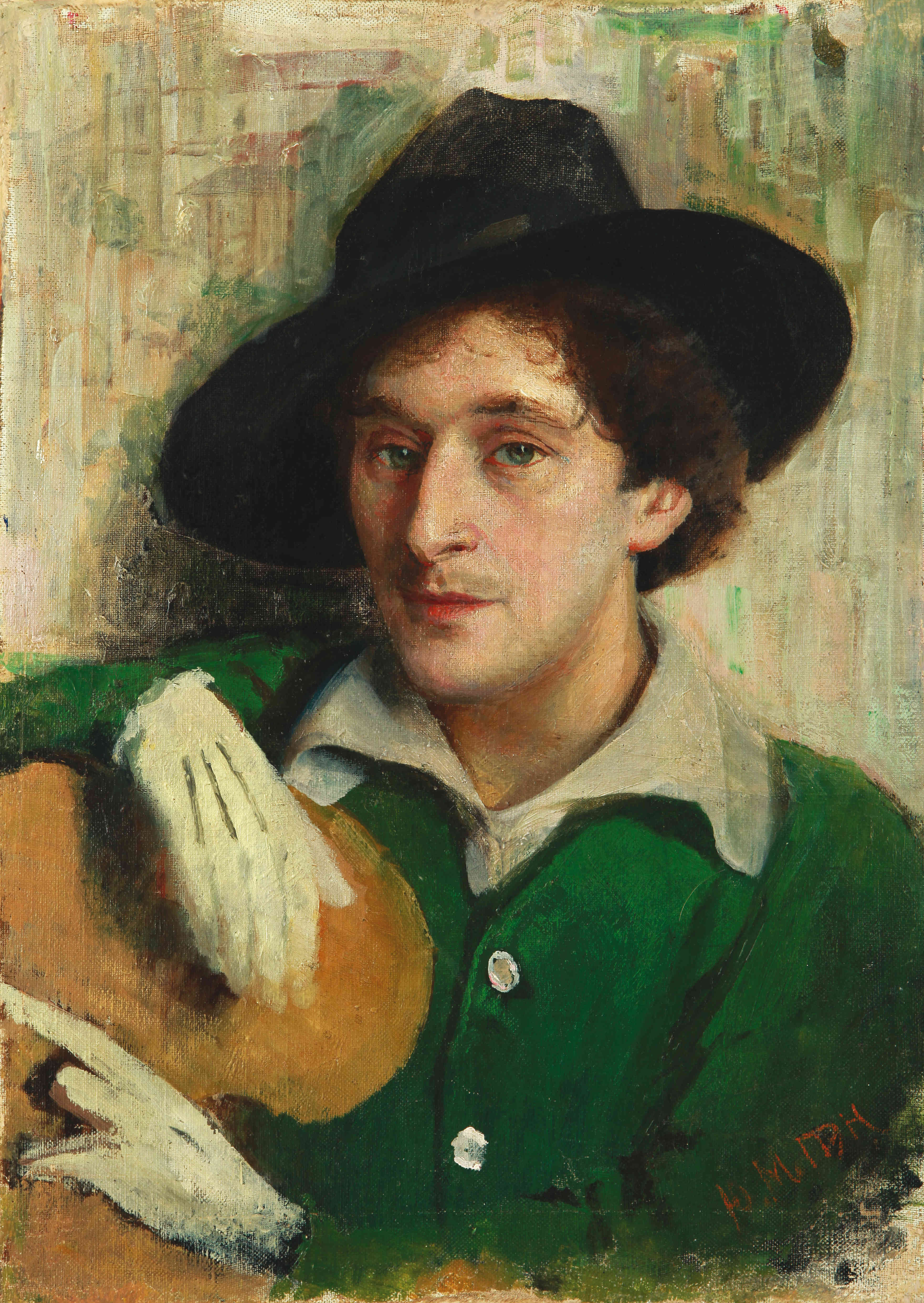
Portrait of Chagall by Yehuda Pen, his first art teacher in Vitebsk

In the Russian Empire at that time, Jewish children were not allowed to attend regular schools and universities imposed a quota on Jews. Their movement within the city was also restricted. Chagall therefore received his primary education at the local Jewish religious school, where he studied Hebrew and the Bible. At the age of 13, his mother tried to enroll him in a regular high school, and he recalled: "But in that school, they don't take Jews. Without a moment's hesitation, my courageous mother walks up to a professor." She offered the headmaster 50 roubles to let him attend, which he accepted.

A turning point of his artistic life came when he first noticed a fellow student drawing. Baal-Teshuva writes that, for the young Chagall, watching someone draw "was like a vision, a revelation in black and white." Chagall would later say that there was no art of any kind in his family's home and the concept was totally alien to him. When Chagall asked the schoolmate how he learned to draw, his friend replied, "Go and find a book in the library, idiot, choose any picture you like, and just copy it." He soon began copying images from books and found the experience so rewarding he then decided he wanted to become an artist.

Goodman writes that Chagall eventually confided to his mother, "I want to be a painter," although she could not yet understand his sudden interest in art or why he would choose a vocation that "seemed so impractical." The young Chagall explained: "There's a place in town; if I'm admitted and if I complete the course, I'll come out a regular artist. I'd be so happy!" It was 1906, and he had noticed the studio of Yehuda (Yuri) Pen, a realist artist who operated a drawing school in Vitebsk. At the same time, future artists El Lissitzky and Ossip Zadkine were also Pen's students. Due to Chagall's youth and lack of income, Pen offered to teach him free of charge. However, after a few months at the school, Chagall realized that academic portrait painting did not suit him.

=== Artistic inspiration ===
Marc Chagall, 1912, Calvary (Golgotha), oil on canvas, 174.6 × 192.4 cm, Museum of Modern Art, New York. Alternative titles: Kreuzigung Bild 2 Christus gewidmet [Golgotha. Crucifixion. Dedicated to Christ]. Sold through Galerie Der Sturm (Herwarth Walden), Berlin to Bernhard Koehler (1849–1927), Berlin, 1913. Exhibited: Erster Deutscher Herbstsalon, Berlin, 1913

Goodman notes that during that period in Imperial Russia, Jews had two ways to join the art world: one was to "hide or deny one's Jewish roots", the other—the one that Chagall chose—was "to cherish and publicly express one's Jewish roots" by integrating them into art. For Chagall, that was also his means of "self-assertion and an expression of principle".

Chagall biographer, Franz Meyer, explains that with the connections between his art and early life "the hassidic spirit is still the basis and source of nourishment for his art". Lewis adds: "As cosmopolitan an artist as he would later become, his storehouse of visual imagery would never expand beyond the landscape of his childhood, with its snowy streets, wooden houses, and ubiquitous fiddlers... [with] scenes of childhood so indelibly in one's mind and to invest them with an emotional charge so intense that it could only be discharged obliquely through an obsessive repetition of the same cryptic symbols and ideograms... "

Years later, at the age of 57, while living in the United States, Chagall confirmed that when he published an open letter entitled, "To My City Vitebsk":

Why? Why did I leave you many years ago? ... You thought, the boy seeks something, seeks such a special subtlety, that color descending like stars from the sky and landing, bright and transparent, like snow on our roofs. Where did he get it? How would it come to a boy like him? I don't know why he couldn't find it with us, in the city—in his homeland. Maybe the boy is "crazy", but "crazy" for the sake of art. ...You thought: "I can see, I am etched in the boy's heart, but he is still 'flying', he is still striving to take off, he has 'wind' in his head." ... I did not live with you, but I didn't have one single painting that didn't breathe with your spirit and reflection.

== Art career ==
=== Russian Empire (1906–1910) ===
In 1906, he moved to Saint Petersburg, which was then the capital of the Russian Empire and the center of the country's artistic life, with famous art schools. Since Jews were not permitted into the city without an internal passport, he managed to get a temporary passport from a friend. He enrolled in a prestigious art school and studied there for two years. By 1907, he had begun painting naturalistic self-portraits and landscapes. Chagall was an active member of the irregular freemasonic lodge, the Grand Orient of Russia's Peoples. He belonged to the "Vitebsk" lodge.

Between 1908 and 1910, Chagall was a student of Léon Bakst at the Zvantseva School of Drawing and Painting. While in Saint Petersburg, he discovered experimental theater, and the work of such artists as Paul Gauguin. Bakst, also Jewish, was a designer of decorative art and was famous as a draftsman designer of stage sets and costumes for the Ballets Russes, and helped Chagall by acting as a role model for Jewish success. Bakst moved to Paris a year later. Art historian Raymond Cogniat writes that after living and studying art on his own for four years, "Chagall entered into the mainstream of contemporary art. ...His apprenticeship over, Russia had played a memorable initial role in his life."

Chagall stayed in Saint Petersburg until 1910, often visiting Vitebsk where he met Bella Rosenfeld. In My Life, Chagall described his first meeting her: "Her silence is mine, her eyes mine. It is as if she knows everything about my childhood, my present, my future, as if she can see right through me." Bella later wrote, of meeting him, "When you did catch a glimpse of his eyes, they were as blue as if they'd fallen straight out of the sky. They were strange eyes … long, almond-shaped … and each seemed to sail along by itself, like a little boat."

=== France (1910–1914) ===
Marc Chagall, 1911–12, The Drunkard (Le saoul), 1912, oil on canvas. 85 × 115 cm. Private collection

Marc Chagall, 1912, The Fiddler, an inspiration for the musical Fiddler on the Roof (Note: Several of Chagall's paintings inspired the musical; contrary to popular belief, the "title of the musical does not refer to any specific painting".)

In 1910, Chagall relocated to Paris to develop his artistic style. Art historian and curator James Sweeney notes that when Chagall first arrived in Paris, Cubism was the dominant art form, and French art was still dominated by the "materialistic outlook of the 19th century". But Chagall arrived from Russia with "a ripe color gift, a fresh, unashamed response to sentiment, a feeling for simple poetry and a sense of humor", he adds. These notions were alien to Paris at that time, and as a result, his first recognition came not from other painters but from poets such as Blaise Cendrars and Guillaume Apollinaire. Art historian Jean Leymarie observes that Chagall began thinking of art as "emerging from the internal being outward, from the seen object to the psychic outpouring", which was the reverse of the Cubist way of creating.

He therefore developed friendships with Guillaume Apollinaire and other avant-garde artists including Robert Delaunay and Fernand Léger. Baal-Teshuva writes that "Chagall's dream of Paris, the city of light and above all, of freedom, had come true." His first days were a hardship for the 23-year-old Chagall, who was lonely in the big city and unable to speak French. Some days he felt like fleeing back to Russia, as he daydreamed while he painted, about the riches of Russian folklore, his Hasidic experiences, his family, and especially Bella.

In Paris, he enrolled at Académie de La Palette, an avant-garde school of art where the painters Jean Metzinger, André Dunoyer de Segonzac and Henri Le Fauconnier taught, and also found work at another academy. He would spend his free hours visiting galleries and salons, especially the Louvre; artists he came to admire included Rembrandt, the Le Nain brothers, Chardin, van Gogh, Renoir, Pissarro, Matisse, Gauguin, Courbet, Millet, Manet, Monet, Delacroix, and others. It was in Paris that he learned the technique of gouache, which he used to paint Russian scenes. He also visited Montmartre and the Latin Quarter "and was happy just breathing Parisian air". Baal-Teshuva describes this new phase in Chagall's artistic development:

Chagall was exhilarated, intoxicated, as he strolled through the streets and along the banks of the Seine. Everything about the French capital excited him: the shops, the smell of fresh bread in the morning, the markets with their fresh fruit and vegetables, the wide boulevards, the cafés and restaurants, and above all the Eiffel Tower. Another completely new world that opened up for him was the kaleidoscope of colors and forms in the works of French artists. Chagall enthusiastically reviewed their many different tendencies, having to rethink his position as an artist and decide what creative avenue he wanted to pursue.

Marc Chagall, 1912, Le Marchand de bestiaux (The Drover, The Cattle Dealer), oil on canvas, 97.1 x 202.5 cm, Kunstmuseum Basel

During his time in Paris, Chagall was constantly reminded of his home in Vitebsk, as Paris was also home to many painters, writers, poets, composers, dancers, and other émigrés from the Russian Empire. However, "night after night he painted until dawn", only then going to bed for a few hours, and resisted the many temptations of the big city at night. "My homeland exists only in my soul", he once said. He continued painting Jewish motifs and subjects from his memories of Vitebsk, although he included Parisian scenes — the Eiffel Tower in particular, along with portraits. Many of his works were updated versions of paintings he had made in Russia, transposed into Fauvist or Cubist keys.

Marc Chagall, 1912, Still-life (Nature morte), oil on canvas, private collection

Chagall developed a whole repertoire of quirky motifs: ghostly figures floating in the sky, ... the gigantic fiddler dancing on miniature dollhouses, the livestock and transparent wombs and, within them, tiny offspring sleeping upside down. The majority of his scenes of life in Vitebsk were painted while living in Paris, and "in a sense they were dreams", notes Lewis. Their "undertone of yearning and loss", with a detached and abstract appearance, caused Apollinaire to be "struck by this quality", calling them "surnaturel!" His "animal/human hybrids and airborne phantoms" would later become a formative influence on Surrealism. Chagall, however, did not want his work to be associated with any school or movement and considered his own personal language of symbols to be meaningful to himself. But Sweeney notes that others often still associate his work with "illogical and fantastic painting", especially when he uses "curious representational juxtapositions".

Sweeney writes that "This is Chagall's contribution to contemporary art: the reawakening of a poetry of representation, avoiding factual illustration on the one hand, and non-figurative abstractions on the other". André Breton said that "with him alone, the metaphor made its triumphant return to modern painting".

=== Russia (1914–1922) ===
Because he missed his fiancée, Bella, who was still in Vitebsk—"He thought about her day and night", writes Baal-Teshuva—and was afraid of losing her, Chagall decided to accept an invitation from a noted gallery owner in Berlin to exhibit his work, his intention being to continue on to Russia, marry Bella, and then return with her to Paris. Chagall took 40 canvases and 160 gouaches, watercolors and drawings to be exhibited. The exhibit, held at Herwarth Walden's Sturm Gallery was a huge success, "The German critics positively sang his praises."

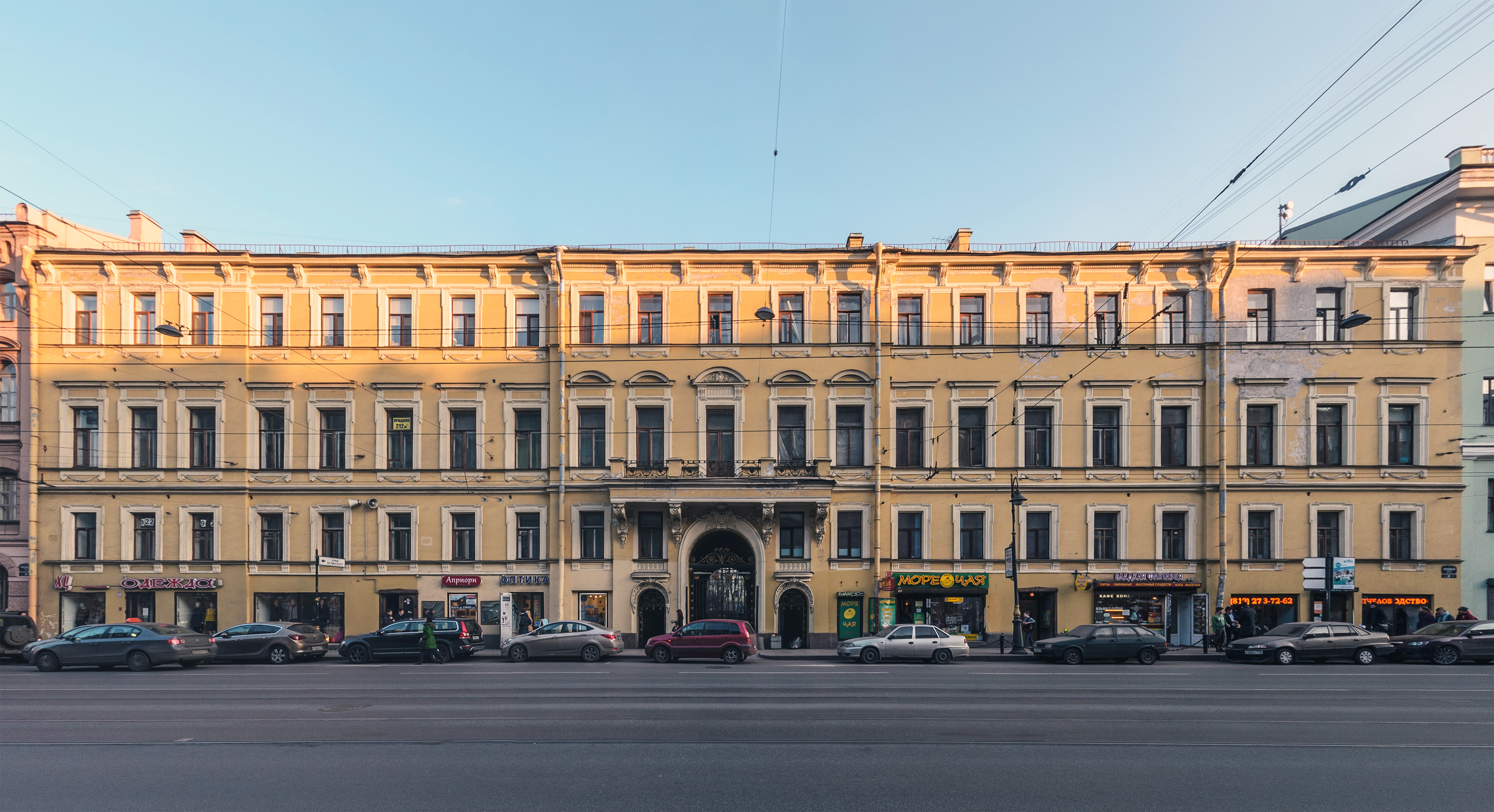
St. Petersburg, Liteyny Avenue, 46, where Chagall served in the War Industry Committee during WWI

After the exhibit, he continued on to Vitebsk, where he planned to stay only long enough to marry Bella. However, after a few weeks, the First World War began, closing the Russian border for an indefinite period. A year later he married Bella Rosenfeld and they had their first child, Ida. During the war, Chagall worked for the War Industry Committee in Petrograd, set up in 1915 to supply the Imperial Russian Army.

Before the marriage, Chagall had difficulty convincing Bella's parents that he would be a suitable husband for their daughter. They were worried about her marrying a painter from a poor family and wondered how he would support her. Becoming a successful artist now became a goal and inspiration. According to Lewis, "[T]he euphoric paintings of this time, which show the young couple floating balloon-like over Vitebsk—its wooden buildings faceted in the Delaunay manner—are the most lighthearted of his career". His wedding pictures were also a subject he would return to in later years as he thought about this period of his life.

Bella with White Collar, 1917

In 1915, Chagall began exhibiting his work in Moscow, first exhibiting his works at a well-known salon and in 1916 exhibiting pictures in St. Petersburg. He again showed his art at a Moscow exhibition of avant-garde artists. This exposure brought recognition, and a number of wealthy collectors began buying his art. He also began illustrating a number of Yiddish books with ink drawings. He illustrated I. L. Peretz's The Magician in 1917. Chagall was 30 years old and had begun to become well known.

The October Revolution of 1917 was a dangerous time for Chagall although it also offered opportunity. Chagall wrote he came to fear Bolshevik orders pinned on fences, writing: "The factories were stopping. The horizons opened. Space and emptiness. No more bread. The black lettering on the morning posters made me feel sick at heart". Chagall was often hungry for days, later remembering watching "a bride, the beggars and the poor wretches weighted down with bundles", leading him to conclude that the new regime had turned the Russian Empire "upside down the way I turn my pictures". By then he was one of Imperial Russia's most distinguished artists and a member of the modernist avant-garde, which enjoyed special privileges and prestige as the "aesthetic arm of the revolution".

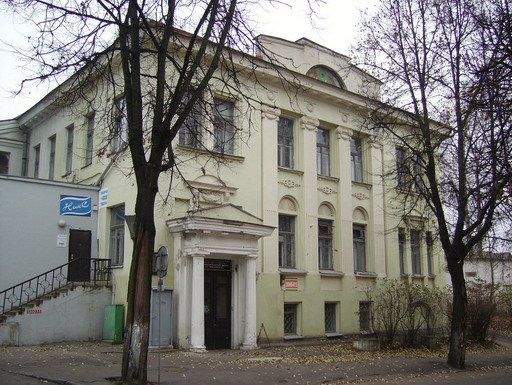
People's Art School where also the Vitebsk Museum of Modern Art was situated

In November 1917, Anatoly Lunacharsky offered Chagall to be in charge of the visual arts department of Narkompros in Petrograd. Chagall refused the offer, mostly due to his disinterest in politics. In the summer of 1918, however, Chagall questioned his refusal and went to visit Lunacharsky in Petrograd. Shortly afterwards the artist was appointed commissar of arts for Vitebsk. This resulted in his founding both the People's Art College, also known as "the Academy", and the Art Museum in Vitebsk. Under Chagall's leadership, the college attracted major artists such as El Lissitzky and Kazimir Malevich,, while the creation of the museum signified the so called "Vitebsk Renaissance" making the town one of the well-known avant-garde centers of the early 20th century. He also hired his first teacher, Yehuda Pen, to work at the school. Chagall tried to create an atmosphere of a collective of independently minded artists, each with their own unique style. However, this would soon prove to be difficult as a few of the key faculty members preferred a Suprematist art of squares and circles, and disapproved of Chagall's attempt at creating "bourgeois individualism". In May 1920, the Academy was taken over by the suprematists, which led to Chagall's resignation and his departure for Moscow. When the suprematists themselves left the Academy, it declined, becoming an ordinary college of applied art. The avant-garde in Russia was then ousted by other artistic trends.

In Moscow he was offered a job as stage designer for the newly formed State Jewish Chamber Theater. It was set to begin operation in early 1921 with a number of plays by Sholem Aleichem. For its opening he created a number of large background murals using techniques he learned from Bakst, his early teacher. One of the main murals was 9 feet (2.7 m) tall by 24 feet (7.3 m) long and included images of various lively subjects such as dancers, fiddlers, acrobats, and farm animals. One critic at the time called it "Hebrew jazz in paint". Chagall created it as a "storehouse of symbols and devices", notes Lewis. The murals "constituted a landmark" in the history of the theatre, and were forerunners of his later large-scale works, including murals for the New York Metropolitan Opera and the Paris Opera.

The First World War ended in 1918, but the Russian Civil War continued, and famine spread. The Chagalls found it necessary to move to a smaller, less expensive, town near Moscow, although Chagall now had to commute to Moscow daily, using crowded trains. In 1921, he worked as an art teacher along with his friend sculptor Isaac Itkind in a Jewish boys' shelter in suburban Malakhovka, which housed young refugees orphaned by pogroms. While there, he created a series of illustrations for the Yiddish poetry cycle Grief written by David Hofstein, who was another teacher at the Malakhovka shelter.

After spending the years between 1921 and 1922 living in primitive conditions, he decided to go back to France so that he could develop his art in a more comfortable country. Numerous other artists, writers, and musicians were also planning to relocate to the West. He applied for an exit visa and while waiting for its uncertain approval, wrote his autobiography, My Life.

=== France (1923–1941) ===
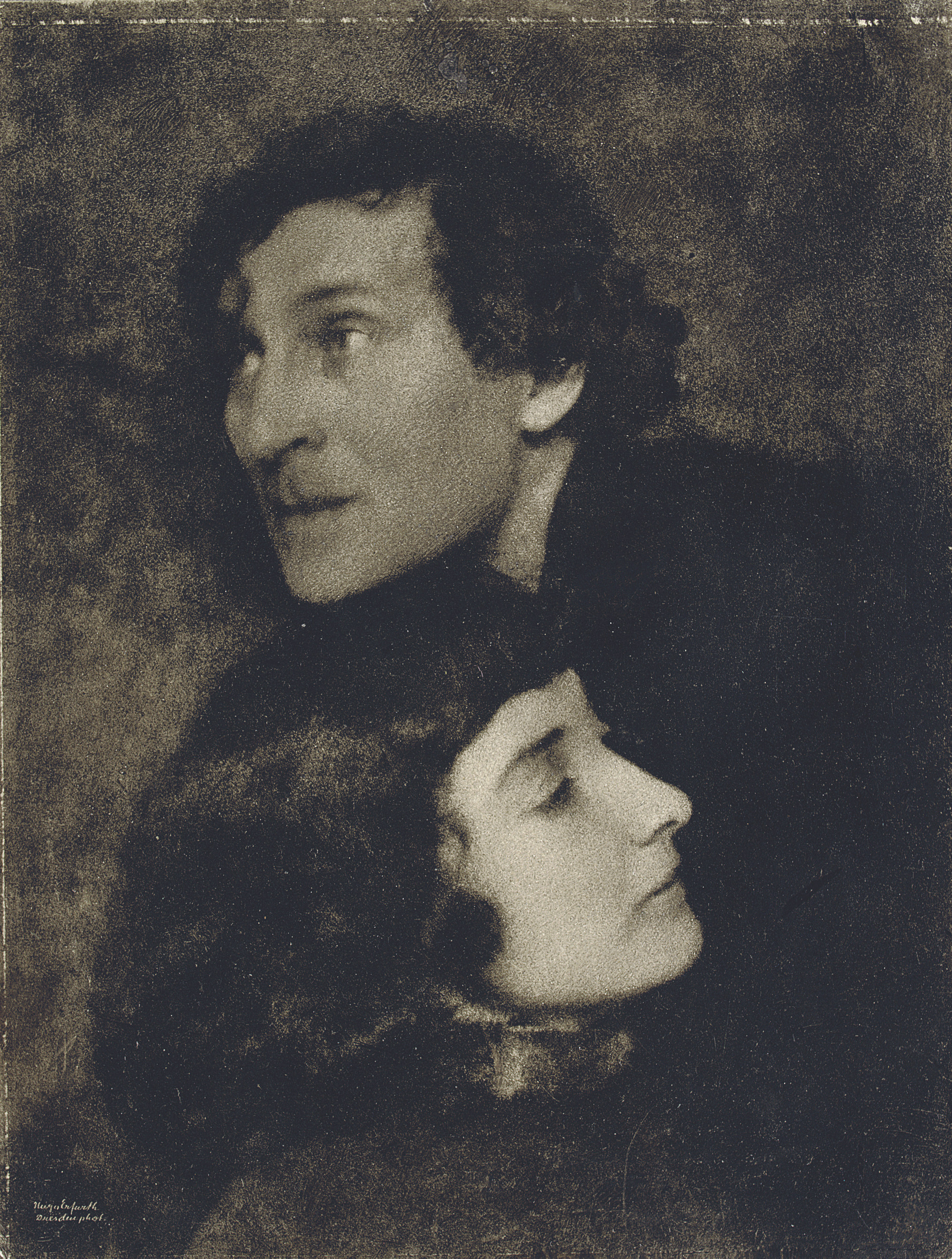
Marc and Bella Chagall by Hugo Erfurth, 1923

In 1923, Chagall left Moscow to return to France. On his way he stopped in Berlin to recover the many pictures he had left there on exhibit ten years earlier, before the war began, but was unable to find or recover any of them. Nonetheless, after returning to Paris he again "rediscovered the free expansion and fulfillment which were so essential to him", writes Lewis. With all his early works now lost, he began trying to paint from his memories of his earliest years in Vitebsk with sketches and oil paintings.

He formed a business relationship with French art dealer Ambroise Vollard. This inspired him to begin creating etchings for a series of illustrated books, including Gogol's Dead Souls, the Bible, and the La Fontaine's Fables. These illustrations would eventually come to represent his finest printmaking efforts. In 1924, he travelled to Brittany and painted La fenêtre sur l'Île-de-Bréhat. By 1926 he had his first exhibition in the United States at the Reinhardt gallery of New York which included about 100 works, although he did not travel to the opening. He instead stayed in France, "painting ceaselessly", notes Baal-Teshuva. It was not until 1927 that Chagall made his name in the French art world, when art critic and historian Maurice Raynal awarded him a place in his book Modern French Painters. However, Raynal was still at a loss to accurately describe Chagall to his readers:

Chagall interrogates life in the light of a refined, anxious, childlike sensibility, a slightly romantic temperament ... a blend of sadness and gaiety characteristic of a grave view of life. His imagination, his temperament, no doubt forbid a Latin severity of composition.

During this period he traveled throughout France and the Côte d'Azur, where he enjoyed the landscapes, colorful vegetation, the blue Mediterranean Sea, and the mild weather. He made repeated trips to the countryside, taking his sketchbook. He also visited nearby countries and later wrote about the impressions some of those travels left on him:

I should like to recall how advantageous my travels outside France have been for me in an artistic sense—in Holland or in Spain, Italy, Egypt, Palestine, or simply in the south of France. There, in the south, for the first time in my life, I saw that rich greenness—the like of which I had never seen in my own country. In Holland I thought I discovered that familiar and throbbing light, like the light between the late afternoon and dusk. In Italy I found that peace of the museums which the sunlight brought to life. In Spain I was happy to find the inspiration of a mystical, if sometimes cruel, past, to find the song of its sky and of its people. And in the East [Palestine] I found unexpectedly the Bible and a part of my very being.

==== The Bible illustrations ====
After returning to Paris from one of his trips, Vollard commissioned Chagall to illustrate the Old Testament. Although he could have completed the project in France, he used the assignment as an excuse to travel to Mandatory Palestine to experience for himself the Holy Land. In 1931 Marc Chagall and his family traveled to Tel Aviv on the invitation of Meir Dizengoff. Dizengoff had previously encouraged Chagall to visit Tel Aviv in connection with Dizengoff's plan to build a Jewish Art Museum in the new city. Chagall and his family were invited to stay at Dizengoff's house in Tel Aviv, which later became Independence Hall of the State of Israel.

Chagall ended up staying in the Holy Land for two months. Chagall felt at home in Israel where many people spoke Yiddish and Russian. According to Jacob Baal-Teshuva, "he was impressed by the pioneering spirit of the people in the kibbutzim and deeply moved by the Wailing Wall and the other holy places".

Chagall later told a friend that Palestine gave him "the most vivid impression he had ever received". Jackie Wullschlager notes, however, that whereas Delacroix and Matisse had found inspiration in the exoticism of North Africa, he as a Jew in Palestine had a different perspective. "What he was really searching for there was not external stimulus but an inner authorization from the land of his ancestors, to plunge into his work on the Bible illustrations". Chagall stated that "In the East I found the Bible and part of my own being."

As a result, he immersed himself in "the history of the Jews, their trials, prophecies, and disasters", notes Wullschlager. She adds that beginning the assignment was an "extraordinary risk" for Chagall, as he had finally become well known as a leading contemporary painter, but would now end his modernist themes and delve into "an ancient past". Between 1931 and 1934 he worked "obsessively" on "The Bible", even going to Amsterdam in order to carefully study the biblical paintings of Rembrandt and El Greco, to see the extremes of religious painting. He walked the streets of the city's Jewish quarter to again feel the earlier atmosphere. He told Franz Meyer:

I did not see the Bible, I dreamed it. Ever since early childhood, I have been captivated by the Bible. It has always seemed to me and still seems today the greatest source of poetry of all time.

Chagall saw the Old Testament as a "human story, ... not with the creation of the cosmos but with the creation of man, and his figures of angels are rhymed or combined with human ones", writes Wullschlager. She points out that in one of his early Bible images, "Abraham and the Three Angels", the angels sit and chat over a glass of wine "as if they have just dropped by for dinner".

He returned to France and by the next year had completed 32 out of the total of 105 plates. By 1939, at the beginning of World War II, he had finished 66. However, Vollard died that same year. When the series was completed in 1956, it was published by Edition Tériade. Baal-Teshuva writes that "the illustrations were stunning and met with great acclaim. Once again Chagall had shown himself to be one of the 20th century's most important graphic artists". Leymarie has described these drawings by Chagall as "monumental" and,

...full of divine inspiration, which retrace the legendary destiny and the epic history of Israel to Genesis to the Prophets, through the Patriarchs and the Heroes. Each picture becomes one with the event, informing the text with a solemn intimacy unknown since Rembrandt.

==== Nazi campaigns against modern art ====
Not long after Chagall began his work on the Bible, Adolf Hitler gained power in Germany. Anti-Semitic laws were being introduced and the first concentration camp at Dachau had been established. Wullschlager describes the early effects on art:

The Nazis had begun their campaign against modernist art as soon as they seized power. Expressionist, cubist, abstract, and surrealist art—anything intellectual, Jewish, foreign, socialist-inspired, or difficult to understand—was targeted, from Picasso and Matisse going back to Cézanne and van Gogh; in its place traditional German realism, accessible and open to patriotic interpretation, was extolled.

Beginning in 1937, about twenty thousand works from German museums were confiscated as "degenerate" by a committee directed by Joseph Goebbels. Although the German press had once "swooned over him", the new German authorities now made a mockery of Chagall's art, describing them as "green, purple, and red Jews shooting out of the earth, fiddling on violins, flying through the air ... representing [an] assault on Western civilization".

After Germany invaded and occupied France, the Chagalls remained in Vichy France, unaware that French Jews, with the help of the Vichy government, were being collected and sent to German concentration camps, from which few would return. The Vichy collaborationist government, directed by Marshal Philippe Pétain, immediately upon assuming power established a commission to "redefine French citizenship" with the aim of stripping "undesirables", including naturalized citizens, of their French nationality. Chagall had been so involved with his art, that it was not until October 1940, after the Vichy government, at the behest of the Nazi occupying forces, began approving anti-Semitic laws, that he began to understand what was happening. Learning that Jews were being removed from public and academic positions, the Chagalls finally "woke up to the danger they faced". But Wullschlager notes that "by then they were trapped". Their only refuge could be the US, but "they could not afford the passage to New York" or the large bond that each immigrant had to provide upon entry to ensure that they would not become a financial burden to the country.

==== Escaping occupied France ====
According to Wullschlager, "[T]he speed with which France collapsed astonished everyone: the [British-supported French army] capitulated even more quickly than Poland had done" a year earlier. Shock waves crossed the Atlantic...as Paris had until then been equated with civilization throughout the non-Nazi world." Yet the attachment of the Chagalls to France "blinded them to the urgency of the situation." Many other well-known Russian and Jewish artists eventually sought to escape: these included Chaïm Soutine, Max Ernst, Max Beckmann, Ludwig Fulda, author Victor Serge and prize-winning author Vladimir Nabokov, who although not Jewish himself, was married to a Jewish woman. Russian author Victor Serge described many of the people living temporarily in Marseille who were waiting to emigrate to the US:

Here is a beggar's alley gathering the remnants of revolutions, democracies and crushed intellects... In our ranks are enough doctors, psychologists, engineers, educationalists, poets, painters, writers, musicians, economists and public men to vitalize a whole great country.

After prodding by their daughter Ida, who "perceived the need to act fast", and with help from Alfred Barr of the New York Museum of Modern Art, Chagall was saved by having his name added to the list of prominent artists whose lives were at risk and whom the United States should try to extricate. Varian Fry, the US journalist, and Hiram Bingham IV, the US Vice-Consul in Marseilles, ran a rescue operation to smuggle artists and intellectuals out of Europe to the US by providing them with forged visas to the US. In April 1941, Chagall and his wife were stripped of their French citizenship. The Chagalls stayed at the Hotel Moderne in Marseille where they were arrested along with other Jews. Varian Fry managed to pressure the French police to release him, threatening them of the scandal. (Note: Varian Fry's "Surrender on Demand" was originally published by Random House in 1945) Chagall was one of over 2,000 rescued by this operation. He left France in May 1941, "when it was almost too late", adds Lewis. Picasso and Matisse were also invited to come to the US but they decided to remain in France. On 10 June 1941 Chagall and Bella left Lisbon aboard the Portuguese ship Mouzinho. The passengers included 119 refugee children, to whom Chagall gave drawing lessons on the voyage. The ship reached Staten Island on 21 June, the day before Germany invaded the Soviet Union. Ida and her husband Michel followed on the notorious refugee ship Navemar with a large case of Chagall's work. A chance post-war meeting in a French café between Ida and intelligence analyst Konrad Kellen led to Kellen carrying more paintings on his return to the United States.

=== United States (1941–1948) ===
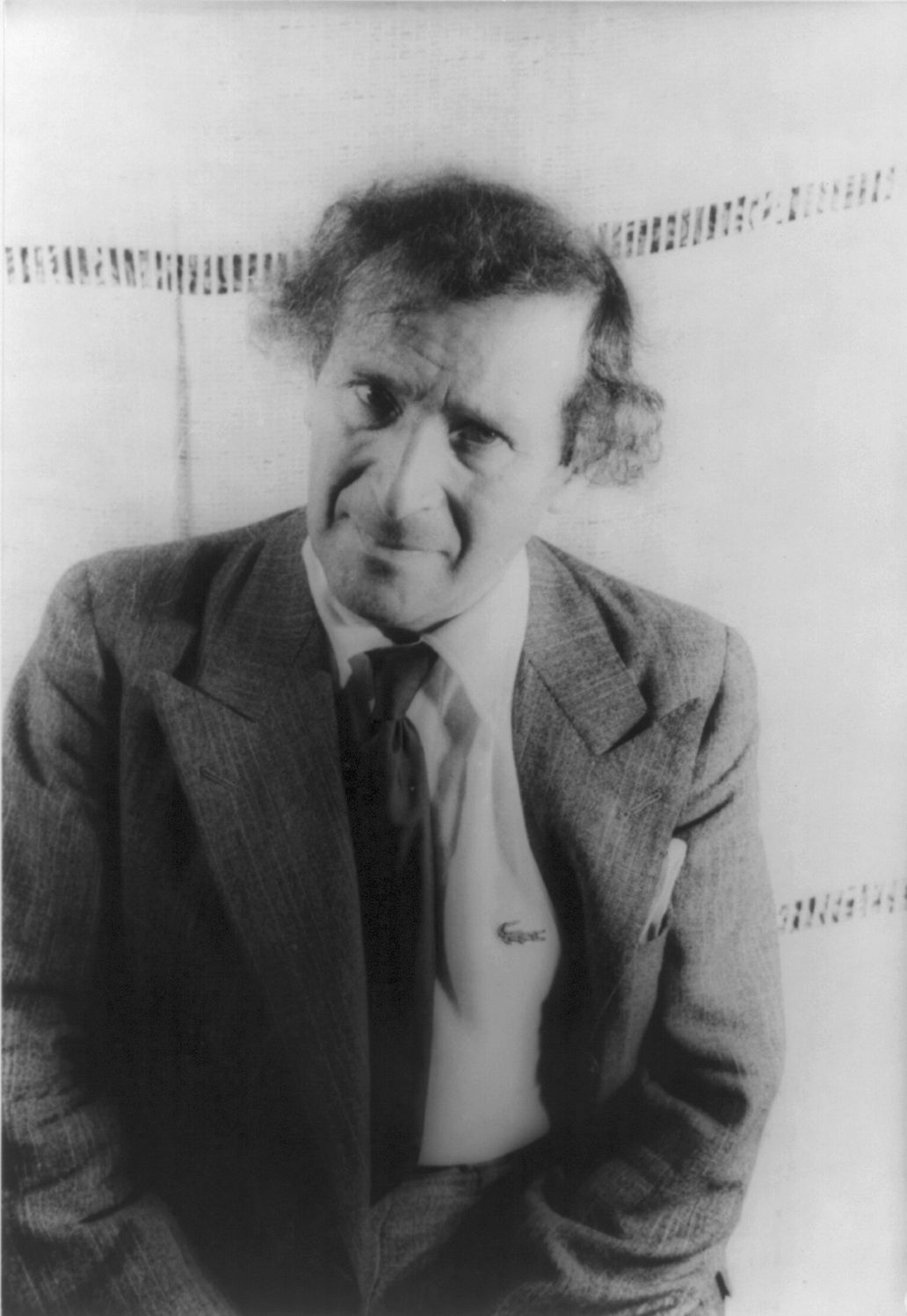
Photo portrait of Chagall in 1941 by Carl Van Vechten

Even before arriving in the United States in 1941, Chagall was awarded the Carnegie Prize third prize in 1939 for "Les Fiancés". After being in the US he discovered that he had already achieved "international stature", writes Cogniat, although he felt ill-suited in this new role in a foreign country whose language he could not yet speak. He became a celebrity mostly against his will, feeling lost in the strange surroundings.

After a while he began to settle in New York, which was full of writers, painters, and composers who, like himself, had fled from Europe during the Nazi invasions. He lived at 4 East 74th Street. He spent time visiting galleries and museums, and befriended other artists including Piet Mondrian and André Breton.

Baal-Teshuva writes that Chagall "loved" going to the sections of New York where Jews lived, especially the Lower East Side. There he felt at home, enjoying the Jewish foods and being able to read the Yiddish press, which became his main source of information since he did not yet speak English.

Contemporary artists did not yet understand or even like Chagall's art. According to Baal-Teshuva, "they had little in common with a folkloristic storyteller of Russo-Jewish extraction with a propensity for mysticism." The Paris School, which was referred to as 'Parisian Surrealism', meant little to them. Those attitudes would begin to change, however, when Pierre Matisse, the son of recognized French artist Henri Matisse, became his representative and managed Chagall exhibitions in New York and Chicago in 1941. One of the earliest exhibitions included 21 of his masterpieces from 1910 to 1941. Art critic Henry McBride wrote about this exhibit for the New York Sun:

Chagall is about as gypsy as they come... these pictures do more for his reputation than anything we have previously seen... His colors sparkle with poetry... his work is authentically Russian as a Volga boatman's song...

==== Aleko ballet (1942) ====
He was offered a commission by choreographer Léonide Massine of the Ballet Theatre of New York to design the sets and costumes for his new ballet, Aleko. This ballet would stage the words of Alexander Pushkin's verse narrative The Gypsies with the music of Tchaikovsky. The ballet was originally planned for a New York debut, but as a cost-saving measure it was moved to Mexico where labor costs were cheaper than in New York. While Chagall had done stage settings before while in Russia, this was his first ballet, and it would give him the opportunity to visit Mexico. While there, he quickly began to appreciate the "primitive ways and colorful art of the Mexicans", notes Cogniat. He found "something very closely related to his own nature", and did all the color detail for the sets while there. Eventually, he created four large backdrops and had Mexican seamstresses sew the ballet costumes.

When the ballet premiered at the Palacio de Bellas Artes in Mexico City on 8 September 1942 it was considered a "remarkable success". In the audience were other famous mural painters who came to see Chagall's work, including Diego Rivera and José Clemente Orozco. According to Baal-Teshuva, when the final bar of music ended, "there was a tumultuous applause and 19 curtain calls, with Chagall himself being called back onto the stage again and again." The production then moved to New York, where it was presented four weeks later at the Metropolitan Opera and the response was repeated, "again Chagall was the hero of the evening". Art critic Edwin Denby wrote of the opening for the New York Herald Tribune that Chagall's work:

has turned into a dramatized exhibition of giant paintings... It surpasses anything Chagall has done on the easel scale, and it is a breathtaking experience, of a kind one hardly expects in the theatre.

==== Coming to grips with World War II ====
After Chagall returned to New York in 1943 current events began to interest him more, and this was represented by his art, where he painted subjects including the Crucifixion and scenes of war. He learned that the Germans had destroyed the town where he was raised, Vitebsk, and became greatly distressed. He also learned about the Nazi concentration camps. During a speech in February 1944, he described some of his feelings:

Meanwhile, the enemy jokes, saying that we are a "stupid nation". He thought that when he started slaughtering the Jews, we would all in our grief suddenly raise the greatest prophetic scream, and would be joined by the Christian humanists. But, after two thousand years of "Christianity" in the world—say whatever you like—but, with few exceptions, their hearts are silent... I see the artists in Christian nations sit still—who has heard them speak up? They are not worried about themselves, and our Jewish life doesn't concern them.

In the same speech he credited Soviet Russia with doing the most to save the Jews:

The Jews will always be grateful to it. What other great country has saved a million and a half Jews from Hitler's hands, and shared its last piece of bread? What country abolished antisemitism? What other country devoted at least a piece of land as an autonomous region for Jews who want to live there? All this, and more, weighs heavily on the scales of history.

On 2 September 1944, Bella died suddenly due to a streptococcus infection, which could not be treated at the Mercy General Hospital as they had no penicillin due to wartime restrictions. As a result, he stopped all work for many months, and when he did resume painting his first pictures were concerned with preserving Bella's memory. Wullschlager writes of the effect on Chagall: "As news poured in through 1945 of the ongoing Holocaust at Nazi concentration camps, Bella took her place in Chagall's mind with the millions of Jewish victims." He even considered the possibility that their "exile from Europe had sapped her will to live".

With Virginia Haggard McNeil in 1948

After a year of living with his daughter Ida and her husband Michel Gordey, he entered into a romance with Virginia Haggard, daughter of diplomat Godfrey Haggard and great-niece of the author H. Rider Haggard; their relationship endured seven years. They had a child together, David McNeil, born 22 June 1946. Haggard recalled her "seven years of plenty" with Chagall in her book, My Life with Chagall (Robert Hale, 1986).

A few months after the Allies succeeded in liberating Paris from Nazi occupation, with the help of the Allied armies, Chagall published a letter in a Paris weekly, "To the Paris Artists":

In recent years I have felt unhappy that I couldn't be with you, my friends. My enemy forced me to take the road of exile. On that tragic road, I lost my wife, the companion of my life, the woman who was my inspiration. I want to say to my friends in France that she joins me in this greeting, she who loved France and French art so faithfully. Her last joy was the liberation of Paris... Now, when Paris is liberated, when the art of France is resurrected, the whole world too will, once and for all, be free of the satanic enemies who wanted to annihilate not just the body but also the soul—the soul, without which there is no life, no artistic creativity.

==== Post-war years ====
By 1946, his artwork was becoming more widely recognized. The Museum of Modern Art in New York had a large exhibition representing 40 years of his work which gave visitors one of the first complete impressions of the changing nature of his art over the years. The war had ended and he began making plans to return to Paris. According to Cogniat, "He found he was even more deeply attached than before, not only to the atmosphere of Paris, but to the city itself, to its houses and its views." Chagall summed up his years living in the US:

I lived here in America during the inhuman war in which humanity deserted itself... I have seen the rhythm of life. I have seen America fighting with Allies... the wealth that she has distributed to bring relief to the people who had to suffer the consequences of the war... I like America and the Americans... people there are frank. It is a young country with the qualities and faults of youth. It is a delight to love people like that... Above all I am impressed by the greatness of this country and the freedom that it gives.

He went back to France for good during the autumn of 1947, where he attended the opening of the exhibition of his works at the Musée National d'Art Moderne.

=== France (1948–1985) ===
After returning to France he traveled throughout Europe and chose to live in the Côte d'Azur which by that time had become somewhat of an "artistic centre". Matisse lived near Saint-Paul-de-Vence, about seven miles west of Nice, while Picasso lived in Vallauris. Although they lived nearby and sometimes worked together, there was artistic rivalry between them as their work was so distinctly different, and they never became long-term friends. According to Picasso's mistress, Françoise Gilot, Picasso still had a great deal of respect for Chagall, and once told her,

When Matisse dies, Chagall will be the only painter left who understands what color is... His canvases are really painted, not just tossed together. Some of the last things he's done in Vence convince me that there's never been anybody since Renoir who has the feeling for light that Chagall has."

In April 1952, Virginia Haggard left Chagall for the photographer Charles Leirens; she went on to become a professional photographer herself.

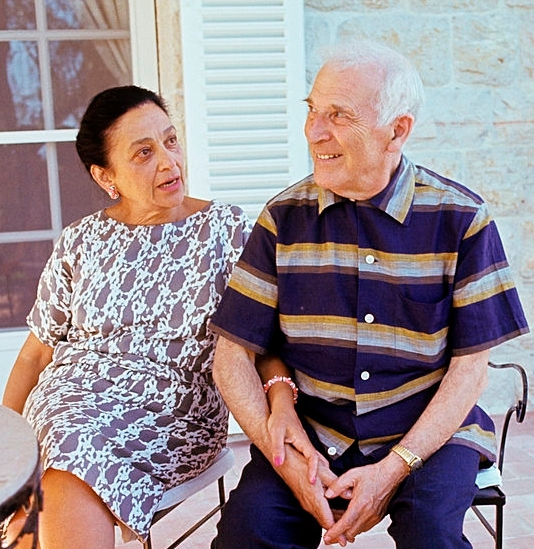
Vava Brodsky and Marc Chagall in 1967

Chagall's daughter Ida married art historian Franz Meyer in January 1952, and feeling that her father missed the companionship of a woman in his home, introduced him to Valentina (Vava) Brodsky, a woman from a similar Russian Jewish background, who had run a successful millinery business in London. She became his secretary, and after a few months agreed to stay only if Chagall married her. The marriage took place in July 1952—though six years later, when there was conflict between Ida and Vava, "Marc and Vava divorced and immediately remarried under an agreement more favourable to Vava" (Jean-Paul Crespelle, author of Chagall, l'Amour le Reve et la Vie, quoted in Haggard: My Life with Chagall).

In 1954, he was engaged as set decorator for Robert Helpmann's production of Rimsky-Korsakov's opera Le Coq d'Or at the Royal Opera House, Covent Garden, but he withdrew. The Australian designer Loudon Sainthill was drafted at short notice in his place.

In the years ahead he was able to produce not just paintings and graphic art, but also numerous sculptures and ceramics, including wall tiles, painted vases, plates and jugs. He also began working in larger-scale formats, producing large murals, stained glass windows, mosaics and tapestries.

==== Ceiling of the Paris Opera (1963) ====
In 1963, Chagall was commissioned to paint the new ceiling for the Paris Opera (Palais Garnier), a majestic 19th-century building and national monument. André Malraux, France's Minister of Culture wanted something unique and decided Chagall would be the ideal artist. However, this choice of artist caused controversy: some objected to having a Russian Jew decorate a French national monument; others disliked the ceiling of the historic building being painted by a modern artist. Some magazines wrote condescending articles about Chagall and Malraux, about which Chagall commented to one writer:

They really had it in for me... It is amazing the way the French resent foreigners. You live here most of your life. You become a naturalized French citizen... work for nothing decorating their cathedrals, and still they despise you. You are not one of them.

Nonetheless, Chagall continued the project, which took the 77-year-old artist a year to complete. The final canvas was nearly 2,400 square feet (220 sq. meters) and required 440 pounds (200 kg) of paint. It had five sections which were glued to polyester panels and hoisted up to the 70-foot (21 m) ceiling. The images Chagall painted on the canvas paid tribute to the composers Mozart, Wagner, Mussorgsky, Berlioz and Ravel, as well as to famous actors and dancers.

It was presented to the public on 23 September 1964 in the presence of Malraux and 2,100 invited guests. The Paris correspondent for the New York Times wrote, "For once the best seats were in the uppermost circle: Baal-Teshuva writes:

To begin with, the big crystal chandelier hanging from the centre of the ceiling was unlit... the entire corps de ballet came onto the stage, after which, in Chagall's honour, the opera's orchestra played the finale of the "Jupiter Symphony" by Mozart, Chagall's favorite composer. During the last bars of the music, the chandelier lit up, bringing the artist's ceiling painting to life in all its glory, drawing rapturous applause from the audience.

After the new ceiling was unveiled, "even the bitterest opponents of the commission seemed to fall silent", writes Baal-Teshuva. "Unanimously, the press declared Chagall's new work to be a great contribution to French culture." Malraux later said, "What other living artist could have painted the ceiling of the Paris Opera in the way Chagall did?... He is above all one of the great colourists of our time... many of his canvases and the Opera ceiling represent sublime images that rank among the finest poetry of our time, just as Titian produced the finest poetry of his day." In Chagall's speech to the audience he explained the meaning of the work:

Up there in my painting I wanted to reflect, like a mirror in a bouquet, the dreams and creations of the singers and musicians, to recall the movement of the colourfully attired audience below, and to honour the great opera and ballet composers... Now I offer this work as a gift of gratitude to France and her École de Paris, without which there would be no colour and no freedom.

== Art styles and techniques ==
=== Color ===
Bestiaire et Musique (1969)

According to Cogniat, in all Chagall's work during all stages of his life, it was his colors which attracted and captured the viewer's attention. During his earlier years his range was limited by his emphasis on form and his pictures never gave the impression of painted drawings. He adds, "The colors are a living, integral part of the picture and are never passively flat, or banal like an afterthought. They sculpt and animate the volume of the shapes... they indulge in flights of fancy and invention which add new perspectives and graduated, blended tones... His colors do not even attempt to imitate nature but rather to suggest movements, planes and rhythms."

He was able to convey striking images using only two or three colors. Cogniat writes, "Chagall is unrivalled in this ability to give a vivid impression of explosive movement with the simplest use of colors..." Throughout his life his colors created a "vibrant atmosphere" which was based on "his own personal vision."

=== Subject matter ===
==== From life memories to fantasy ====
Chagall's early life in Russia left him with a "powerful visual memory and a pictorial intelligence", writes Goodman. After living in France and experiencing the atmosphere of artistic freedom, his "vision soared and he created a new reality, one that drew on both his inner and outer worlds." But it was the images and memories of his early years in Russia that would sustain his art for more than 70 years.

The Circus Horse

According to Cogniat, there are certain elements in his art that have remained permanent and seen throughout his career. One of those was his choice of subjects and the way they were portrayed. "The most obviously constant element is his gift for happiness and his instinctive compassion, which even in the most serious subjects prevents him from dramatization..." Musicians have been a constant during all stages of his work. After he first got married, "lovers have sought each other, embraced, caressed, floated through the air, met in wreaths of flowers, stretched, and swooped like the melodious passage of their vivid day-dreams. Acrobats contort themselves with the grace of exotic flowers on the end of their stems; flowers and foliage abound everywhere." Wullschlager explains the sources for these images:

For him, clowns and acrobats always resembled figures in religious paintings... The evolution of the circus works... reflects a gradual clouding of his worldview, and the circus performers now gave way to the prophet or sage in his work—a figure into whom Chagall poured his anxiety as Europe darkened, and he could no longer rely on the lumiére-liberté of France for inspiration.

Chagall described his love of circus people:

Why am I so touched by their makeup and grimaces? With them I can move toward new horizons... Chaplin seeks to do in film what I am trying to do in my paintings. He is perhaps the only artist today I could get along with without having to say a single word.

His early pictures were often of the town where he was born and raised, Vitebsk. Cogniat notes that they are realistic and give the impression of firsthand experience by capturing a moment in time with action, often with a dramatic image. During his later years, as for instance in the "Bible series", subjects were more dramatic. He managed to blend the real with the fantastic, and combined with his use of color the pictures were always at least acceptable if not powerful. He never attempted to present pure reality but always created his atmospheres through fantasy. In all cases Chagall's "most persistent subject is life itself, in its simplicity or its hidden complexity... He presents for our study places, people, and objects from his own life".

==== Jewish themes ====
After absorbing the techniques of Fauvism and Cubism (under the influence of Jean Metzinger and Albert Gleizes) Chagall was able to blend these stylistic tendencies with his own folkish style. He gave the grim life of Hasidic Jews the "romantic overtones of a charmed world", notes Goodman. It was by combining the aspects of Modernism with his "unique artistic language", that he was able to catch the attention of critics and collectors throughout Europe. Generally, it was his boyhood of living in a Belarusian provincial town that gave him a continual source of imaginative stimuli. Chagall would become one of many Jewish émigrés who later became noted artists, all of them similarly having once been part of "Russia's most numerous and creative minorities", notes Goodman.

World War I, which ended in 1918, had displaced nearly a million Jews and destroyed most of what remained of the provincial shtetl culture that had defined life for most Eastern European Jews for centuries. Goodman notes, "The fading of traditional Jewish society left artists like Chagall with powerful memories that could no longer be fed by a tangible reality. Instead, that culture became an emotional and intellectual source that existed solely in memory and the imagination... So rich had the experience been, it sustained him for the rest of his life." Sweeney adds that "if you ask Chagall to explain his paintings, he would reply, 'I don't understand them at all. They are not literature. They are only pictorial arrangements of images that obsess me..."

In 1948, after returning to France from the U.S. after the war, he saw for himself the destruction that the war had brought to Europe and the Jewish populations. In 1951, as part of a memorial book dedicated to eighty-four Jewish artists who were killed by the Nazis in France, he wrote a poem entitled "For the Slaughtered Artists: 1950", which inspired paintings such as the Song of David:

I see the fire, the smoke and the gas; rising to the blue cloud, turning it black. I see the torn-out hair, the pulled-out teeth. They overwhelm me with my rabid palette. I stand in the desert before heaps of boots, clothing, ash and dung, and mumble my Kaddish. And as I stand—from my paintings, the painted David descends to me, harp in hand. He wants to help me weep and recite chapters of Psalms.

Lewis writes that Chagall "remains the most important visual artist to have borne witness to the world of East European Jewry... and inadvertently became the public witness of a now vanished civilization." Although Judaism has religious inhibitions about pictorial art of many religious subjects, Chagall managed to use his fantasy images as a form of visual metaphor combined with folk imagery. His "Fiddler on the Roof", for example, combines a folksy village setting with a fiddler as a way to show the Jewish love of music as important to the Jewish spirit.

Music played an important role in shaping the subjects of his work. While he later came to love the music of Bach and Mozart, during his youth he was mostly influenced by the music within the Hasidic community where he was raised. Art historian Franz Meyer points out that one of the main reasons for the unconventional nature of his work is related to the hassidism which inspired the world of his childhood and youth and had actually impressed itself on most Eastern European Jews since the 18th century. He writes, "For Chagall this is one of the deepest sources, not of inspiration, but of a certain spiritual attitude... the hassidic spirit is still the basis and source of nourishment of his art." In a talk that Chagall gave in 1963 while visiting the US, he discussed some of those impressions.

However, Chagall had a complex relationship with Judaism. On the one hand, he credited his Russian Jewish cultural background as being crucial to his artistic imagination. But however ambivalent he was about his religion, he could not avoid drawing upon his Jewish past for artistic material. As an adult, he was not a practicing Jew, but through his paintings and stained glass, he continually tried to suggest a more "universal message", using both Jewish and Christian themes.

For about two thousand years a reserve of energy has fed and supported us, and filled our lives, but during the last century a split has opened in this reserve, and its components have begun to disintegrate: God, perspective, colour, the Bible, shape, line, traditions, the so-called humanities, love, devotion, family, school, education, the prophets and Christ himself. Have I too, perhaps, doubted in my time? I painted pictures upside down, decapitated people and dissected them, scattering the pieces in the air, all in the name of another perspective, another kind of picture composition and another formalism.

He was also at pains to distance his work from a single Jewish focus. At the opening of The Chagall Museum in Nice he said 'My painting represents not the dream of one people but of all humanity'.

== Stained glass ==
One of Chagall's major contributions to art has been his work with stained glass. This medium allowed him further to express his desire to create intense and fresh colors and had the added benefit of natural light and refraction interacting and constantly changing: everything from the position where the viewer stood to the weather outside would alter the visual effect (though this is not the case with his Hadassah windows). It was not until 1956, when he was nearly 70 years of age, that he designed windows for the Église Notre-Dame de Toute Grâce du Plateau d'Assy, his first major project. The project was at the behest of Father Couturier, a monk who is credited with reviving religious art in France. Then, from 1958 to 1960, he created windows for Metz Cathedral. This was a collaboration with glassmaker Charles Marq and their interchanges focussed on how variations in natural lighting could transform the work.

=== Jerusalem Windows (1962) ===
In 1960, he began creating stained glass windows for the synagogue of Hebrew University's Hadassah Medical Center in Jerusalem. Leymarie writes that "in order to illuminate the synagogue both spiritually and physically", it was decided that the twelve windows, representing the twelve tribes of Israel, were to be filled with stained glass. Chagall envisaged the synagogue as "a crown offered to the Jewish Queen", and the windows as "jewels of translucent fire", she writes. Chagall then devoted the next two years to the task, and upon completion in 1961 the windows were exhibited in Paris and then the Museum of Modern Art in New York. They were installed permanently in Jerusalem in February 1962. Each of the twelve windows is approximately 11 feet high and 8 feet (2.4 m) wide, much larger than anything he had done before. Cogniat considers them to be "his greatest work in the field of stained glass", although Virginia Haggard McNeil records Chagall's disappointment that they were to be lit with artificial light, and so would not change according to the conditions of natural light.

French philosopher Gaston Bachelard commented that "Chagall reads the Bible and suddenly the passages become light." In 1973 Israel released a 12-stamp set with images of the stained-glass windows.

The windows symbolize the twelve tribes of Israel who were blessed by Jacob and Moses in the verses which conclude Genesis and Deuteronomy. In those books, notes Leymarie, "The dying Moses repeated Jacob's solemn act and, in a somewhat different order, also blessed the twelve tribes of Israel who were about to enter the land of Canaan... In the synagogue, where the windows are distributed in the same way, the tribes form a symbolic guard of honor around the tabernacle." Leymarie describes the physical and spiritual significance of the windows:

The essence of the Jerusalem Windows lies in color, in Chagall's magical ability to animate material and transform it into light. Words do not have the power to describe Chagall's color, its spirituality, its singing quality, its dazzling luminosity, its ever more subtle flow, and its sensitivity to the inflections of the soul and the transports of the imagination. It is simultaneously jewel-hard and foamy, reverberating and penetrating, radiating light from an unknown interior.

At the dedication ceremony in 1962, Chagall described his feelings about the windows:

For me a stained glass window is a transparent partition between my heart and the heart of the world. Stained glass has to be serious and passionate. It is something elevating and exhilarating. It has to live through the perception of light. To read the Bible is to perceive a certain light, and the window has to make this obvious through its simplicity and grace... The thoughts have nested in me for many years, since the time when my feet walked on the Holy Land, when I prepared myself to create engravings of the Bible. They strengthened me and encouraged me to bring my modest gift to the Jewish people—that people that lived here thousands of years ago, among the other Semitic peoples.

=== Peace, United Nations building (1964) ===
In 1964 Chagall created a stained-glass window, entitled Peace, for the UN in honor of Dag Hammarskjöld, the UN's second secretary general who was killed in an airplane crash in Northern Rhodesia in 1961. The window is about 15 feet (4.6 m) wide and 12 feet (3.7 m) high and contains symbols of peace and love along with musical symbols. Chagall's own handwritten dedication reads:

À tous ceux qui ont servi les buts et principes de la Charte des Nations Unies et pour lesquels Dag Hammarskjöld a donné sa vie.

To all who served the Purposes and Principles of the United Nations Charter, for which Dag Hammarskjöld gave his life

=== Good Samaritan, Union Church of Pocantico Hills (1964) ===
In 1967 he dedicated a stained-glass window to John D. Rockefeller in the Union Church of Pocantico Hills, New York.

=== Fraumünster in Zurich, Switzerland (1967) ===
The Fraumünster church in Zurich, Switzerland, founded in 853, is known for its five large stained glass windows created by Chagall in 1967. Each window is 32 feet (9.8 m) tall by 3 feet (0.91 m) wide. Religion historian James H. Charlesworth notes that it is "surprising how Christian symbols are featured in the works of an artist who comes from a strict and Orthodox Jewish background." He surmises that Chagall, as a result of his Russian background, often used Russian icons in his paintings, with their interpretations of Christian symbols. He explains that his chosen themes were usually derived from biblical stories, and frequently portrayed the "obedience and suffering of God's chosen people." One of the panels depicts Moses receiving the Torah, with rays of light from his head. At the top of another panel is a depiction of Jesus' crucifixion.

=== St Stephan's church in Mainz, Germany (1978) ===
In 1978 he began creating windows for St Stephan's church in Mainz, Germany. Today, 200,000 visitors a year visit the church, and "tourists from the whole world pilgrim up St Stephan's Mount, to see the glowing blue stained glass windows by the artist Marc Chagall", states the city's web site. "St Stephan's is the only German church for which Chagall has created windows."

The website also notes, "The colours address our vital consciousness directly, because they tell of optimism, hope and delight in life", says Monsignor Klaus Mayer, who imparts Chagall's work in meditations and books. He corresponded with Chagall during 1973, and succeeded in persuading the "master of colour and the biblical message" to create a sign for Jewish-Christian attachment and international understanding. Centuries earlier Mainz had been "the capital of European Jewry", and contained the largest Jewish community in Europe, notes historian John Man. In 1978, at the age of 91, Chagall created the first window and eight more followed. Chagall's collaborator Charles Marq complemented Chagall's work by adding several stained glass windows using the typical colors of Chagall.

=== All Saints Church, Tudeley, UK (1963–1978) ===
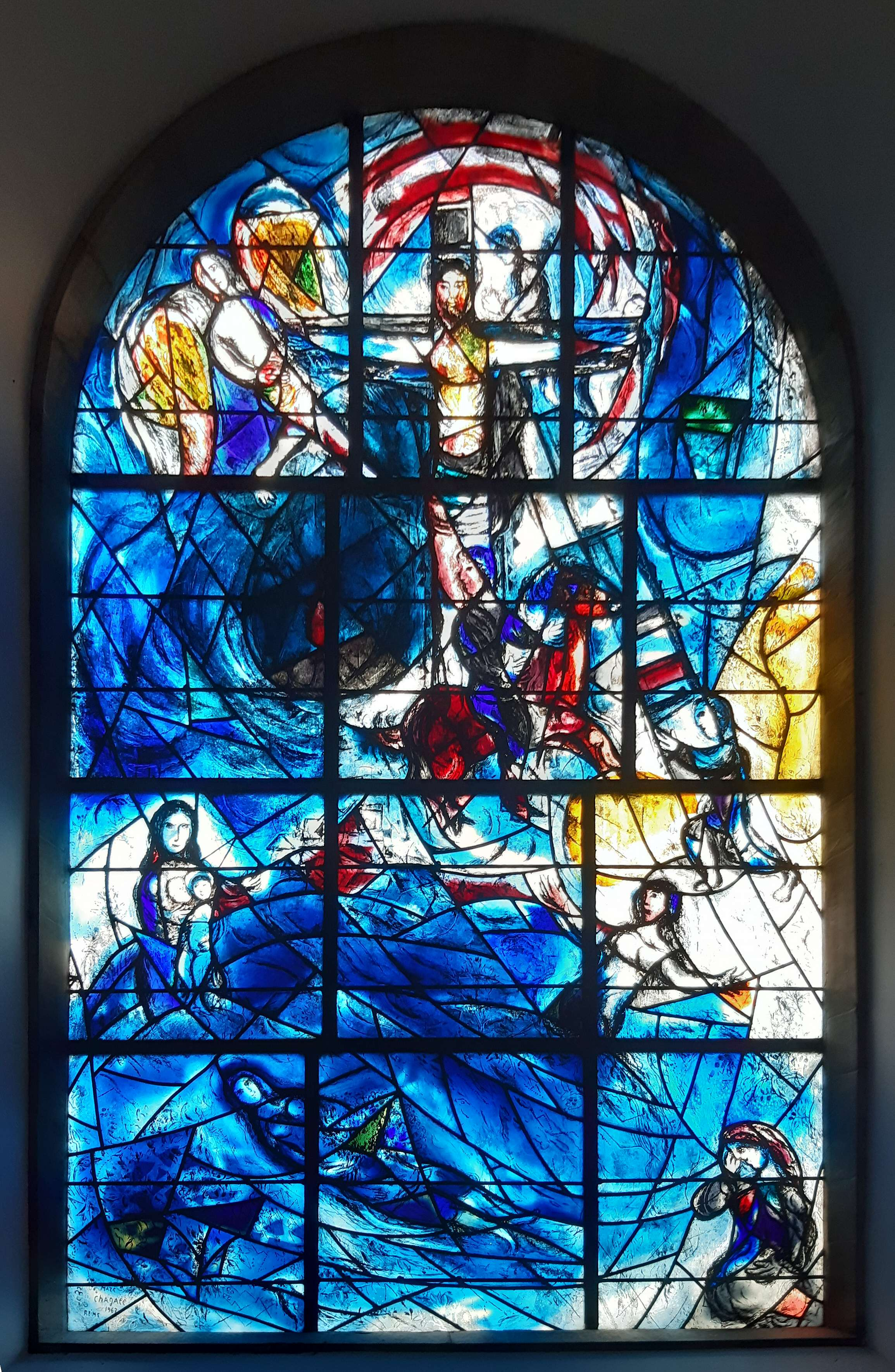
Window 8, the East or Memorial Window for Sarah d'Avigdor Goldsmid, drowned aged 21, was the first window that Chagall made for All Saints Church, Tudeley. He went on to decorate all the other windows.

All Saints Church, Tudeley, is the only church in the world to have all its twelve windows decorated by Chagall. The other three religious buildings with complete sets of Chagall windows are the Hadassah Medical Center synagogue, the Chapel of Le Saillant, Limousin, and the Union Church of Pocantico Hills, New York.

The windows at Tudeley were commissioned by Sir Henry and Lady Rosemary d'Avigdor-Goldsmid as a memorial tribute to their daughter Sarah, who died in 1963 aged 21 in a sailing accident off Rye. When Chagall arrived for the dedication of the east window in 1967, and saw the church for the first time, he exclaimed "C'est magnifique! Je les ferai tous!" ("It's beautiful! I will do them all!") Over the next ten years Chagall designed the remaining eleven windows, made again in collaboration with the glassworker Charles Marq in his workshop at Reims in northern France. The last windows were installed in 1985, just before Chagall's death.

=== Chichester Cathedral, West Sussex, UK ===
On the north side of Chichester Cathedral, there is a stained glass window designed and created by Chagall at the age of 90. The window, his last commissioned work, was inspired by Psalm 150, 'Let everything that hath breath praise the Lord', at the suggestion of Dean Walter Hussey. The window was unveiled by the Duchess of Kent in 1978.

=== America Windows, Chicago ===
Chagall visited Chicago in the early 1970s to install his mural The Four Seasons, and at that time was inspired to create a set of stained glass windows for the Art Institute of Chicago. After discussions with the Art Institute and further reflection, Chagall made the windows a tribute to the American Bicentennial, and in particular the commitment of the United States to cultural and religious freedom. The windows appeared prominently in the 1986 movie Ferris Bueller's Day Off. From 2005 to 2010, the windows were moved due to nearby construction on a new wing of the Art Institute, and for archival cleaning.

== Other forms of art ==
=== Murals, theatre sets and costumes ===
Chagall first worked on stage designs in 1914 while living in Russia, under the inspiration of the theatrical designer and artist Léon Bakst. It was during this period in the Russian theatre that formerly static ideas of stage design were, according to Cogniat, "being swept away in favor of a wholly arbitrary sense of space with different dimensions, perspectives, colors and rhythms." These changes appealed to Chagall who had been experimenting with Cubism and wanted a way to enliven his images. Designing murals and stage designs, Chagall's "dreams sprang to life and became an actual movement."

As a result, Chagall played an important role in Russian artistic life during that time and "was one of the most important forces in the current urge towards anti-realism" which helped the new Russia invent "astonishing" creations. Many of his designs were done for the Jewish Theatre in Moscow which put on numerous Jewish plays by playwrights such as Gogol and Synge. Chagall's set designs helped create illusory atmospheres which became the essence of the theatrical performances.

After leaving Russia, twenty years passed before he was again offered a chance to design theatre sets. In the years between, his paintings still included harlequins, clowns and acrobats, which Cogniat notes "convey his sentimental attachment to and nostalgia for the theatre". His first assignment designing sets after Russia was for the ballet "Aleko" in 1942, while living in the US. In 1945 he was also commissioned to design the sets and costumes for Stravinsky's Firebird. These designs contributed greatly towards his enhanced reputation in the US as a major artist and, as of 2013, are still in use by New York City Ballet.

Cogniat describes how Chagall's designs "immerse the spectator in a luminous, colored fairy-land where forms are mistily defined and the spaces themselves seem animated with whirlwinds or explosions." His technique of using theatrical color in this way reached its peak when Chagall returned to Paris and designed the sets for Ravel's Daphnis et Chloé in 1958.

In 1964 he repainted the ceiling of the Paris Opera using 2,400 square feet (220 m^{2}) of canvas. He painted two monumental murals which hang on opposite sides of the new Metropolitan Opera house at Lincoln Center in New York which opened in 1966. The pieces, The Sources of Music and The Triumph of Music, which hang from the top-most balcony level and extend down to the Grand Tier lobby level, were completed in France and shipped to New York, and are covered by a system of panels during the hours in which the opera house receives direct sunlight to prevent fading. He also designed the sets and costumes for a new production of Die Zauberflöte for the company which opened in February 1967 and was used through the 1981/1982 season.

=== Tapestries ===
Ceramic plate titled Moses

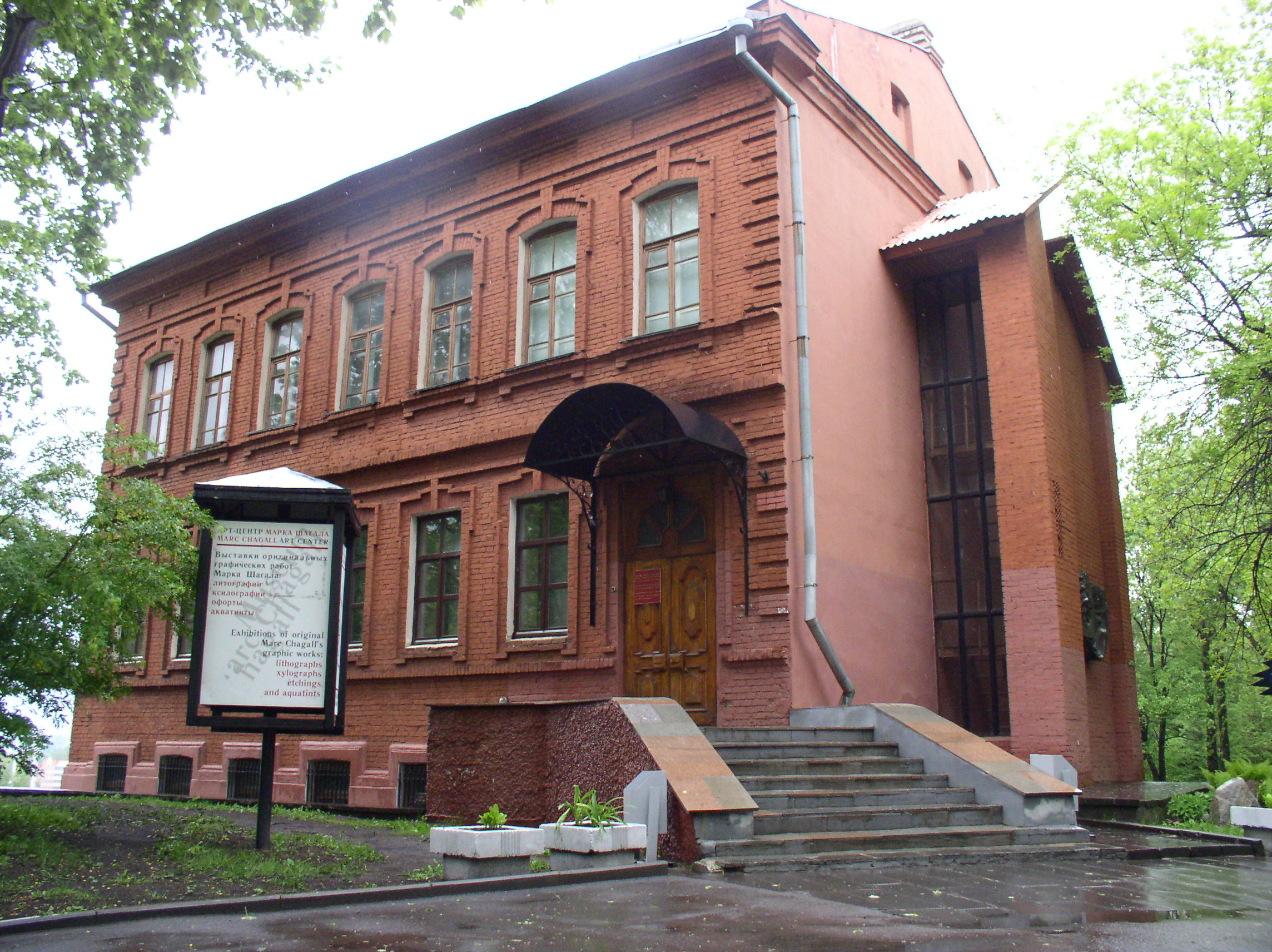
Chagall Art Centre in Vitebsk, Belarus

Chagall also designed tapestries which were woven under the direction of Yvette Cauquil-Prince, who also collaborated with Picasso. These tapestries are much rarer than his paintings, with only 40 of them ever reaching the commercial market. Chagall designed three tapestries for the state hall of the Knesset in Israel, along with 12-floor mosaics and a wall mosaic.

=== Ceramics and sculpture ===
Chagall began learning about ceramics and sculpture while living in south France. Ceramics became a fashion in the Côte d'Azur with various workshops starting up at Antibes, Vence and Vallauris. He took classes along with other known artists including Picasso and Fernand Léger. At first Chagall painted existing pieces of pottery but soon expanded into designing his own, which began his work as a sculptor as a complement to his painting.

After experimenting with pottery and dishes he moved into large ceramic murals. However, he was never satisfied with the limits imposed by the square tile segments which Cogniat notes "imposed on him a discipline which prevented the creation of a plastic image."

== Final years and death ==
Author Serena Davies writes that "By the time he died in France in 1985—the last surviving master of European modernism, outliving Joan Miró by two years—he had experienced at first hand the high hopes and crushing disappointments of the Russian Revolution, and had witnessed the end of the Pale of Settlement, the near annihilation of European Jewry, and the obliteration of Vitebsk, his home town, where only 118 of a population of 240,000 survived the Second World War."

Chagall's final work was a commissioned piece of art for the Rehabilitation Institute of Chicago. The maquette painting titled Job had been completed, but Chagall died just before the completion of the tapestry. Yvette Cauquil-Prince was weaving the tapestry under Chagall's supervision and was the last person to work with Chagall. She left Vava and Marc Chagall's home at 4 pm on 28 March after discussing and matching the final colors from the maquette painting for the tapestry. He died that evening.

His relationship with his Jewish identity was "unresolved and tragic", Davies states. He would have died without Jewish rites, had not a Jewish stranger stepped forward and said the kaddish, the Jewish prayer for the dead, over his coffin. Chagall is buried alongside his last wife Valentina "Vava" Brodsky Chagall, in the multi-denominational cemetery in the traditional artists' town of Saint-Paul-de-Vence, in the French region of Provence.

== Gallery ==
Marc Chagall, 1911, To My Betrothed, gouache, watercolor, metallic paint, charcoal, and ink on paper, mounted on cardboard, 61 × 44.5 cm, Philadelphia Museum of Art

Marc Chagall, 1911, I and the Village, oil on canvas, 192.1 × 151.4 cm, Museum of Modern Art, New York

Marc Chagall, 1911, A la Russie, aux ânes et aux autres (To Russia, Asses and Others), oil on canvas, 157 x 122 cm, Musée National d'Art Moderne, Centre Pompidou, Paris

Marc Chagall, 1911, Trois heures et demie (Le poète), Half-Past Three (The Poet) Halb vier Uhr, oil on canvas, 195.9 × 144.8 cm, The Louise and Walter Arensberg Collection, 1950, Philadelphia Museum of Art

Marc Chagall, 1911–12, Hommage à Apollinaire, or Adam et Ève (study), gouache, watercolor, ink wash, pen and ink and collage on paper, 21 × 17.5 cm

Marc Chagall, 1911–12, Le saint voiturier (The Holy Coachman), oil on canvas, 148 x 117.5 cm, private collection

Marc Chagall, 1913, Paris par la fenêtre (Paris Through the Window), oil on canvas, 136 × 141.9 cm, Solomon R. Guggenheim Museum, New York

Marc Chagall, 1913, La femme enceinte (Maternité), oil on canvas, 193 × 116 cm, Stedelijk Museum, Amsterdam

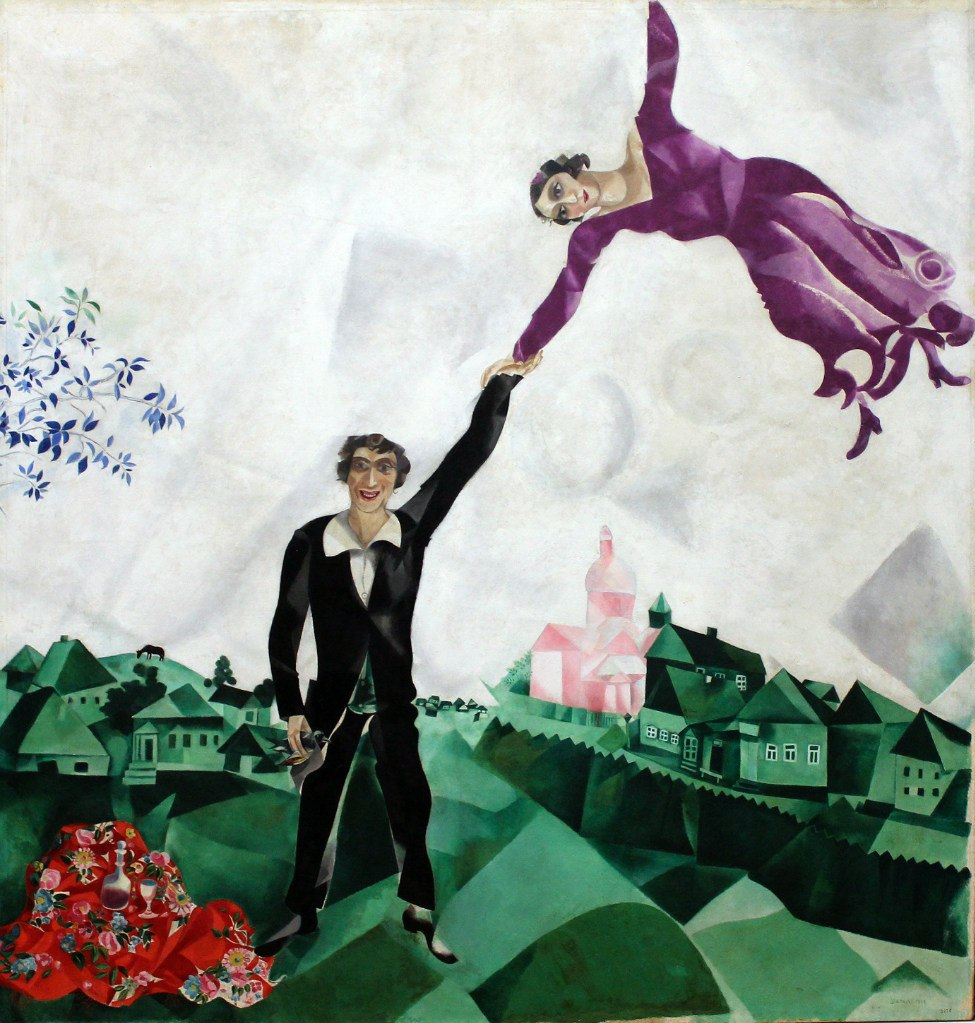
Marc Chagall, 1917, The Walk, oil on canvas, 170 × 163,5 cm, Russian Museum, St. Petersburg

== Catalogue raisonné ==
An online catalogue raisonné of the artist, in progress, was initiated in 2019 by the Association des Amis de Marc Chagall under the direction of Ambre Gauthier, in conjunction with the Archives Marc et Ida Chagall and the Marc Chagall Committee. Its online publication began in 2023 with the 97 sculptures made by Marc Chagall, then in 2024 with the addition of his 350 ceramics.

== Legacy and influence ==
Chagall biographer Jackie Wullschlager praises him as a "pioneer of modern art and one of its greatest figurative painters... [who] invented a visual language that recorded the thrill and terror of the twentieth century." She adds:

On his canvases we read the triumph of modernism, the breakthrough in art to an expression of inner life that ... is one of the last century's signal legacies. At the same time Chagall was personally swept up in the horrors of European history between 1914 and 1945: world wars, revolution, ethnic persecution, the murder and exile of millions. In an age when many major artists fled reality for abstraction, he distilled his experiences of suffering and tragedy into images at once immediate, simple, and symbolic to which everyone could respond.

Art historians Ingo Walther and Rainer Metzger refer to Chagall as a "poet, dreamer, and exotic apparition." They add that throughout his long life the "role of outsider and artistic eccentric" came naturally to him, as he seemed to be a kind of intermediary between worlds: "as a Jew with a lordly disdain for the ancient ban on image-making; as a Russian who went beyond the realm of familiar self-sufficiency; or the son of poor parents, growing up in a large and needy family." Yet he went on to establish himself in the sophisticated world of "elegant artistic salons."

Through his imagination and strong memories Chagall was able to use typical motifs and subjects in most of his work: village scenes, peasant life, and intimate views of the small world of the Jewish village (shtetl). His tranquil figures and simple gestures helped produce a "monumental sense of dignity" by translating everyday Jewish rituals into a "timeless realm of iconic peacefulness". Leymarie writes that Chagall "transcended the limits of his century. He has unveiled possibilities unsuspected by an art that had lost touch with the Bible, and in doing so he has achieved a wholly new synthesis of Jewish culture long ignored by painting." He adds that although Chagall's art cannot be confined to religion, his "most moving and original contributions, what he called 'his message', are those drawn from religious or, more precisely, Biblical sources."

Walther and Metzger try to summarize Chagall's contribution to art:

His life and art together added up to this image of a lonesome visionary, a citizen of the world with much of the child still in him, a stranger lost in wonder—an image which the artist did everything to cultivate. Profoundly religious and with a deep love of the homeland, his work is arguably the most urgent appeal for tolerance and respect of all that is different that modern times could make.

André Malraux praised him. He said: "[Chagall] is the greatest image-maker of this century. He has looked at our world with the light of freedom, and seen it with the colours of love."

=== Art market ===
A 1928 Chagall oil painting, Les Amoureux, measuring 117.3 x 90.5 cm, depicting Bella Rosenfeld, the artist's first wife and adopted home Paris, sold for $28.5 million (with fees) at Sotheby's New York, 14 November 2017, almost doubling Chagall's 27-year-old $14.85 million auction record.

In October 2010, his painting Bestiaire et Musique, depicting a bride and a fiddler floating in a night sky amid circus performers and animals, "was the star lot" at an auction in Hong Kong. When it sold for $4.1 million, it became the most expensive contemporary Western painting ever sold in Asia.

== Nazi-loot and restitution cases ==
The earliest court case in the United States related to Nazi-looted art involved a painting by Chagall, called variously L'Echelle de Jacob or Le Paysan et l'Echelle or The Peasant and the Ladder or Jacob's Ladder, which had been seized by the Einsatzstab Rosenberg (ERR) Nazi looting organisation from the Menzel apartment in Brussels in 1941 after the Jewish family fled the Nazis. In 1969 the widow Erna Menzel sued the US art collector Albert A. List, who had bought the painting from Perls Galleries in New York in 1955. In Menzel v List, the court awarded the Chagall painting to Menzel and ordered Klaus Perls to pay List the appreciated value of the painting.

In 2013, previously unknown works by Chagall were discovered in the stash of artworks hidden away by the son of one of Hitler's art dealers, Hildebrand Gurlitt. Chagall's Allegorical Scene was identified as having come from the collection of Savely Blumestein.

In 2022 France restituted The Father (Le Père) to the heirs of David Cender, a Polish-Jewish violin maker and luthier who survived Auschwitz where his wife and daughter were killed. According to the French culture ministry, Chagall had repurchased his own painting after the war not knowing its provenance, before it was donated to the French national collections in 1988.

In February 2024, the New York Times reported that the Museum of Modern Art in New York (MoMa) had secretly restituted Chagall's Over Vitebsk to the heirs of Franz Matthiesen in 2021, and that the restitution involved a $4 million payment to the museum. The painting had passed through the Nazi dealer Kurt Feldhausser and the Wehye Gallery and its provenance was disputed.

== Theatre ==
In the 1990s, Daniel Jamieson wrote The Flying Lovers of Vitebsk, a play concerning the life of Chagall and partner Bella. It has been revived multiple times, most recently in 2020 with Emma Rice directing a production which was live-streamed from the Bristol Old Vic and then made available for on-demand viewing, in partnership with theaters around the world. This production had Marc Antolin in the role of Chagall and Audrey Brisson playing Bella Chagall; produced during the COVID epidemic, it required the entire crew to quarantine together to make the live performance and broadcast possible.

In 2022, James Sherman wrote Chagall in School, a play concerning Chagall's leadership of the Vitebsk Art College. It premiered in Chicago at Theatre Wit with Georgette Verdin directing a production by Grippo Theatre Company. This production had John Drea in the role of Chagall and Yourtana Sulaiman playing Berta (Bella) Chagall. The production was well-received, with designer Erin Pleake winning a Non-Equity Jeff Award for Projection Design.

== Exhibitions and tributes ==
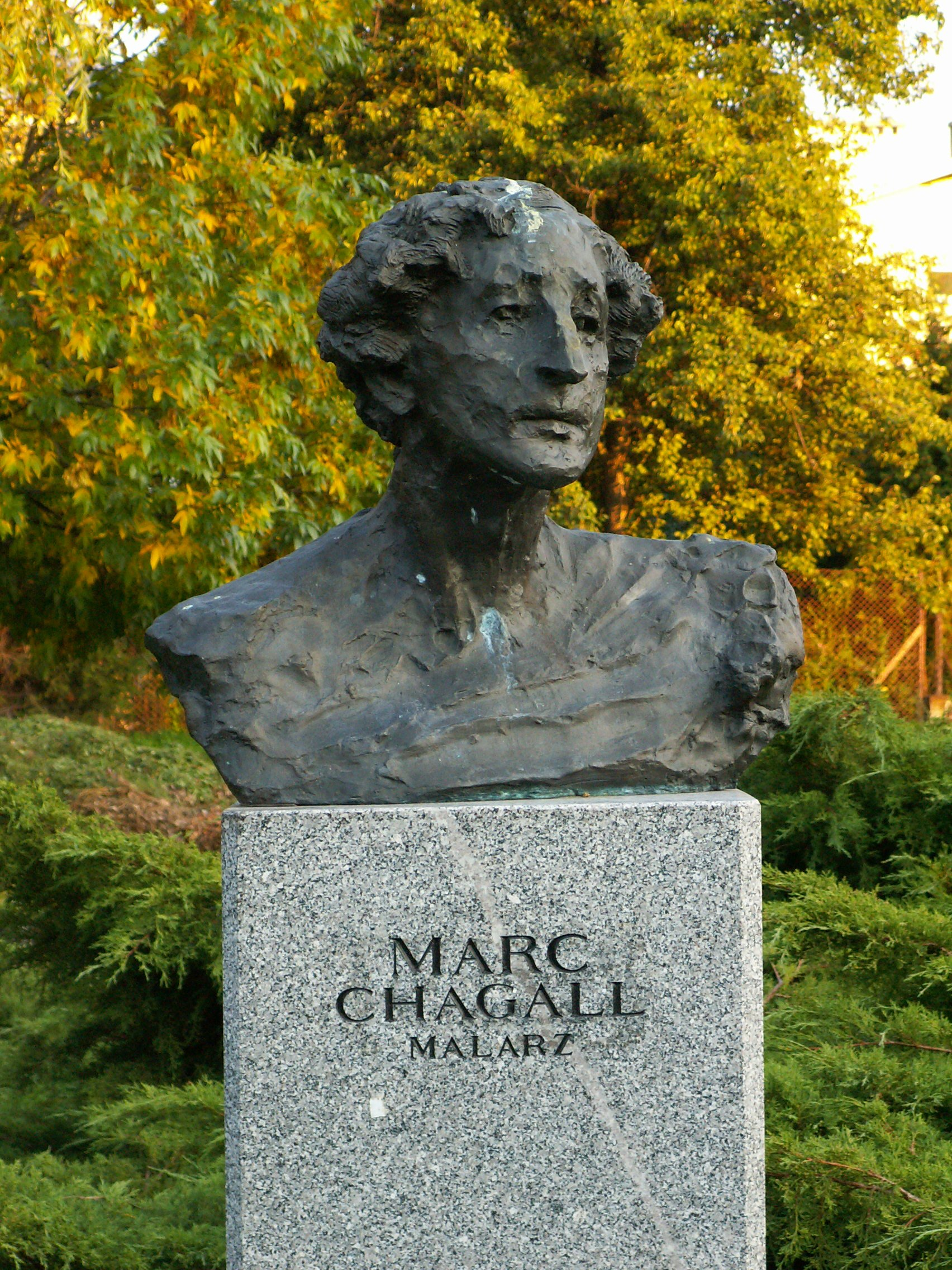
Bust of Marc Chagall in Celebrity Alley in Kielce (Poland)

During his lifetime, Chagall received several honors:

- In 1960, Brandeis University awarded Marc Chagall an honorary degree in Laws, at its 9th Commencement.
- In 1977, the city of Jerusalem bestowed upon him the Yakir Yerushalayim (Worthy Citizen of Jerusalem) award.
- Also in 1977, the government of France awarded him its highest honour, the Grand-Croix de la Legion d'honneur.
- 1974: Member of the Royal Academy of Science, Letters and Fine Arts of Belgium.

1963 documentary

Chagall, a short 1963 documentary, features Chagall. It won the 1964 Academy Award for Best Short Subject Documentary.

Postage stamp tributes

Because of the international acclaim he enjoyed and the popularity of his art, a number of countries have issued commemorative stamps in his honor depicting examples from his works. In 1963 France issued a stamp of his painting, The Married Couple of the Eiffel Tower. In 1969, Israel produced a stamp depicting his King David painting. In 1973 Israel released a 12-stamp set with images of the stained-glass windows that he created for the Hadassah Hebrew University Medical Center Synagogue; each window was made to signify one of the "Twelve Tribes of Israel".

In 1987, as a tribute to recognize the centennial of Chagall's birth, seven nations engaged in a special omnibus program and released postage stamps in his honor. First, Antigua & Barbuda, Dominica, The Gambia, Grenada and Grenada Grenadines produced 48 stamps and 10 souvenir sheets. Then Ghana and Sierra Leone released sets of four stamps and one souvenir sheet. Although the stamps all portray his various masterpieces, the names of the artwork are not listed on the stamps.

Exhibitions

There were also several major exhibitions of Chagall's work during his lifetime and following his death.

- In 1967, the Louvre in Paris exhibited 17 large-scale paintings and 38 gouaches, under the title of "Message Biblique", which he donated to the nation of France on condition that a museum was to be built for them in Nice. In 1969 work began on the museum, named Musée National Message Biblique Marc Chagall. It was completed and inaugurated on 7 July 1973, on Chagall's birthday. Today it contains monumental paintings on biblical themes, three stained-glass windows, tapestries, a large mosaic and numerous gouaches for the "Bible series."
- From 1969 to 1970, the Grand Palais in Paris held the largest Chagall exhibition to date, including 474 works. The exhibition was called "Hommage a Marc Chagall", was opened by the French President and "proved an enormous success with the public and critics alike."
- The Dynamic Museum in Dakar, Senegal held an exhibition of his work in 1971.
- In 1973, he traveled to the Soviet Union, his first visit back since he left in 1922. The Tretyakov Gallery in Moscow had a special exhibition for the occasion of his visit. He was able to see again the murals he long ago made for the Jewish Theatre. In Leningrad, he was reunited with two of his sisters, whom he had not seen for more than 50 years.
- In 1982, the Moderna Museet in Stockholm, Sweden organized a retrospective exhibition which later traveled to Denmark.
- In 1985, the Royal Academy in London presented a major retrospective which later traveled to Philadelphia. Chagall was too old to attend the London opening and died a few months later.
- From 15 January - 11 April 1999, the Fundación Juan March, Madrid exhibited Marc Chagall. Jewish Traditions. The show exhibited paintings and other works in oil created between 1909 and 1976. The exhibit traveled to Fundació Caixa Catalunya, Barcelona (26 April - 4 July 1999).
- In 2003, a major retrospective of Chagall's career was organized by the Réunion des Musées Nationaux, Paris, in conjunction with the Musée National Message Biblique Marc Chagall, Nice, and the San Francisco Museum of Modern Art.
- In 2007, an exhibition of his work titled "Chagall of Miracles", was held at Il Complesso del Vittoriano in Rome, Italy.
- The regional art museum in Novosibirsk had a Chagall exhibition on his biblical subjects between 16 June 2010 and 29 August 2010.
- The Musée d'art et d'histoire du judaïsme in Paris had a Chagall exhibition titled "Chagall and the Bible" in 2011.
- The Luxembourg Museum in Paris held a Chagall retrospective in 2013.
- The Jewish Museum in New York City has held multiple exhibitions on Chagall including the 2001 exhibit "Marc Chagall: Early Works from Russian Collections" and the exhibit 2013 "Chagall: Love, War and Exhile."
- Schirn Kunsthalle Frankfurt "World in Turmoil" with paintings from the 1930s and 1940s between 4 November 2022 to 19 February 2023.

Current exhibitions and permanent displays

Montréal Muséum of Fine Arts, Musée des Beaux-Arts de Montréal. 28 January – 11 June 2017. Chagall: Colour and Music is the biggest Canadian exhibition ever devoted to Marc Chagall.

- Chagall's work is housed in a variety of locations, including the 'Palais Garnier' (the Opera de Paris), Art Institute of Chicago, Chase Tower Plaza of downtown Chicago, Metropolitan Opera, Metz Cathedral, Notre-Dame de Reims, Fraumünster abbey in Zürich, Switzerland, Church of St. Stephan in Mainz, Germany and the Musée Marc Chagall Nice, France, which Chagall helped to design.
- The only church in the world with a complete set of Chagall window-glass is All Saints Church in the tiny village of Tudeley, in Kent, England.
- Twelve stained-glass windows are part of Hadassah Hospital Ein Kerem in Jerusalem, Israel. Each frame depicts a different tribe.
- In the United States, the Union Church of Pocantico Hills contains a set of Chagall windows commemorating the prophets, which was commissioned by John D. Rockefeller Jr.
- Lincoln Center in New York City, contains Chagall's huge murals; The Sources of Music and The Triumph of Music are installed in the lobby of the new Metropolitan Opera House, which began operation in 1966. Also in New York, the United Nations Secretariat Building has a stained glass wall of his work. In 1967 the UN commemorated this artwork with a postage stamp and souvenir sheet.
- The family home on Pokrovskaya Street, Vitebsk, is now the Marc Chagall Museum.
- The Museum of Biblical Art, Dallas, Texas has one of the largest collections of Chagall works on paper, hosting continuously holding rotating Chagall exhibitions.
- The Marc Chagall Yufuin Kinrin-ko Museum in Yufuin, Kyushu, Japan, holds about 40–50 of his works.
- Marc Chagall's late painting titled Job for the Job Tapestry in Chicago.
- Wycliffe College at the University of Toronto is presenting Marc Chagall and the Bible, May to October 2023.

Other tributes

During the closing ceremony of the 2014 Winter Olympics in Sochi, a Chagall-like float with clouds and dancers passed by upside down hovering above 130 costumed dancers, 40 stilt-walkers and a violinist playing folk music.

== See also ==
- School of Paris
- Jewish culture
- Menzel v. List
