= Hip Ornament: Leopard Head =

'Hip Ornament: Leopard Head'
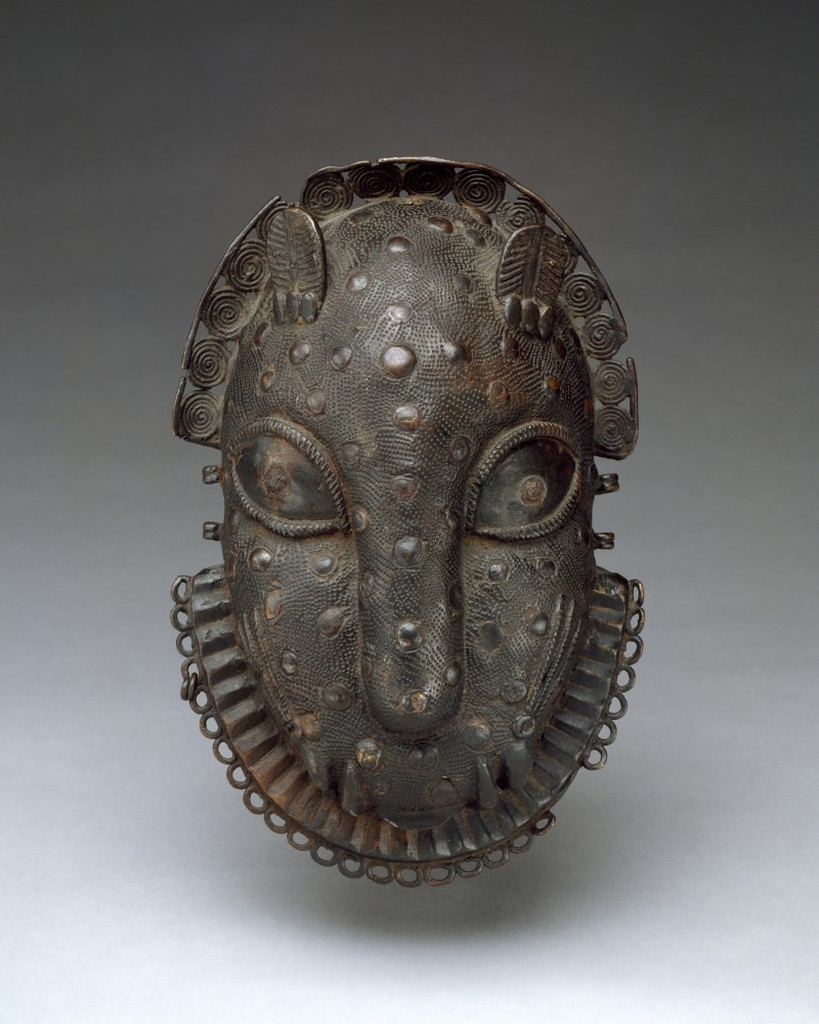
- Year: 16th -19th century
- Medium: Brass, Iron
- Dimensions: H. 7 5/16 × W. 4 3/4 × D. 2 1/4 in. (18.6 × 12.1 × 5.7 cm)
- Location: The Metropolitan Museum of Art

This leopard head hip ornament was made by the Edo people of the Court of Benin, Nigeria sometime between the 16th to 19th centuries. It is made of brass and iron and was created using the traditional lost-wax casting technique. Hip ornaments such as this one would have been worn as part of elaborate ceremonial costumes by the king and other participants of palace rituals. This piece was made to be worn on the left side of the waist to cover the closure of wrapped skirts. It would have been held in place by large loops on the top, bottom, or back of the ornament. The leopard was of special importance so it was only to be worn by the king and war chiefs.

== Visual description ==
This piece is a metal oval shaped hip ornament that depicts a leopard head with a snout, sharp teeth, large heavily outlined slanted eyes, three raised lines depicting whiskers, and ears. It is highly decorated with tiny indents covering the whole head as well as larger smooth dots. The smooth raised dots are the remnants of copper tacks that were inset to the wax before casting. The top of the piece is surrounded by a row of swirls and the bottom is a fluted collar with a row of small metal loops. These metal loops would have been used to attach small metal rattles called crotals.

== Background ==
The Kingdom of Benin is now located in modern day Nigeria and is now known as Benin City. It is located in the tropical rain forests of southern Nigeria. Royal art in the Kingdom of Benin was made to glorify the Oba, the divine king who was the primary patron of the arts. The elaborate ceremonial costumes that hip ornaments are a part of originated from Oba Ewuare. Brass casting was almost exclusively at the command of the Oba and consisted mainly of ritual and ceremonial objects. Brass and other metals were used as symbols of permanence.

Most hip ornaments depict human faces. The leopard was considered to be the counterpart of the Oba and was seen as terrifying, but also symbolized a leader. Because of this symbolism only the Oba and war chiefs could wear leopard ornaments. They were seen as protective badges of honor and also a symbol of the power over life and death that the Oba had given the chiefs. This particular hip ornament displays the conventions used for leopards during this period in Benin art: overlapping fangs, three whiskers, slanted eyes, and leaf shaped ears. This hip ornament also resembles pectoral masks in that it has decorative flanges above and below the face with two lugs on each side.

== Provenance ==
This piece originated in the Court of Benin and was created sometime between the 16th and 19th centuries. It was then taken by the British military in 1897 when they were on a punitive expedition and took thousands of pieces of art from the Kingdom of Benin. It was at the J.C. Steven’s auction in 1900, before it was acquired by James T. Hooper around 1945 in Oxford, UK. It was noted to be present at the British auction house Christie's in 1976. It was part of the collection of the American art dealer Klaus Perls in 1981. Perls and his wife donated it to the Metropolitan Museum of Art in 1991.
