= Menzel v. List =

- Court: New York Court of Appeals
- Full case name: Menzel v. List
- Argued: January 7, 1969
- Decided: February 26, 1969
- Citations: Menzel v. List, 24 N.Y.2d 91, 298 N.Y.S.2d 979, 246 N.E.2d 742 (N.Y. 1969)

Court membership
- Chief judge: ARTHUR G. KLEIN, J.

Menzel v. List was a landmark restitution case involving Nazi looted art.

It was filed by the widow Erna Menzel whose art collection was seized from the Menzel apartment in Brussels in 1941 after the Jewish family fled the Nazis. Menzel's attempt to recover her artworks through litigation was the first such case in the United States and is considered a landmark case that is widely cited.

== The events leading up to the lawsuit ==
Mr. and Mrs Menzel fled the Nazis in 1941, going from Belgium to the United States. When they returned to the apartment after the end of WWII, they discovered a receipt from the Einsatzstab Rosenberg, a Nazi looting organization, for a painting by Marc Chagall called variously L'Echelle de Jacob or Le Paysan et l'Echelle or The Peasant and the Ladder or Jacob's Ladder that the Nazis had seized.

The Menzels looked unsuccessfully for the stolen Chagall. After Mr. Menzel died in 1960, Erna Menzel continued to search. She found a mention of the Chagall in a catalog in 1962 and contacted the possessor, the American art collector Albert A. List, informing him that the artwork had been seized by the Nazis from her collection and requesting its return. List, who said he had bought the painting from Perls Galleries in New York in 1955 and was unaware of its history, refused to return it. Menzel filed a lawsuit, which was known as Menzel v. List. Klaus Perls, the owner of Perls Gallery, was named as a third party defendant. List also filed suit against Perls. Perls, a refugee from the Nazis, and a former head of the Art Dealers' Association of America, also said he did not know that Chagall had been looted.

== Landmark lawsuit, landmark decision ==
The restitution claim was the first of its kind in the United States and as such gained considerable legal and media attention. In addition to concerning the theft of artwork by a Nazi looting organisation in a country occupied by Nazi Germany during World War II, it also posed important issues for the art world.

The New York Times called it a "classic legal domino game".

In 1966, the Supreme Court of New York decided in favor of Mrs. Menzel in the first restitution case of its kind.

Mrs Menzel's lawsuit made history and it is cited in numerous articles and books, including A Legal Primer on Managing Museum Collections and Museums in Motion: An Introduction to the History and Functions of Museums.
