= Klaus Perls =

German art dealer

Klaus Gunther Perls (1912–2008) was born in Berlin, Germany, where his parents were art dealers. He studied art history in Munich, but after the Nazis stopped granting degrees to Jews he moved to Basel, Switzerland and completed his studies. Here, he wrote a dissertation on the 15th-century French painter Jean Fouquet.

== Early career ==
His father Hugo Perls had fled Germany and separated from his mother who set up as an art dealer in Paris.

In 1935, after two years in Paris, Klaus moved to New York City and opened the Perls Galleries on East 58th Street near Madison Avenue. Initially, he dealt in works by Maurice Utrillo, Maurice de Vlaminck and Raoul Dufy; artists that his mother recommended to him from Paris. When she was forced to flee France, he began dealing in contemporary American artists, including Darrel Austin, and in Mexican and South American art.

== Middle years ==
In 1940, Klaus married Amelia Blumenthal from Philadelphia, and she became a partner in the gallery. After the war, the Perlses focused on French art from the School of Paris. They moved their gallery to a town house at 1016 Madison Avenue, near 78th Street, where they lived on the upper floors in 1954. They worked there until 1997. Perls was one of the founders, with Perls, of the Art Dealers Association of America.

In addition to preparing monographs on Fouquet, Vlaminck and Rufino Tamayo, Perls wrote catalogues raisonnés for the artists Chaïm Soutine and Jules Pascin. He also wrote an impassioned letter to The New York Times in 1939, defending the representational work by Picasso that was, at the time, being savaged by critics of an exhibition at the Museum of Modern Art. In the letter he wrote: "If the public would take the trouble to spend as much time in the presence of Picasso's art as they spend in the presence of good music, they would come to like it just as much,". The couple dealt primarily in modern works from the School of Paris, but also represented Alexander Calder beginning in 1954.

In 1955, Perls was sued in a dispute over the ownership of a painting by Chagall that he had sold to the collector Albert A List. Erna Menzel claimed it has been seized from her apartment in Brussels in 1941 by the Nazis; Perls said he did not know that Chagall had been looted.

== Later life ==
In the 1970s, Perls developed an interest in art from the Benin Empire and built an important collection. He donated 153 pieces of African royal art from Benin to the Metropolitan Museum of Art, which are in the Michael Rockefeller Wing, in 1991. The donated collection comprised bronze figures, elephant tusks carved with royal figures, musical instruments, decorative masks and jewelry.

In 1996, the Perls further donated 13 works by Picasso, Amedeo Modigliani, Georges Braque, Fernand Léger, Soutine and Pascin to the Metropolitan. That gift was one of the largest ever received by the Metropolitan's department of 20th-century art and greatly helped round out the museum's collection. Two were from 1910, Picasso's Nude in an Armchair and Braque's oval Candlestick and Playing Cards on a Table, and the third was Picasso's Still Life with Pipes from 1912. The gift also included several Picassos from the 1930s, notably Sleeping Nude with Flowers and Girl Asleep at a Table. Klaus Perls was subsequently named honorary trustee of the Metropolitan Museum. The Perls Foundation was set up after the Perls Gallery closed in 1997.

In 1990, art thieves removed a glass dome from atop the Perls Gallery and stole a 1962 mobile designed by Alexander Calder valued at $1.4 million.

His wife Amelia, better known as Dolly, died in 2002. She was also a Trustee of the Metropolitan Museum of Art.

== Dismissed posthumous legal challenge ==
In 2010 lawsuit filed by the Calder Estate, dismissed with prejudice by the New York Supreme Court on December 23, 2013, Klaus Perls was accused of fraud. In a revised 2013 complaint filed in New York State Supreme Court, the Calder estate argued the Perlses surreptitiously held on to hundreds of Calder's works and swindled the artist's estate out of tens of millions of dollars. In response, the Perls family asked the court to dismiss the case, arguing that the charges were completely false, and claimed that Perls and Calder were close friends for decades. The New York court dismissed the complaint with prejudice, writing that "all of these allegations are so patently inadequate that the court can only conclude that they were brought solely for the purposes of harassment or embarrassment, without any consideration of their legal sufficiency."

== See also ==
Menzel v. List
