= Wynton Marsalis discography =

This is the discography of jazz musician and composer Wynton Marsalis.

== As leader ==
=== Studio albums ===
List of studio albums, with selected chart positions and certifications
Title	Album details	Peak chart positions		Certifications
Title	Album details	US	US Jazz	Certifications
Wynton Marsalis	Released: January 8, 1982; Label: CBS	165	—	
Think of One	Released: October 11, 1983; Label: Columbia	102	1	
Hot House Flowers	Released: December 18, 1984; Label: CBS	90	1	RIAA: Gold
Black Codes (From the Underground)	Released: June 9, 1985; Label: Columbia	118	2	
J Mood	Released: October 14, 1986; Label: Columbia	185	3	
Marsalis Standard Time, Vol. I	Released: September 8, 1987; Label: Columbia	153	2	RIAA: Gold
The Majesty of the Blues	Released: June 13, 1989; Label: Columbia	—	3	
Crescent City Christmas Card	Released: October 3, 1989; Label: Columbia	—	—	
Standard Time, Vol. 2: Intimacy Calling	Released: 1990; Label: Columbia	112	1	
Standard Time, Vol. 3: The Resolution of Romance	Released: May 15, 1990; Label: CBS	101	1	
Thick in the South: Soul Gestures in Southern Blue, Vol. 1	Released: July 30, 1991; Label: Columbia	—	1	
Uptown Ruler: Soul Gestures in Southern Blue, Vol. 2	Released: July 30, 1991; Label: Columbia	—	6	
Levee Low Moan: Soul Gestures in Southern Blue, Vol. 3	Released: July 30, 1991; Label: Columbia	—	8	
Blue Interlude	Released: May 19, 1992; Label: Columbia	—	—	
Portraits By Ellington (as leader of Jazz at Lincoln Center Orchestra)	Released: September 22, 1992; Label: Columbia	—	—	
Citi Movement	Released: January 26, 1993; Label: Columbia	—	2	
In This House, On This Morning	Released: March 22, 1994; Label: Columbia	—	—	
Blood on the Fields (as leader of Jazz at Lincoln Center Orchestra)	Released: June 17, 1997; Label: Columbia	—	1	
Standard Time, Vol. 5: The Midnight Blues	Released: April 28, 1998; Label: Columbia	—	1	
Standard Time, Vol. 4: Marsalis Plays Monk	Released: April 21, 1999; Label: Columbia, Sony Classical	—	3	
Big Train (as leader of Jazz at Lincoln Center Orchestra)	Released: July 1, 1999; Label: Columbia, Sony Classical	—	12	
Standard Time, Vol. 6: Mr. Jelly Lord	Released: September 7, 1999; Label: Columbia	—	7	
Listen to the Storytellers (with Joshua Bell, Orchestra of St. Luke's, Robert Sadin)	Released: September 7, 1999; Label: Sony Classical	—	—	
Reeltime	Released: November 2, 1999; Label: Sony Classical	—	6	
The Marciac Suite	Released: August 22, 2000; Label: Columbia	—	—	
The Magic Hour	Released: March 9, 2004; Label: Blue Note	—	—	
A Love Supreme (as leader of Jazz at Lincoln Center Orchestra)	Released: January 11, 2005; Label: Palmetto	—	—	
Don’t Be Afraid: The Music of Charles Mingus (as leader of Jazz at Lincoln Center Orchestra)	Released: October 18, 2005; Label: Palmetto	—	—	
Here...Now	Released: January 1, 2007; Label: N/A	—	—	
From the Plantation to the Penitentiary	Released: March 6, 2007; Label: Blue Note	—	2	
Congo Square (as leader of Jazz at Lincoln Center Orchestra)	Released: November 21, 2007; Label: Jazz at Lincoln Center	—	—	
He and She	Released: March 24, 2009; Label: Blue Note	—	6	
Christmas Jazz Jam	Released: October 9, 2009; Label: Compass Productions	125	6	
Portrait in Seven Shades (as leader of Jazz at Lincoln Center Orchestra)	Released: February 2, 2010; Label: Jazz at Lincoln Center	—	—	
Vitoria Suite (as leader of Jazz at Lincoln Center Orchestra)	Released: October 19, 2010; Label: Emarcy	—	8	
Winter Wonderland	Released: November 30, 2018; Label: Blue Engine	—	—	
Jazz and Art (as leader of Jazz at Lincoln Center Orchestra)	Released: August 2, 2019; Label: Blue Engine	—	15	
Jazz For Kids (as leader of Jazz at Lincoln Center Orchestra)	Released: October 18, 2019; Label: Blue Engine	—	—	
Rock Chalk Suite (as leader of Jazz at Lincoln Center Orchestra)	Released: March 20, 2020; Label: Blue Engine	—	—	
The Ever Fonky Lowdown (as leader of Jazz at Lincoln Center Orchestra)	Released: August 21, 2020; Label: Blue Engine	—	15	
A Swingin’ Sesame Street Celebration (as leader of Jazz at Lincoln Center Orchestra)	Released: October 30, 2020; Label: Blue Engine	—	—	
The Democracy! Suite (as leader of Jazz at Lincoln Center Orchestra Septet)	Released: January 15, 2021; Label: Blue Engine	—	—	

=== Collaborative studio albums ===
List of collaborative albums, with selected chart positions
Title	Album details	Peak chart positions	
Title	Album details	US Class.	US Jazz
Haydn, Hummel, L. Mozart: Trumpet Concertos (with National Philharmonic Orchestra)	Released: June 28, 1983; Label: CBS Masterworks	—	—
Wynton Marsalis Plays Handel, Purcell, Torelli, Fasch, and Molter (with English Chamber Orchestra)	Released: November 25, 1984; Label: CBS Masterworks	—	—
Tomasi, Jolivet: Trumpet Concertos (with London Philharmonic Orchestra)	Released: June 27, 1986; Label: CBS Masterworks	—	—
Carnaval (with Eastman Wind Ensemble)	Released: March 17, 1987; Label: CBS Masterworks	—	—
Baroque Music for Trumpets (with English Chamber Orchestra)	Released: June 28, 1988; Label: CBS Masterworks	—	—
Works by Husa, Copland, Vaughan Williams, and Hindemith (with Eastman Wind Ensemble)	Released: May 30, 1989; Label: CBS Masterworks	—	—
Haydn: Three Favorite Concertos (with National Philharmonic Orchestra)	Released: October 25, 1990; Label: CBS Masterworks	—	—
Baroque Duet (with Kathleen Battle and Orchestra of St. Luke's)	Released: April 21, 1992; Label: Sony Classical	36	—
On the Twentieth Century (with Judith Lynn Stillman)	Released: September 21, 1993; Label: Sony Classical	—	—
The London Concert (with English Chamber Orchestra)	Released: November 8, 1994; Label: Sony Classical, Legacy	—	—
Joe Cool's Blues (with Ellis Marsalis Jr.)	Released: April 18, 1995; Label: Columbia	—	3
In Gabriel's Garden (with English Chamber Orchestra)	Released: May 10, 1996; Label: Sony Classical	2	—
A Fiddler's Tale (with musicians from the Chamber Music Society of Lincoln Center)	Released: June 15, 1999; Label: Sony Classical	—	—
At The Octoroon Balls - String Quartet No. 1 (with Orion String Quartet)	Released: June 15, 1999; Label: Sony Classical	—	—
All Rise (as leader of the Lincoln Center Jazz Orchestra, with Los Angeles Philharmonic)	Released: October 1, 2002; Label: Sony Classical	—	—
A Jazz Celebration (with The Marsalis Family)	Released: April 15, 2003; Label: Marsalis Music	—	—
The Abyssinian Mass (as leader of the Lincoln Center Jazz Orchestra, with Chorale Le Chateau)	Released: March 18, 2016; Label: Blue Engine	—	5

=== Live albums ===
List of live albums, with selected chart positions
Title	Album details	Peak chart positions		
Title	Album details	US	US Blues	US Jazz
Live at Blues Alley	Released: June 21, 1988; Label: Columbia	—	—	2
A Carnegie Hall Christmas Concert (with Kathleen Battle, Frederica von Stade and André Previn)	Released: October 6, 1992; Label: Sony Classical	—	—	—
Concert for Planet Earth (with Plácido Domingo and various artists)	Released: December 8, 1992; Label: Sony Classical	—	—	—
The Fire Of The Fundamentals	Released: January 25, 1994; Label: Columbia	—	—	—
They Came to Swing (as leader of Jazz at Lincoln Center Orchestra)	Released: July 26, 1994; Label: Columbia	—	—	—
Live In Swing City - Swingin’ with Duke	Released: March 30, 1999; Label: Columbia	—	—	—
Live at the Village Vanguard	Released: December 6, 1999; Label: Columbia	—	—	18
Selections From the Village Vanguard Box	Released: April 4, 2000; Label: Columbia	—	—	—
Live at the House of Tribes	Released: August 30, 2005; Label: Blue Note	—	—	5
Two Men With The Blues (with Willie Nelson)	Released: July 8, 2008; Label: Blue Note	20	—	1
From Billie Holiday to Edith Piaf (with Richard Galliano)	Released: June 21, 2010; Label: Future Acoustic, Rampart Street	—	—	—
Music Redeems (with The Marsalis Family)	Released: August 24, 2010; Label: Marsalis Music	—	—	—
Here We Go Again: Celebrating the Genius of Ray Charles (with Willie Nelson)	Released: March 29, 2011; Label: Blue Note	—	—	1
Play the Blues: Live from Jazz at Lincoln Center (with Eric Clapton)	Released: September 13, 2011; Label: Reprise	31	1	—
Live in Cuba (as leader of Jazz at Lincoln Center Orchestra)	Released: August 21, 2015; Label: Blue Engine	—	—	2
Big Band Holidays (as leader of Jazz at Lincoln Center Orchestra)	Released: October 30, 2015; Label: Blue Engine	—	—	6
The Music of John Lewis (as leader of Jazz at Lincoln Center Orchestra, with Jon Batiste)	Released: March 24, 2017; Label: Blue Engine	—	—	3
Handful of Keys (as leader of Jazz at Lincoln Center Orchestra, with various artists)	Released: September 15, 2017; Label: Blue Engine	—	—	4
United We Swing: Best of The Jazz at Lincoln Center Galas (with various artists)	Released: March 23, 2018; Label: Blue Engine	—	—	2
Una Noche con Rubén Blades (as leader of Jazz at Lincoln Center Orchestra, with Rubén Blades)	Released: October 19, 2018; Label: Blue Engine	—	—	5
Swing Symphony (as leader of Jazz at Lincoln Center Orchestra, with St. Louis Symphony)	Released: July 1, 2019; Label: Blue Engine	—	—	—
Big Band Holidays II (as leader of Jazz at Lincoln Center Orchestra)	Released: October 25, 2019; Label: Blue Engine	—	—	5
Sherman Irby’s Inferno (as leader of Jazz at Lincoln Center Orchestra)	Released: January 17, 2020; Label: Blue Engine	—	—	—
The Music of Wayne Shorter (as leader of Jazz at Lincoln Center Orchestra, with Wayne Shorter)	Released: January 31, 2020; Label: Blue Engine	—	—	—
Christopher Crenshaw’s The Fifties: A Prism (as leader of Jazz at Lincoln Center Orchestra)	Released: May 1, 2020; Label: Blue Engine	—	—	—
Black, Brown & Beige (as leader of Jazz at Lincoln Center Orchestra)	Released: May 6, 2020; Label: Blue Engine	—	—	—

=== Compilation albums ===
List of compilation albums, with selected chart positions
Title	Album details	Peak chart positions	
Title	Album details	US Class.	US Jazz
Portrait of Wynton Marsalis	Released: September 20, 1988; Label: Sony Classical	—	—
Resolution to Swing	Released: January 1, 1993; Label: Columbia	—	—
Classic Wynton	Released: October 31, 1998; Label: Sony Classical	9	—
Popular Songs: The Best of Wynton Marsalis	Released: July 31, 2001; Label: Columbia	—	25
The Essential Wynton Marsalis	Released: July 10, 2007; Label: Sony Classical	—	—
Standards & Ballads	Released: January 22, 2008; Label: Columbia, Legacy	—	6
Swingin’ Into the 21st Box Set	Released: October 18, 2011; Label: Sony, Legacy	—	—
Selections From Swinging Into The 21st	Released: October 18, 2011; Label: Sony, Legacy	—	22
The Music of America: Wynton Marsalis	Released: January 24, 2012; Label: Sony, Masterworks Jazz	—	21
The Spiritual Side of Wynton Marsalis	Released: October 22, 2013; Label: Columbia, Legacy	—	15

=== Soundtrack albums ===
List of soundtrack albums, with selected chart positions
Title	Album details	Peak chart positions	
Title	Album details	US Class.	US Jazz
Tune in Tomorrow	Released: September 20, 1990; Label: CBS	—	8
Jump Start and Jazz	Released: September 2, 1997; Label: Sony Classical	12	—
Sweet Release & Ghost Story	Released: August 10, 1999; Label: Sony Classical	—	—
Unforgivable Blackness: The Rise and Fall of Jack Johnson	Released: November 30, 2004; Label: Blue Note	—	12
Bolden	Released: April 19, 2019; Label: Blue Engine	—	2
Motherless Brooklyn (with various artists)	Released: August 21, 2019; Label: WaterTower Music	—	—

== As sideman ==
With Art Blakey

- Live at Montreux and Northsea (Timeless, 1980)
- Art Blakey in Sweden (Amigo, 1981)
- Album of the Year (Timeless, 1981)
- Straight Ahead (Concord, 1981)
- Keystone 3 (Concord Jazz, 1982)
- Live At Bubba's Jazz Restaurant (Who's Who in Jazz, 1983)

With Branford Marsalis

- Mo' Better Blues (soundtrack) (Columbia, 1990)
- The Beautyful Ones Are Not Yet Born (album) (Sony, 1991)
- Romare Bearden Revealed (Marsalis Music, 2003)

With Shirley Horn

- You Won't Forget Me (1991, Verve) – rec. 1990
- Here's to Life (1992, Verve) – rec. 1991

With others

- Chico Freeman, Destiny's Dance (Contemporary, 1982) – rec. 1981
- Dizzy Gillespie, To Diz with Love (Telarc, 1992)
- Herbie Hancock, Quartet (CBS/Sony, 1982) – rec. 1981
- Joe Henderson, Lush Life: The Music of Billy Strayhorn (1992) – rec. 1991
- Elvin Jones, Tribute to John Coltrane "A Love Supreme" (Columbia, 1992)
- The Modern Jazz Quartet, MJQ & Friends: A 40th Anniversary Celebration (Atlantic, 1994) – rec 1993–1994
- Frank Morgan, Mood Indigo (Antilles, 1989)
- Ted Nash, Rhyme & Reason (Arabesque, 1999)
- Marcus Roberts, Deep in the Shed (credited as E. Dankworth) (Novus, 1990)
- The Sachal Ensemble, Song of Lahore (Universal, 2016)
