= Bart Maris =

Belgian trumpet player (born 1965)

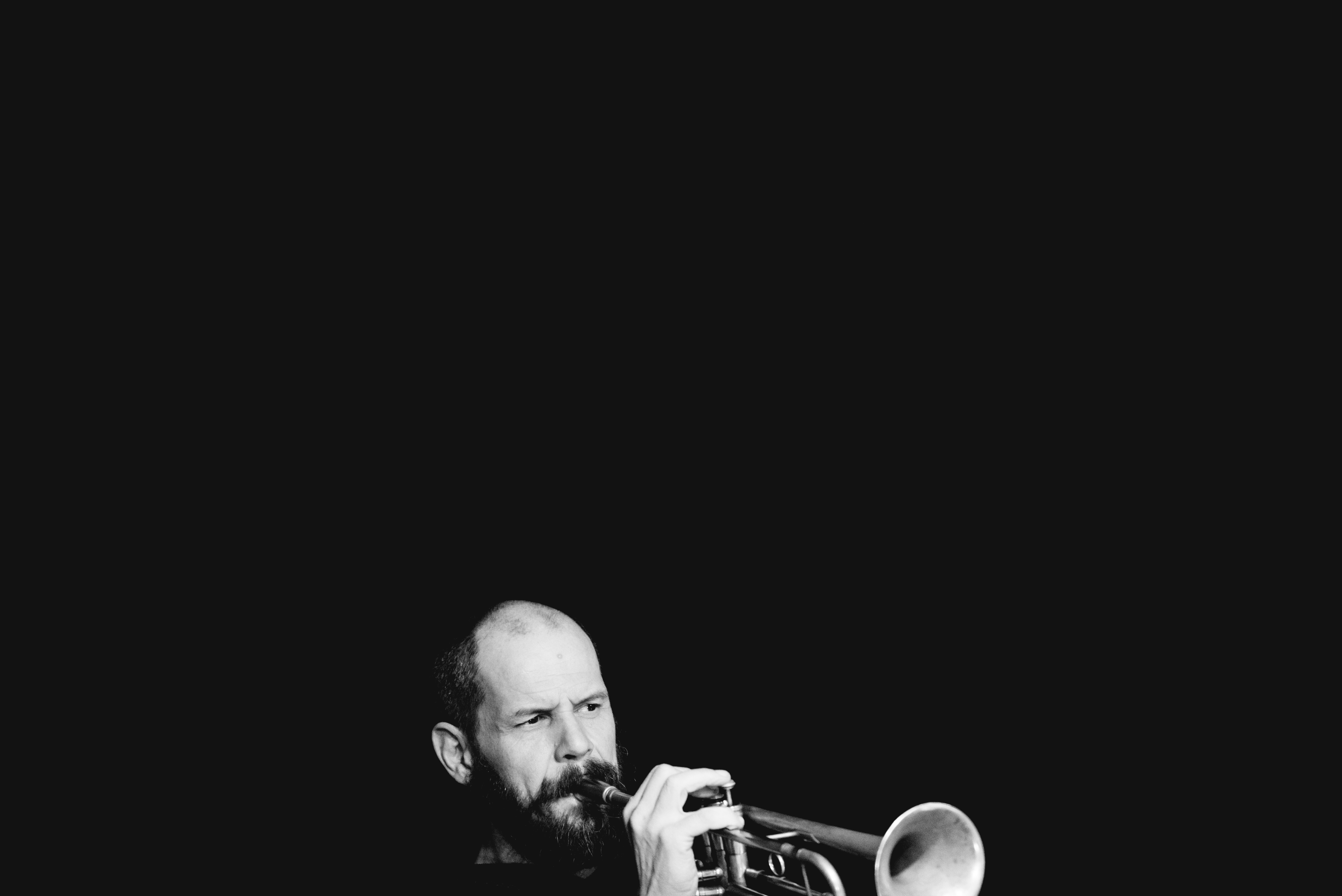

Background information
- Born: Bart Maris; 28 December 1965 (age 60); Ninove, East Flanders, Belgium
- Genres: Free Jazz, experimental, free improvisation, contemporary rock
- Occupations: Musician, Composer, Guest Professor of Improvisation at School of Arts in Ghent
- Instruments: Trumpet, Fluegelhorn, Piccolo trumpet, Electronics
- Years active: 1984–present
- Labels: Crammed Discs, Sub Rosa, Setola di Maiale, Negocito Records, Quark Records, Leo Records, Red Toucan Records, Skycap records, Choux de Bruxelles records, Kinky Star Records, knitting Factory Records, WIM PRO Records, De Werf

Bart Maris is a Belgian trumpet player. He has performed in a very large number of bands, either as a group member or a guest musician on records or in concert.

== Acts ==
Bart Maris was one of the original members of:

- Fukkeduk with Niek Roseeuw, Kristof Roseeuw, Tom Dewulf, Jan Kuijken, Rik Verstrepen, Frank Gijsels.
- Gerard Van Dongen Kwintet with Joe Williamson, Tom Wouters, Henk Bakker. He was in KAMIKAZE, with Tom Wouters, Filip Wauters, Kristof Roseeuw.
- X-Legged Sally with Peter Vermeersch, Pierre Vervloesem, Danny Van Hoeck, Pol Belgrado and Jean-luc Plouvier and later Peter Van Den Berghe.

He join the following after their creation:

- Think of One, with Roel Poriau, Erik Morel, Tobe Wouters, Thomas Desmedt, David Bové and the Flat Earth Society.
- Jaune Toujours, with his brother Piet Maris
- Electric Barbarian
- Synaesthetic Trip by Edward Perraud, with Benoit Delbecq (piano), and Arnault Cuisinier (bass), or in duo with Edward Perraud, Victor Toth Tercett with Matyas Szandai (bass), Robert Ikiz (drums),
- 1000 from Jan Klare (alto sax/ flute/clarinets) (munster-Germany) and Wilbert de Joode (bass) (Netherlands), Michael Vatcher (drums) (USA).

Other bands played with on a regular basis include rock, and dance, bands as The Whodads, Janez Dedt, The Groove Cartel, Muziekmaatschappij Excelsior, Arno, Corrie Van Binsbergen, The Simpletones, Das Kammer Orchestra (founded by Piet Jorens), Rouppe Group with Ab Baars, Klaas Hekman, Wilbert de Joode, Verian Weston and the Folk Big-Band Olla Vogala. His contributions can be heard on dozens of CDs by Belgian rock bands such as Dead Man Ray (Berchem), dEUS (In a Bar under the Sea, The Ideal Crash), Gorky (Monstertje) and Zita Swoon (Sunrise/), but also on discs by international artists such as Art Zoyd Armagedon for lille 2004, Symphonie pour le jour ou bruleront les cites with orchestre national de lille, Fred Frith, Stone, Brick, Glass, Wood, Wire, Salvatore Adamo, ( (Zanzibar (2003), Un soir au Zanzibar (2004)), Univers Zero Rhythmix – 2002, and Marc Moulin (Into the dark (2001)), Soplarte by Charlotte Van Wouwe, performing on glass trumpets, performing with the Michiel Braam (Trio and Bik Band Braam), Blast from Frank Crijns, Italian Band Cani Di Trufola, John Watts (from Fischer-Z). He joins in every time with the 'beukorkest' by Rik Van Iersel with the Dutch/American crew with folks like Woody&Paul, Jonnhy Dowd, Def-P from Osdorp Posse, André Manuel Stuurbaard Bakkebaard, Gary Lucas, Jozef van Wissem, Kyteman. He was with John Zorn in s'hertogenbosch on the opening of the Toonzaal and Dick van der Harst in his Banda Azufaifo and his big ouverture for Klangwolke in Linz and with George De Decker in a hommage piece to René Magritte, and the music for the Belgium TV series Recht op Recht, and also an orchestral piece for solo trumpet and guitar, Roland Van Campenhout. For occasion he performed with Jean-Luc Capozzo and Werni und Jendreiko, and was recently invited by Fred Van Hove to perform with Evan Parker, Peter Brötzmann, Ken Vandermark, Els Vandeweyer and Andre Goudbeek. Touring with Joost Buis and Tobias Delius, Jan Willem Van Der Ham, Alan Purves, Achim Kaufmann, performing in France with "69", a hardcore impro band with Jean Luc Guionnet, Jean-Phi Morel, Frank Vaillant, Edward Perraud, Frank Gaily, playing with Va Fan Fahre a Ghent-based Balkan/klezmer/Arab-band touring all over Europe, and Pandouring newborn Antwerp fanfare. In 2013/2014 he co-produced the Stromae hit Tous les mêmes.

He also did a lot of theatre (L King of Pain by Luc Perceval), not only making the music, but also actively participating in the play, as in Aan Tafel, from Luc Nys, with Peter Gorissen and Some Voices with Antonio Tavares, and Virgula with Luanda and Pablo Casella and Giovanni Barcella. And music for dance, for David Hernandez Box, Meg Stuart It's about Time and as bandmember of X-Legged Sally in the Ultima Vez performances "Bereft of a Blisfull Union" (1996) and "Her Body Doesn't Fit Her Soul" (1993) by Wim Vandekeybus.

He performs with his own bands, and playing solo:

- Les poubelles with Filip Wauters (guitars) and Tom Wouters (drums)
- p'tits cons/'tklein verbruik with Stefaan Blancke (trombone) and Roel Poriau (zabumba)
- Loops is a solo program with taperecordersmachines giving him the full background of a symphonical orchestra
- GLITS is a duo with pianist Peter Van Den Berghe, around his compositions.

He has played for 5 years in duo with cellist Lode Vercampt and created a whole repertoire for this special setting.

He has weekly sessions in the hotclub De gand in Ghent (groentenmarkt), hosting all the people on tour with off-days like Jimmy Tenor, Josh Berman, Jozef Dumoulin, Teun Verbruggen, Too Noisy Fish, Hasse Poulsen, 1000, I Am So Me, Peter Jacqmyn, Verian Weston, Fred Lohnberg-holm, Els Vandeweyer, de beren gieren, Zeger Vandenbussche...

He is also a Guest Professor of improvisation at the School of Arts in Ghent.

== Records ==
- Fukkeduk – Ornitozozy
- X-Legged Sally – Immer das Selbe Gelogen (1991)
- X-Legged Sally – Killed by Charity (1993)
- X-Legged Sally – Eggs and Ashes (1994)
- X-Legged Sally – The Land of the Giant Dwarfs (1995)
- X-Legged Sally – Fired (1996)
- X-Legged Sally – Bereft of a Blissful Union (1997)
- Marc Moulin- Top Secret (2001)
- Nanook of the North – André Goudbeek (1995)
- In A Bar, Under The Sea – dEUS (1996)
- Monstertje – Gorki (1996)
- Einfach – The Simpeltones
- Univers Zero – Rhythmix (2002)
- Juggernaut – Think of One (1997)
- Music Inspired by Sunrise – Zita Swoon (1997)
- Marrakech Emballages Ensemble – Think of One (1998)
- Berchem – Dead Man Ray (1998)
- The Ideal Crash – dEUS (1999)
- Marrakech Emballages Ensemble II – Think of One (2000)
- Naft – Think of One (2000)
- Naft 2 – Think of One (2002)
- Marrakech Emballages Ensemble 3 – Think of One (2003
- Olla Vogala – live (1998) (MAP Records)
- Olla Vogala – Gnanomo (1999) (ZOKU-EMI)
- Jaune Toujours – Brusk (2000) (WBM21014)
- Jaune Toujours – Camping del Mundo (2002) (chou 0202)
- Jaune Toujours – Barricade (2004) (chou 0402)
- Jaune Toujours – cluB (2006) – cd+DVD – (chou 0604)
- Jaune Toujours – Kolektiv (2009) (chou 0604)
- Jaune Toujours – Re:Plugged (2010) (chou 1002)
- Stone, brick, glass, wood, wire (Graphic scores 1986-96) – Fred Frith (1999) (I Dischi di Angelica – IDA 014)
- The purple cucumber Zappa-project, (rino records, limited edition) with Muffinmen, Robert Martin and the Flemish Radio Orchestra,
- Novembermusic – Visual conductions by Butch Morris together with Palinckx and ensemble Aquarius
- Novembermusic (NM007) 2003, with Tobias Delius, Paul Lovens, Pat Thomas, Maartje Ten Hoorn
- A sophisticated face (cueniform records rune 125) 1999 with Blast
- Stringy rugs (cuneiform records rune 95) 1997 with 'Blast'
- Nanook of the north (wimprodrie cd130895) with Andre Goudbeek (as), Kris Duerinckx (dr), Remco Devroede (p)
- As it happened (wimprovijf) with Phil Minton (voc), Andre Goudbeek (as), Peter Jacquemain (b), Dirk Wouters (d)
- Ghost Note trio, MV947° 2000 with Eddy Loozen (p), Eric Donvil (dr)
- Mixed Frequencies – MLB (Muzieklab Brabant) with Edward Capel(as)
- Music for Speakers, with Music for speakers
- Gerard Van Dongen Kwintet (vandongencd1-C7975) 1999 with Vandongen5
- Over de bergen (brokkenrecords br004) 2010 with Corrie Van Binsbergen
- Scarlett road-house (downsall plastics DSL036) 2006 with Briskey
- Live at the Ancienne Belgique (terra notta001) 2008, with Briskey Big Band
- Before-during-after (terra notta 002) 2009 with Briskey
- Home made (carbon7 006) 1994 with Pierre Vervloesem
- Fiasco (carbon7 019) 1996, with Pierre Vervloesem
- Singt Friedrich Hollaender (LC03779) 2007, with Patricia Beysens
- Bongo Festeris (KS 029 kinky star) with The Whodads
- Les Banquets Nomades (agora) with Les Banquets Nomades
- Hawai five-O (ks ?) with The Whodads
- Romski Robbery (zephyrus records) 2005, Vafanfahre
- Zet je ook maar (zephyrus records) 2007, Vafanfahre
- Al'Wa'debt (zephyrus records) 2010, Vafanfahre
- New shah (rikordings13) 2005, with Rik Van Iersel, Peter Jacquemyn, Victor snytsheuvel
- Kleine hausmeister (MRCD206) 2008, with Het Beukorkest
- Aprimi Ciclick-records www.ciclic-records.org (ciclic0001) (2005)
- Castigo Stasimon (in process concert III) (ciclic0010) (2006)
- High Roof Low Roof (ciclic0017) 2007, with Assif Tsahar, Peter Jaquemain, Tatsuya Nakatane.
- L'edera, il colle, e la nebbia (Setola di Maiale) 2007 with Gianni Gebbia (as), Stefano Giust, Xabier Iriondo
- Juanita K (R.A.T.005) 2006 with Rackham
- Double best of (Piasb142) 2003, Stellla
- What do you mean (jukebox cd1) 1998, with Magic Ballet Ensemble
- Cosmic Relief (KS 012) 1999, with Magic Ballet Ensemble
- Hell (KS 030) 2000 with Magic Ballet Ensemble www.kinkystar.com
- Car-music (rythmbug001) with Yutakasa
- Ultralove (Universal Music Belgium) 2002 with Cartel Deluxe,
- Zanzibar (Emi)2006 Salvatore Adamo
- En Chile (2DVD-EMI) 2004) with Salvatore Adamo
- En Chile (2CD-EMI597385/2) 2004) with Salvatore Adamo
- Un soir au Zanzibar (DVD-EDV17) 2004 with Salvatore Adamo
- Geodeck 'Recht op recht (2000–2001) George Dedecker teevee-sequal
- Lodewijk de koningspinguin (LCM100072) with Benjamin Boutreur
- Happy New Ears (festival voor nieuwe muziek kortrijk/lille- with loops live) 2004
- Flat Earth Society – Live at the Beursschouwburg 1999 (1999)
- Flat Earth Society – Bonk (2000)
- Flat Earth Society – Larf (2001)
- Flat Earth Society – Minoes (2002)
- Flat Earth Society – Trap (2002)
- Flat Earth Society – Armstrong Mutations (2003)
- Flat Earth Society – ISMS (2005)
- Flat Earth Society – Heliogabal (zonk records) (2006)
- Flat Earth Society – Die Austernprizessin DVD (crammed disc)
- Flat Earth Society – Psychoscout (crammed disc 128)
- Flat Earth Society – Cheer me, perverts! (2009)
- Flat Earth Society – Answer Songs (2009)
- Flat Earth Society – 13 (2013)
- Flat Earth Society – TERMS OF EMBARRASSMENT (2016)
- Electric Barbarian – El
- Electric Barbarian – Minirock From The Sun
- Moker – KONGLONG – W.E.R.F. Records.
- Moker – Overstroomd – W.E.R.F. Records.
- Moker – LOVENDEGEM – LIVE IN LIMELIGHT
- Moker – MOKER (el negocito records)
- 1000 – unplayable (leo records)
- 1000 – playable (skycap records)
- 1000 – Shoe (Red Toucan Records)
- 1000 – Butterfly Garden (el negocito records)
- 69 – 69 (quark records)
- synaesthetic trip – edward perraud (Quark records)
- Beyond the predictable touch – synaesthetic trip – edward perraud (Quark records)
- Hipsters Gone Ballistic – spinifeX maXimus (www.trytone.org)
- popping bopping – Victor Toth Tercett (bmc cd 191)
- Cani di Trifola – ANCHE SE MANCA L'ARIA (el nogocito production 2011)
- Transparency-Wolk 3, cd (2006, Rikordings #19) – with Rik van Iersel, Han Bennick, P Jacomyn, Terrie Ex
