= X-Legged Sally =

Belgian rock/jazz band

- Origin: Belgium
- Years active: 1988–1997
- Spinoffs: Flat Earth Society
- Past members: Peter Vermeersch; Pierre Vervloesem; Bart Maris for full list, see members

X-Legged Sally (XLS) is a Belgian avant-garde rock/jazz-band founded in 1988 by composer Peter Vermeersch, and disbanded in 1997. They were one of the first bands from Belgium to combine a set of very different musical styles (jazz, rock, improvisation and classical), becoming a starting point for the Belgian indie music scene that developed in the nineties.

== Biography ==
Initially, X-Legged Sally was formed to compose and perform the music Peter Vermeersch wrote for dance productions, such as Immer das Selbe Gelogen (Always the Same Lies), released as a live cd in 1991. Vermeersch' composing style was becoming too demanding for the constraints of sheet music such as was used in his earlier band Maximalist!. From the beginning, improvisation played an important role in XLS' songs. The first X-Legged Sally concert took place in November 1988. Soon, XLS became a band in its own right, although there would be cooperations with dance ensembles throughout the existence of the group.

Based on the international success of Maximalist!, X-Legged Sally had the chance to perform in the New York avant-garde Jazz club Knitting Factory, and a live track was included in the recording Live at the Knitting Factory, vol. 4 (1990). The New York connection proved fruitful, as the two first XLS recordings, Slow-Up (1991) and Killed by Charity (1993) were both produced by Bill Laswell. This also meant international attention and distribution, a rare thing for Belgian bands in the early nineties.

The third full album, Eggs and Ashes (1994), contained music written earlier for three different dance productions of Wim Vandekeybus' company Ultima Vez: Immer das Selbe Gelogen (1991), Her body doesn't fit her soul (1993) and Mountains made of barking (1994). This cd is also notorious for featuring the young Mauro Pawlowski on vocals in the waltz Lulu.

The music of X-Legged Sally was now slowly evolving into a more 'mature' sound. Larger concepts, melodious tunes and more vocals appeared in the next album, The Land of the Giant Dwarfs (1995). But by now, the musicians were also evolving into different directions, and on April 20, 1996 the band performed their farewell concert at the Cactus Club in Bruges. This concert was recorded by Radio 1 and released as Fired. It was not, however, their last cd, as 1997 saw the release of Bereft of a Blissful Union, once again an accompaniment to a dance production by Wim Vandekeybus from 1996.

The members of X-Legged Sally spread out in various musical directions, although mutual cooperations still happen. Peter Vermeersch founded A Group (together with Pierre Vervloesem), and later the Flat Earth Society, Eric Sleichim started Bl!ndman, and Pierre Vervloesem featured in a lot of bands and has a productive solo career.

== Members ==
- Peter Vermeersch
- Pierre Vervloesem
- Bruno Deneuter
- Paul Belgrado
- Bart Maris
- Eric Sleichim
- Michel Mast
- Jean-Luc Plouvier
- Peter Vandenberghe
- Danny Van Hoeck
- Pieter Lamot
- Michel Delory
- Jan Weuts
- Thierry Mondelaers

== Discography ==
- Live at the Knitting Factory, vol. 4 (1990) (contains 1 live track)
- Slow-Up (1991)
- Immer das Selbe Gelogen (1991) ('music performed by X-Legged Sally')
- Killed By Charity (1993)
- Eggs and Ashes (1994)
- The Land of the Giant Dwarfs (1995)
- Fired (1996)
- Bereft of a Blissful Union (1997)
