= Two Men with the Blues =

Live album by Willie Nelson and Wynton Marsalis
- Released: July 8, 2008
- Recorded: January 12–13, 2007
- Venue: Lincoln Center, New York City
- Genre: Jazz
- Length: 53:26
- Label: Blue Engine
- Producer: Delfeayo Marsalis

Willie Nelson chronology
Moment of Forever (2008)	Two Men with the Blues (2008)	Willie and the Wheel (2009)

Wynton Marsalis chronology
Standards and Ballads (2008)	Two Men with the Blues (2008)	He and She (2009)

Professional ratings
Review scores
Source	Rating
AllMusic	4.5/5 stars
St. Joe News-Press	4.5/5 stars

Two Men with the Blues is a live album by Willie Nelson and Wynton Marsalis. It was released on July 8, 2008, by Blue Note and sold 22,000 copies in it first week of release. It was recorded on January 12–13, 2007, at Jazz at Lincoln Center in New York City.

== Track listing ==
No.	Title	Writer(s)	Length
1.	"Bright Lights, Big City"	Jimmy Reed	5:20
2.	"Night Life"	Willie Nelson	5:44
3.	"Caldonia"	Fleecie Moore	3:25
4.	"Stardust"	Hoagy Carmichael	5:08
5.	"Basin Street Blues"	Spencer Williams	4:56
6.	"Georgia on My Mind"	Hoagy Carmichael, Stuart Gorrell	4:40
7.	"Rainy Day Blues"	Willie Nelson	5:43
8.	"My Bucket's Got a Hole in It"	Clarence Williams	4:56
9.	"Ain't Nobody's Business"	Porter Grainger, Everett Robbins	7:27
10.	"That's All"	Merle Travis	6:08
11.	"Down by the Riverside"		8:12

== Personnel ==
- Wynton Marsalis – trumpet and vocals
- Willie Nelson – vocals and guitar
- Walter Blanding – saxophone
- Dan Nimmer – piano
- Mickey Raphael – harmonica
- Carlos Henriquez – bass
- Ali Jackson – drums

== Charts ==
The album held the number one position in the Billboard Jazz Albums chart for four weeks. It spent a total of 67 weeks on that chart. It peaked at number 20 on both the Billboard 200 and the Billboard Digital Albums charts, spending eight weeks and one week on the charts respectively.

Chart	Provider(s)	Peak position
Billboard 200 (U.S.)	Billboard	20
Billboard Top Jazz Albums (U.S.)	Billboard	1
German Albums Chart	IFPI	63
New Zealand Albums Chart	RIANZ	13
