= Christmas Jazz Jam =

Studio album by Wynton Marsalis
- Released: October 9, 2009
- Recorded: January 6–7, 2009
- Genre: Christmas; jazz
- Length: 68:31
- Label: Compass Productions
- Producer: Jeff Jones

Wynton Marsalis chronology
| He and She (2009) | Christmas Jazz Jam (2009) | Portrait in Seven Shades (2010) |

Christmas Jazz Jam is a Christmas album by Wynton Marsalis that was released in 2009 by Compass Productions. Musicians on the album include Wessell Anderson on alto saxophone, Vincent Gardner and Wycliffe Gordon on trombone, Victor Goines on tenor & soprano saxophone and clarinet, and Herlin Riley on drums.

== Background and composition ==
Christmas Jazz Jam marked Marsalis' first holiday album in twenty years. For the album, Marsalis assembled a group of ten musicians to perform uncredited arrangements of twelve holiday standards. Following "Mary Had a Baby" are traditional New Orleans jazz-style renditions of "Jingle Bells" (James Pierpont) and "Blue Christmas" (Billy Hayes, Jay W. Johnson).

== Reception ==
Professional ratings
Review scores
| Source | Rating |
|---|---|
| Los Angeles Times | 3/4 stars |

Kirk Silsbee of the Los Angeles Times awarded the album three of four stars and called the arrangements "smart yet not ostentatious".

In 2009, the album reached peak positions of number six on Billboard's Jazz Albums chart, number nine on the Top Holiday Albums chart, and number nineteen on the Top Independent Albums chart. In 2010 the album reached number 125 on the Billboard 200.

== Track listing ==
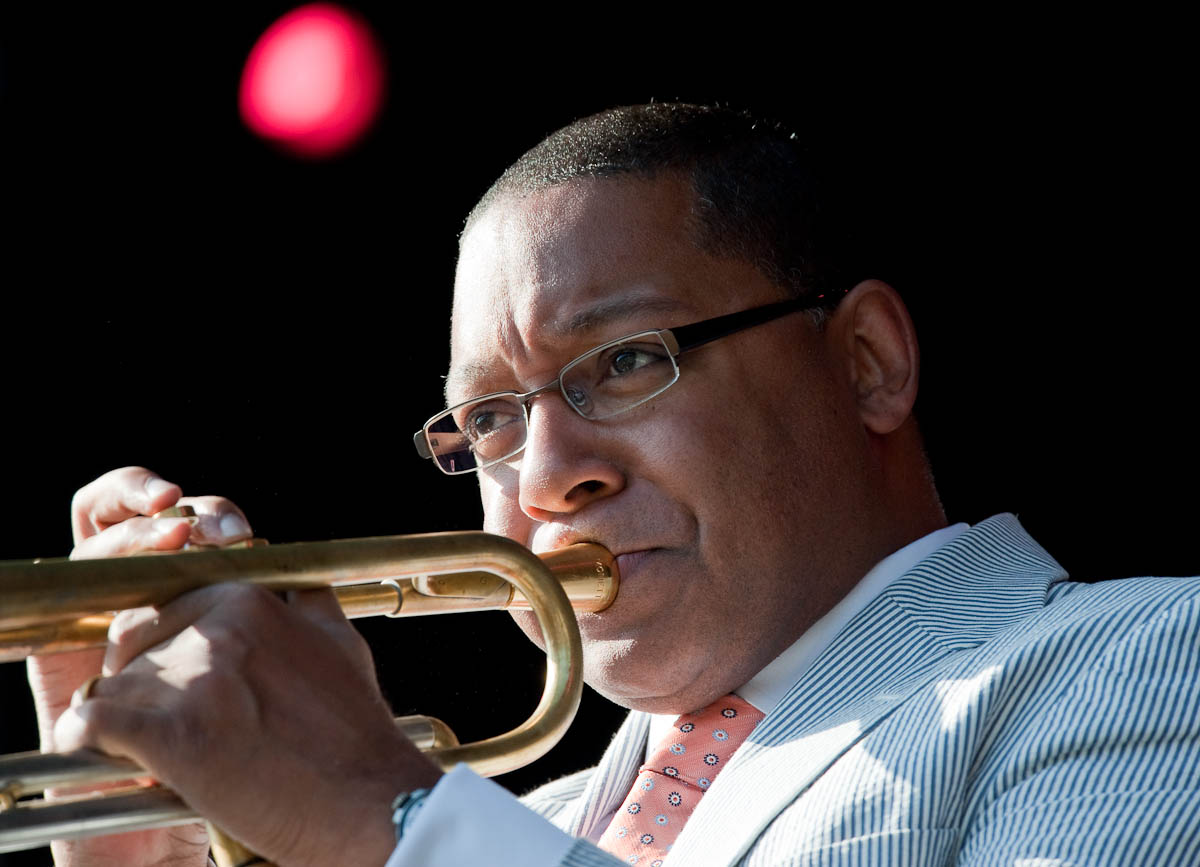
Wynton Marsalis performing in 2009

1. "Santa Claus Is Coming to Town" (John Frederick Coots, Haven Gillespie) – 4:50
2. "Mary Had a Baby" – 4:03
3. "Jingle Bells" (James Pierpont) – 4:43
4. "Blue Christmas" (Billy Hayes, Jay W. Johnson) – 5:24
5. "Go Tell It on the Mountain" (John Wesley Work Jr.) – 7:08
6. "O Christmas Tree" (Ernst Anschutz) – 7:25
7. "O Little Town of Bethlehem" (Phillips Brooks) – 7:21
8. "Rudolph the Red-Nosed Reindeer" (Johnny Marks) – 6:05
9. "The Christmas Song" (Mel Torme, Robert Wells) – 5:30
10. "Good King Wenceslas" (Thomas Helmore, John Mason Neale) – 6:49
11. "Have Yourself a Merry Little Christmas" (Hugh Martin, Ralph Blane) – 7:08
12. "Greensleeves" (traditional) – 2:05

== Charts ==
In 2009 Christmas Jazz Jam reached peak positions of number six on Billboard's Jazz Albums chart, number nine on the Top Holiday Albums chart, and number nineteen on the Top Independent Albums chart. In 2010 the album reached number 125 on the Billboard 200.

| Chart (2009) | Peak position |
|---|---|
| Billboard Jazz Albums | 6 |
| Billboard Top Holiday Albums | 9 |
| Billboard Top Independent Albums | 19 |
| Chart (2010) | Peak position |
| Billboard 200 | 125 |

== Personnel ==
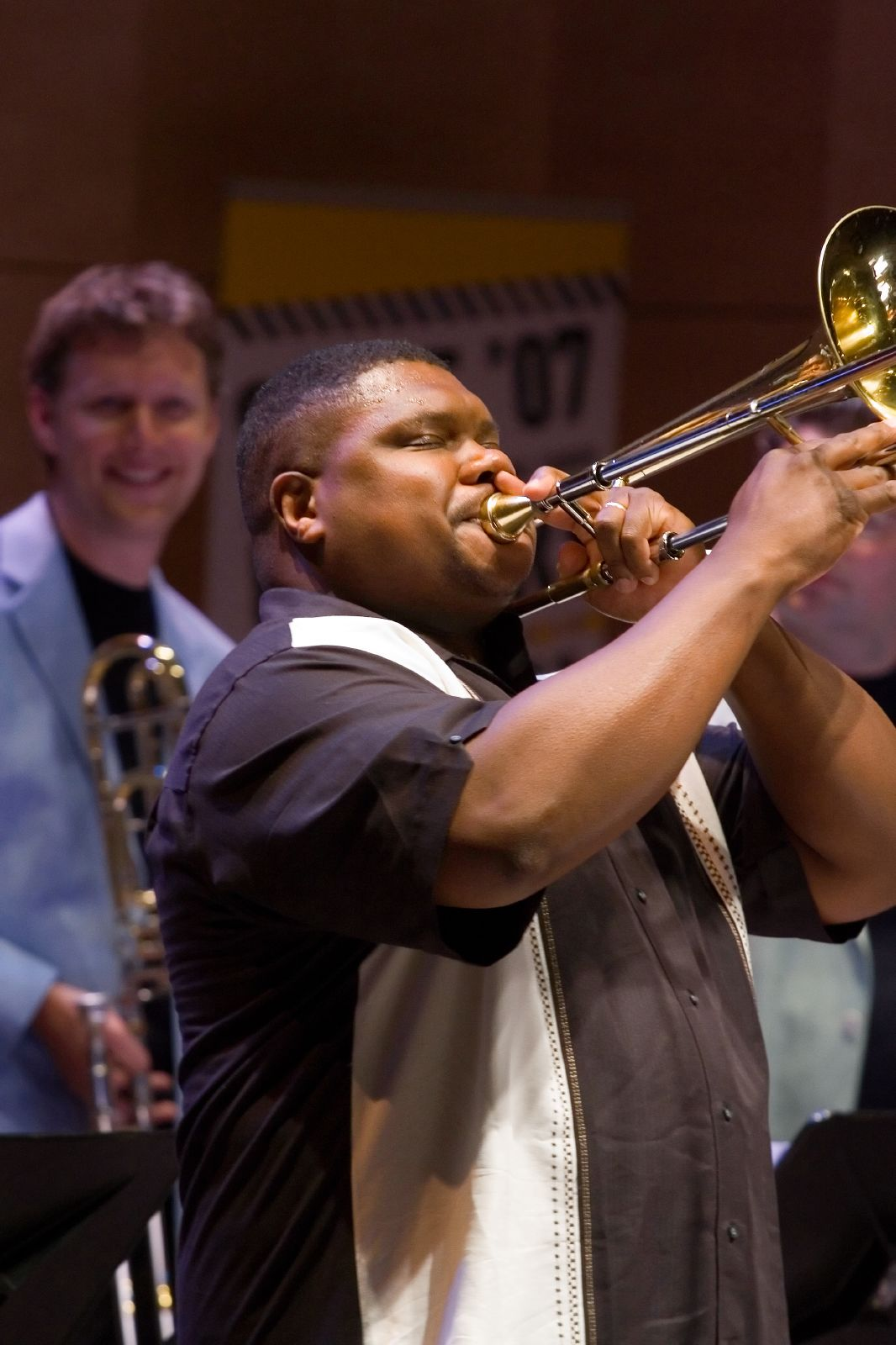
Wycliffe Gordon

- Wynton Marsalis – trumpet
- Victor Goines – soprano saxophone, tenor saxophone, clarinet
- Walter Blanding – soprano saxophone, tenor saxophone
- Wessell Anderson – alto saxophone
- Paul Nedzela – baritone saxophone, bass clarinet
- Vincent Gardner – trombone
- Wycliffe Gordon – trombone, tuba
- Reginald Veal – double bass
- Herlin Riley – drums
- Dan Nimmer – piano
- Don Vappie – banjo, guitar; vocals (tracks 4 & 9)
- Roberta Gumbel – vocals (tracks 2 & 7)

Technical

- Jeff Jones – producer
- Joanne Levey – assistant producer
- Jason Dale – engineer
- Justin Gerrish – assistant engineer
- Fernando Lodeiro – assistant engineer
- Evan Manners – assistant engineer
- Shinobu Mitsuoka – assistant engineer

== See also ==
- Best-selling Christmas/holiday albums in the United States
- Christmas carol
- List of Christmas carols
- Wynton Marsalis discography
