= Dan Nimmer =

American jazz pianist and composer (born 1982)

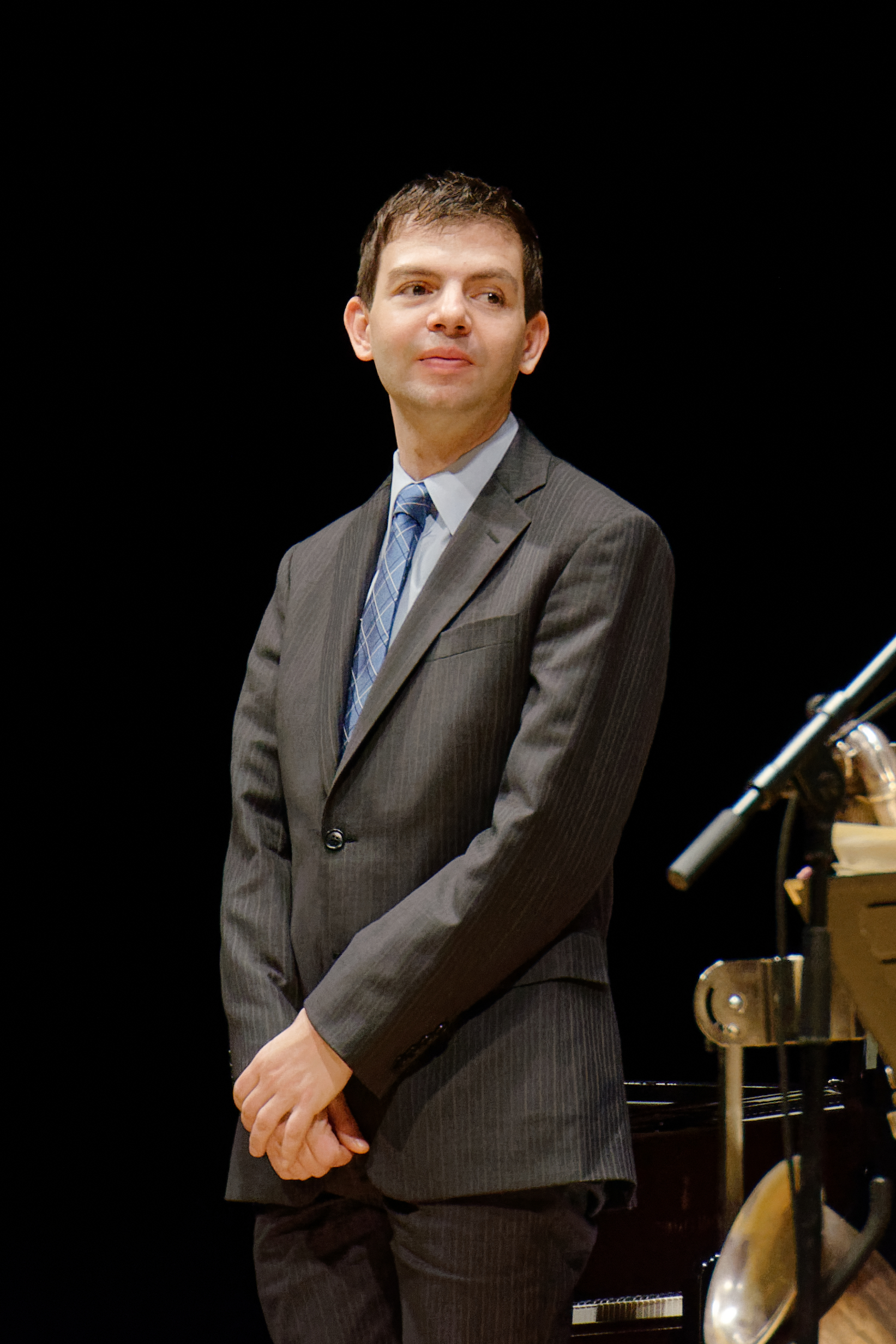
- Dan Nimmer with Jazz at Lincoln Center Orchestra - Lyon 2016

Background information
- Born: 1982 (age 43–44); Milwaukee, Wisconsin, U.S.
- Genres: Jazz
- Occupations: Musician, composer
- Instrument: Piano
- Years active: Early 2000s–present
- Website: dannimmer.com

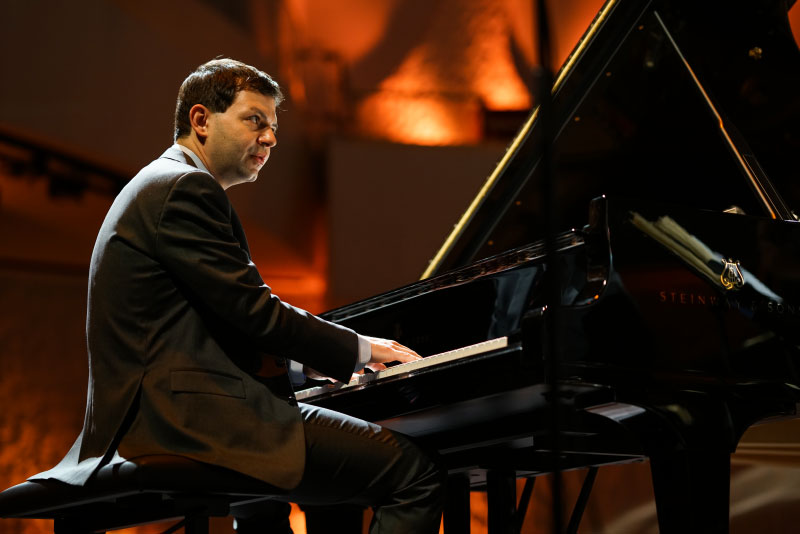
Dan Nimmer in Aalborg (Denmark 2020) playing with Jazz at Lincoln Center Orchestra

Dan Nimmer (born 1982) is an American jazz pianist and composer.

== Early life ==
Nimmer was born in Milwaukee, Wisconsin, in 1982. He started playing the piano by ear. He had classical music lessons, and studied jazz at the Wisconsin Conservatory of Music from the age of 15. His parents also took him to hear local musicians perform, and he had the opportunity to play with them. While a student at Northern Illinois University, Nimmer continued playing in Chicago clubs.

== Later life and career ==
Nimmer moved to New York in 2004. The following year, he joined the Jazz at Lincoln Center Orchestra. He also became pianist in a variety of bands led by trumpeter Wynton Marsalis. Nimmer's second recording as leader was Kelly Blue, a tribute to pianist Wynton Kelly.

== Playing style ==
A 2012 reviewer commented that "The emphasis on melody during the set is noteworthy, as Nimmer never let his considerable chops dominate a piece for the sake of show. Here is a pianist who respects the song". An earlier reviewer of Kelly Blue praised Nimmer's emulation of Kelly, and queried "whether Nimmer's technique and intimacy with history will eventually lead to the development of a distinctive personal voice".

== Discography ==
An asterisk (*) indicates that the year is that of release.

=== As leader/co-leader ===
Year recorded	Title	Label	Personnel/Notes
2005	Tea for Two	Venus	Trio, with David Wong (bass), Pete Van Nostrand (drums)
2006	Kelly Blue	Venus	Trio, with John Webber (bass), Jimmy Cobb (drums)
2007	Yours Is My Heart Alone	Venus	Trio, with Peter Washington (bass), Lewis Nash (drums)
2009	Modern Day Blues	Venus	Trio, with David Wong (bass), Pete Van Nostrand (drums)
2012	All the Things You Are	Venus	Trio, with David Wong (bass), Pete Van Nostrand (drums)
2012	All the Things You Are	Venus	As All the Things You Are, above; with Sayaka Tsuruta (vocals) on some tracks

=== As sideman ===
Year recorded	Leader	Title	Label
2007	Wynton Marsalis	From the Plantation to the Penitentiary	Blue Note
2007	Willie Nelson and Wynton Marsalis	Two Men with the Blues	Blue Note
2009*	Wynton Marsalis	He and She	Blue Note
2009*	Wynton Marsalis	Christmas Jazz Jam	Compass Productions
2009	Willie Nelson and Wynton Marsalis	Here We Go Again: Celebrating the Genius of Ray Charles	Blue Note
2009*	Joe Temperley	The Sinatra Songbook	Hep
2010*	Wynton Marsalis	From Billie Holiday to Edith Piaf: Live in Marciac	Future Aco / Rampart Street Music
2012	Sayaka Tsuruta	All the Things You Are	Venus
