= Wynton Marsalis (album) =

Studio album by Wynton Marsalis
- Released: January 8, 1982
- Recorded: 1981
- Studio: CBS; New York City (#1–2, 7); CBS/Sony; Shinanomachi, Roppongi, Tokyo (#3–6)
- Genre: Jazz, post-bop
- Length: 41:01
- Label: Columbia
- Producer: Herbie Hancock

Wynton Marsalis chronology
Wynton Marsalis (1982)	Think of One (1983)

Wynton Marsalis is the debut album by the jazz trumpeter Wynton Marsalis. It was released in 1982 by Columbia. It contains seven tracks, three composed by Marsalis. The album peaked at number 165 on the Billboard 200 and number nine on the Billboard Jazz Albums chart.

== Reception ==
Professional ratings
Review scores
Source	Rating
The Penguin Guide to Jazz Recordings	3.5/4 stars
The Rolling Stone Jazz Record Guide	4/5 stars

Writing in The Boston Phoenix, jazz critic Bob Blumenthal opined that "He doesn't do anything astounding, such as provide a new direction on the trumpet, but, hey, Wynton Marsalis is only 20, and he has already made his mark. His debut album, Wynton Marsalis (Columbia), caps a groundswell that has been building for two years, an uncommon burst of word-of-mouth excitement within the jazz community. No one will be surprised if Marsalis is quickly acclaimed among the top players on his instrument."

== Track listing ==
No.	Title	Writer(s)	Length
1.	"Father Time"	Wynton Marsalis	8:14
2.	"I'll Be There When the Time Is Right"	Herbie Hancock	2:33
3.	"RJ"	Ron Carter	3:50
4.	"Hesitation"	Wynton Marsalis	5:42
5.	"Sister Cheryl"	Tony Williams	7:24
6.	"Who Can I Turn To (When Nobody Needs Me)?"	Leslie Bricusse, Anthony Newley	4:39
7.	"Twilight"	Wynton Marsalis	8:39

== Personnel ==
- Wynton Marsalis – trumpet
- Branford Marsalis – tenor and soprano saxophones (tracks 1–5, 7)
- Herbie Hancock – piano (tracks 3, 5, 6)
- Kenny Kirkland – piano (tracks 1, 2, 7)
- Ron Carter – double bass (tracks 3–6)
- Charles Fambrough – double bass (track 7)
- Clarence Seay – double bass (tracks 1–2)
- Tony Williams – drums (tracks 3–6)
- Jeff "Tain" Watts – drums (tracks 1–2, 7)

== See also ==
- Wynton Marsalis discography
