= André Goudbeek =

- Born: 1946 (age 78–79); Zwolle, Netherlands
- Genres: Jazz
- Occupation(s): Musician, composer
- Instrument(s): Alto saxophone, bass clarinet, bandoneon

André Goudbeek (born 1946 in Zwolle) is a Dutch jazz and improvisation musician and composer from Mechelen (Belgium); he plays alto saxophone, bass clarinet and bandoneon, among other instruments.

== Biography ==
During his childhood, he received classical violin lessons. When he attended Gent University from 1965 to 1969, he pursued both violin as a member of the University Chamber Orchestra and saxophone as part of the University Jazz Sextet.

Goudbeek, along with Fred Van Hove, Paul Van Gysegem, Willy Roggeman and Cel Overberghe, founded WIM (the Working Group of Improvising Musicians) in 1973. He also had his own group (Full Moon Trio) and in the early 1980s was a member of The Brotherhood of Breath, the group of the late South African pianist Chris Mc Gregor.

He first played at Jazz Middelheim in 1981, with the saxophone quartet Tchicai-Goudbeek-Jeanneau-Maté.

From 1982 to 1994, he was a member of the Willem Breuker Kollektief.

In 1995 Goudbeek was commissioned by Filmhuis Mechelen to compose a soundtrack to Robert Flaherty's silent film Nanook of the North, a project that also saw the release of a CD of the same name. Together with the Nanook Quartet, he then undertook an extensive tour of more than eighty cultural centers and cinemas in Belgium, the Netherlands and northern France to accompany the film live.

Afterwards, he played live with such diverse jazz and improvisation musicians as Bart Maris, Peter Jacquemyn, Frank Vaganée, Han Bennink, Peter Brötzmann, Xu Fengxia, Joe Fonda and Ivo Vanderborght. With English vocalist Phil Minton, he released the improvisation CD As It Happened in 1998.

Goudbeek was also regularly active as a musician and/or composer for various theater productions, including those of Freek De Jonge, Loes Luca, Wim T. Schippers, Ischa Meijer and Paul Haenen.

In 2005 he made a CD with bandoneon improvisations which he named after the Mechelen hamlet where he stayed: the Zennegat.

== Discography ==
- 1995: Nanook of the North
- 1999: As It Happened
- 2004: Separate Realities
- 2005: Zennegat
