= Marsalis Standard Time, Vol. I =

Marsalis Standard Time, Vol. 1

Studio album by Wynton Marsalis
- Released: September 8, 1987
- Recorded: May 29–30, 1986 and September 24–25, 1986
- Studio: RCA Studio A, New York City
- Genre: Jazz
- Length: 62:45
- Label: Columbia
- Producer: Steven Epstein

Wynton Marsalis chronology
Carnaval (1987)	Marsalis Standard Time, Vol. 1 (1987)	Live at Blues Alley (1988)

Marsalis Standard Time, Vol. 1 is an album by jazz trumpeter Wynton Marsalis, released in 1987. It won the Grammy Award for Best Jazz Instrumental Performance, Group in 1988.

== Reception ==
Professional ratings
Review scores
Source	Rating
AllMusic	4/5 stars
Los Angeles Times	4/5 stars
The Penguin Guide to Jazz	3.5/4 stars

The album reached peak positions of number 153 on the Billboard 200 and number 2 on Billboard's Top Jazz Albums chart. Scott Yanow at AllMusic wrote: "Marsalis' tone is quite beautiful on the well-balanced set; even the ballads have their unpredictable moments." The Penguin Guide to Jazz gave the album three and a half stars and said, "[The album] was wonderfully judged, a programme of pieces that distanced him from the modernists without ever consigning him to the ranks of the Old Believers. Even after more than a decade, Marsalis Standard Time retains its burnish and class."

In Leonard Feather's four-star review, published in the Los Angeles Times shortly after the album's release, any reservations expressed are confined to the album's liner notes.

Marsalis twists the time around on "April in Paris," tries a little tenderness on "Goodbye," turns bassist Bob Hurst loose on "A Foggy Day" and presents his pianist Marcus Roberts, who senses the beauty of the melody on "Memories of You." Except for two Marsalis originals (a personalized blues and a delicate, muted "In the Afterglow") the trumpeter's mature approach to old pop songs is the focus. Incredibly, the verbose notes by Stanley Crouch manage to plow through some 2,000 words without once mentioning George Gershwin, Jerome Kern, Juan Tizol, Ray Noble, Eubie Blake or Hoagy Carmichael. These men merely composed the melodies without which there would have been no standard time.

The album was awarded a Grammy for Best Jazz Instrumental Performance, Group, in 1988.

== Track listing ==
No.	Title	Writer(s)	Length
1.	"Caravan"	Juan Tizol	8:19
2.	"April in Paris"	Vernon Duke, Yip Harburg	5:04
3.	"Cherokee"	Ray Noble	2:25
4.	"Goodbye"	Gordon Jenkins	8:17
5.	"New Orleans"	Hoagy Carmichael	5:42
6.	"Soon All Will Know"	Wynton Marsalis	3:38
7.	"Foggy Day"	George Gershwin, Ira Gershwin	7:36
8.	"The Song Is You"	Jerome Kern, Oscar Hammerstein II	5:13
9.	"Memories of You"	Andy Razaf, Eubie Blake	4:03
10.	"In the Afterglow"	Wynton Marsalis	3:35
11.	"Autumn Leaves"	Joseph Kosma, Jacques Prévert	6:27
12.	"Cherokee II"	Ray Noble	2:26

== Personnel ==
- Wynton Marsalis – trumpet
- Marcus Roberts – piano
- Robert Leslie Hurst III – double bass
- Jeff "Tain" Watts – drums

== See also ==
- Wynton Marsalis discography
