= Across the Imaginary Divide =

Album by Béla Fleck

Studio album by Béla Fleck and the Marcus Roberts Trio
- Released: June 5, 2012
- Genre: Contemporary jazz, post bop
- Length: 62:43
- Label: Rounder

Across the Imaginary Divide is a 2012 album by banjoist Béla Fleck and jazz pianist Marcus Roberts.

== Background ==
Fleck and Roberts first jammed together in 2009 at the Savannah Music Festival.

== Track listing ==
1. "Some Roads Lead Home" (Fleck) - 6:16
2. "I'm Gonna Tell You This Story One More Time" (Roberts) - 5:42
3. "Across The Imaginary Divide" (Fleck) - 4:42
4. "Let Me Show You What To Do" (Roberts) - 4:55
5. "Petunia" (Fleck/Roberts) - 5:01
6. "Topaika" (Roberts) - 4:33
7. "One Blue Truth" (Fleck) - 4:26
8. "Let's Go" (Roberts) - 5:58
9. "Kalimba" (Fleck) - 6:22
10. "The Sunshine And The Moonlight" (Roberts) - 5:37
11. "That Old Thing" (Fleck) - 5:07
12. "That Ragtime Feeling" (Roberts) - 4:08

== Personnel ==
- Béla Fleck – banjo
- Marcus Roberts – piano
- Jason Marsalis – drums
- Rodney Jordan – bass
