= Deep in the Shed =

Studio album by Marcus Roberts
- Released: 1990
- Recorded: August 9–10, 1989, December 10, 1989, December 15, 1989
- Studio: Mastersound Studios in Astoria, NY; Saenger Theatre in New Orleans, LA
- Genre: Jazz, stride piano
- Length: 42:16
- Label: Novus
- Producer: Delfeayo Marsalis

Marcus Roberts chronology
The Truth Is Spoken Here	Deep in the Shed	Alone with Three Giants

Professional ratings
Review scores
Source	Rating
Allmusic	3/5 stars

Deep in the Shed is the second studio album by jazz pianist Marcus Roberts, a protégé of trumpet player Wynton Marsalis. The album features Roberts playing chords on his left hand and "somewhat dark improvisations that burst into fireworks less often than you'd expect" with his right hand. Roberts is backed by a seven-piece band on most of this album, a lineup which included Marsalis performing under the alias E. Dankworth.

== Track listing ==
All songs written by Marcus Roberts.

1. "Nebuchadnezzar" - 9:40
2. "Spiritual Awakening" - 5:57
3. "The Governor" - 5:40
4. "Deep In The Shed" - 11:07
5. "Mysterious Interlude" - 5:42
6. "E. Dankworth" - 4:10

== Personnel ==
- Marcus Roberts – piano
- Scotty Barnhart – trumpet
- Wynton Marsalis – trumpet
- Wycliffe Gordon – trombone
- Wessell Anderson – alto saxophone
- Herbert Harris – tenor saxophone
- Todd Williams – tenor saxophone
- Chris Thomas – upright bass
- Reginald Veal – upright bass
- Maurice Carnes – drums
- Herlin Riley – drums
