= Live at Blues Alley (Wynton Marsalis album) =

Live album by Wynton Marsalis
- Released: June 21, 1988
- Recorded: December 19–20, 1986
- Venue: Blues Alley, Washington, D.C.
- Genre: Jazz
- Length: 107:28
- Label: Columbia
- Producer: Steven Epstein, George Butler

Wynton Marsalis chronology
Marsalis Standard Time, Vol. I (1987)	Live at Blues Alley (1988)	Baroque Music for Trumpets (1988)

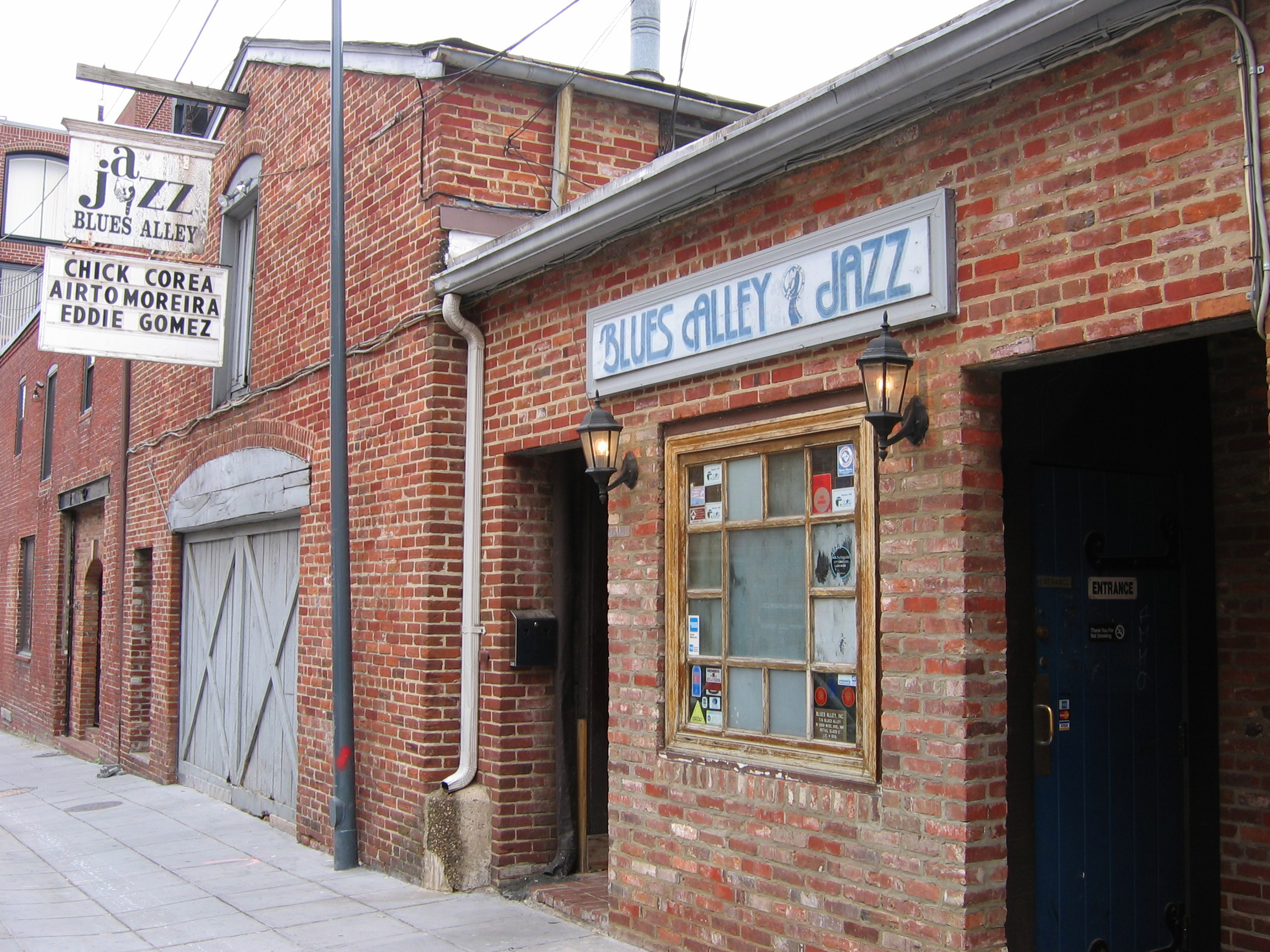
Blues Alley in Washington, D.C.

Live at Blues Alley is a double live album by the Wynton Marsalis Quartet, recorded at Blues Alley in December 1986 and released through Columbia Records in 1987. The quartet included trumpeter Wynton Marsalis, bassist Robert Hurst, pianist Marcus Roberts and drummer Jeff "Tain" Watts. The album was produced by Steven Epstein; George Butler served as executive producer.

In 1988, the album reached a peak position of number two on Billboard's Top Jazz Albums chart.

== Composition ==
The double live album Live at Blues Alley by the Wynton Marsalis Quartet was recorded December 19–20, 1986, at Blues Alley in Georgetown, Washington, D.C. Members of the quartet included trumpeter Wynton Marsalis, double bassist Robert Hurst, pianist Marcus Roberts and drummer Jeff "Tain" Watts. The album was produced by Steven Epstein; George Butler served as executive producer.

Marsalis's compositions on the album include "Knozz-Moe-King", "Skain's Domain", "Delfeayo's Dilemma", and "Much Later". Stanley Crouch wrote the album's liner notes.

== Critical reception ==
Professional ratings
Review scores
Source	Rating
AllMusic	4.5/5 stars
The Penguin Guide to Jazz Recordings	3.5/4 stars

AllMusic's Scott Yanow recommended the album.

== Track listing ==
All tracks are written by Wynton Marsalis except where noted.

Disc One
No.	Title	Writer(s)	Length
1.	"Knozz-Moe-King"		6:03
2.	"Just Friends"	John Klenner, Sam M. Lewis	8:22
3.	"Knozz-Moe-King (Interlude)"		3:52
4.	"Juan"	Marcus Roberts, Jeff "Tain" Watts	7:33
5.	"Cherokee"	Ray Noble	2:50
6.	"Delfeayo's Dilemma"		9:20
7.	"Chambers of Tain"	Kenny Kirkland	15:12
8.	"Juan (E Mustaad)"	Marcus Roberts, Jeff "Tain" Watts	2:56

Disc Two
No.	Title	Writer(s)	Length
9.	"Au Privave"	Charlie Parker	14:35
10.	"Knozz-Moe-King (Interlude)"		2:38
11.	"Do You Know What It Means to Miss New Orleans?"	Louis Alter, Eddie DeLange	11:30
12.	"Juan (Skip Mustaad)"	Marcus Roberts, Jeff "Tain" Watts	3:15
13.	"Autumn Leaves"	Joseph Kosma, Johnny Mercer, Jacques Prévert	9:41
14.	"Knozz-Moe-King (Interlude)"		3:48
15.	"Skain's Domain"		9:39
16.	"Much Later"		6:15

Adapted from AllMusic.

== Personnel ==
Musicians

- Wynton Marsalis – trumpet
- Marcus Roberts – piano
- Robert Hurst – double bass
- Jeff "Tain" Watts – drums

Production

- Steven Epstein – producer
- George Butler – executive producer
- Tim Geelan – engineer, mixing
- Phil Gitomer – assistant engineer
- J.B. Matteotti – assistant engineer
- Delfeayo Marsalis – mixing
- Stanley Crouch – liner notes

== Charts ==
In 1988, Live at Blues Alley reached number two on Billboard's Top Jazz Albums chart.

Chart (1988)	Peak position
US Top Jazz Albums (Billboard)	2

== See also ==
- List of 1930s jazz standards
- List of post-1950 jazz standards
