= From the Plantation to the Penitentiary =

Studio album by Wynton Marsalis
- Released: March 6, 2007
- Recorded: June 28 – 29, 2006
- Genre: Jazz
- Length: 58:26
- Label: Blue Note
- Producer: Delfeayo Marsalis

Wynton Marsalis chronology
Don't Be Afraid: The Music of Charles Mingus (2005)	From the Plantation to the Penitentiary (2007)	The War: A Ken Burns Film (2007)

From the Plantation to the Penitentiary is an album by jazz trumpeter Wynton Marsalis that was released in 2007. It reached No. 2 on Billboard's Top Jazz chart.

Professional ratings
Review scores
Source	Rating
AllMusic	link
BBC	(Favorable) March 13, 2007
ARTISTdirect	link
Audiophile Audition	link
Entertainment Weekly	A 03/30/07
The Penguin Guide to Jazz Recordings	3/4 stars

== Track listing ==
All tracks are written by Wynton Marsalis.

No.	Title	Length
1.	"From the Plantation to the Penitentiary"	11:48
2.	"Find Me"	9:34
3.	"Doin' (Y)our Thing"	8:37
4.	"Love and Broken Hearts"	7:40
5.	"Supercapitalism"	6:55
6.	"These Are Those Soulful Days"	8:04
7.	"Where Y'all At?"	5:48

== Personnel ==
- Wynton Marsalis – trumpet
- Walter Blanding – tenor and soprano saxophone
- Dan Nimmer – piano
- Carlos Henriquez – bass
- Ali Jackson – drums
- Jennifer Sanon – vocals

== Charts ==
- 2007 Billboard Top Jazz Albums # 2
