= Ron Westray =

American jazz trombonist, composer, and educator

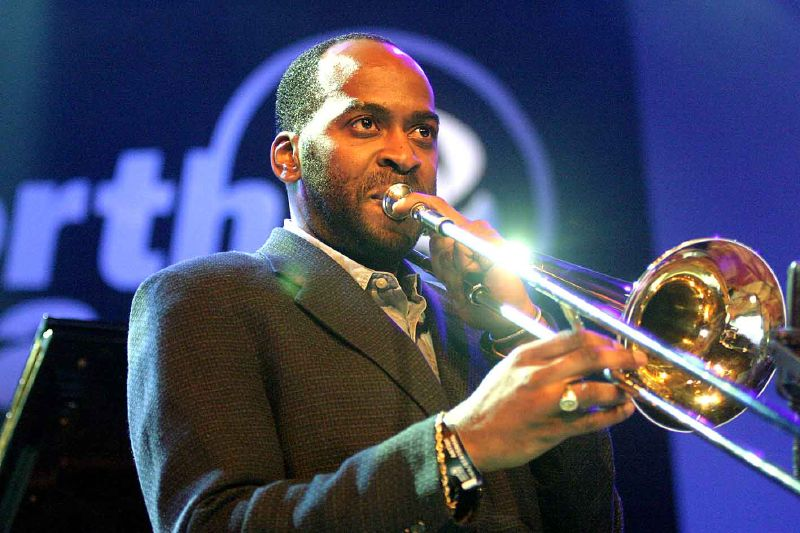

Background information
- Born: Ronald Kenneth Westray, Jr. 13 June 1970 (age 55); Columbia, South Carolina, U.S.
- Genres: Jazz
- Occupations: Musician, composer, educator
- Instrument: Trombone
- Labels: Blue Canoe, New Jazz Renaissance, Atlantic
- Member of: Mingus Big Band

Ronald Kenneth Westray Jr. (born June 13, 1970, in Columbia, South Carolina) is an American jazz trombonist, composer, and educator. He holds a B.A. from South Carolina State University and a Master of Arts degree from Eastern Illinois University. He has played with Marcus Roberts, the Lincoln Center Jazz Orchestra (since its inception in 1993), and has been a regular member of the Mingus Big Band. In 2005 he joined the faculty of the University of Texas at Austin. In 2009 he was appointed to the Oscar Peterson Chair in Jazz Performance at York University.

== Discography ==
- Westray Digs In (New Jazz Renaissance, 2002)
- Medical Cures for the Chromatic Commands of the Inner City (Blue Canoe, 2008)
- Ron Westray/Thomas Heflin Live from Austin (Blue Canoe, 2011)
- Jimi Jazz (Blue Canoe, 2014)
- Magisteria (Blue Canoe, 2015)

=== As sideman ===
With Wycliffe Gordon

- Bone Structure (Atlantic, 1996)
