= Gershwin: Piano Concerto in F =

Live album by Marcus Roberts
- Released: 2006
- Recorded: August 31 and September 1, 2005 at Naganoken Matsumoto Bunka Kaikan, Japan
- Genre: Post bop; Hard bop; Stride piano
- Length: 45:10
- Label: Philips Classics Records
- Producer: Dominic Fyfe

Marcus Roberts chronology
A Gershwin Night	Gershwin: Piano Concerto in F	New Orleans Meets Harlem, Volume 1

Gershwin: Piano Concerto in F is an album by Marcus Roberts, his trio and the Saito Kinen Orchestra under the direction of Seiji Ozawa, recorded live at the Saito Kinen Festival in 2005. It features Roberts' arrangement of Gershwin's concerto. This was Roberts' second time working with Ozawa on a live recording, A Gershwin Night being the first. The album saw a limited release in Japan.

== Track listing ==
Concerto in F (George Gershwin)

1. "Allegro" - 17:45
2. "Adagio -Andante con moto" - 15:45
3. "Allegro agitato" - 9:21

4. "Happy Birthday To You (Mildred Junius Welch)" - 2:19

== Personnel ==
- Marcus Roberts - piano
- Roland Guerin - bass
- Jason Marsalis - drums
- Seiji Ozawa - conductor
- Saito Kinen Orchestra

=== Additional personnel ===
- Dominic Fyfe - executive producer, recording producer
- Phil Siney - balance engineer, tape editor
- Ryu Kawashima, Mariko Miyashita, and Chiaki Shigemoto - recording engineers
- Tadaatsu Atarashi - production coordination
