= He and She (album) =

Studio album by Wynton Marsalis
- Released: March 24, 2009
- Recorded: August 24 – 25, 2007
- Genre: Jazz
- Length: 75:07
- Label: Blue Note

Wynton Marsalis chronology
Two Men with the Blues (2008)	He and She (2009)	Christmas Jazz Jam (2009)

He and She is an album by jazz trumpeter Wynton Marsalis, released in 2009. The album peaked at number 6 on the Top Jazz Albums chart of Billboard magazine.

== Music ==
A reviewer at DownBeat commented: "Using the vernacular of Langston Hughes, but writing in a formal, Olympian style inspired by Irish national poet William Butler Yeats, Marsalis alternates between words and music, reciting a stanza then dramatizing its theme with his quintet. At the end, he strings all the stanzas together, declaiming his long poem about the trials of love in a satisfying finale."

== Track listing ==
All tracks are written by Wynton Marsalis.

No.	Title	Length
1.	"Poem"	0:12
2.	"School Boy"	6:48
3.	"Poem"	0:27
4.	"The Sun and the Moon"	6:31
5.	"Poem"	0:10
6.	"Sassy"	5:17
7.	"Poem"	0:16
8.	"Fears"	3:31
9.	"Poem"	0:16
10.	"The Razor Rim"	12:05
11.	"Poem"	1:01
12.	"Zero"	2:17
13.	"Poem"	0:36
14.	"First Crush"	1:52
15.	"First Slow Dance"	4:37
16.	"First Kiss"	3:21
17.	"First Time"	4:47
18.	"Poem"	1:06
19.	"Girls!"	5:46
20.	"Poem"	0:59
21.	"A Train, a Banjo, and a Chicken Wing"	8:12
22.	"He and She"	5:00

== Personnel ==
- Wynton Marsalis – trumpet
- Walter Blanding – tenor saxophone, soprano saxophone, clarinet
- Dan Nimmer – piano
- Carlos Henriquez – bass
- Ali Jackson – drums
