= Jaune Toujours =

Jaune Toujours is a Belgian band originating from Brussels. Their style is best described as mestizo, a mix of salsa, Latin, ska, Balkan and punk.

== Origins ==
The band was founded in 1993 by singer and accordionist Piet Maris. During his first contacts with a Romani community in Slovakia in 1994 he learned the gipsy playing style and the typical Romani music repertoire. Jaune Toujours was inspired by this repertoire and completed their style with influences from salsa, Latin, reggae, ska, rock, punk and groove. They proclaim their world views with the energy of a rock band (without guitars), the improvisation of a jazz combo, the open-mindedness of a world music band and the vibe of a busker.

== History ==
After a few line-up changes in the early years in June 1997 the band was completed with drummer Théophane Raballand and trumpeter Bart Maris. A year later they recorded their first EP 'O'.

In June 1999 they decided to start their own artist collective. From then on they organized their own management and label as 'Choux de Bruxelles'. All projects within Choux de Bruxelles attach great importance to multiculturalism.

The first full-album 'Brusk' was recorded in 2000. In the same year they played the Global Activist Festival during the Euro summit in Brussels together with Ojos de Brujo and Babylon Circus.

In 2002 a second full-album titled 'Camping del Mundo' was released. After this release they played their first international concerts. In the following years they were support act for Manu Chao and Radio Bemba Sound System and represented Belgium at the EBU festival in Norway. The release of the third full-album 'Barricade' in 2004 got them new international concerts and live radio performances for BBC Three and Funkhaus Europe. The 2006 live album 'cluB' brought them international recognition. In the UK they played at WOMAD, the Cambridge Folk Festival and in the BBC Three studios. Furthermore they performed on Tanzfest Rudolstadt and Popdeurope Berlin in Germany and The Paradiso Amsterdam, Oerol Terschellingen and Fiesta Mundial Tilburg in the Netherlands. Overseas they toured the west coast of Canada with shows on Vancouver Island, Fort McLeod (cfr. Brokeback Mountain) and Calgary. In Belgium they performed at Couleur Café, Francofollies, Dranouter, Esperanzah!, Blue Note and Polé Polé. In April 2009 their fifth full-album 'KOLEKTIV' was released. In October of the same year they played a showcase for a selection of professionals on Womex in Copenhagen. In 2010 thousands of people across 12 different cities danced to the song 'Ici Bxl' to celebrate the Belgian EU presidency. The album 'Re:Plugged' was released in the same year. It features remixes of songs by Jaune Toujours and Mec Yek. In 2011 and 2012 Jaune Toujours cooperated with the Gangbé Brass Band of Benin. Together they released the EP 'Afrobelbeat' and toured throughout Belgium and Benin. In 2013 the studio album 'Routes' came out. This album was internationally well received with reviews in among others The Guardian and The Independent, Songlines (magazine),fRoots and Westzeit.

They have not been silent since the release of ROUTES (2013). In 2014 they worked with touareg musicians in Burkina Faso and they were invited for live sessions at BBC Radio. In 2015 they recorded the album 'SuperDiverCity' with their gypsy alter ego Mec Yek. In 2016 Jaune Toujours celebrated its (more or less) twentieth anniversary with the collector’s box and album Jaune Toujours 20sth. And in 2017, frontman Piet Maris released the album 'Entity' on the Choux de Bruxelles label with Qotob Trio, a new project with compositions from the Belgo-Syrian cellist Bassel Abou Fakher, to then start working full force directly after that on the new studio album 'Europeana' that was released in the autumn of 2018.

== Commitment ==
Jaune Toujours is characterized by the socially engaged lyrics of singer Piet Maris. Their hometown Brussels forms the breeding ground for the social themes that Jaune Toujours addresses. They prove their commitment with numerous collaborations. On the album Radio Transit they brought musicians together who were all undocumented migrants. The band 'Mec Yek' features two Roma singers so they can release their Balkan motown on the audience without having to give in to all the gipsy clichés. Since 2011 they came in close contact with the Gangbé Brass Band from Benin. Together they recorded the EP 'Afrobelbeat' and promoted it with concerts in Benin and Belgium.

== Current Formation ==
- Piet Maris - accordion & voice
- Théophane Raballand - drums & percussion
- Mathieu Verkaeren - double bass
- Mattias Laga - clarinets & soprano saxophone
- Bart Maris - trumpet
- Dirk Timmermans - trumpet
- Yves Fernandez-Solino - trumpet

== Discography ==
=== EP'S ===
- 1998: O
- 2012: Afrobelbeat (vs. Gangbé Brass Band)

=== Studio albums ===
- 2000: Brusk (Choux de Bruxelles)
- 2002: Camping del Mundo(Choux de Bruxelles)
- 2004: Barricade(Choux de bruxelles)
- 2009: Kolektiv (Choux de Bruxelles)
- 2013: Routes (Choux de Bruxelles)
- 2018: Europeana (Choux de Bruxelles)

=== Live albums ===
- 2006: cluB (Choux de Bruxelles)

=== Compilations ===
- 2006: Radio Transit
- 2010: Re:Plugged
- 2017: 20Sth (20 years anniversary collector's album)
