= Haydn, Hummel, L. Mozart: Trumpet Concertos =

Studio album by Wynton Marsalis
- Released: 1983
- Recorded: December 15–17, 1982
- Studio: EMI
- Genre: Classical
- Length: 39:47
- Label: Sony Classical
- Producer: Thomas Mowrey

Wynton Marsalis chronology
Think of One (1983)	Haydn, Hummel, L. Mozart: Trumpet Concertos (1983)	Baroque Music for Trumpet (1984)

Haydn, Hummel, L. Mozart: Trumpet Concertos is a studio album of trumpet concertos by Joseph Haydn, Leopold Mozart and Johann Nepomuk Hummel, performed by Wynton Marsalis with the National Philharmonic Orchestra under the direction of Raymond Leppard. The album won a Grammy award in 1984 for Best Instrumental Soloist Performance with orchestra.

== Reception ==
Professional ratings
Review scores
Source	Rating
AllMusic	4/5 stars
The Rolling Stone Album Guide	4/5 stars

AllMusic awarded the album 4 stars and its review by Richard S. Ginell states: "His first classical album having been released simultaneously with his second jazz album, Think of One, the 21-year-old Wynton Marsalis found himself in the position of being the most celebrated purveyor of both the classical and jazz repertoire since Benny Goodman". He also states that Marsalis "makes up his own marvelous cadenza in the first movement of the Haydn concerto, beginning with a pair of musical questions which he boldly proceeds to answer and continuing with other dialogues and wide leaps, all thoroughly within the classical style".

Ivan March reviewed the album on cassette in the December 1983 edition of Gramophone and describes Marsalis's trumpet playing as "very impressive indeed".

== Track listing ==
Joseph Haydn (1732-1809), Concerto for Trumpet and Orchestra in E-flat major

1. "Allegro" (Cadence: Wynton Marsalis) – 6:17
2. "Andante" – 3:14
3. "Allegro" – 4:26

Leopold Mozart (1719-1787), Concerto for Trumpet and Orchestra in D major

4. "Adagio" – 4:58
5. "Allegro moderato" (Embellishments: Wynton Marsalis) – 4:51

Johann Nepomuk Hummel (1778-1837), Concerto for Trumpet and Orchestra in E-flat major

6. "Allegro con spirito" – 9:41
7. "Andante" – 4:12
8. "Rondo. Allegro molto" – 3:29

== Personnel ==
- Wynton Marsalis - trumpet and piccolo trumpet
- National Philharmonic Orchestra
- Raymond Leppard - conductor

Production

- Thomas Mowrey - producer
- Michael Gray - engineer
- Stuart Eltham - engineer

== Awards ==
Year	Winner	Category
Grammy Awards of 1984	Haydn, Hummel, L. Mozart: Trumpet Concertos	Grammy Award for Best Instrumental Soloist Performance with orchestra
