= Pierre Vervloesem =

Pierre Vervloesem is a Belgian avant-garde guitar player and producer, and has been described as Belgium's Frank Zappa.

== Career ==
After playing in a handful of experimental rock bands in the early 1990s, Vervloesem joined avant-garde band X-Legged Sally. During that collaboration, he appeared on the band's albums:

Slow-Up (1991)

,Immer das Selbe Gelogen (1991)

Killed by Charity (1994)

Eggs and Ashes (1995)

The Land of the Giant Dwarfs1996)

Fired (1996)

Bereft of a Blissful Union (1997)

Since then, he has been a musical partner of Peter Vermeersch in many musical expeditions, both as a performer and as a producer, for example in A Group and the theatre production Weg (by Josse De Pauw). Together Vervloesem and Vermeersch produced the first LP by Antwerp rock group dEUS.

Vervloesem has also released several solo LPs

== Playing style ==
Vervloesem's guitar playing style has been associated with that of: Nick Didkovsky, Fred Frith, Zappa, Nels Cline, Joe Satriani, and Steve Vai.

== Discography ==
- Home Made (1994)
- Fiasco (1996)
- Chef d'Oeuvre (1999)
- Zala Zala (2000), with John Litton Baraï
- ...plays John Barry (2002)
- Grosso Modo (2002)
- Rude (2005)
- Not Even Close (2008)
- Unchained Melodies (2009), by Kings of Belgium
- Sketches of Pain (2010), by Caca
- John Koenig (2010)
- Grotesque (2010), by Codswallop
- Très fort (2011), by Kings of Belgium
- On dirait du singe (2012), by Ray Pinson
- Silence Science (2013)
- A Carbon Copy of Secrets (2022), a cover of Pink Floyd's A Saucerful of Secrets (1968)
- Wing-Chester (2018), with teun Verbruggen
- Undeletable (2018) by Simple
- Undeletable demo album (2018)
- Live at Pelzer Jazz House (2018), with teun Verbruggen and Adrien Lambinet
- Maité, het meisje en de vogel (2018) by Orchestra Exotica
- Plays Martin Denny (2018) by Orchestra Exotica
- Pot-pourri, Vol 1 (unreleased tracks) (2018)
- Pot-pourri, Vol 2 (unreleased tracks) (2018)
- Pot-pourri, Vol 3 (unreleased tracks) (2018)
- The Art Of Going Nowhere, Part 1&2 (2018)
- The Art Of Going Nowhere, Part 3 (2018)
- The Art Of Going Nowhere, Part 4 (2018)
- Invisible Quality (2018) with Alinovsky
- The Art Of Going Nowhere 1 extended (2018)
- The Art Of Going Nowhere 2 extended (2018)
- The Art Of Going Nowhere 3 extended (2018)
- The Art Of Going Nowhere 4 extended (2018)
- Artiste Belge (2019)
- Artiste International (2019) with Morgan Agren
- Quality Streets (2019) by Kings of Belgium
- Undeletable remixed (2019) by Simple
- Wonderful Viruses (2019)
- Sketches of Pain remixed (2020) by Caca
- John Koenig remixed (2020)
- Stardom (2020)
- Africa (2020)
- 1983 (2020)
- Ponorogo (2020)
- Influenza (2020)
- Haines (2020)
- Saint-Guy (2020)
- Lou Rick’s Island (2020)
- Folklorik (2021)
- Tâla Shit (2021)
- Ruder (2021)
- Don’t (2021)
- Electronicaca (2021)
- 2020 (2021)
- Dead (2021)
- The Weight of a threatening Blue Sky (2021)
- Pierre Vervloesem’s Flambant Neuf (2021) with bruno Vansina, Teun Verbruggen, Thomas Mayade, Falk Schrauwen
- Basses of May (2021)
- Young Talents (2021) by Pierre Vervloesem/Teun Verbruggen
- Minimal Tropical (2021)
- 30 Years of Succes (2022)
- Masterpieces of irish Folklore, Vol. 12 (2022) by Pierre Vervloesem/Eric Thielemans
- Not Even Close- Remastered and revised 2021 (2022)
- Tamtams (2022) by Pierre Vervloesem/Marc Van Eyck
- A Carbon Copy of Secrets (2022), a cover of Pink Floyd's A Saucerful of Secrets (1968)
- Zgouing (2022)
- Dark Matter 1- Dark Matter 2 (2022)
- Dark Matter 3- Dark Matter 4 (2022)
- Artsy-Fartsy (2022)
- Oh ! (2022)
- New Wave (2023)
- Underwater Adventures (2023)
- Expected Noises (2023) a cover of the album Unexpected Noises by Brian Brain
- Chicxulub (2023) by Pierre Vervloesem/Teun Verbruggen
- Let Fans Pay More If They Want (2023)
- Let Fans Pay Some More If They Want (2023)
- Dark Matter 5-Dark Matter 6 (2023)
- Hit Me With Your Stochastic (2023) by Pierre Vervloesem/Teun Verbruggen
- Spacequake (2023)
- Graviton (2024)
- Saucers (2024)
- Non-essential (2024)
- Sorry Louise couldn't come (2024) by Vansina / Verbruggen / Vervloesem
- Buch Der Dinge (2024) by Vervloesem/Kowalski/Verbruggen
- Lotta Boom Boom (2024)
- Cue Music For Unsolicited Movie (2024)
- Easy Solos (2024)
- Palm Bleach (2024)
