= Marcus Roberts =

American jazz pianist, composer, and bandleader

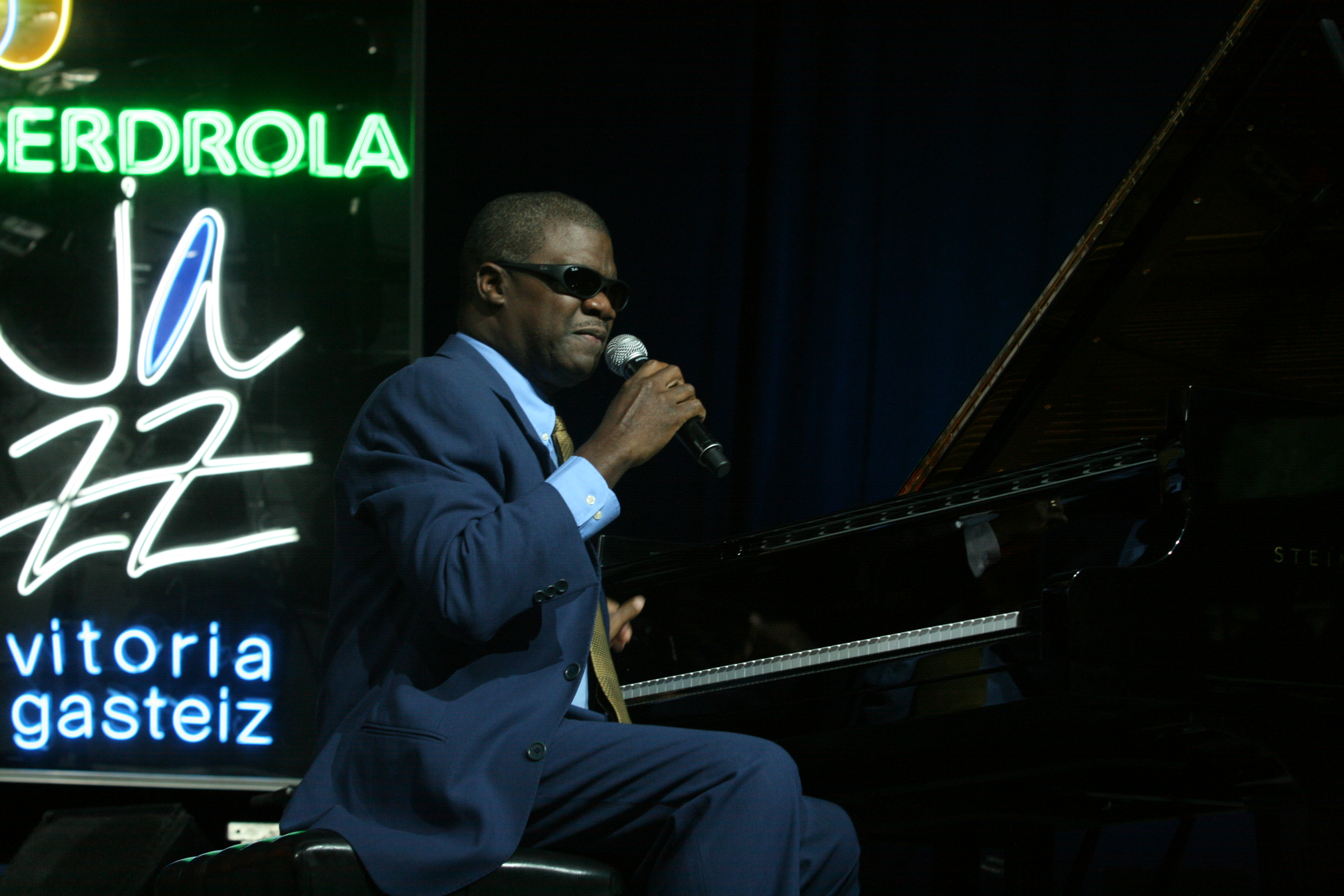
- Roberts at the Festival de Jazz de Vitoria, 2010

Background information
- Born: Marthaniel Roberts; August 7, 1963 (age 62); Jacksonville, Florida, U.S.
- Genres: Jazz, swing, classical
- Occupations: Musician, composer, arranger
- Instrument: Piano
- Years active: 1980s–present
- Labels: Novus, Columbia, J-Master
- Website: www.marcusroberts.com

Marthaniel "Marcus" Roberts (born August 7, 1963) is an American jazz pianist, composer, arranger, bandleader, and teacher.

== Early life ==
Roberts was born in Jacksonville, Florida, United States. His mother was a gospel singer who had gone blind as a teenager, and his father was a longshoreman. Blind since age five due to glaucoma and cataracts, Roberts started learning the piano at age five by picking out notes on the instrument at his church until his parents bought a piano when he was eight. He attended the Florida School for the Deaf and the Blind in St. Augustine, Florida, the alma mater of Ray Charles. Roberts began teaching himself piano at an early age, having his first lesson at age 12, and then studying with Leonidas Lipovetsky while attending Florida State University.

== Career ==
In the 1980s, Roberts replaced pianist Kenny Kirkland in Wynton Marsalis's band. Like Marsalis's, his music is rooted in the traditional jazz of the past. His style has been influenced more by Jelly Roll Morton and Fats Waller than McCoy Tyner and Bill Evans, with an emphasis on ragtime and stride piano rather than bebop. His album New Orleans Meets Harlem, Vol. 1 (2009) covers music by Scott Joplin, Duke Ellington, Morton, and Waller.

The Atlanta Symphony Orchestra and the Savannah Music Festival commissioned Roberts's first piano concerto, Spirit of the Blues: Piano Concerto in C Minor. He has performed as a soloist in symphony orchestras with Marin Alsop (1992) and Seiji Ozawa. He returned to Japan in September 2014 to share the stage with Ozawa and the Saito Kinen Festival Orchestra.

In 2012, Roberts founded the band The Modern Jazz Generation, which released its first album in October 2014. It has 12 musicians ranging in age from early 20s to 50s. He served as associate artistic director for the Savannah Music Festival as well as the director of the annual Swing Central high school band competition. He is on the faculty at Florida State University.

In 2014, Roberts was profiled on the television show 60 Minutes.

Roberts received an honorary doctorate from Brigham Young University (BYU) for the 2021 commencement on April 22. BYU conferred upon Roberts the degree of Doctor of Civic Engagement Through Music, honoris causa, for his outstanding life and contributions to society and to the world. In his address, Roberts said: "We need to take time to really see each person, especially those who don't look or act like us, because if we hold onto and build upon that thread that binds us together, our ties will become stronger, we'll develop more of a sense of communion and trust with each other". As part of his address, Roberts performed a special piano musical arrangement of the gospel hymn "Just a Closer Walk with Thee". The degree conferral and address were video-recorded the previous weekend in Boston before being shown at BYU's commencement.

Bard College appointed Roberts distinguished visiting professor of music for the 2020–21 academic year.

== Discography ==
=== As leader/co-leader ===
- The Truth Is Spoken Here (Novus, 1989) – recorded in 1988
- Deep in the Shed (Novus/Sony, 1990) – recorded in 1989
- Alone with Three Giants (Novus, 1991)
- Prayer for Peace (Novus, 1991)
- As Serenity Approaches (Novus, 1991)
- If I Could Be with You (Novus, 1993)
- Gershwin for Lovers (Columbia, 1994)
- Portraits in Blue (Columbia/Sony, 1995)
- Time and Circumstance (Columbia/Sony, 1996)
- Blues for the New Millennium (Columbia, 1997)
- The Joy of Joplin (Sony, 1998)
- In Honor of Duke (Columbia, 1999)
- Cole after Midnight (Columbia/Sony, 2001)
- A Gershwin Night with Seiji Ozawa and Berlin Philharmonic (EuroArts Music International, 2004)[DVD-Video] – recorded in 2003
- Gershwin: Piano Concerto in F (Philips Classics, 2006)
- New Orleans Meets Harlem, Volume 1 (J-Master, 2009)
- Celebrating Christmas (J-Master, 2011)
- Deep in the Shed: A Blues Suite (J-Master, 2012)
- From Rags to Rhythm (J-Master, 2013)
- Together Again: In the Studio with Wynton Marsalis (J-Master, 2013)
- Together Again: Live in Concert with Wynton Marsalis (J-Master, 2013)
- Romance, Swing, and the Blues (J-Master, 2014)
- The Race for the White House (EP) (2016)
- Trio Crescent: Celebrating Coltrane (J-Master, 2017)

=== As sideman ===
With Wynton Marsalis

- J Mood (1986) – recorded in 1985
- Marsalis Standard Time, Vol. I (1987) – recorded in 1986
- Live at Blues Alley (1988)
- The Majesty of the Blues (1989) – live recorded in 1986
- Crescent City Christmas Card (1989)
- Standard Time, Vol. 2: Intimacy Calling (1990)
- Thick in the South: Soul Gestures in Southern Blue, Vol. 1 (1991)
- Uptown Ruler: Soul Gestures in Southern Blue, Vol. 2 (1991)
- Levee Low Moan: Soul Gestures in Southern Blue, Vol. 3 (1991)
- Blue Interlude (1992)
- Citi Movement (1993)
- Jazz at Lincoln Center Presents: The Fire of the Fundamentals (1994) – in Lincoln Center Jazz Orchestra
- Jazz at Lincoln Center: They Came to Swing (1994) – in Lincoln Center Jazz Orchestra, recorded 1992–94.
- Live at the Village Vanguard (1999)
- The Marciac Suite (2000)
- Swinging into the 21st (2011)
- The Music of America (2021)

With others

- Mark Whitfield, The Marksman (1990)
- Wycliffe Gordon/Ron Westray, Bone Structure (1996)
- Marcus Printup, Unveiled (1996)
- Béla Fleck, Across the Imaginary Divide (2012)
- Jason Marsalis, Heirs of the Crescent City (2016)
- Chick Corea, The Musician (Concord Jazz, 2017)[3CD]
