= J Mood =

Studio album by Wynton Marsalis
- Released: October 14, 1986
- Recorded: December 17–20, 1985
- Studio: RCA, New York City
- Genre: Jazz
- Length: 42:35
- Label: Columbia
- Producer: George Butler, Steven Epstein

Wynton Marsalis chronology
Tomasi, Jolivet: Trumpet Concertos (1986)	J Mood (1986)	Carnaval (1987)

Professional ratings
Review scores
Source	Rating
AllMusic	4/5 stars
The Penguin Guide to Jazz Recordings	4/4 stars
The Village Voice	B+

J Mood is an album by Wynton Marsalis that won the Grammy Award for Best Instrumental Jazz Performance, Individual or Group in 1987.

== Critical reception ==
In a review for Playboy, Robert Christgau said that Marsalis is "chief among the younger players who eschew expressionistic excess in favor of technical command and respect for history", and that J Mood "isn't as staid as you might think, holding subtle pleasures to spare for those with time to spare". The Penguin Guide to Jazz Recordings lists the album as part of its suggested “core collection” of essential recordings.

== Track listing ==
All tracks are written by Wynton Marsalis except where noted.

No.	Title	Writer(s)	Length
1.	"J Mood"		8:35
2.	"Presence That Lament Brings"	Marcus Roberts	5:53
3.	"Insane Asylum"	Donald Brown	6:34
4.	"Skain's Domain"		6:30
5.	"Melodique"		4:32
6.	"After"	Ellis Marsalis Jr.	6:10
7.	"Much Later"		4:36

== Personnel ==
- Wynton Marsalis – trumpet
- Marcus Roberts – piano
- Robert Hurst III – bass
- Jeff "Tain" Watts – drums
