= Think of One =

Studio album by Wynton Marsalis
- Released: October 11, 1983
- Studio: Mediasound, New York City
- Genre: Jazz
- Length: 44:38
- Label: Columbia
- Producer: George Butler

Wynton Marsalis chronology
Wynton Marsalis (1982)	Think of One (1983)	Haydn, Hummel, L. Mozart: Trumpet Concertos (1983)

Professional ratings
Review scores
Source	Rating
The Penguin Guide to Jazz Recordings	3/4 stars
The Rolling Stone Jazz Record Guide	4/5 stars

Think of One is an album by jazz trumpeter Wynton Marsalis, released in 1983. It won the Grammy Award for Best Jazz Instrumental Performance, Soloist.

The album peaked at number 102 on the Billboard 200 and number one on the Billboard Top Jazz Albums chart. It was ranked at number 8 among "Albums of the Year" for 1983 by NME. The album takes its name from the Thelonious Monk composition "Think of One", which is performed on the album.

== Track listing ==
No.	Title	Writer(s)	Length
1.	"Knozz-Moe-King"	Wynton Marsalis	6:00
2.	"Fuchsia"	Kenny Kirkland	6:29
3.	"My Ideal"	Newell Chase, Leo Robin, Richard A. Whiting	6:19
4.	"What Is Happening Here (Now)?"	Ray Drummond	4:06
5.	"Think of One"	Thelonious Monk	5:30
6.	"The Bell Ringer"	Wynton Marsalis	9:05
7.	"Later"	Wynton Marsalis	4:09
8.	"Melancholia"	Duke Ellington	2:49

== Personnel ==
- Wynton Marsalis – trumpet, arranger, producer
- Branford Marsalis – soprano and tenor saxophones
- Kenny Kirkland – piano
- Phil Bowler – bass
- Ray Drummond – bass
- Jeff "Tain" Watts – drums

Technical

- George Butler – executive producer
- Tim Geelan – engineer
- Harry Spiridakis – assistant engineer
- Marc Cobrin – assistant engineer
- Stanley Crouch – liner notes
