= Peter Vermeersch =

Clarinet player, composer, music producer

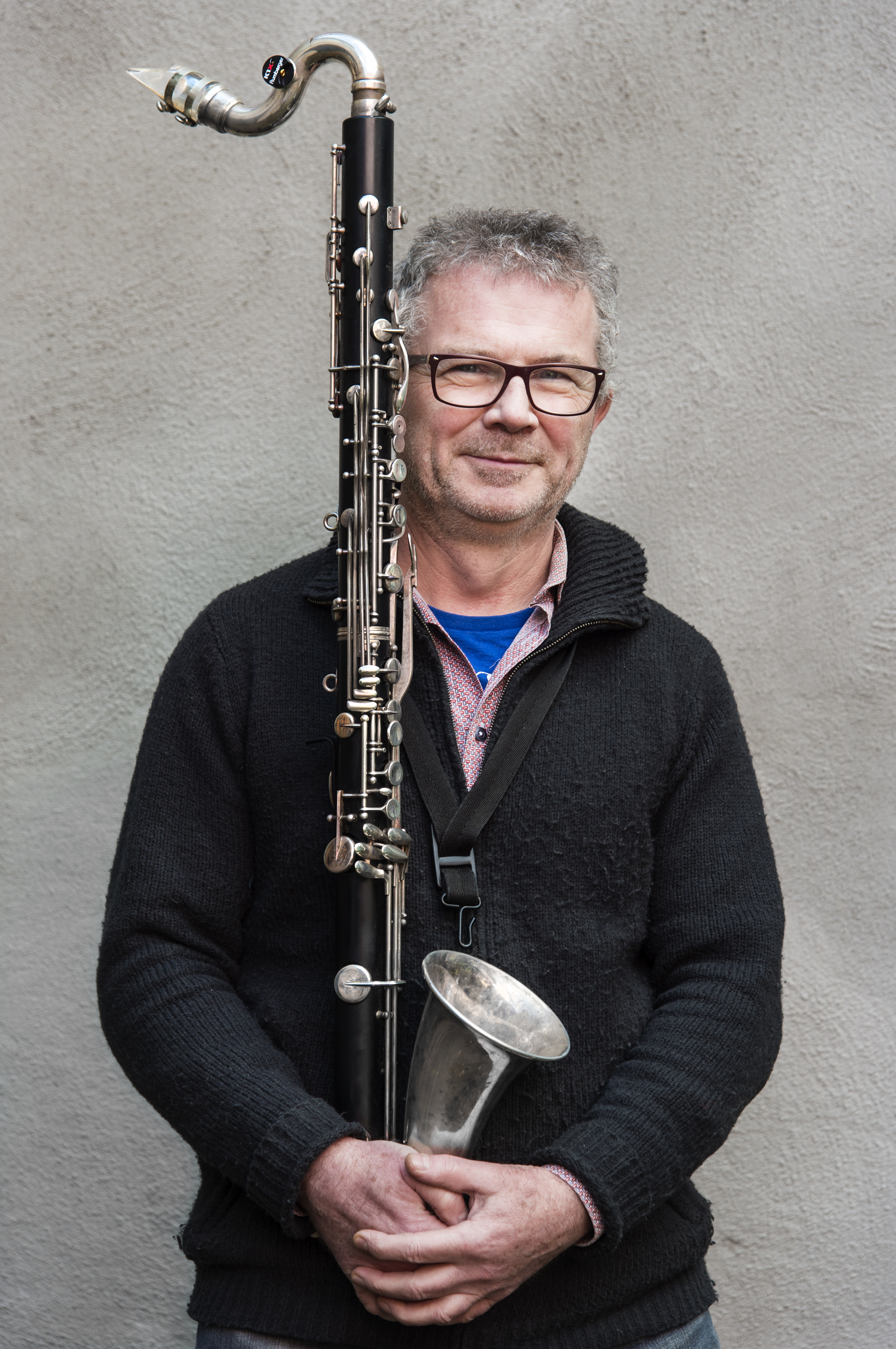
Peter Vermeersch (March 2019).

Peter Vermeersch (born 1959 in Waregem) is a Belgian composer, clarinet player and producer.

He is a main character in several Belgian bands such as X-Legged Sally, A Group and the Flat Earth Society. His compositions, balancing between classical, jazz and pop music, are often commissioned for or used by modern dance companies.

As a producer he helped to form the first album of Belgium's most prominent indie band dEUS. As such, he is one of the godfathers of the Belgian music scene.

== Early career ==
Vermeersch's formal training include architecture and urbanization, and a modern art course. He soon got involved with music and started composing. In the eighties and early nineties, Vermeersch was part of the post-modern classical ensembles Union and Maximalist! and composed and performed music for dance productions by Rosas and Ultima Vez. He was also a member of the Simpletones and Kamagurka en the Vlaamse Primitieven. Among his first official compositions is part of the music for the dance production Rosas danst Rosas (1983).

== Bands ==
Because Vermeersch soon grew tired of the constraints imposed by sheet music, he started his own ensemble X-Legged Sally. In a way, XLS was the last Belgian prog-rock band. In another way, it was the first band of the new Belgian scene. Many X-Legged Sally compositions were originally soundtracks to dance performances. X-Legged Sally split up in 1997.

Out of the ashes of X-Legged Sally sprung A Group, who have released two CDs and are currently inactive. A Group mixes the creativity of X-Legged Sally with pure and simple pop tunes.

Currently Peter Vermeersch's main project is the Flat Earth Society, a big band, led by him, that mixes the rich Belgian brass band (HaFaBra) tradition with characteristic topsy-turvy creativity.

== Compositions ==
As a composer, Peter Vermeersch has his own place among the long list of contemporary Belgian composers, although, due to his lack of formal training and his involvement with pop music, he doesn't necessarily fit in with the likes of Wim Henderickx, Luc Brewaeys or Boudewijn Buckinx.

From his early career, Peter Vermeersch has composed music for modern dance productions of renowned Belgian companies such as Rosas and Ultima Vez. Other pieces were composed to accompany theatre plays, such as Josse De Pauw's Weg.

Some of the songs of X-Legged Sally have been published as sheet music and performed by contemporary classical ensembles. Apart from these, various ensembles have commissioned compositions, such as a string quartet for Walpurgis and the tone poem 's Nachts brede opklaringen for the Spiegel Strijkkwartet.

Major compositions include the oratoria or mini-operas Music Hall on poems by Paul van Ostaijen for Prima la Musica, The Soluble Fish and Charms on poems by Daniil Kharms, both for Walpurgis. The grand big-band opera Heliogabal was written for the Ruhr Triennale and performed by the Flat Earth Society.

In 2004 he was appointed 'town composer' of Ghent, a position he used to compose a song for the carillon and for the Gentse Feesten (performed by Kamagurka).

== Discography ==
This discography does not include the recordings by the bands Peter Vermeersch has played in or has written music for.

- Rosas danst Rosas (1983)
- Immer das Selbe Gelogen (1991)
- Music Hall (1996)
- De Oplosbare Vis (1996)
- Weg (1999)
- Charms (2000)

== Works ==
=== Music for theatre and dance ===
- Echafaudages (Radeis, with Union, 1981)
- Rosas danst rosas (with Thierry De Mey, Anne-Theresa Dekeersmaecker & Rosas, 1983)
- Usurpation (Josse De Pauw, 1985)
- What the body does not remember (with Thierry De Mey, Wim Vandekeybus & Ultima Vez, 1987)
- Ward Comblez, he do the life in three voices (Josse De Pauw, 1989)
- Le poids de la main - live music (with Thierry De Mey, Wim Vandekeybus & Ultima Vez, 1990)
- Immer dasselbe gelogen (Wim Vandekeybus & Ultima Vez, 1991)
- Her body doesn't fit her soul (Wim Vandekeybus & Ultima Vez, 1993)
- Mountains made of barking (Wim Vandekeybus & Ultima Vez, 1994)
- De oplosbare vis/The Soluble Fish (Walpurgis ensemble, 1996)
- Music-Hall, song cycle on poems by Paul Van Ostaijen (chamber orchestra, soprano and baritone, 1996)
- Bereft of a blissful union - live music (Wim Vandekeybus & Ultima Vez, 1996)
- Oorsmeersessions (for Flat Earth Society and circus artists, 1997)
- Charms - Song-cycle on poems by Daniil Charms (accordion, percussion, clarinet, soprano) (November 1997)
- Trage Kogels/Slow Bullets (Nieuwpoorttheater, theater Antigone & theater Zuidpool, 2000)
- Weg (Josse De Pauw, 1999)
- Larf (Josse De Pauw, 2000)
- Heliogabal (big-band opera, 2003)
- Mé Gusta (Laika Antwerpen 2008)

=== Music for movies ===
- De stille oceaan/The Pacific Ocean (Digna Sinke, 1984)
- De tocht/The Journey (live music on short film by Hendrickx-Dehollander)
- The way of the weed ("Digital Dancefilm" by Misotten-Quirijnen-Lambrechts)
- Vinaya (De Pauw - Van Kraaij, 1992)
- Brussels Midnight (Van den Berghe, 1998)
- Brasschaet (film by Jules Van Volxem, 1932, composition 1998)
- Undercover Kitty (Vincent Bal, 2001)
- De Oesterprinses/The Oyster Princess (film by Ernst Lubitsch, 191; composition, 2005)

=== Music for music ===
- X pieces for small orchestra (chamber orchestra)
- 3 or 2 portraits of a drowning person (string quartet)
- Doppler quintet (string quartet & clarinet, 1992)
- Rain brings back the dust
- Wegener quartet (string trio & clarinet)
- Für Rumpelstilzchen (ensemble for Champ d'Action, 1993)
- The purple cucumber (1995)
- We beginnen vanaf maat 158 (8 tuba's & piccolo)
- Slow surfer on a turd stream (Instant Composing piece for 17 musicians, for November music)
- Stukken (string quartet, for De Singel/Arditi String Quartet)
- November Music International (March, the Harelbeke Brass Band)
- 's Nachts Brede Opklaringen (String quartet, Spiegel Strijkkwartet)
