= Wim Vandekeybus =

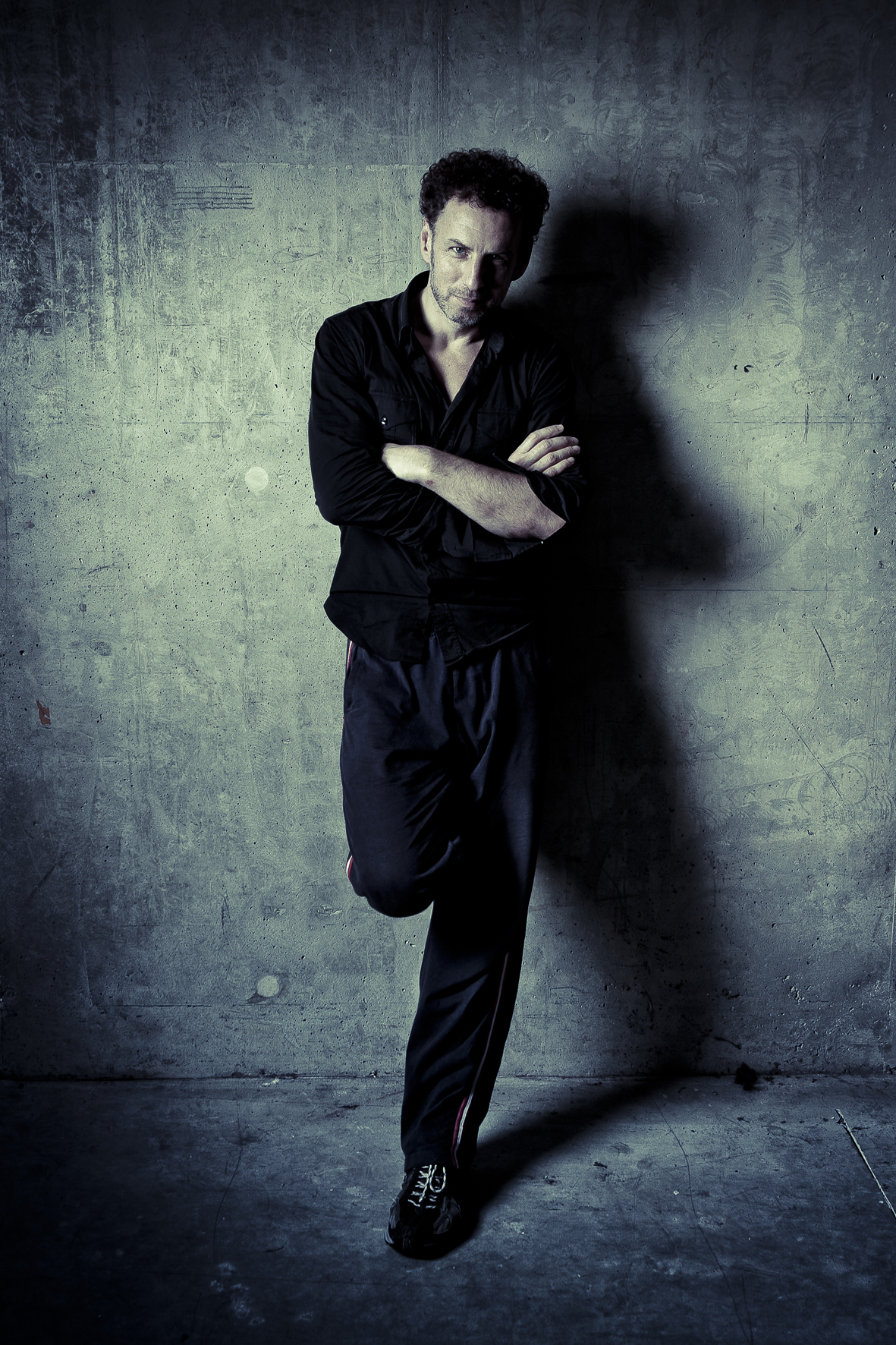
Wim Vandekeybus (Photo Danny Willems)

Wim Vandekeybus (Herenthout, 30 June 1963) is a Belgian choreographer, director and photographer. His company Ultima Vez is located in Molenbeek-Saint-Jean (Brussels). Together with Jan Fabre, Alain Platel and Anne Teresa De Keersmaeker, Wim Vandekeybus has been responsible for the Flemish Wave in contemporary dance in the 1980s. He made over thirty international dance and theater productions and almost as many movies and video works.

== Breakthrough ==
After graduating high school, he briefly studied Psychology in KU Leuven in Leuven, Belgium. But later on, however, he decided to pursue a different path. After a workshop with Paul Peyskens he came in contact with theater. He followed through with various dance workshops (including tango and contemporary dance) and focused on film and photography.

After auditioning for Jan Fabre’s The Power of Theatrical Madness in 1985, Wim Vandekeybus spent two years travelling the world as one of the play’s two naked kings. In 1986 he withdrew to Madrid for several months with a group of novice dancers to work on his first show and to launch his company Ultima Vez.

His first show What the Body Does Not Remember premiered in June 1987 at the Toneelschuur in Haarlem (the Netherlands). The music driving the dancers was composed by Thierry De Mey and Peter Vermeersch. The performance won a Bessie Award in 1988 in New York.

A residency in 1989 at the Centre National de Danse Contemporaine d'Angers resulted in Les porteuses de mauvaises nouvelles, which earned Vandekeybus a second Bessie Award.

== Vandekeybus' signature ==
Although Vandekeybus' signature resides first and foremost in the physical material, Ultima Vez’ early shows already reveal the rudimentary outlines of a narrative, for example in the opposition between men and women. How people react in unfamiliar situations or marginal positions has always fascinated Vandekeybus. He has often sought to collaborate with other artists but also to work with non-artists as well as with dancers and performers of all ages and from a range of backgrounds.

Vandekeybus’ search for novelty and innovation is a constant in his work, but throughout his very different productions he has always remained true to the idiom of movement. Key elements of his oeuvre are tension and conflict, the body/mind dichotomy, risks and impulses as well as physicality, passion, intuition and instinct. However, each element is tackled differently in his shows.

== Performances ==
1987 What the Body Does Not Remember; 1989 Les porteuses de mauvaises nouvelles; 1990 The Weight of a Hand; 1991 Immer das Selbe gelogen; 1993 Her Body Doesn't Fit Her Soul; 1994 Mountains Made of Barking; 1995 Alle Grössen decken sich zu; 1996 Bereft of a Blissful Union; 1996 Exhaustion from Dreamt love; 1997 7 for a Secret never to be told	1998 Body, body on the wall…; 1998 The Day of Heaven and Hell; 1999 In Spite of Wishing and Wanting; 2000 Inasmuch as Life is borrowed…; 2001 Scratching the Inner Fields; 2002 ’s NACHTs; 2002 Bericht aan de Bevolking; 2002 it; 2002 Blush; 2003 Sonic Boom	2004 Viva!; 2004 Rent a kid, no bullshit!; 2005 Puur; 2006 Bêt noir; 2007 Spiegel; 2007 Nachtschade; 2007 MENSKE; 2008 Lichtnacht; 2009 Black Biist; 2009 nieuwZwart	2010 Monkey Sandwich; 2011 Radical Wrong; 2011 IT 3.0; 2001 Oedipus / bêt noir; 2012 FEAR NOT; 2012 booty Looting; 2013 Spiritual Unity; 2014 Talk to the Demon; 2015 Speak low if you speak love …; 2017 Mockumentary of a Contemporary Saviour; 2018 Go Figure Out Yourself; 2018 TrapTown	2019 Die Bakchen; 2019 TRACES

== Filmography ==
1990 Roseland; 1992 La Mentira; 1993 Elba and Federico; 1994 Mountains Made of Barking	1996 Bereft of a Blissful Union; 1996 Dust; 1997 Body, Body on the wall…; 1999 The Last Words	2000 Inasmuch; 2001 Silver; 2002 In Spite of Wishing and Wanting; 2005 Blush	2007 Here After; 2011 Monkey Sandwich; 2015 Galloping Mind

== Awards ==
- In 1988 Wim Vandekeybus receives a Bessie Award for What the Body Does Not Remember
- In 1990 Wim Vandekeybus receives a Bessie Award for Les Porteuses de mauvaises nouvelles
- In 2007 Wim Vandekeybus receives the Choreography Media Honor of the Directors Guild of America in Los Angeles
- Keizer Karel prize (2012)
- Evens Arts Prize (2013)
