= Wynton Marsalis =

American jazz trumpeter (born 1961)

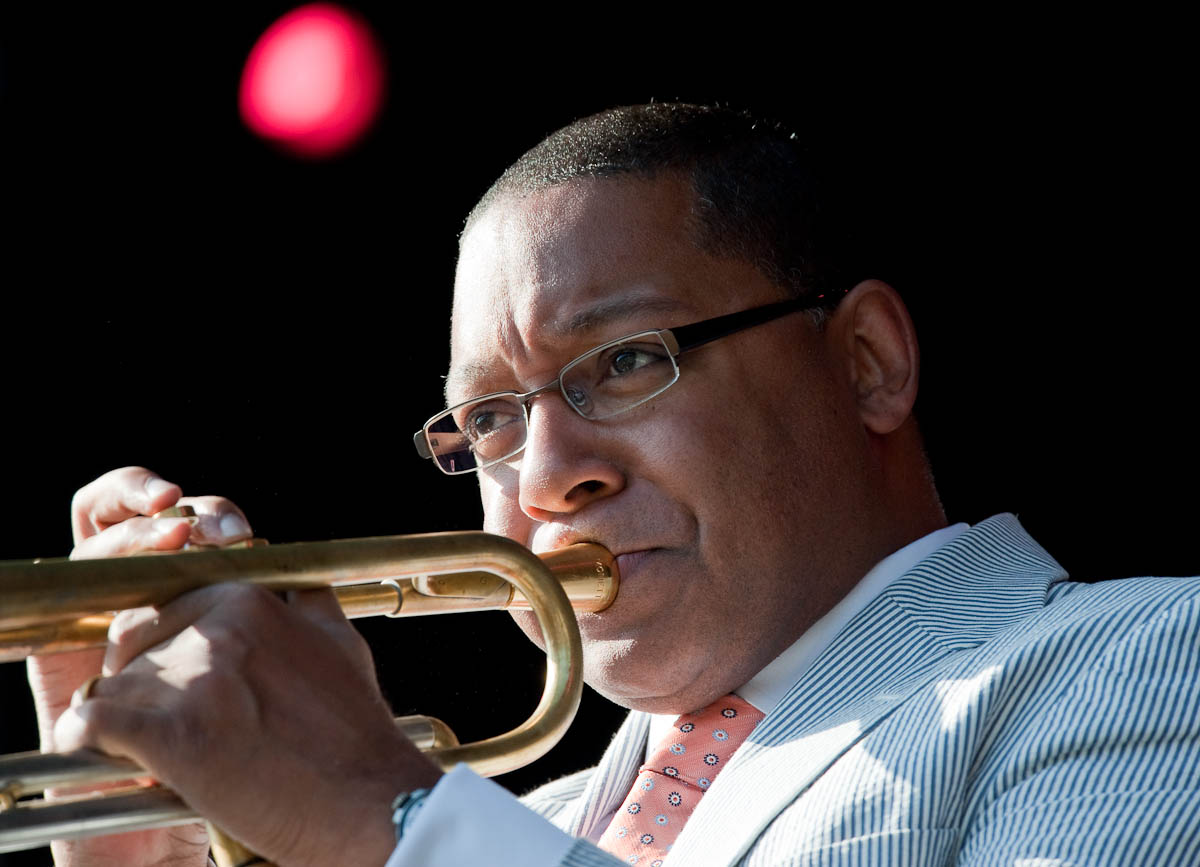
- Marsalis at the Oskar Schindler Performing Arts Center Seventh Annual Jazz Festival, 2009

Background information
- Born: Wynton Learson Marsalis; October 18, 1961 (age 64); New Orleans, Louisiana, U.S.
- Genres: Jazz; post-bop; mainstream; classical
- Occupations: Musician; composer; educator; artistic director
- Instrument: Trumpet
- Works: Wynton Marsalis discography
- Years active: 1980–present
- Labels: Columbia; Sony; Blue Note; Marsalis Music
- Spouse: Nicola Benedetti (m. 2024)
- Website: wyntonmarsalis.org
- Children: Jasper Armstrong Marsalis (son)
- Parent(s): Dolores Ferdinand Marsalis and Ellis Marsalis Jr.
- Relatives: Ellis Marsalis Sr. (grandfather); Branford Marsalis, Jason Marsalis and Delfeayo Marsalis (brothers)

Wynton Learson Marsalis (born October 18, 1961) is an American trumpeter, composer, music instructor, and the artistic director of Jazz at Lincoln Center. He has been active in promoting classical and jazz music, often to young audiences. Marsalis has won nine Grammy Awards, and his 1997 oratorio Blood on the Fields was the first jazz composition to win the Pulitzer Prize for Music. Marsalis is the only musician to have won a Grammy Award in both jazz and classical categories in the same year.

== Early years and education ==
Marsalis was born in New Orleans, Louisiana, on October 18, 1961, and grew up in the suburb of Kenner. He is the second of six sons born to Dolores Ferdinand Marsalis and Ellis Marsalis Jr., a pianist and music teacher. He was named after jazz pianist Wynton Kelly. Branford Marsalis is his older brother and Jason Marsalis and Delfeayo Marsalis are younger. All three are jazz musicians. While sitting at a table with trumpeters Al Hirt, Miles Davis, and Clark Terry, his father jokingly suggested that he might as well get Wynton a trumpet, too. Hirt volunteered to give him one, so at the age of six, Marsalis received his first trumpet.

Although he owned a trumpet when he was six years old, he did not practice much until he was 12. He attended Benjamin Franklin High School and the New Orleans Center for Creative Arts. He studied classical music at school and jazz at home with his father, and he played in funk bands and a marching band led by Danny Barker. Marsalis performed on trumpet publicly as the only black musician in the New Orleans Civic Orchestra. After winning a music contest at the age of 14, he performed Joseph Haydn's trumpet concerto with the New Orleans Philharmonic. Two years later he performed Brandenburg Concerto No. 2 in F Major by Bach. Aged 17, he was one of the youngest musicians admitted to Tanglewood Music Center. Marsalis applied to only two music colleges, the Juilliard School and Northwestern University. He was accepted to both schools and chose to attend the former.

== Career ==
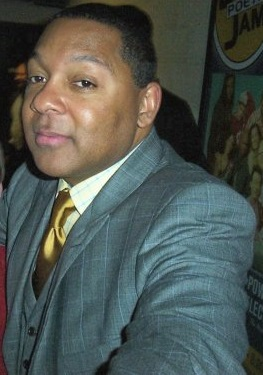
Marsalis backstage in 2007

In 1979, he moved to New York City to attend the Juilliard School for a Bachelor of Music in trumpet performance, leaving in 1981 without earning a degree. He intended to pursue a career in classical music. In 1980, he toured Europe as a member of the Art Blakey band, becoming a member of The Jazz Messengers and remaining with Blakey until 1982. He changed his mind about his career and turned to jazz. He has said that years of playing with Blakey influenced his decision. He recorded for the first time with Blakey and one year later he went on tour with Herbie Hancock. After signing a contract with Columbia, he recorded his first solo album. In 1982, he established a quintet with his brother Branford Marsalis, Kenny Kirkland, Charnett Moffett, and Jeff "Tain" Watts. When Branford and Kenny Kirkland left three years later to record and tour with Sting, Marsalis formed a quartet, this time with Marcus Roberts on piano, Robert Hurst on double bass, and Watts on drums. After a while, the band expanded to include Wessell Anderson, Wycliffe Gordon, Eric Reed, Herlin Riley, Reginald Veal, and Todd Williams.

When asked about influences on his playing style, Marsalis cites Duke Ellington, Miles Davis, Harry Sweets Edison, Clark Terry, Dizzy Gillespie, Jelly Roll Morton, Charlie Parker, Wayne Shorter, Thelonious Monk, Cootie Williams, Ray Nance, Maurice André, and Adolph Hofner. Other influences include Clifford Brown, Freddie Hubbard, and Adolph Herseth.

Marsalis has established himself as a lecturer and musical ambassador, a "21st-century Leonard Bernstein" according to one writer.

== Jazz at Lincoln Center ==
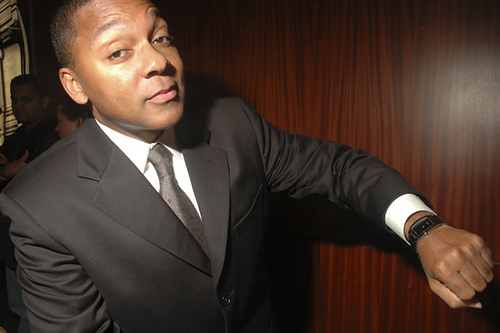
Marsalis at Lincoln Center in 2004

In 1987, Marsalis helped start the Classical Jazz summer concert series at Lincoln Center in New York City. The success of the series led to Jazz at Lincoln Center becoming a department at Lincoln Center, then to becoming an independent entity in 1996 alongside organizations such as the New York Philharmonic and the Metropolitan Opera. Marsalis became artistic director of the center and the musical director of the band, the Jazz at Lincoln Center Orchestra. The orchestra performs at its home venue, Rose Hall, goes on tour, visits schools, appears on radio and television, and produces albums through its label, Blue Engine Records.

In 2011, Marsalis and rock guitarist Eric Clapton performed together in a Jazz at Lincoln Center concert. The concert was recorded and released as the album Play the Blues: Live from Jazz at Lincoln Center.

In January 2026, Marsalis announced he would step down from his role as artistic director in July 2027, then serve as an advisor through June 2028, saying "It's the perfect time to identify the next generation of leadership... We want to make sure that we do what we can to nurture what we've already built with the understanding that this is an art form and it will continue to grow and the organization will continue to flourish." However, he will continue to perform on occasion with the Jazz at Lincoln Center Orchestra.

== Other work ==
In 1995, he hosted the educational program Marsalis on Music on public television, while during the same year National Public Radio broadcast his series Making the Music. Both programs won the George Foster Peabody Award, the highest award given in journalism.

In 2005, Marsalis played at Apple's "It's Showtime" Special Event on October 12, where the new iMac with Front Row, and iPod with Video were introduced. Following this, Marsalis also appeared in an iPod TV ad with his song "Sparks" in 2006.

In December 2011, Marsalis was named cultural correspondent for CBS This Morning. He is a member of the CuriosityStream Advisory Board. He serves as director of the Juilliard Jazz Studies program. In 2015, Cornell University appointed him A.D. White Professor-at-Large.

Marsalis was involved in writing, arranging, and performing music for the 2019 Daniel Pritzker film Bolden.

In addition to Jazz at Lincoln Center, Marsalis has also worked with the Philadelphia Orchestra as a composer for modern classical music. The orchestra premiered a Violin Concerto he composed in 2015, and a Tuba Concerto of his in 2021.

In December 2023, the Detroit Symphony Orchestra announced the extension of Jader Bignamini's contract with the orchestra as its music director through to the 2030–2031 season. At the same time, it announced a plan to record Marsalis's Blues Symphony with the conductor. The album came out in March 2025.

== Debate on jazz ==
Marsalis is generally associated with straight-ahead jazz, jazz that kept to the original instruments used in jazz and eschewed electronica that gained prominence in the 1970s and 1980s. In The Jazz Book, the authors list what Marsalis considers to be the fundamentals of jazz: blues, standards, a swing beat, tonality, harmony, craftsmanship, and mastery of the tradition beginning with New Orleans jazz up to Ornette Coleman. Tara Hall has written that Marsalis's "selective knowledge of jazz history (considering post-1965 avant-garde playing to be outside of jazz and 1970s fusion to be barren) is unfortunately influenced by the somewhat eccentric beliefs of Stanley Crouch." In The New York Times in 1997, pianist Keith Jarrett said Marsalis "imitates other people's styles too well ... His music sounds like a high school trumpet player to me".

Bassist Stanley Clarke said, "All the guys that are criticizing—like Wynton Marsalis and those guys—I would hate to be around to hear those guys playing on top of a groove!" But Clarke also said, "These things I've said about Wynton are my criticism of him, but the positive things I have to say about him outweigh the negative. He has brought respectability back to jazz."

When he met Miles Davis, one of his idols, Davis said: "So here's the police ..." For his part, Marsalis compared Miles Davis's embrace of rock and pop music (most notably in his 1970 album Bitches Brew) to "a general who has betrayed his country". Marsalis has called rap "hormone driven pop music" and said that hip hop "reinforces destructive behavior at home and influences the world's view of the Afro American in a decidedly negative direction."

Marsalis responded to criticism by saying: "You can't enter a battle and expect not to get hurt." He has said that losing the freedom to criticize is "to accept mob rule, it is a step back towards slavery."

== Personal life ==
Marsalis is the son of the late jazz musician Ellis Marsalis Jr. (pianist), grandson of Ellis Marsalis Sr., and brother of Branford (saxophonist), Delfeayo (trombonist and producer), and Jason (drummer). Marsalis also has five children, three sons and two daughters, including a son, Jasper Armstrong Marsalis, who is a music producer known professionally as Slauson Malone 1, and a daughter named Oni Marsalis who has performed with her father as a singer. In July 2025, an article in The Daily Telegraph confirmed that Scottish violinist Nicola Benedetti, whom he met when he was 42 and she was 17, is married to Marsalis, and she is the mother of his youngest child, daughter Elise Marsalis.

Marsalis was raised Catholic.

== Awards and honors ==
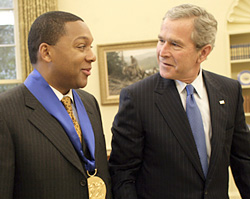
Marsalis received the National Medal of Arts from President George W. Bush in 2005.

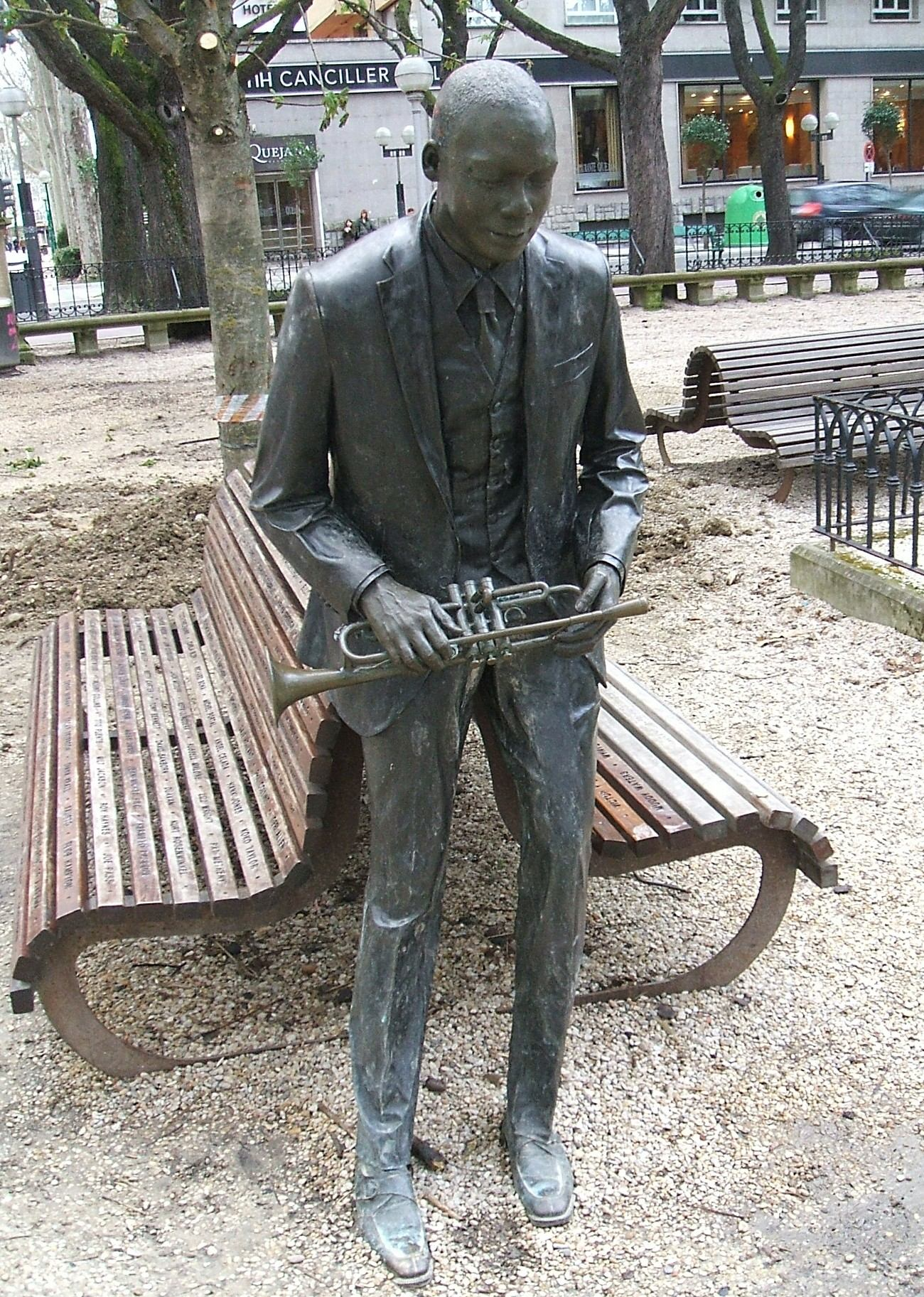
Statue dedicated to Marsalis in Vitoria-Gasteiz, Spain

In 1983, at the age of 22, he became the only musician to win Grammy Awards in jazz and classical music during the same year. At the award ceremonies the next year, he won again in both categories.

After his first album came out in 1982, Marsalis won polls in DownBeat magazine for Musician of the Year, Best Trumpeter, and Album of the Year. In 2017, he was one of the youngest members to be inducted into the DownBeat Hall of Fame.

In 1997, he became the first jazz musician to win the Pulitzer Prize for Music for his oratorio Blood on the Fields. In a note to him, Zarin Mehta wrote, "I was not surprised at your winning the Pulitzer Prize for Blood on the Fields. It is a broad, beautifully painted canvas that impresses and inspires. It speaks to us all...I'm sure that, somewhere in the firmament, Buddy Bolden, Louis Armstrong and legions of others are smiling down on you."

Wynton Marsalis has won the National Medal of Arts, the National Humanities Medal, and been named an NEA Jazz Master. In 2001, he was also named a UN Messenger of Peace.

Approximately seven million copies of his recordings have been sold worldwide. He has toured in 30 countries and on every continent except Antarctica.

He was given the Louis Armstrong Memorial Medal and the Algur H. Meadows Award for Excellence in the Arts. He was inducted into the American Academy of Achievement and was dubbed an Honorary Dreamer by the I Have a Dream Foundation. The New York Urban League awarded Marsalis the Frederick Douglass Medallion for distinguished leadership. The American Arts Council presented him with the Arts Education Award.

He won the Dutch Edison Award and the French Grand Prix du Disque. The Mayor of Vitoria, Spain, gave him the city's gold medal, its most coveted distinction. In 1996, Britain's senior conservatoire, the Royal Academy of Music, made him an honorary member, the academy's highest decoration for a non-British citizen. The city of Marciac, France, erected a bronze statue in his honor for the key role he played in the story of the festival. The French Ministry of Culture gave him the rank of Knight in the Order of Arts and Literature. In 2008, he received France's highest distinction, the insignia Chevalier of the Legion of Honour. In 2022, he received the Dr. Maria Montessori Ambassador Award from the American Montessori Society for his contributions to music, education, and the development of artistic excellence among future generations. In 2023, he won the Praemium Imperiale.

He has received honorary degrees from the Frost School of Music at the University of Miami (1994), University of Scranton (1996), Kenyon College (2019), New York University, Columbia, Connecticut College, Harvard, Howard, Northwestern, Princeton, Vermont, the State University of New York, and the University of Michigan (2023).

=== Grammy Awards ===
Best Jazz Instrumental Solo

- Think of One (1983)
- Hot House Flowers (1984)
- Black Codes (From the Underground) (1985)

Best Jazz Instrumental Album, Individual or Group

- Black Codes (From the Underground) (1985)
- J Mood (1986)
- Marsalis Standard Time, Vol. I (1987)

Best Instrumental Soloist(s) Performance (with orchestra)

- Raymond Leppard (conductor), Wynton Marsalis and the National Philharmonic Orchestra for Haydn, Hummel, L. Mozart: Trumpet Concertos (1983)
- Raymond Leppard (conductor), Wynton Marsalis and the English Chamber Orchestra for Wynton Marsalis, Edita Gruberova: Handel, Purcell, Torelli, Fasch, Molter (1984)

Best Spoken Word Album for Children

- Listen to the Storytellers (2000)

== Published works ==
- Sweet Swing Blues on the Road with Frank Stewart (1994)
- Marsalis on Music (1995)
- Jazz in the Bittersweet Blues of Life with Carl Vigeland (2002)
- To a Young Jazz Musician: Letters from the Road with Selwyn Seyfu Hinds (2004)
- Jazz ABZ: An A to Z Collection of Jazz Portraits with Paul Rogers (2007)
- Moving to Higher Ground: How Jazz Can Change Your Life with Geoffrey Ward (2008)
- Squeak, Rumble, Whomp! Whomp! Whomp!: A Sonic Adventure with Paul Rogers (2012)
