= Billboard Latin Music Award for Latin Jazz Album of the Year =

Former American music award

- Country: United States
- Presented by: Billboard
- First award: 1994
- Final award: 2008

Highlights
- Most awards: Arturo Sandoval (5)
- Most nominations: Poncho Sanchez (8)
- Website: billboardevents.com

The Billboard Latin Music Award for Latin Jazz Album of the Year was an honor that was presented annually at the Billboard Latin Music Awards, a ceremony which honors "the most popular albums, songs, and performers in Latin music, as determined by the actual sales, radio airplay, streaming and social data that shapes Billboard's weekly charts". Latin jazz is a form of jazz music which incorporates various sounds from Latin America.

The accolade for Latin Jazz Album of the Year was first presented at the inaugural Billboard Latin Music Awards in 1994 to Uruguayan musician Roberto Perera's Dreams & Desires (1992). From 1994 to 1998, only winners were announced at the conferences. Nominees were first presented in 1999 after Billboard began the Latin Music Awards on Telemundo. Cuban musician Arturo Sandoval is the most awarded artist with five wins. His records, Danzón (Dance On) (1994) and Hot House (1998), are both winners of the category, and also received the Grammy Award for Best Latin Jazz Album. Latin Soul by Poncho Sanchez is the only record to have been nominated more than once. It was nominated in 2000 and won the award in 2001. Chucho Valdés holds the record for the most nominations without a win, with four. The accolade was last presented in 2008 and discontinued a year later.

== Recipients ==
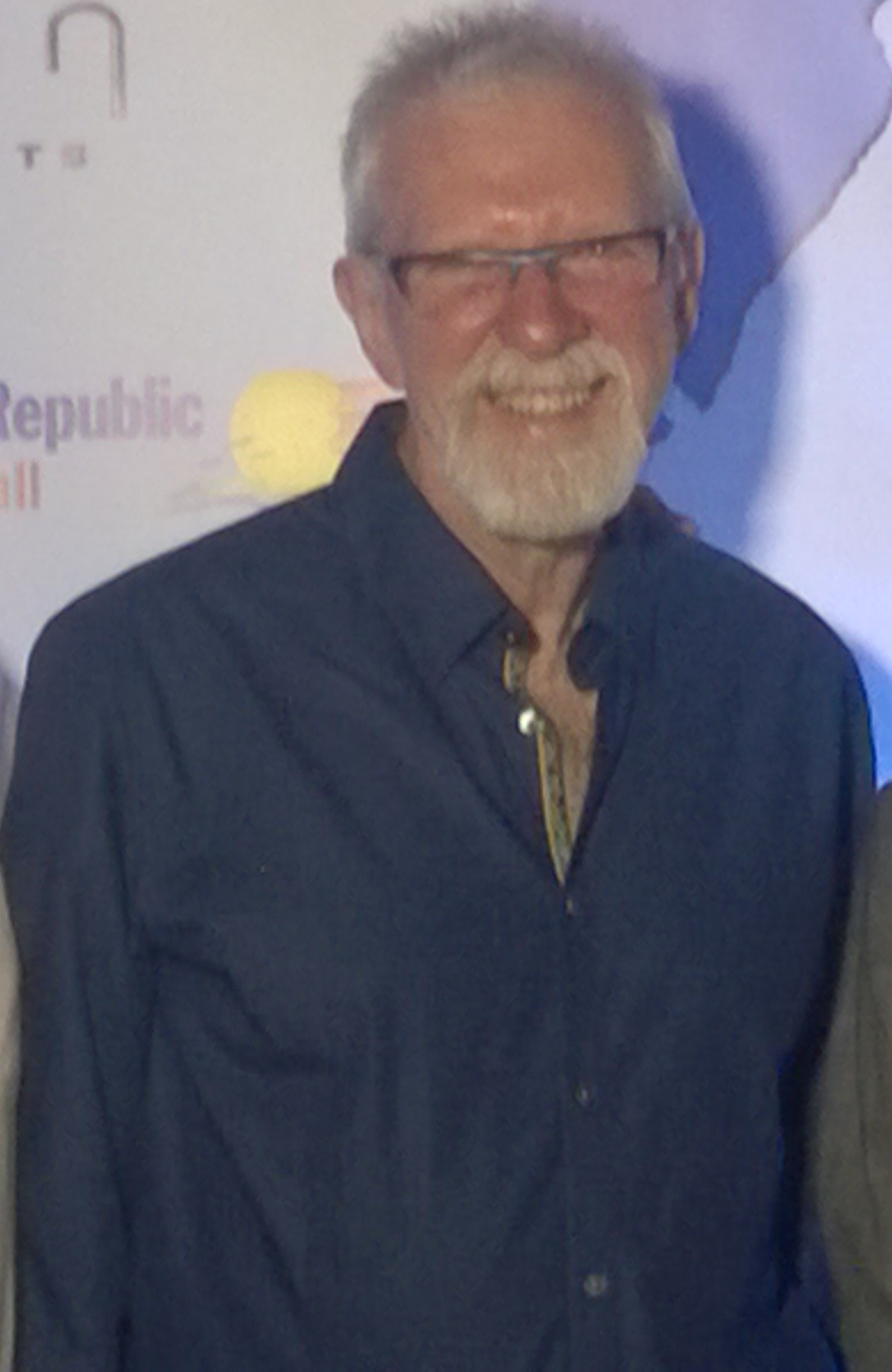
Uruguayan musician, Roberto Perera, first recipient of the award in 1994

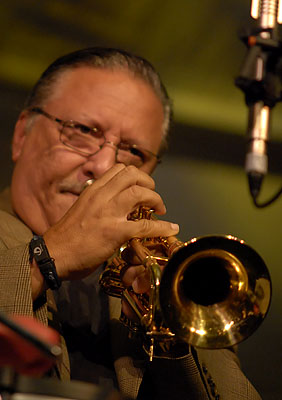
Cuban musician Arturo Sandoval, the most awarded performer with five wins

| Year | Winner(s) | Work | Nominees | Ref. |
|---|---|---|---|---|
| 1994 | Roberto Perera | Dreams & Desires | Nominations were not provided prior to 1999 | |
| 1995 | Arturo Sandoval | Danzón (Dance On) | Nominations were not provided prior to 1999 | |
| 1996 | Arturo Sandoval | Arturo Sandoval & The Latin Train | Nominations were not provided prior to 1999 | |
| 1997 | Tito Puente and La India with the Count Basie Orchestra | Jazzin' | Nominations were not provided prior to 1999 | |
| 1998 | Herb Alpert | Passion Dance | Nominations were not provided prior to 1999 | |
| 1999 | Arturo Sandoval | Hot House | Chucho Valdés — Bele Bele en la Habana; David Sánchez — Obsesión; Poncho Sanchez — Afro-Cuban Fantasy | |
| 2000 | Los Hombres Calientes | Los Hombres Calientes | Gonzalo Rubalcaba — Inner Voyage; Poncho Sanchez — Latin Soul; Chucho Valdés — Briyumba Palo Congo | |
| 2001 | Poncho Sanchez | Latin Soul | Marc Ribot — ¡Muy Divertido!; Poncho Sanchez — Soul of the Conga; Chucho Valdés — Live at the Village Vanguard | |
| 2002 | Poncho Sanchez | Latin Spirits | Various artists — Calle 54; Los Hombres Calientes — Vol. 3: New Congo Square; Gonzalo Rubalcaba Trio — Supernova | |
| 2003 | Gato Barbieri | Shadow of the Cat | Michel Camilo — Triangulo; Arturo Sandoval — My Passion for the Piano; Chucho Valdés — Fantasia Cubana | |
| 2004 | Arturo Sandoval | Trumpet Evolution | Los Hombres Calientes — Vol. 4: Vodou Dance; Eddie Palmieri — Ritmo Caliente; Poncho Sanchez — Out of Sight | |
| 2005 | Paco de Lucía | Cositas Buenas | Marta Gómez — Cantos de Agua Dulce; Charlie Haden — Land of the Sun; Néstor Torres — Sin Palabras (Without Words) | |
| 2006 | Arturo Sandoval | Sandoval: Live at the Blue Note | Los Hombres Calientes — Vol. 5: Carnival; Eddie Palmieri — Listen Here!; Poncho Sanchez — Do It! | |
| 2007 | Eliane Elias | Around the City | Gonzalo Rubalcaba — Solo; Néstor Torres — Dances, Prayers, and Meditations For Peace | |
| 2008 | Luciana Souza | The New Bossa Nova | Marc Antoine — Hi-Lo Split; Poncho Sanchez — Raise Your Hand; Ricardo Scales — I'm Here | |

== See also ==
- Grammy Award for Best Latin Jazz Album
- Latin Grammy Award for Best Latin Jazz/Jazz Album
