= Mboya Nicholson =

Canadian pedagogue and pianist

Mboya Nicholson (born 1973), is a Canadian pedagogue and pianist in Edmonton, Canada.

== Early life ==
Nicholson was born in Edmonton, Alberta, where he studied classical piano as a child and developed an interest in jazz. After entering high school, he had started to teach himself to play in and after graduation began to study with Charlie Austin. After studying jazz piano at Grant MacEwan Community College, Nicholson began performing at the Edmonton City Jazz Festival and presenting concerts. Starting in 1999, he began study at the University of New Orleans. Seven years included studying with Ellis Marsalis Jr. and Harold Battiste and a tour with the University orchestra to Brazil.

== Career ==
Focused studies afforded Nicholson to book performances in many places including, Guadeloupe, Austria and Japan. He went on to earn his Master's degree and play with some of the most notable jazz performers, including saxophonists Sonny Fortune and Wes Anderson, drummers Herlin Riley and Jason Marsalis and trumpeters Jeremy Davenport and Wendell Brunious and Victor Goines. He has also performed for the Ambassador to the Vatican, and the Consul General of the Netherlands. In 1998, he was chosen to perform solo for trumpeter Wynton Marsalis.

His education in New Orleans and its jazz community affected his improvisational style and compositions. He has performed tribute concerts to Sidney Bechet, Fats Waller and Paul Robeson.

== Discography ==
- Mboya Nicholson - 2008
- Four Songs - 2016
