= Los Hombres Calientes, Vol. 3: New Congo Square =

New Congo Square

Studio album by Irvin Mayfield & Bill Summers
- Released: April 17, 2001
- Recorded: August 2000–January 2001
- Genre: Afro-Cuban jazz
- Label: Basin Street Records

Professional ratings
Review scores
Source	Rating
Allmusic	3/5 stars

New Congo Square is the third studio album released by the New Orleans–based Afro-Cuban jazz group Los Hombres Calientes, co-led by trumpeter Irvin Mayfield and Bill Summers. This marks the band's first album without drummer Jason Marsalis.

== Track listing ==
1. "Forforo Fo Firi" 4:55
2. "Intro" :06
3. "Brother Runnin' (Mark's Groove, Pt. 1)" 4:47
4. "Brother Getin' Caught (Mark's Groove, Pt. 2)" 3:23
5. "Fantizias de Samba" 3:59
6. "New Second Line (Mardi Gras 2001)" 7:19
7. "Jah Rastafarai" 3:13
8. "New Bus Stop" 5:24
9. "El Negro, Pt. 1" :32
10. "El Negro, Pt. 2" 3:33
11. "El Negro, Pt. 3" 3:05
12. "Dominicanos" :36
13. "Corcovado/Nocturnal Low Moan" 3:32
14. "Africa N.O. (Ed's Groove)" 3:13
15. "Sentimientos" 7:51
16. "Nyabingi" 1:13
17. "I Shot the Sheriff" 3:56
18. "Bandera" 2:39
19. "Digidall" 4:38
20. "Warrior Suite, Pt. 1" 2:10
21. "Warrior Suite, Pt. 2" 2:19
22. "Warrior Suite, Pt. 3" 1:10
23. "Call It What You Want" 4:58

== Personnel ==
- Composer - Antonio Carlos Jobim
- Bata, Bells, Bongos, Composer, Ganza, Nyabinghi Drums, Pandeiro, Primary Artist, Shekere, Surdo, Tamborim, Timbales, Tumbadora - Bill Summers
- Composer - Bob Marley
- Production Assistant - Carlos Martinez
- Vocals - Cornell Williams
- Producer, Trombone - Delfeayo Marsalis
- Vocals - Derwin "Big D" Perkins
- Vocals - Early Brooks
- Percussion - Eduardo Martinez
- Percussion - Freddy Prince
- Hair Stylist, Wardrobe - Gary Valentine
- Composer, Drums, Percussion, Vocals, Background Vocals - Horacio "El Negro" Hernandez
- Composer, Horn Arrangements, Primary Artist, Producer, Solo Instrumental, Trumpet, Muted Trumpet - Irvin Mayfield
- Tenor Saxophone - Irving Acao
- Composer, Guest Artist - Isaac Delgado
- Vocals, Background Vocals - Issac Delgado
- Trumpet - Jamil Sharif
- Art Direction, Make-Up, Photography - Jeff Strout
- Vocals, Background Vocals - John Boutte
- Trombone - Juan Carlos Marin
- Horn Arrangements - Juan Pablo Torres
- Solo Instrumental, Trumpet - Julio Padron
- Flute, Piccolo - Kent Jordan
- Guest Artist, Vocals - Kermit Ruffins
- Composer - Larry Batiste
- Primary Artist - Los Hombres Calientes
- Primary Artist - Los Hombres Calientes: Irving Mayfield & Bill Summers
- Executive Producer - Mark Samuels
- Trumpet - Michael Ray
- Mastering - Parker Dinkins
- Bata, Composer, Percussion, Timbales, Vocals, Background Vocals - Pedro Martinez
- Vocals - Phillip Frazier
- Vocals, Background Vocals - Phillip Manuel
- Drums - Rick Sebastian
- Composer, Keyboards, Piano, Production Assistant, Vocals - Ronald Markham
- Solo Instrumental, Trombone, Tuba, Vocals - Ronnel Johnson
- Engineer - Steve Reynolds
- Drums - Tony Ruption
- Composer, Piano - Victor Atkins
