= In the Bag (album) =

Studio album by Nat Adderley
- Released: 1962
- Recorded: May 9, 1962
- Genre: Jazz
- Length: 41:26
- Label: Jazzland

Nat Adderley chronology
Naturally! (1961)	In the Bag (1962)	Little Big Horn (1963)

In the Bag (also released as The Adderley Brothers in New Orleans) is an album by jazz cornetist Nat Adderley, released on the Jazzland label and featuring performances by Adderley with his brother Cannonball Adderley, Sam Jones, Nat Perrilliat, James Black, and Ellis Marsalis.

== Reception ==
The AllMusic review by Scott Yanow stated, "The repertoire they perform is quite fresh but there is less excitement than one might hope and the musicians do not really form a unified group sound despite some strong individual moments". The Penguin Guide to Jazz awarded the album 3 stars, stating, "In the Bag is welcome for a further glimpse of the brothers playing together but isn't specially exciting".

Professional ratings
Review scores
Source	Rating
AllMusic	2/5 stars
DownBeat	4.5/5 stars
The Penguin Guide to Jazz	3/4 stars

== Track listing ==
All compositions by Nat Adderley except as indicated

1. "In the Bag" - 6:23
2. "Sister Wilson" (James N. Black) - 3:20
3. "R.S.V.P." (Nat Adderley, Ellis Marsalis) - 3:58
4. "Low Brown" (Yusef Salim) - 4:42
5. "Mozart-In'" (Alvin Batiste) - 6:32
6. "New Arrival" (Black) - 5:35
7. "Chatterbox" (Batiste) - 6:36
8. "The Popeye" - 1:56 Bonus track on CD
9. "The Gospel Truth" - 2:24 Bonus track on CD

- Recorded in New Orleans on May 19, 1962

== Personnel ==
- Nat Adderley – cornet
- Cannonball Adderley - alto saxophone
- Nat Perrilliat - tenor saxophone
- Ellis Marsalis - piano
- Sam Jones - bass
- James N. Black - drums
