= Yvonne Busch =

American jazz musician and educator (1929–2014)

- Busch in 1962
- Born: October 18, 1929; New Orleans, Louisiana, U.S.
- Died: February 28, 2014 (aged 84); New Orleans, Louisiana, U.S.
- Occupation(s): Jazz musician and teacher

Yvonne Busch (October 18, 1929 – February 28, 2014) was a jazz musician and an influential music teacher in New Orleans.

== Life and career ==
Born to Edward and Bertha Scott Busch in the 9th Ward of New Orleans, Busch grew up in Tremé, which had an active music scene. The local music scene piqued her interest and at age eleven, on her own initiative, she left home to pursue a music education at Piney Woods Country Life School in Mississippi. She played the trumpet and toured with the school's all-female band Swinging Rays of Rhythm, performing at dances, clubs and USO events in the American South and Midwest.

In 1943, she returned to New Orleans and continued her education at the Gilbert Academy under T. LeRoy Davis, the music director of the school. Influenced by Davis, she played multiple instruments and decided to pursue a teaching career. She enrolled in the teacher-training program at Southern University in Baton Rouge. She was the first female member and assistant director of the university's jazz band.

In 1951, upon returning to New Orleans, she became a public school teacher and taught for 32 years – a year at Booker T. Washington, six years at Joseph S. Clark, and twenty five years at George Washington Carver high school. She was briefly a member of William Houston's big band, however she withdrew because of career demands. She also performed with the Dooky Chase Orchestra. As a teacher and band director she faced funding and instrument shortages and often used her own instruments and those of her acquaintances. She encouraged her students to play multiple instruments. She gave free private lessons and organized summer practice sessions for school bands. She directed large bands including marching bands. Many of her pupils went on to become notable musicians in their own right, such as Smokey Johnson, James Crawford, Herlin Riley, John Boudreaux, James Black, and Nat Perrilliat.

In 2005, her home was flooded during Hurricane Katrina. Subsequently she lived in the Dallas, Texas, area and returned to New Orleans in 2013. She died on February 28, 2014. She was funeralized at St. David Catholic Church in New Orleans.

== Legacy ==
Busch was the subject of a 2007 documentary film titled Legend in the Classroom: The Life Story of Ms. Yvonne Busch, produced and directed by a former student and professional photographer, Leonard Smith III. In 2012, the documentary was screened as part of the inaugural Sync Up Cinema, the film component of the Sync Up Music Conference, held at the New Orleans Museum of Art and which is affiliated with the New Orleans Jazz & Heritage Festival.
