= Jeremy Davenport =

American jazz trumpeter and singer

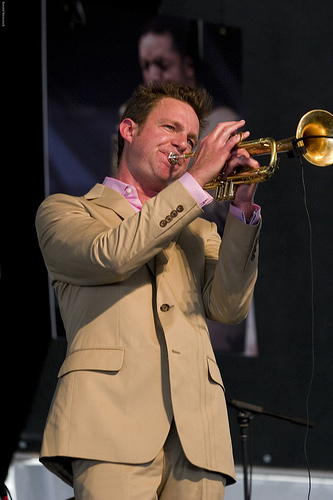
- Jeremy Davenport, New Orleans Jazz & Heritage Festival, 2007

Background information
- Born: 1970 (age 55–56); St. Louis, Missouri, U.S.
- Genres: Jazz
- Occupation: Musician
- Instrument: Trumpet
- Years active: 1990s–present
- Labels: Telarc, Basin Street
- Website: www.jeremydavenport.com

Jeremy Davenport (born 1970 in St. Louis, Missouri) is an American jazz trumpeter and singer based in New Orleans, Louisiana.

Jeremy Davenport was born in St. Louis, Missouri into a family of musicians. His mother has been a music educator for nearly 50 years and his father worked for 40 years for the St. Louis Symphony. From a young age Davenport studied and played with members and guests of the St. Louis Symphony, which included an early introduction to Wynton Marsalis.

Following high school, Davenport attended the Manhattan School of Music, under the direction of Raymond Mase. During this time, Wynton Marsallis introduced Davenport to Harry Connick, Jr. They persuaded Davenport to move to New Orleans. Davenport enrolled at University of New Orleans and then studied under Ellis Marsalis, Wynton's father, music educator, and jazz pianist.

After his tutelage from Wynton and Ellis Marsallis, Davenport toured internationally with Harry Connick Jr.'s Big Band for six years and then returned to New Orleans to play at Snug Harbor, a local jazz venue. He made a connection with chef Emeril Lagasse, leading to television appearances on a sit-com and Lagasse's cooking show. His media appearances also include Cosmopolitan, GQ, Travel + Leisure, People, The Tonight Show with Jay Leno, and The David Letterman Show. Davenport plays a mix of American jazz standards and his own songs.

Davenport plays regularly at The Davenport Lounge at The Ritz-Carlton, New Orleans.

== Discography ==
- Puttin' on the Ritz, Erich Kunzel, Cincinnati Pops, (1995)
- Maybe in a Dream (Telarc, 1997)
- Christmas Gumbo (2004)
- Jeremy Davenport (Telarc, 1996, 2005)
- Live at the Bistro (2005)
- We'll Dance 'Til Dawn (Basin Street, 2009)
