= Irvin Mayfield (album) =

Studio album by Irvin Mayfield
- Released: 1998
- Genre: Jazz
- Label: Basin Street
- Producer: Delfeayo Marsalis

Irvin Mayfield chronology
Irvin Mayfield (1998)	Live at the Blue Note (1999)

Professional ratings
Review scores
Source	Rating
AllMusic	link

Irvin Mayfield is the debut album by jazz trumpeter Irvin Mayfield as bandleader.

== Track listing ==
1. "The Great M.D." 9:03
2. "Right Here, Right Now" 5:59
3. "Body and Soul" 6:31
4. "Immaculate Conception" 6:55
5. "Midnight Theme" 9:06
6. "You're My Everything" 5:40
7. "Lascivious Intervention" 8:50
8. "Giant Steps" 3:22
9. "Ninth Ward Blues" 4:54

== Personnel ==
- Irvin Mayfield - trumpet, bandleader
- Peter Martin, Victor Atkins III - piano
- Ellis Marsalis (track 3) - piano
- David Pulphus, Reuben Rogers - double bass
- Delfeayo Marsalis - trombone
- Donald Harrison - alto saxophone
- Jaz Sawyer, Adonis Rose, Troy Davis - drums
