= Freedom Sound =

Freedom Sound may refer to:

- Freedom Sound (Poncho Sanchez album), 1997
- Freedom Sound (The Jazz Crusaders album), 1961

== See also ==
- Freedom of Sound, 2005 album by Bret Michaels
