= How Passion Falls =

Studio album by Irvin Mayfield
- Released: January 30, 2001
- Recorded: August 2–4, 2000
- Genre: Jazz
- Label: Basin Street
- Producer: Delfeayo Marsalis

Irving Mayfield chronology
Live at the Blue Note (1999)	How Passion Falls (2001)	Half Past Autumn Suite (2003)

Professional ratings
Review scores
Source	Rating
AllMusic	3/5 stars

How Passion Falls is an album by jazz trumpeter Irvin Mayfield that was released in 2001.

== Track listing ==
1. The Illusion 8:33
2. Adam and Eve 6:49
3. The Obsession 6:46
4. Othello and Desdemona 6:18
5. The Denial 8:29
6. Romeo and Juliet 2:57
7. The Affair 4:35
8. David and Bathsheba 7:27
9. The Reality 10:13

== Personnel ==
- Irvin Mayfield - trumpet, bandleader
- Richard Johnson, Ellis Marsalis - piano
- Edwin Livingston - double bass
- Delfeayo Marsalis - trombone, producer
- Aaron Fletcher - alto saxophone, soprano saxophone
- Donald Harrison - alto saxophone (track 8 only)
- Jaz Sawyer, Bill Summers - drums
