= Half Past Autumn Suite =

Studio album by Irvin Mayfield
- Released: January 25, 2003
- Recorded: November 27–29, 2001
- Genre: Jazz, mainstream jazz, Dixieland
- Length: 61:14
- Label: Basin Street

Irvin Mayfield chronology
How Passion Falls (2001)	Half Past Autumn Suite (2003)	Strange Fruit (2005)

Professional ratings
Review scores
Source	Rating
AllMusic	link

Half Past Autumn Suite is an album by jazz trumpeter Irvin Mayfield that was released in 2003 as a tribute to Gordon Parks, a photographer and pianist.

In 2000, Parks's photographs were given an exhibit at the New Orleans Museum of Art. The CD version of the album contained a CD-ROM with photos from the exhibition that could be downloaded, two videos of recording sessions, and an interview with Parks.

Parks and Mayfield performed a duet on "Wind Song". Wynton Marsalis played trumpet on the song "Blue Dawn". His brother, Delfeayo, produced the album and made a guest appearance on trombone.

== Track listing ==
All tracks are written by Irving Mayfield except where noted.

No.	Title	Length
1.	"Moonscape"	7:58
2.	"Love Petals"	4:20
3.	"Evening"	6:33
4.	"Jazz Poetry No. 2"	3:23
5.	"Flowerscape"	9:04
6.	"Fatimah"	5:02
7.	"Jazz Poetry No. 1"	4:52
8.	"Blue Dawn"	8:07
9.	"Wind Song" (Gordon Parks)	4:59
10.	"Toward Infinity"	6:33

== Personnel ==
- Irvin Mayfield – trumpet
- Gordon Parks – piano
- Wynton Marsalis – trumpet
- Delfeayo Marsalis – trombone, producer
- Aaron Fletcher – alto saxophone, soprano saxophone
- Marcus Strickland – tenor saxophone
- Edwin Livingston – double bass
- Jaz Sawyer – drums
- Richard Johnson – piano
- Mark Samuels – executive producer
- William Samuels – associate producer
- Steve Reynolds – engineer
- Todd Parker – engineer
- Jalmus – mixing
