= Roland Guerin =

American bassist/singer/songwriter

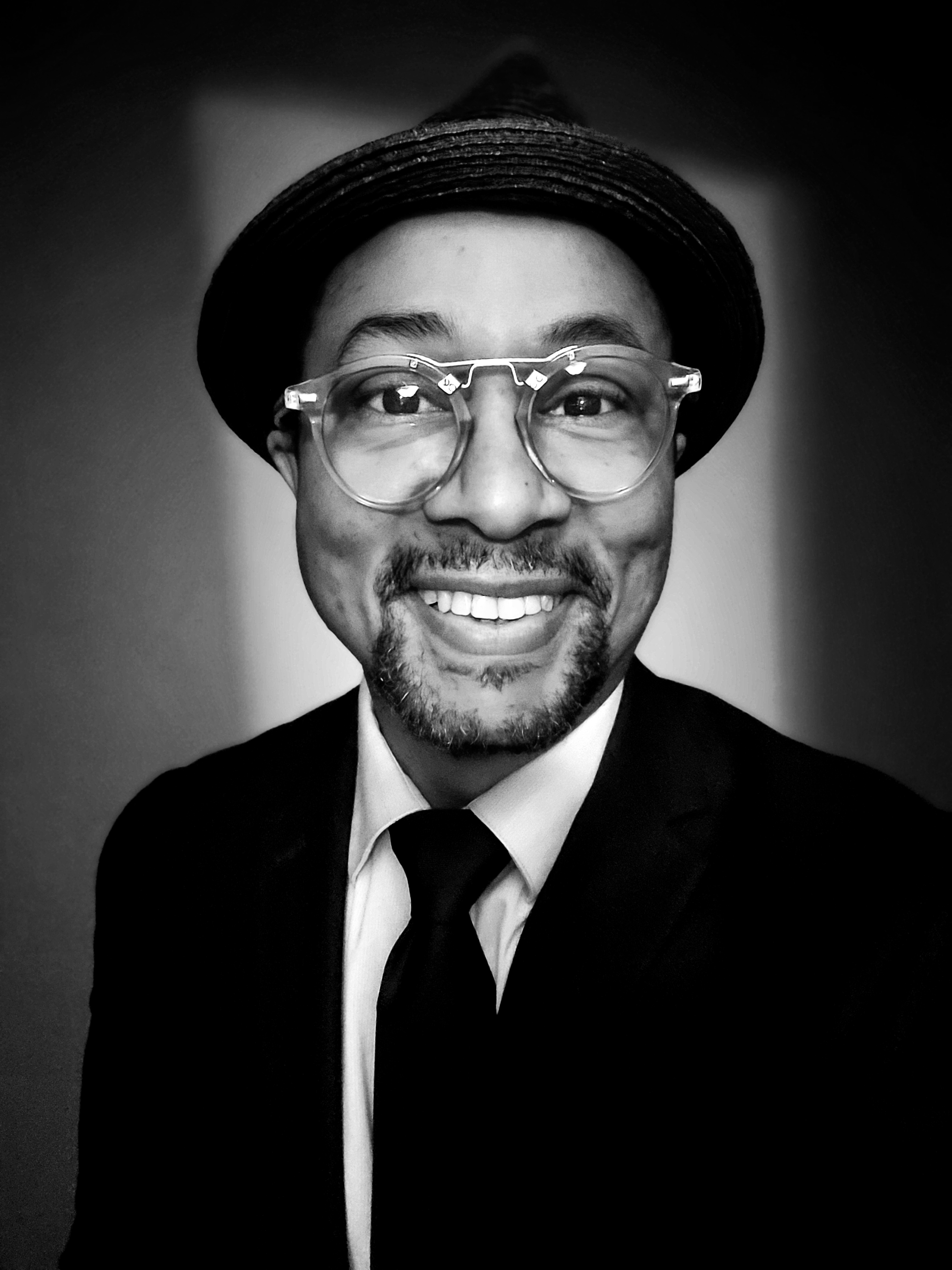

Background information
- Born: November 15, 1968 (age 57); Fort Polk, Louisiana
- Genres: Jazz; Prog Rock
- Occupations: Bassist, singer-songwriter
- Instruments: Bass; Guitar
- Years active: 1994–present
- Label: Louisiana Red Hot Records
- Website: https://www.rolandguerin.com/

Roland Guerin is an American bassist, composer, singer and songwriter born in Fort Polk, Louisiana. Guerin began playing bass at age 11, learning from his zydeco bass-playing mother.

== Musical career ==
Guerin has played bass in bands including Alvin Batiste's The Jazztronauts while earning a degree in marketing at Southern University, The Marcus Roberts Trio, Allen Toussaint and Dr. John as his music director.

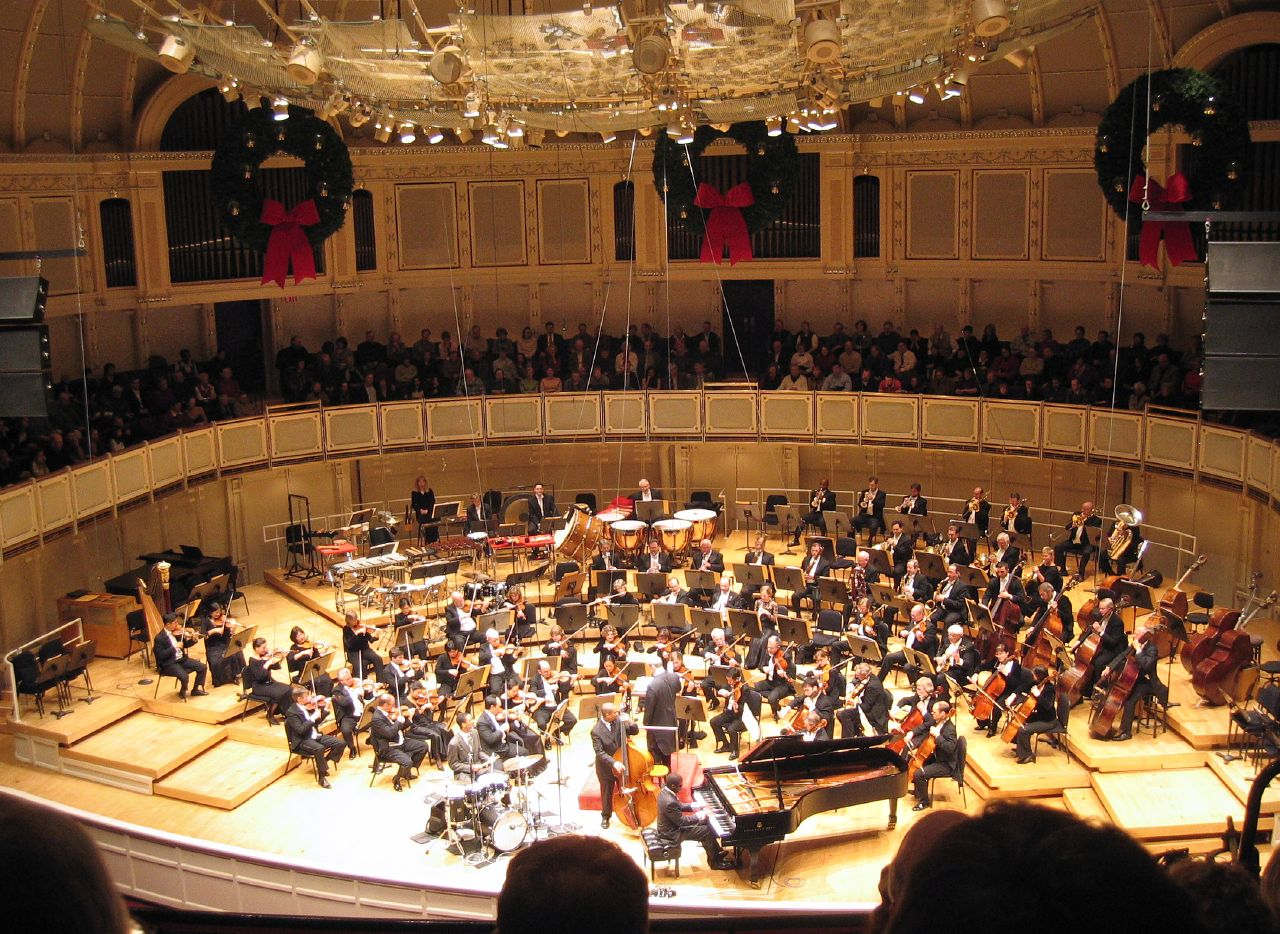
(blind) Pianist Marcus Roberts, drummer Jason Marsalis and bassist Roland Guerin performed George Gershwin's Rhapsody in Blue with the Chicago Symphony Orchestra to a packed house at Symphony Center.

Guerin joined the Allen Toussaint Band in 2008, touring with him until Toussaint died in 2015. He then joined the band of Dr. John, becoming The Night Tripper's final music director. Guerin has toured as bassist with artists including Jimmy Scott, John Scofield, Frank Morgan, Vernel Fournier, Gerry Mulligan, James Singleton, Jason Marsalis, George Benson, Ellis Marsalis, John Scofield, Wynton Marsalis, Paul Gilbert and Brian Blade and the Fellowship Band.

He performed at UNESCO's first annual International Jazz Day in New Orleans at a sunrise concert in 2012, along with Herbie Hancock.

Guerin resumed touring with the Marcus Roberts Trio in 2022, playing Gershwin at The Grange in Hampshire UK, and in 2023 at the Mahalia Jackson Theater in New Orleans.

He debuted his genre Prog:Funk at a New Orleans Jazz & Heritage Foundation showcase, and on radio station WWOZ-FM in 2024.

== Recording ==
Guerin performed on Marcus Roberts' In Honor of Duke, a New York Times Album of the Week in 2009, on Allen Toussaint's album Connected, The Marsalis Family, and Dr. John's single "The Bare Necessities" for Disney's live action movie The Jungle Book.

Guerin's first album The Winds of the New Land was released in 1997. His 2019 album Grass Roots was his first on Louisiana Red Hot Records. "Stick to the Basics" featured lyrics Toussaint gave Guerin, to add his own music and create the song.

In 2021, Guerin won Burl Audio's International Song of the Year Contest with the single "28 Days" about masking up for four consecutive weeks, winning gear for his home studio. His subsequent EP "Prog:Funk" was released on Louisiana Red Hot Records in February, 2024. OffBeat Magazine wrote of "Prog:Funk" that drawing inspiration from his years as the music director for Dr. John and bassist for Allen Toussaint, "Guerin has honed his signature bass grooves, infusing them with the soulful essence of New Orleans."

== Albums ==
- The Winds of the New Land (1997)
- You Don't Have to See it to Believe it (2000)
- Live at the Blue Note (2002)
- Groove, Swing and Harmony (2003)
- A Different World (2011)
- Black Coffee (2016)
- Grass Roots (2019) [Louisiana Red Hot Records]
- Prog Funk (2024) [Louisiana Red Hot Records]
