= Norbert Susemihl =

German jazz musician and bandleader

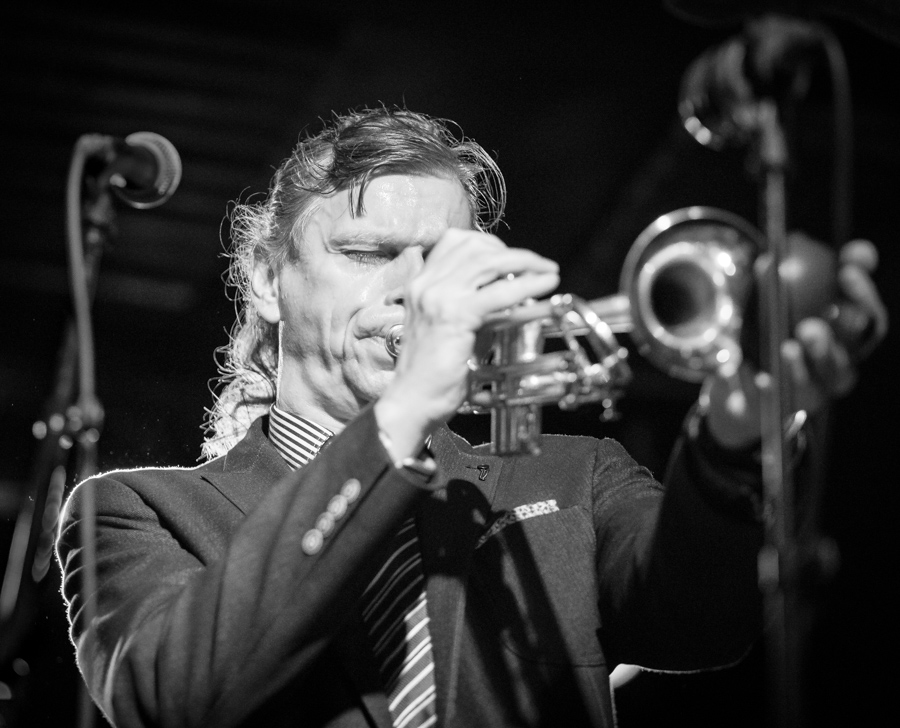
- Susemihl performing at the 2017 Oslo Jazz Festival

Background information
- Born: August 26, 1956 (age 69); Hamburg, West Germany
- Genres: Jazz
- Occupations: Musician, Bandleader, Promoter
- Instruments: Trumpet, Flugelhorn, Vocal, Drums
- Label: Sumi Records
- Website: www.susemihl.eu

Norbert Susemihl (born August 26, 1956) is a German trumpeter, drummer, singer, and bandleader. He is a promoter of New Orleans Jazz and New Orleans Music.

== Early years ==
Susemihl grew up in Hamburg, Germany. He started playing music at the age of 14 on guitar with his first band "The Shepherds", which he co-founded with Thomas l'Etienne. This was a vocal group which sang Spirituals and Gospel-Songs, inspired by the "Golden Gate Quartet". After a year, in 1971, Susemihl started to play trumpet, and the band changed its name to "Papa Tom's Lamentation Jazzband" playing and studying Traditional Jazz from then on.

== Musical career ==
In 1978 and 1979 Susemihl made his first trips to New Orleans. In 1980 he lived there for a year to study New Orleans Jazz and the lifestyle and culture that made and shaped this music. Through all of the 80s, Susemihl lived in New Orleans for 4 months each year and studied and played regularly with almost all of the local musicians, from the older traditional players to the younger generation, covering all styles of New Orleans Music.

He has made recordings in New Orleans with among others Willie Humphrey, "Father" Al Lewis (banjoist), Fred Lonzo, Lars Edegran, Orange Kellin, Frank Fields, Ernie Elly, "CoCoMo Joe" Joseph Barthelemy, Jason Marsalis, Louis Ford, Daniel Farrow, Kerry Lewis, Seva Venet, and vocalist Wanda Rouzan.

Since 1986 he has been leading his Hamburg based bands "Norbert Susemihl's Arlington Annex" and Norbert Susemihl's Arlington Brassband".

His main formation today is "Norbert Susemihl's Joyful Gumbo" which was formed in 2002 and is based in Denmark.

Susemihl tours and performs with his own bands, and as a guest with different bands in Europe and New Orleans. He is considered as one of the leading contemporary trumpeters in the New Orleans style.

As his most important influences on trumpet Susemihl cites: Louis Armstrong, Bunk Johnson, De De Pierce, Alvin Alcorn, Jack Willis, Thomas Jefferson (musician), Wynton Marsalis, Kid Thomas Valentine, and Percy Humphrey.

== Selected discography ==
=== As leader ===
- Norbert Susemihl's Joyful Gumbo – Featuring Chloe Feoranzo & Jason Marsalis (Sumi Records - 2018)
- Norbert Susemihl - A Tribute to the Louis Armstrong All Stars - Live at Maribo Jazzfestival (Sumi Records - 2014)
- Romantic New Orleans - With Daniel Farrow, Seva Venet and Kerry Lewis (Sumi Records - 2013)
- Norbert Susemihl – Night on Frenchmen Street - With Jason Marsalis, Erika Lewis, Shaye Cohn, Kerry Lewis and Gregory Agid (Sumi Records - 2012)
- Norbert Susemihl's Joyful Gumbo – New Orleans Reflections (Sumi Records - 2011)
- Norbert Susemihl's New Orleans All Stars – That Lucky Old Sun - Church Concert - With Jason Marsalis and Louis Ford (Sumi Records - 2011)
- Norbert Susemihl's Arlington Brassband – Gladrags - New Orleans Street Music (Sumi Records - 2011)
- New Orleans Blues – Erica, Norbert & Shaye - With Erika Lewis and Shaye Cohn (Sumi Records - 2010)
- Norbert Susemihl's New Orleans All Stars – Live at Maribo Jazzfestival-Denmark - With Jason Marsalis and Louis Ford (Sumi Records - 2008)
- Norbert Susemihl's Joyful Gumbo – Church Concerts - Sorgenfri Church - Vol. 5 (Music Mecca - 2005) Track 1,2,3
- Norbert Susemihl's Arlington Annex – In Concert - Femo Jazzfestival 1999 - Director's Cut (Sumi Records - 2000)
- Norbert Susemihl's Arlington Annex – High Heels (WeltWunder Records - 1995)
- Norbert Susemihl's Arlington Annex – Live at Congress Centrum - Hamburg (Sumi Records - 1990)
- Norbert Susemihl's Arlington Annex and Cocomo Joe's Jackson Square Trio (Sumi Records - 1988)
- Norbert Susemihl's Arlington Annex – Featuring Wanda Rouzan (Sumi Records - 1988)
- Norbert Susemihl's Arlington Annex – Live in Hamburg (Sumi Records - 1987)
- Norbert Susemihl's Arlington Annex – Live in Ascona (Sumi Records - 1987)
- Norbert Susemihl's Arlington Annex – Live in Hamburg (Sumi Records - 1986)
- Papa Tom's Lamentation Jazzband – Festa New Orleans Music Ascona (1985) Track B3
- Papa Tom's Lamentation Jazzband – The unissued Torhaus session - Hamburg - 1984 (Sumi Records - 1984)
- Papa Tom's Lamentation Jazzband – Live at Cotton Club - Hamburg - 1983 (Summer - 1983)
- Papa Tom's Lamentation Jazzband – Feel The Jazz Vol. 6 - 1982 (Spronk - 1982)
- Papa Tom's Lamentation Jazzband – The unissued concert - Almelo - Netherlands - 1981 (Sumi Records - 1981)

=== As sideman ===
- Doc Houlind's New Orleans Revival Band – Live at Sorgenfri Church (DH Records 2014) On drums
- Nadia and the Rabbits – Noblesse Oblique (Mescal 2012) Track 1-5
- Wanda Rouzan – Mama Roux (2010) Track 1-6
- New Orleans Delight – Featuring Lee Gunnes & Norbert Susemihl (Music Mecca 2004)
- New Orleans Delight – Featuring Kristin Lomholt & Norbert Susemihl - My Little Girl (Music Mecca 2001)
- Max Lager's New Orleans Stompers – Featuring Sammy Rimington & Norbert Susemihl (2001) Track 1-4
- New Orleans Delight – Featuring Norbert Susemihl & Mike Lund - Enjoy Yourself (Music Mecca 1999)
- New Orleans Delight – Church Concerts '99 (Music Mecca 1999)
- Caledonia Jazzband – Is You Is Or Is You Ain't? (Hot Club 1991)
- Wanda Rouzan – A Taste Of New Orleans (1989) Track 1-2
- Willie Humphrey – In New Orleans (GHB Records 1988)
- Father Al Lewis With Lars Edegran's New Orleans Jazz Band - Featuring "Father" Al Lewis (banjoist) (GHB Records 1988)
- New Orleans Quarter – Christmas Jazz (1984)
- New Orleans Quarter – NOQ Record 1 (1984)
- Savoy Ballroom Orchestra – Tanzmelodien Aus New Orleans (1982)
- New Orleans Rascals and their guests (1980)
