= Little Big Horn (album) =

Studio album by Nat Adderley
- Released: 1963
- Recorded: September 23 & October 4, 1963
- Genre: Jazz
- Length: 39:05
- Label: Riverside

Nat Adderley chronology
| In the Bag (1962) | Little Big Horn (1963) | Autobiography (1964) |

Little Big Horn (also released as Natural Soul) is an album by jazz cornetist Nat Adderley, released on the Riverside label and featuring performances by Adderley with Junior Mance, Kenny Burrell/Jim Hall Bob Cranshaw, and Mickey Roker.

== Reception ==
The AllMusic review by Scott Yanow states, "A fine obscurity recorded at a time when Nat was one of the stars of his brother Cannonball Adderley's Sextet". The Penguin Guide to Jazz awarded the album 4 stars, stating, "it's hard to understand why such a quiet gem has slipped through the net".

Professional ratings
Review scores
| Source | Rating |
|---|---|
| AllMusic | 3/5 stars |
| The Encyclopedia of Popular Music | 4/5 stars |
| The Penguin Guide to Jazz | 4/4 stars |
| The Rolling Stone Jazz Record Guide | 3/5 stars |

== Track listing ==
All compositions by Nat Adderley

1. "El Chico" - 6:42
2. "Foo Foo" - 4:11
3. "Loneliness" - 4:14
4. "Little Big Horn" - 5:20
5. "Half-Time" - 4:48
6. "Broadway Lady" - 4:19
7. "Roses for Your Pillow" - 5:11
8. "Hustle with Russell" - 4:20

- Recorded in New York City on September 23, 1963 (tracks 2–4 & 8) and October 4, 1963 (tracks 1 & 5–7)

== Personnel ==
- Nat Adderley – cornet
- Junior Mance – piano
- Jim Hall (tracks 1 & 5–7), Kenny Burrell (tracks 2–4 & 8) – guitar
- Bob Cranshaw – bass
- Mickey Roker – drums
