= Danzón (Dance On) =

Studio album by Arturo Sandoval
- Released: 1994
- Recorded: October 10–15 & November 24, 1993: Mixed: October 18–22 & November 28–29, 1993
- Studios: Midiland and Crescent Moon Studios (Miami, Florida): Sound Works (Houston, Texas)
- Genre: Latin jazz
- Label: GRP
- Producer: Arturo Sandoval: Richard Eddy

Danzón (Dance On) is an album by Arturo Sandoval, released through GRP Records in 1994. In 1995, the album won Sandoval the Grammy Award for Best Latin Jazz Performance and the Billboard Latin Music Award for Latin Jazz Album of the Year.

== Track listing ==
All songs written by Arturo Sandoval, except where noted.

1. "Conga (Intro)" [featuring Bill Cosby] - 1:13
2. "Africa" [featuring Gloria Estefan] - 5:41
3. "Groovin' High" (Dizzy Gillespie) - 5:03
4. "A Mis Abuelos" - 5:24
5. "Tres Palabras" [featuring Vicki Carr] (Ray Gilbert, Osvaldo Farrés) - 4:36
6. "Danzón" - 6:16
7. "Susvito" [featuring Willy Chirino] (María Aurora Gómez) - 5:45
8. "Conjunto" - 6:01
9. "Guaguanco" - 6:00
10. "Coconut Grove" - 6:21
11. "Conga (Revisited)" [featuring Bill Cosby] - 1:24

== Personnel ==
- Arturo Sandoval – trumpet (1–4, 6–11), lead vocals (1, 11), percussion (1, 3, 4, 6, 8–11), acoustic piano (2, 7), scat (3), synthesizers (4), handclaps (4), flugelhorn (5, 8), vocals (7, 9), timbales (7)
- Richard Eddy – synthesizers (2, 7, 9, 10), drums (2, 7, 9, 10), Rhodes electric piano (5), bass (5)
- Danilo Perez – acoustic piano (3, 6, 10)
- Felix Gomez – acoustic piano (4)
- Rene Toledo – guitars (2, 5), acoustic guitar (4)
- Juanito Márquez – tres (9)
- Sal Cueves – bass (3, 6)
- Eddie Rivera – bass (4)
- Orlando Hernández – drums (3–6), handclaps (4)
- Bill Cosby – vocals (1, 11), percussion (1, 11), timbales (1, 11)
- Carlos Gomez – percussion (1, 5, 6, 10, 11), chekeré (2), iya (2), congas (3, 9), bongos (4), guiro (7)
- Rigoberto Herrera – congas (1, 7, 11), okoncolo (2), sticks (9)
- Giovanni Hidalgo – percussion (1, 11), quinto (1, 11), itolele (2), congas (9)
- Juan Nogueras Jr. – congas (1, 9), percussion (1, 11)
- Kenny Anderson – alto saxophone (2, 4), tenor saxophone (3)
- Ed Calle – baritone saxophone (2, 4, 7), tenor saxophone (2, 4, 7, 10), saxophone (3, 6), flute (6, 7), soprano saxophone (10)
- Dave Valentin – flute solo (6), flute (7)
- Dana Teboe – trombone (2–4, 6)
- Roger Ingram – trumpet (3, 4, 6)
- Cheito Quiñones – vocals (1, 7, 9, 11)
- Rita Quintero – vocals (1, 9, 11)
- Gloria Estefan – vocals (2)
- Vicki Carr – lead vocals (5)
- Willy Chirino – lead vocals (7)
- Peter Gonzalez – vocals (7, 9)

=== Production ===
- Dave Grusin – executive producer
- Larry Rosen – executive producer
- Carl Griffin – associate executive producer
- Arturo Sandoval – producer, arrangements
- Richard Eddy – producer, arrangements
- Mike Couzzi – engineer (1–4, 6–11)
- Will Tartak – engineer (5), assistant engineer
- Sebastian Krys – assistant engineer
- Joseph Doughney – post-production
- Michael Landy – post-production
- The Review Room (New York, NY) – post-production location
- Ted Jensen – mastering at Sterling Sound (New York, NY)
- Carl Valldejuli – production coordinator
- Hollis King – art direction
- Dan Serrano – art direction
- Leonel Matheu – artwork
- Alba Acevedo – graphic design
- Laura Goldman – graphic design
- Freddie Paloma – graphic design
- Carol Weinberg – photography
- Fernando Gonzalez – liner notes
