= Los Hombres Calientes, Vol. 1 =

1998 studio album by Mayfield & Summers

Los Hombres Calientes

Studio album by Irvin Mayfield & Bill Summers
- Released: June 30, 1998
- Recorded: March 1998
- Genre: Afro-Cuban jazz
- Label: Basin Street Records

Professional ratings
Review scores
Source	Rating
Allmusic	link

Los Hombres Calientes is the self-titled debut album by the New Orleans–based Afro-Cuban jazz group, co-led by trumpeter Irvin Mayfield and percussionist Bill Summers. Though no longer performing with the group, drummer Jason Marsalis of the Marsalis family appears on this album.

== Track listing ==
1. Victor el Rojo 6:44
2. El Barrio 3:56
3. Bill's Q Yvette 3:31
4. Stardust 5:27
5. Rhumba Para Jason 6:04
6. After You're Gone 3:00
7. Pulphus Final Frontier 4:31
8. Ye Ye O 5:01
9. Rompe Saraguey 6:07
10. Irvin's Crisis 5:01

== Personnel ==
- Irvin Mayfield – trumpeter, bandleader
- Bill Summers – percussionist, bandleader
- David Pulphus – bassist
- Yvette-Bostic Summers – percussionist, vocalist
- Jason Marsalis – drummer
- Victor Atkins III – pianist
