= José Rizo (DJ) =

Mexican jazz musician and disc jockey

- Born: April 27, 1956 (age 70); Guadalajara, Mexico
- Occupations: DJ, bandleader, teacher
- Years active: 1975–present

José Rizo (born April 27, 1956) is a disc jockey, born in Guadalajara, Mexico and grew up in Oxnard, California. He is a band leader, composer, music producer and host of Jazz on the Latin Side on radio station KKJZ. Rizo is a pioneer in programming Latin jazz on jazz radio. In 2011, his band Mongorama was nominated for a Grammy Award for Best Traditional Tropical Latin Album, for their self-titled album.

== History in radio ==
While a student at University of California, Santa Barbara, UCSB, Rizo began interviewing people on the air at KCSB-FM. In the late 1970s, he was a founder of Radio Chicano, a community and student broadcasting organization based at UC Santa Barbara. Rizo started on Santa Barbara commercial radio station KIST AM, doing a public affairs show called La Voz De La Raza that aired Sunday mornings from 1975 to 1976. He served as program director for two years. Rizo hosted a radio show called Barrio Salsoul from 1976 to 1982, on the UC Santa Barbara campus radio station, KCSB, and was the program director at KCSB in 1978.

At UCSB in the late 1970s he produced the yearly Cinco de Mayo concerts in the Storke Plaza, where he began working with such artists as Poncho Sanchez, Los Lobos, Tierra and Pete & Sheila Escovedo.

While a student at University of California, Santa Barbara, UCSB, Rizo began spinning music and interviewing people on Santa Barbara top-40 commercial radio station KIST AM, producing a public affairs show called La Voz De La Raza that aired Sunday mornings in 1975 to 1976. From 1976 to 1982, Rizo worked at the UCSB student radio station, KCSB FM, broadcasting the weekly radio show Barrio Salsoul, and serving as the radio station program director in 1978. Some of his earliest radio interviews included Cal Tjader, Los Lobos, Gato Barbieri, and Carlos Santana. Rizo was the founder of Radio Chicano, a community and student broadcasting organization based at KCSB (UC Santa Barbara) that produced daily Chicano/Latino programming.

Rizo was influenced early in his career by Chico Sesma, a pioneer Latin music disc jockey and bandleader, who became a friend and mentor. Sesma was the first to bring the mambo and cha cha cha to radio audiences in Los Angeles in the 50s and 60s. Another significant influence on Rizo's career was Chuck Niles, the only jazz disc jockey honored with a star on the Hollywood Walk of Fame.

Dedicated to bringing a more authentic approach to Latin jazz to radio, in 1990, Rizo approached public radio station KLON 88.1 about producing a regular program. After an audition, and a recommendation from Poncho Sanchez, the station invited him onto the airwaves, and his show Jazz on the Latin Side became a success, debuting on Sunday night, January 7, 1990. About a year later the show switched to Friday nights. Rizo served as program director for the station from 2007 until 2010.

The success of the radio show Jazz on the Latin Side led to a series of successful yearly productions like the KLON Latin Jazz Club Caravans and the KLON Cinco de Mayo Latin Jazz Dance Concerts. Rizo was also the founder of the KJazz High School Jazz Festival.

Besides the best in Latin jazz, Rizo had frequent live interviews with guests like Cachao, Kenny Burrell, Horace Silver, Mongo Santamaria, actor Andy Garcia, Eddie Palmieri, Poncho Sanchez, Gerald Wilson, Kareem Abdul-Jabbar, Hubert Laws, Al McKibbon, Willie Colon, and Marc Anthony.

In the mid-1990s he was invited to participate in Grammy Award committees and later, Latin Grammy Award committees.

Rizo has been an integral part of the yearly Central Avenue Jazz Festival since its inception in July 1996. Through the years he has served as artistic director alongside such jazz luminaries as Buddy Collette and Teddy Edwards. He has worked with Los Angeles jazz greats such as Gerald Wilson and Ernie Andrews. Rizo received the Jazz Journalists Association's 'A' Team Award for support of the Central Avenue Jazz Festival in 2007.

Rizo was co-founder and artistic director of the Luckman Fine Arts Latin Jazz Concert series (2000–2005), where he produced yearly Latin jazz concert events with such as Eddie Palmieri, Jerry Gonzalez and the Fort Apache Band, Poncho Sanchez, Dianne Reeves, Ozomatli, Tolu, Los Lobos, and Francisco Aguabella.

In 2004, Rizo and his wife Leticia started Saungu Records.

Rizo is the artistic producer of the L. A. Councilman Gilbert Cedillo's Latin Jazz and Music Festival, held for two days every August in Highland Park in the Los Angeles Area. He has also been a part of the yearly East L. A. Meets Napa wine tasting event produced by AltaMed at the Union Station in Los Angeles, since 2005.

By 2007, KLON's call letters had changed to KKJZ. Rizo became the station music director from 2007 to 2010. During this period, Jazz on the Latin Side aired on weekdays, Monday to Friday, Los Angeles drive-time, 5 to 7 pm. In 2010, the show went to Friday and Saturday nights until the start of 2015. Currently the show airs on Saturday nights, 6 to 10 pm.

== Jazz on the Latin Side All Stars ==
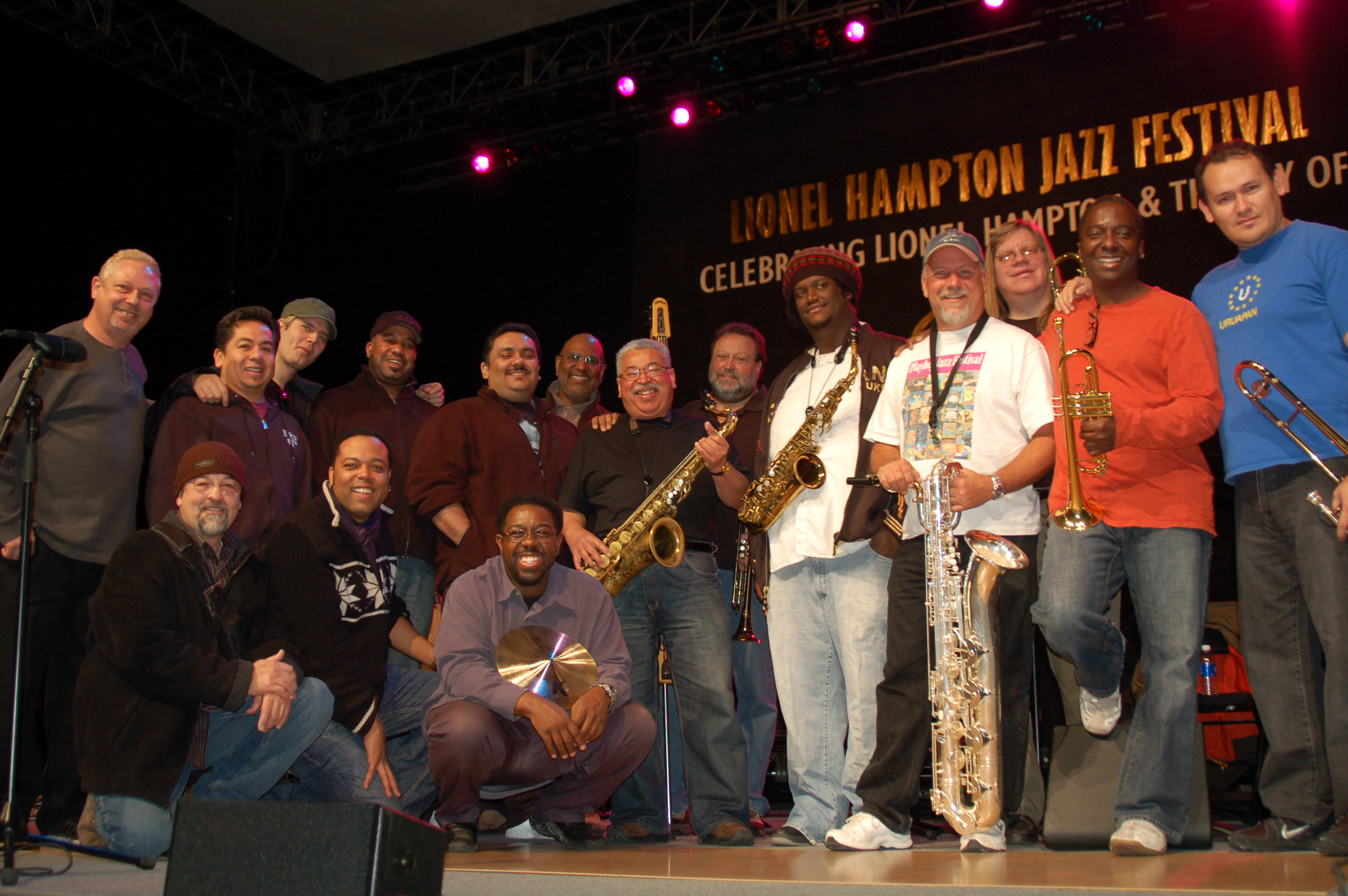
Jazz on the Latin Side All Stars at the Lionel Hampton International Jazz Festival

Jose Rizo is founder of Jazz on the Latin Side All Stars, a 16-piece all-star ensemble made up of world-class studio musicians and jazz artists and popular bandleaders. The all-star band was formed a few months after a big jam session in January 2002 at B.B. King's on the Universal City Walk, a celebration of ten years of Jazz on the Latin Side on KLON.

Through the years, members of the group have included Alex Acuna, Francisco Aguabella, Poncho Sanchez, Al McKibbon, Donald Vega, Oscar Hernandez, Joe Rotondi, Freddie Crespo and Adonis Puentes.

Current members are Justo Almario (tenor sax), Danilo Lozano (flute/music director), Marvin 'Smitty' Smith (drums), Francisco Torres (trombone), Rene Camacho (bass), Joey De Leon (congas), Alfredo Ortiz (bongo/guiro/vocals), Jimmy Branly (timbales), Kamasi Washington (alto sax), Scott Martin (baritone sax), Eric Jorgensen (trombone), Bijon Watson (trumpet), Gilbert Castellanos (trumpet), Andy Langham (piano), Jose Rizo (vocals) and James Zavaleta (lead vocals)

Discography

- Jazz on the Latin Side All Stars, Vol. 1 (Cubop Records, 2000)
- Jazz on the Latin Side All Stars, Vol. 2 (Cubop Records, 2001)
- The Last Bullfighter
- Tambolero

== Mongorama ==
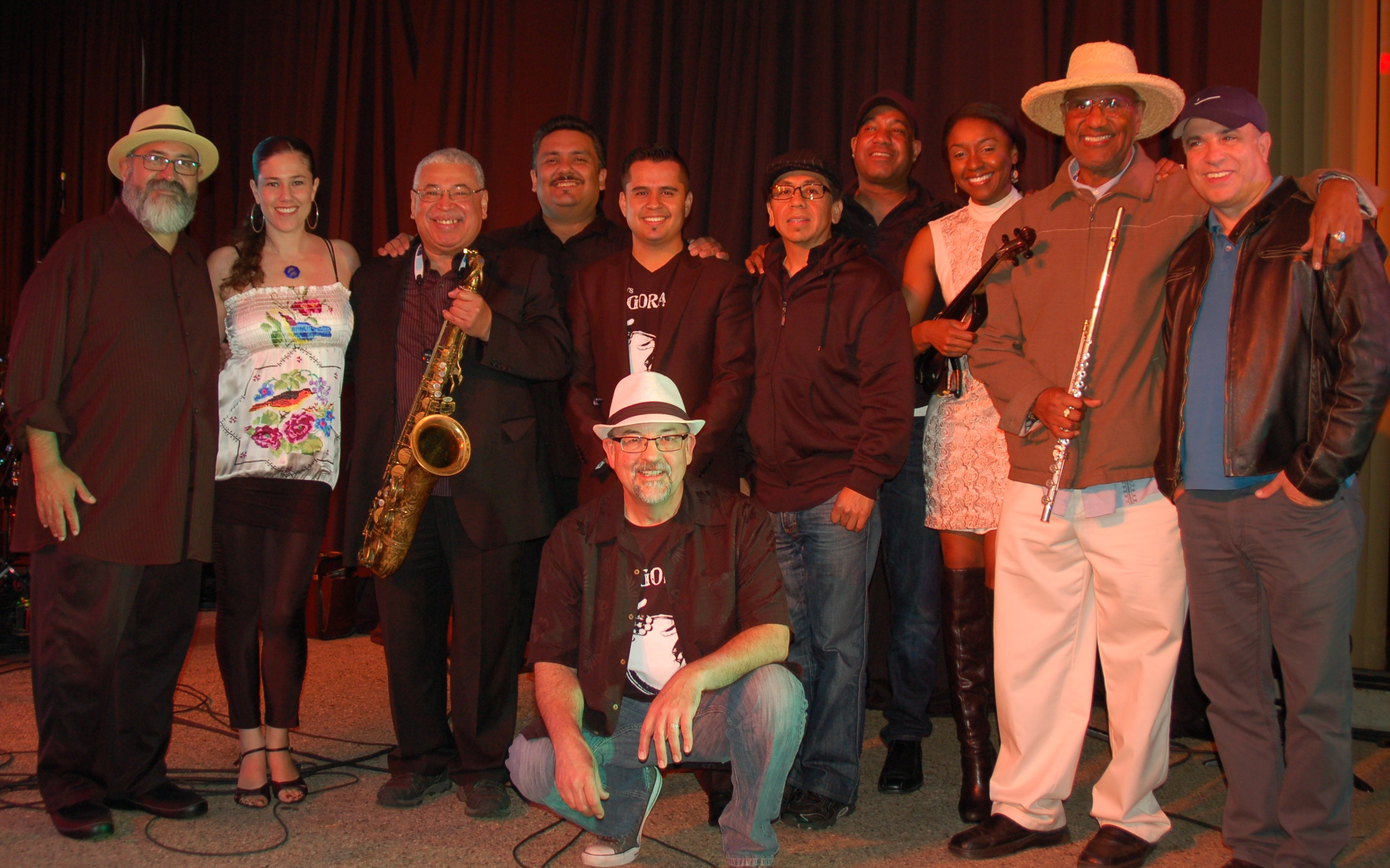
Mongorama

Rizo is the founder of the Afro-Cuban jazz band Mongorama. Its formation was inspired by an appreciation of jazz conguero Mongo Santamaria's 1960s musical exploration integrating Cuban charanga rhythms with jazz. The current Mongorama members are Justo Almario, Danilo Lozano, Ramon Banda, Dayren Santamaria, Rene Camacho, Joey De Leon, Alfredo Ortiz, James Zavaleta, Joe Rotondi and Jose Rizo. The first two Mongorama CDs also featured Destani Wolf, Adonis Puentes, Poncho Sanchez, Hubert Laws and Kenny Burrell.

In 2011, their debut self-titled album Mongorama was nominated for a Grammy in the category of Grammy Award for Best Traditional Tropical Latin Album.

Discography:

- Mongorama
- Baila Que Baila

== Professional affiliations ==
Rizo has been involved with the Central Avenue Jazz Festival since its inception. He has served as the artistic director, sharing those duties with Buddy Collette and Teddy Edwards. The festival focuses on showcasing Los Angeles-based jazz artists. In 2015 he was to serve as the master of ceremonies.

Rizo serves on review committees for the Latin Grammy Award.

Rizo served as the artistic director for the Luckman Fine Arts Latin Jazz concert series.
