= Ilya Serov =

American trumpeter and singer (born 1986)

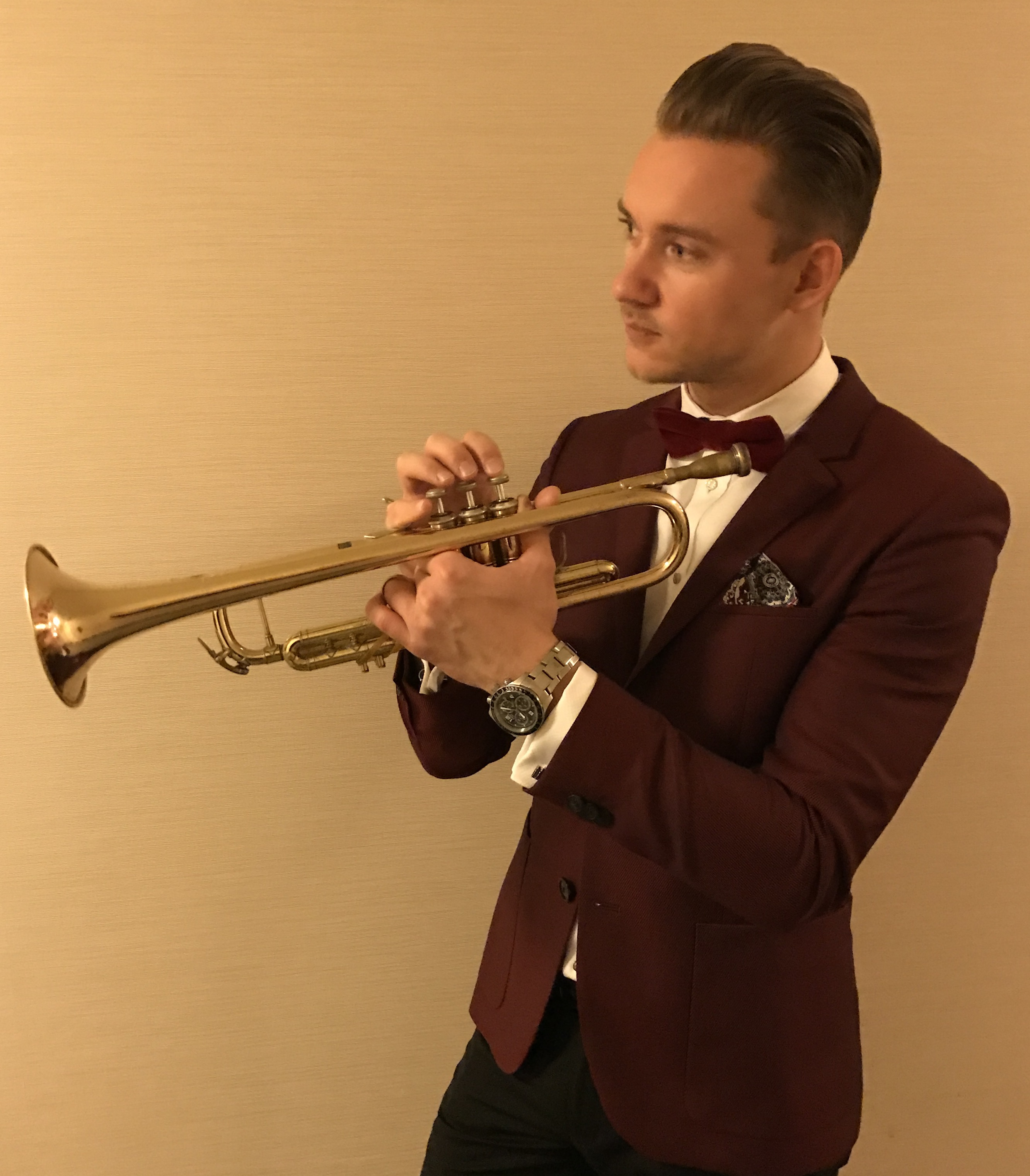

Background information
- Genres: Jazz
- Occupation: Musician
- Instruments: Trumpet, vocals and guitar
- Years active: 2012–present
- Label: Silky Sound Records
- Website: ilyaserov.com

Ilya Serov (born November 8, 1986) is an American trumpeter and singer.

Ilya Serov is a Los Angeles-based jazz trumpet player and singer. Serov released his first album, September In The Rain, in December 2013. Serov was named Best New Artist at the Hollywood International Entertainment Awards in 2014. Ilya Serov featured Roger Kellaway on an original rendition of Django Reinhardt's song "Swing 42" in 2017. On January 9, 2018, Ilya Serov released the single "Tangerine" that featured Grammy Award-winning Latin percussionist, Poncho Sanchez. Ilya Serov released his second album, Back In Time in September 2018 which featured Poncho Sanchez, Roger Kellaway, Bruce Forman and Eric Marienthal. In 2018, Serov performed on the Dave Koz and Friends at Sea Cruise, playing solo shows and appearing with musicians, such as Dave Koz, Michael Lington, Larry Graham and Jonathan Butler. Dave Koz invited Serov to rejoin the cruise in 2019 for ports in Australia.
