= Adonis Puentes =

Cuban-Canadian singer-songwriter (born 1974)

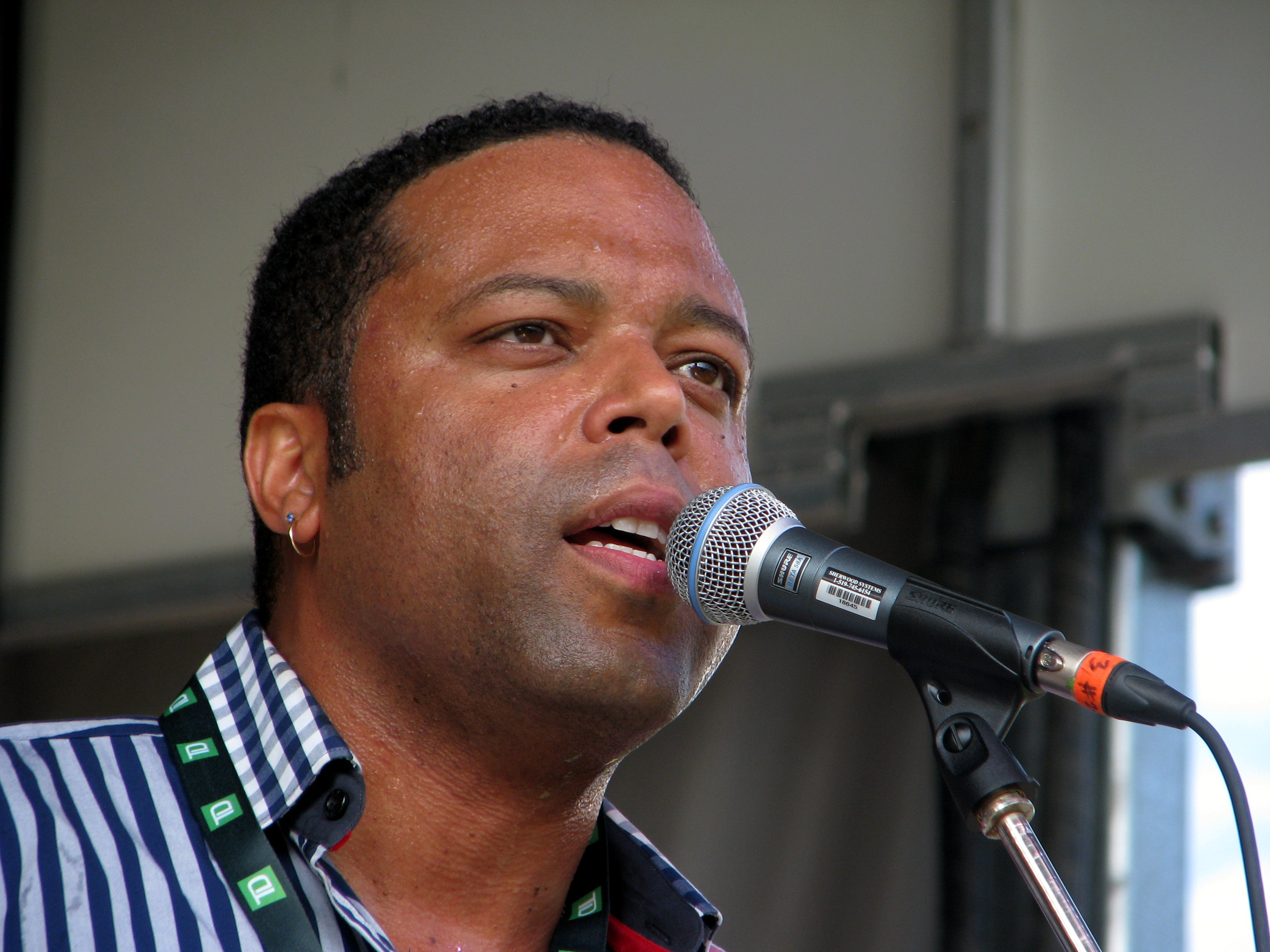
- Adonis Puentes, March 2015

Background information
- Born: 1974 (age 51–52)
- Origin: Artemisa, Cuba
- Genres: Son, Afro-Cuban jazz
- Occupation: Singer-songwriter

Adonis Puentes (born 1974) is a Cuban-Canadian singer-songwriter who sings in Spanish and English.

== Biography ==
Puentes was born in Artemisa, Cuba, the son of guitar player and music teacher Valentin Puentes and the twin brother of Alex Cuba. At the age of six, the brothers began performing in a children's guitar ensemble. As adults, they shifted into jazz fusion styles and formed their own band, Puentes Brothers. They both later emigrated to Canada after marrying Canadian women they met while touring in the country.

The Puentes Brothers garnered a Juno Award nomination for Best Global Album at the Juno Awards of 2001. They parted ways as a band to launch solo careers in 2004, but have continued to cowrite songs.

As a solo artist, Puentes fronts the Voice of Cuba Orchestra, was a guest musician in José Rizo's projects Mongorama and Jazz on the Latin Side All Stars, and has performed with Celia Cruz and Ruben Blades. At the Juno Awards of 2014, he was a shortlisted nominee for World Music Album of the Year for his album Sabor A Café.

== Albums ==
- Vida (2005)
- Sabor A Café (2013)
