= Higher Ground Hurricane Relief Benefit Concert =

Live album by Various artists
- Released: November 22, 2005
- Recorded: Frederick P. Rose Hall, September 17, 2005
- Genre: Jazz
- Labels: Blue Note Records, EMI Music Distribution
- Producers: Andre Kimo Stone Guess, Michael Cuscuna

Professional ratings
Review scores
Source	Rating
Entertainment Weekly	A− No. 851, p.99

Higher Ground Hurricane Relief Benefit Concert [LIVE] is an album with 77 minutes of highlights, from the roughly five-hour long concert with the same name that took place in the Rose Hall Theatre at Jazz at Lincoln Center on September 17, 2005.

All net profits from the sale of the CD will be donated to the Higher Ground Relief Fund established by Jazz at Lincoln Center and administered through the Baton Rouge Area Foundation to benefit the musicians, music industry related enterprises and other individuals and entities from the areas in Greater New Orleans who were impacted by Hurricane Katrina and to provide other general hurricane relief.

== Track listing ==
1. "This Joy" – 2:52 - Shirley Caesar
2. "Over There" – 7:31 - Terence Blanchard
3. "Go to the Mardi Gras" – 5:08 - Art Neville & Aaron Neville
4. "Basin Street Blues" – 5:52 - Diana Krall
5. "Never Die Young" – 4:06 - James Taylor
6. "The House I Live In" – 5:00 - Dianne Reeves
7. "New Orleans Blues" – 4:58 - Marcus Roberts
8. "I Think It's Going to Rain Today" – 3:04 - Norah Jones
9. "Dippermouth Blues" – 2:19 - Wynton Marsalis Hot Seven
10. "I'm Gonna Love You Anyway" – 4:50 - Buckwheat Zydeco
11. "Is That All There Is?" – 4:12 - Bette Midler & Lincoln Center Jazz Orchestra
12. "Just a Closer Walk With Thee" – 6:40 - Irvin Mayfield Jr.
13. "Here's to Life" – 6:21 - The Jordan Family
14. "Blackwell's Message" – 5:29 - Joe Lovano
15. "Come Sunday" – 9:28 - Cassandra Wilson & Lincoln Center Jazz Orchestra
