= Snug Harbor (jazz club) =

Jazz club in New Orleans, Louisiana

Coordinates: 29.9641°N 90.0579°W

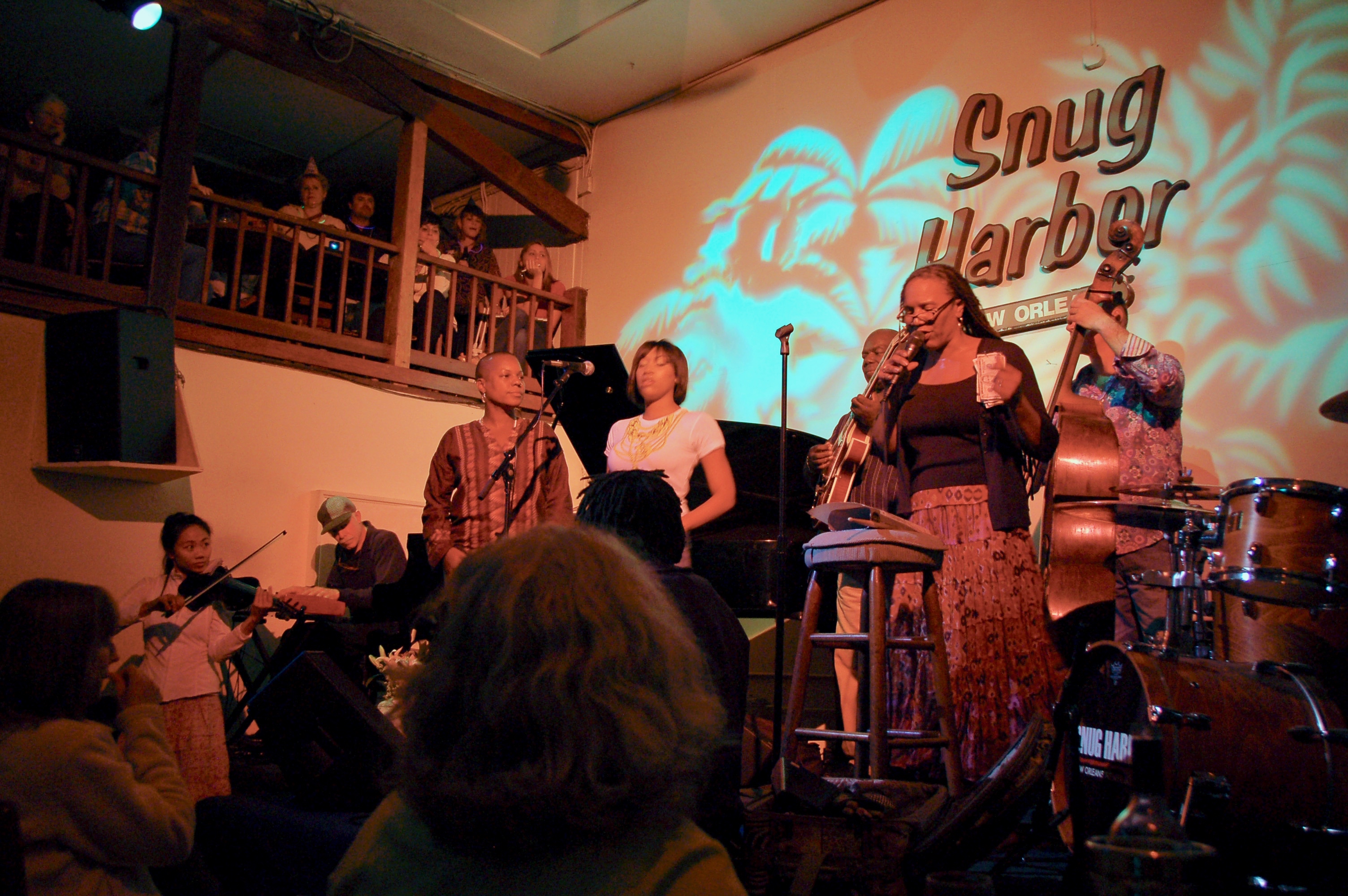
Charmaine Neville performing at Snug Harbor in 2008

Snug Harbor is a jazz club, bar, and restaurant on Frenchmen Street in the Faubourg Marigny section of New Orleans, Louisiana.

== Overview ==
It has been described as "the classiest jazz club in New Orleans" by The New York Times and as a "musical landmark" by Rolling Stone. It features live performances by both noted local and touring national jazz performers. Regulars include Charmaine Neville, Ellis Marsalis, and Irvin Mayfield.

The club was started by Glenn Menish in 1983 and later sold to George Brumat. Brumat owned the club until 2007, when he died of an apparent heart attack at the age of 63. Although the club was not flooded, Hurricane Katrina forced a temporary closing, which was noted as a significant blow to the jazz heritage of New Orleans. The club reopened October 14, 2005.

== See also ==
- List of jazz clubs
- List of music venues
