= Al Lewis (banjoist) =

American jazz banjoist

"Father" Al Lewis (1902 – April 12, 1992) was a jazz banjoist with some of the greatest New Orleans jazz bands in the Dixieland Jazz style of the music. He said he picked up his nickname trying to copy the piano solos of Earl "Fatha" Hines on the banjo. He is significant not only for his artistic abilities, but in his role as a preservationist of lost music.

In his youth, Lewis was a big, imposing performer with a joyous personality. He played by ear, as many in his day did, and worked from around 1918 in both New Orleans and on the riverboats that ferried passengers up and down the Mississippi and offered diversions like gambling and music to up-river audiences.

Lewis worked with band leader Joe "King" Oliver early in his career along with a string of New Orleans bands. As the Jazz Age moved to Chicago, the banjo became a dated sound in the American jazz scene outside of New Orleans, a relic of Plantation culture that "modern" musicians shed as the music integrated with white dance music into what became known as Big Band.

Banjo work declined, and by the 1950s Lewis had left New Orleans and was working for an insurance company in Memphis. He remained out of professional music until someone from the Preservation Hall in New Orleans recognized him on a tour date around 1979 or 1980 and an invitation was extended for him to come and play with the Hall, teach a new generation of musicians the music, and work with musicians who tapped his knowledge base to transcribe tunes that would be all but lost.

Lewis was a huge catalog of tunes from the early Dixieland years in New Orleans that were played and passed on by ear, and never written down. Dozens of tunes were recovered that otherwise might have been lost to the ages.

He loved to entertain as well as sing and play. In his later years, back in New Orleans, he appeared frequently both at Preservation Hall and on the streets of the French Quarter. He would surprise the crowd between numbers, handing out trinkets like balloons and key chains.

In his eighties he played with revival Dixieland Jazz bands from all over the world. He played with the Preservation Hall Jazz Band, Lars Edegran's New Orleans Jazz Band, the Maryland Jazz Band of Cologne and the New Orleans Joymakers, and could be found frequently on the streets of New Orleans. He recorded a self-entitled album "Father Al Lewis" an LP that was later converted for Compact Disc (CD).

He died on Sunday, April 12, 1992, at Lady of the Sea Hospital in Galliano, Louisiana, forty miles south of New Orleans. He was 87 years old. The cause of death was not made public.
