= Latin Soul (album) =

Live album by Poncho Sanchez
- Released: October 26, 1999
- Genre: Latin jazz
- Length: 68:04
- Label: Concord Jazz
- Producers: John Burk, Poncho Sanchez, David Torres

Latin Soul is a live album by Poncho Sanchez, released through Concord Jazz in 1999. In 2000, the album won Sanchez the Grammy Award for Best Latin Jazz Performance.

== Track listing ==
No.	Title	Writer(s)	Length
1.	"El Conguero"	George Balmaseda, Kenny Goldberg	6:10
2.	"Ven Pa Bailar"	Poncho Sanchez, David Torres	5:46
3.	"Ican"	Eddie Cano	7:45
4.	"Watermelon Man"	Herbie Hancock	6:13
5.	"Conga Blue"	Billy Mure	7:31
6.	"Lisa"	Willie Bobo	8:51
7.	"Bésame Mama"	Mongo Santamaría	6:55
8.	"Guaripumpe"	Traditional	8:54
9.	"Listen Here/Cold Duck Time"	Eddie Harris	5:42
10.	"Mama Guela"	Tito Rodriquez	7:23

== Personnel ==
- Production Development - Alexis Davis
- Linear Notes - Billy May
- Composer - Billy Mure
- Production Coordination - David Millar
- Arranger, Composer, Mixing, Piano, Producer - David Torres
- Composer - Eddie Cano
- Composer - Eddie Harris
- Linear Notes - Edward James Olmos
- Trombone - Francisco Torres
- Composer - George Balmaseda
- Executive Producer - Glen Barros
- Art Direction, Design, Photography - Greg Allen
- Composer - Herbie Hancock
- Associate Producer - Jim Cassell
- Mixing, Producer - John Burk
- Composer - Kenny Goldberg
- Baritone Saxophone - Mike Whitman
- Composer - Mongo Whitman
- Associate Producer - Nick Phillips
- Remote Recording Engineer - Phil Edwards
- Arranger, Composer, Congas, Mixing, Percussion, Primary Artist, Producer, Soloist, Timbales, Vocals - Poncho Sanchez
- Chekere, Timbales - Ramon Banda
- Mastering, Mixing, Mixing Engineer - Ron Davis
- Mixing Assistant - Ronnie Rivera
- Flugelhorn, Trumpet - Sal Cracchiolo
- Flute, Alto Saxophone, Baritone Saxophone, Tenor Saxophone - Scott Martin
- Composer - Tito Rodriguez
- Bass, Chekere, Vocals - Tony Banda
- Composer - Traditional
- Composer - William Bobo
