= Jason Marsalis =

American drummer (born 1977)

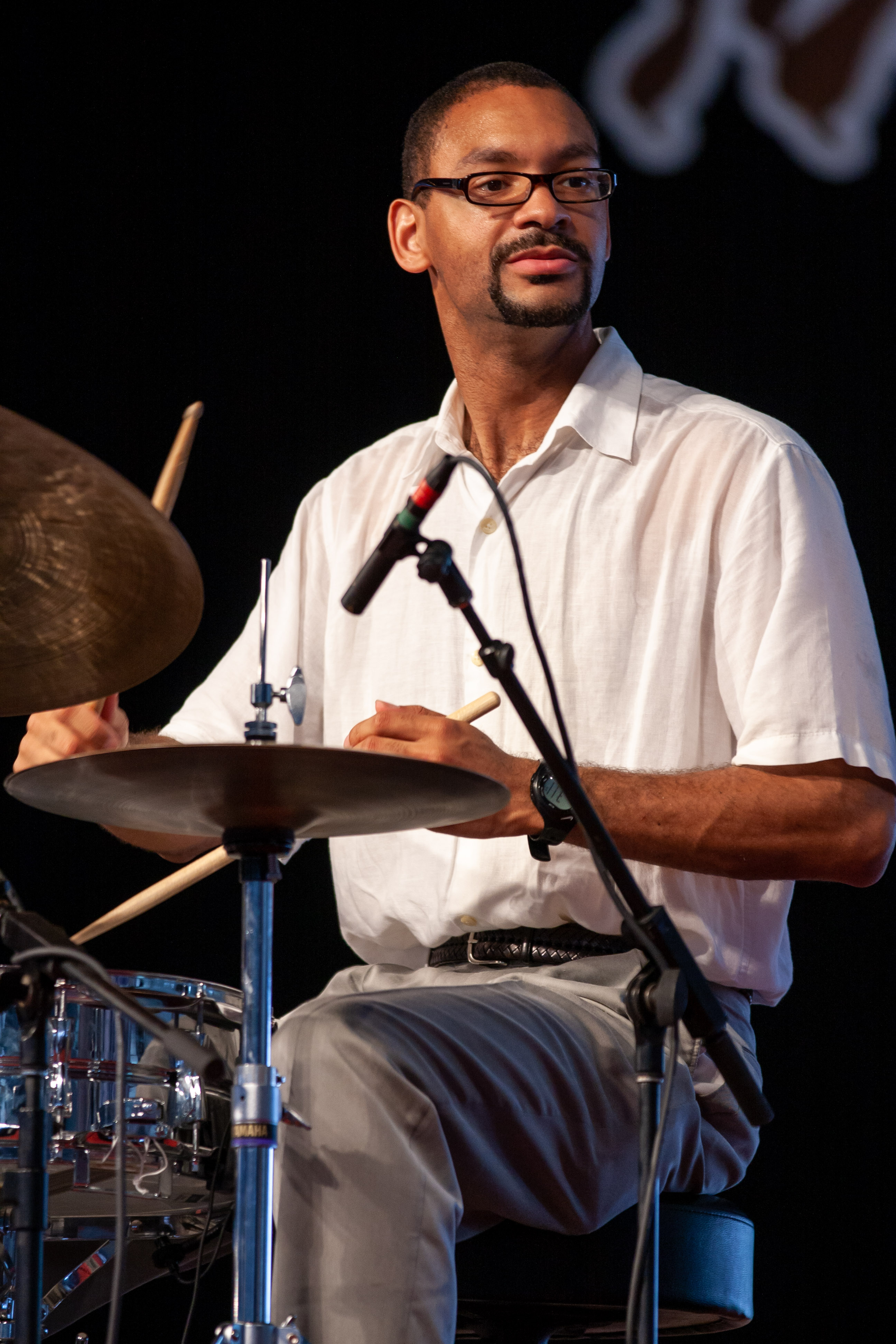
- Marsalis in 2010

Background information
- Born: March 4, 1977 (age 49); New Orleans, Louisiana, U.S.
- Genre: Jazz
- Occupation: Musician
- Instruments: Drums, vibraphone
- Years active: 1990-present
- Label: Basin Street
- Website: www.jasonmarsalis.com

Jason Ignatius Marsalis (born March 4, 1977) is an American jazz drummer, vibraphone player, composer, producer, band leader, and member of the Marsalis family of musicians. He is the youngest son of Dolores Ferdinand Marsalis and the late Ellis Marsalis, Jr., his brothers are Branford Marsalis, Wynton Marsalis and Delfeayo Marsalis.

== Early life ==
Marsalis was born in New Orleans, Louisiana, the son of Dolores (née Ferdinand) and Ellis Louis Marsalis, Jr., a pianist and music professor. His brothers are Branford Marsalis, Wynton Marsalis, Ellis Marsalis III (1964), Delfeayo Marsalis, and Mboya Kenyatta (1971). Branford, Wynton, and Delfeayo are also jazz musicians.

== Education ==
Marsalis graduated from the New Orleans Center for Creative Arts (NOCCA) and McMain Magnet Secondary School in 1995. In 1998, after his third year at Loyola University New Orleans where he was studying classical music and music performance, he left college to pursue his career as a musician.

During the COVID-19 pandemic, Marsalis re-enrolled in Loyola to complete his degree because "with venues shuttered and tours canceled" "he had the time and opportunity to return to his studies."

Thirty-one years after his initial enrollment at Loyola, Marsalis graduated from the College of Music and Media in May 2026.

== Musical career ==
At age 6, Marsalis took lessons from legendary New Orleans drummer James Black. As a teenager, he made his recording debut on Delfeayo Marsalis's 1992 release, Pontius Pilate’s Decision.

Marsalis worked as a sideman in mainstream jazz, funk, and jazz fusion groups (Neslort and Snarky Puppy); a Brazilian percussion ensemble (Casa Samba); and played Celtic music with Beth Patterson. He introduced percussionist Bill Summers to trumpeter Irvin Mayfield, and they founded Los Hombres Calientes. Marsalis has also played with John Ellis, Dr. Michael White, and the Marsalis family. Marsalis regularly performs at the New Orleans Jazz & Heritage Festival as leader and sideman.

Marsalis has had a long professional career and collaboration with pianist Marcus Roberts. In 1994 at the age of 17 he toured as a member of the Marcus Roberts Trio performing selections from Roberts' Gershwin for Lovers. In 2022 he continues performing with Marcus Roberts as a member of the trio and Robert's Modern Jazz Generation. In a program of Duke Ellington songs at Carnegie Hall with Marcus Roberts, bassist Rodney Jordan, vocalist Catherine Russell, and the American Symphony Orchestra, critic Seth Colter Walls writes "The drumming by Marsalis was likewise individual in character, particularly during "Three Black Kings." (At one point, he made a simple-sounding pattern progressively complex in its syncopations, until he stirred the crowd to applause.)"

At the age of 21, Marsalis released his first record as leader, The Year of the Drummer. "On this impressive debut, his quintet puts together a highly coordinated spin on blues motifs and Caribbean figures. The music is vivacious as it makes its move; all sorts of fresh ideas concerning tempo fill the air."

Los Angeles Times’ writer Don Heckman reviewed Marsalis's second record, the 2000 release, Music in Motion, and described it as "impressive," "the opportunity to display his technique in everything from brushwork and hard-driving jazz to offbeat meters and Brazilian rhythms...with ease," and "purposeful, intelligent drumming." The record's cover photograph is of Jason standing on the tracks of the New Orleans Public Belt Railroad along Leake Avenue in New Orleans.

In 2009, Marsalis released his first album as a leader on vibraphone, entitled Music Update. The album received 4.5 out of 5 stars in DownBeat magazine. Writing in The New York Times, critic Ben Ratliff said that Marsalis was "an excellent musician trying out something risky without embarrassment."

In 2013, Marsalis released his second vibraphone record, In a World of Mallets, as the Jason Marsalis Vibes Quartet. The quartet consisted of Austin Johnson (piano), Will Goble (bass), and Dave Potter (drums), and each contributed one song to the record and most of the other songs were composed by Marsalis. Marsalis plays marimba, glockenspiel, tubular bells, vibraphone, and xylophone. The record peaked at #1 in JazzWeek's chart. In a review by Britt Robson in JazzTimes -- "In a World of Mallets highlights the growth of Jason Marsalis as a full-fledged vibraphonist" and "..captures the guileless mischief and playful impulsiveness of Marsalis’ personality, and inspires him into a spirited yet still multifaceted performance." In the liner notes Marsalis writes "a debt of gratitude is owed to the original members of the percussion ensemble M'Boom". He dedicates one of his songs, Blues Can Be Abstract, Too, to "all musicians and music students who believe that blues is a primitive old form in which no modern music can be explored."

Drummers Marsalis, Herlin Riley, and Shannon Powell play together as The New Orleans Groovemasters. During a 2020 performance at the Ellis Marsalis Center for Music in New Orleans, Marsalis's father Ellis Louis Marsalis, Jr. sat in on three songs with the Groovemasters. Herlin Riley commented about the performance in International Musician, "Ellis Marsalis passed away on April 1st [2020] from the coronavirus. In hindsight, that March 3 [2020] performance was a special moment at the close of his life and career. He played with his longtime friend (Germaine Bazzle), his youngest son, and in the venue that bears his name and was built in his honor."

The Jason Marsalis Signature Series Vibe Mallets are the first mallets Marimba One designed specifically for the vibraphone. Marsalis is a Marimba One artist and plays the One Vibe.

== Film ==
On June 29, 2003 Seiji Ozawa conducted the Berlin Philharmonic with the Marcus Roberts Trio at the Waldbühne in Berlin. They performed the music of George Gershwin and one piece each by Marcus Roberts and Paul Lincke. EuroArts released the concert on Blu-Ray and DVD in 2021 as Ozawa: A Gershwin Night - Waldbühne Berlin. The video includes a 19-minute documentary, They got Rhythm, about the origin of the performance and includes footage of rehearsals and interviews of Marsalis, Seiji Ozawa, Marcus Roberts, and bassist Roland Guerin.

Marsalis is one of the artists featured in Tradition is a Temple: The Modern Masters of New Orleans, a 2013 documentary film about New Orleans.

In 2022 Music Pictures: New Orleans had its world premiere at the Tribeca Film Festival, and after the premiere Marsalis performed for the attendees. The documentary is about elder and master musicians of New Orleans, and Marsalis's father, Ellis Marsalis, Jr. is featured. The documentary includes footage of Marsalis and his father recording and footage of one of his father's last live performances at Snug Harbor Jazz Bistro where Marsalis was headlining.

One of the stories in the 2023 Grammy award-winning film Jazz Fest: A New Orleans Story features Ellis Marsalis playing with his sons Jason, Branford, Wynton, and Delfeayo in the Jazz Test at the 2019 New Orleans Jazz & Heritage Festival. At the time, Ellis was 84 years old. This might have been the last time the Marsalis family musicians played together publicly. Ellis died less than one year later. All five Marsalis musicians were interviewed and told vignettes about Jazz Fest including Jason recalling meeting Miles Davis at eight years old.

== Personal life ==
Marsalis was raised Catholic.

== Awards and honors ==
=== National Endowment for the Arts ===
Marsalis and his brothers Branford, Wynton, Delfeayo, and their father Ellis were named NEA Jazz Masters in 2011.

=== OffBeat's Best of The Beat Awards ===
Year	Category	Work nominated	Result	Ref.
1999	Best Drummer		Won	
2013	Best Contemporary Jazz Album	In a World of Mallets	Won	
2018	Best Contemporary Jazz Band or Performer		Won	
2023	Best Other Instrumentalist (for vibraphone)		Won	

== Selected discography ==
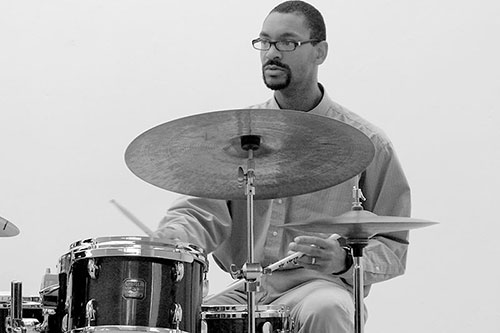
Jason Marsalis, Aarhus, Denmark (2009)

=== As leader ===
- Music for Meditation and Relaxation, Vol. 2 (self-released, 2023)
- Music for Meditation and Relaxation, Vol. 1 (self-released, 2022)
- Jason Marsalis Live (Basin Street, 2020)
- Jason Marsalis & The 21st Century Trad Band - Melody Reimagined:book 1 (Basin Street, 2017)
- Heirs Of The Crescent City (ELM Records, 2016)
- Jason Marsalis Vibes Quartet - The 21st Century Trad Band (Basin Street, 2014)
- Jason Marsalis Vibes Quartet - In a World of Mallets (Basin Street, 2013)
- Music Update (ELM Records, 2009)
- Music in Motion (Basin Street, 2000)
- The Year of the Drummer (Basin Street, 1998)

=== As co-leader ===
- Los Hombres Calientes – Vol. 2 (Basin Street, 2000)
- Los Hombres Calientes – Los Hombres Calientes (Basin Street, 1998)

=== As sideman ===
- John Ellis & Double Wide - Fireball (Sunnyside Records, 2026)
- Trumpet Mafia - Tell Me (self-released single, 2025)
- Funkwrench Blues - Mischief in the Musitorium (Need to Know Music, 2025), featured on track 6, Funk-ish
- Trumpet Mafia - Dippy ft. Nicholas Payton, Wendell Brunious, Leroy Jones (self-released single, 2024)
- Mahmoud Chouki - Caravan -- From Marrakech to New Orleans (New Orleans Jazz Museum/Gallatin Street Records, 2024), featured on track 2, Angelica
- John Ellis Quartet - Bizet: Carmen in Jazz (Blue Room Music, 2023)
- Judith Owen – Winter Wonderland (Holiday Edition) (Twanky Records, 2023)
- Christian Fabian Trio – Hip To The Skip (feat. Jason Marsalis & Matt King) (Spice Rack Records, 2023)
- Andy Page Quartet - Mobius (self-released, 2023)
- Patrick S. Noonan – Beat Nouveau (Wild Orchard Record Company, 2022)
- Outer Park – Blood from an Orange (Wild Orchard Record Company, 2022)
- Judith Owen – Come On and Get It (Twanky Records, 2022), vibraphone on track 9
- Daniel Hope - America (Deutsche Grammophon, 2022), drummer on tracks 1–5, Gershwin Song Suite with Marcus Roberts Trio
- Outer Park – Whole Lotta Orange (Wild Orchard Record Company, 2021)
- Ellis Marsalis with Jason Marsalis - For All We Know, (part of The New Orleans Collection, Newvelle Records, 2020)
- Masakowski Family - Have Yourself a Merry Little Christmas (self-released, 2020)
- John Ellis - All Things Bright (2020)
- Jazz at Lincoln Center Orchestra featuring Wynton Marsalis - A Swingin’ Sesame Street Celebration (Blue Engine Records, 2020), substitute orchestra member
- Lionel Hampton Big Band featuring Jason Marsalis - Live at Rossmoor (ALFi Records, 2019)
- Outer Park – 1968 (slight return) (Wild Orchard Record Company, 2019)
- Norbert Susemihl's Joyful Gumbo – Featuring Chloe Feoranzo & Jason Marsalis (Sumi Records, 2018)
- Live at Little Gem Saloon : Basin Street Records celebrates 20 years (Basin Street Records, 2018)
- Kermit Ruffins & Irvin Mayfield – A Beautiful Celebration (Basin Street Records, 2017), featured on track 4
- Dr. Gianni Bianchini - Type 1 (2017 self-released) drums on tracks 1,2,4,5,6,9 &10
- Jon Batiste - Christmas with Jon Batiste (Naht Jona, 2016), drummer on track 4
- Fredrik Kronkvist - Monk Vibes (Connective Records, 2015)
- Ellis Marsalis Trio - On the Second Occasion (ELM Records, 2014)
- The Native Jazz Quartet - Stories (self-released, 2013)
- Ellis Marsalis Trio - On the First Occasion (ELM Records, 2013)
- New Orleans Brass Revue - A tribute to Hoagy (Boqueria Records, 2013)
- Bela Fleck and the Marcus Roberts Trio - Across the Imaginary Divide (Rounder, 2012)
- Norbert Susemihl – Night on Frenchmen Street (Sumi Records, 2012)
- Ellis Marsalis - A New Orleans Christmas Carol (ELM Records, 2011)
- John Ellis & Double-Wide - Puppet Mischief (2010)
- The Marsalis Family – Music Redeems (Marsalis Music, 2010), whistle, vibraphone, drums on tracks 2, 4, 6, 9, 11, 12
- Scan-Am Quartet - Atlantic Bridges (Connective Records, 2010)
- Stephen Riley – El Gaucho (SteepleChase, 2010)
- Oran Etkin Wake Up Clarinet! (Timbalooloo, 2010)
- Tim Laughlin - A Royal St Serenade (Gentilly Records, 2009)
- Norbert Susemihl's New Orleans All Stars – Live at Maribo Jazzfestival-Denmark (Sumi Records, 2008)
- Ellis Marsalis Quartet - An open letter to Thelonious (ELM Records, 2008)
- Neal Caine – Backstabber's Ball (Smalls Records, 2006)
- Jonathan Batiste - Times in New Orleans (self-released, 2005)
- Troy Andrews Quintet - The end of the beginning (Treme Records, 2005)
- Branford Marsalis - Romare Bearden Revealed (Marsalis Music, 2003)
- The Marsalis Family – A Jazz Celebration (Marsalis/Rounder, 2003)
- Tim Laughlin - The Ilse of Orleans (Gentilly Records, 2003) - 3 tracks
- John Ellis (saxophonist) – Roots, Branches & Leaves (Fresh Sound, 2002)
- Ellis Marsalis - May your Christmas be bright: jazz at Christmas in New Orleans (ELM Records, 2002)
- Marcus Roberts Trio – Cole After Midnight (Columbia, 2001), tracks 2 to 8, 10 to 13, 15
- Roland Guerin – You Don't Have to See It to Believe It (Half Note, 2000)
- David Morgan Trio – Live at the Blue Note (Half Note, 1999)
- Marcus Roberts Trio – In Honor of Duke (Columbia, 1999)
- The Ellis Marsalis Trio – Twelve's It (Columbia, 1998)
- Marcus Roberts – Blues for the New Millennium (Columbia, 1997), tracks 1, 3, 4, 7, 8, 10 to 13
- Karen Walwyn – Dark Fires (20th Century Music For Piano) (Albany Records, 1997)
- Marcus Roberts – Time and Circumstance (Columbia, 1996)
- Harold Battiste – Harold Battiste presents Next Generation (AFO, 1996), tracks 1, 5, 7, 9
- Ellis Marsalis – Whistle Stop (Columbia, 1994), drummer on tracks 4 and 7
