= Nat Perrilliat =

American jazz musician

Nathaniel Leonard "Nat" Perrilliat (November 29, 1936 – January 26, 1971) was an American jazz, blues, and R&B saxophonist.

He was born in New Orleans. Perilliat learned to play alto, tenor, and baritone saxophones in his youth, as well as piano, and worked as a house saxophonist for New Orleans's Caffin Theater. He played with Professor Longhair from 1952, as well as with Smiley Lewis and Shirley & Lee. He also began working in jazz idioms, with Ellis Marsalis, Alvin Batiste, James N. Black, Nat Adderley, and Ed Blackwell. In the later 1950s and 1960s he continued working as a session musician for New Orleans recordings, including for Allen Toussaint, Fats Domino, Barbara George, and Clarence "Frogman" Henry. He assembled a big band of New Orleans jazz musicians in 1962 and also toured with Domino, Junior Parker, and Joe Tex later in the decade. However, he did not make enough money to remain a full-time musician, and supported his family by working as a taxi driver.

He died of a cerebral hemorrhage at age 35 in Sacramento, California.
