= Freedom Sound (Poncho Sanchez album) =

Studio album by Poncho Sanchez
- Released: 1997
- Recorded: March 3–5, 1997
- Genre: Jazz
- Length: 58:45
- Label: Concord Picante

Professional ratings
Review scores
Source	Rating
AllMusic	3/5 stars

Freedom Sound is an album by Poncho Sanchez, released in 1997. The trombonist Wayne Henderson and the saxophonist Wilton Felder, both of the Jazz Crusaders, appear on the album.

== Critical reception ==
The Washington Post thought that "Sanchez's percussion-heavy band applies leisurely, syncopated arrangements to such Jazz Crusader chestnuts as 'Scratch', 'MJ's Funk', 'Latin Bit' and 'Aleluia', both with and without the special guests." The Philadelphia Daily News called the album "a careful mix of Latin jazz, salsa, standard ballads and old Jazz Crusader tunes tweaked with Latin rhythms."

AllMusic wrote that "the title track leans toward a 6/8 jazz feeling, and 'MJ's Funk' is a more or less straight-ahead blues, both butting horns with Sanchez's domineering congas."

== Track listing ==
1. "Brown & Blue" – 4:53
2. "Transdance" – 5:26
3. "Aleluia" – 5:27
4. "Freedom Sound" – 6:27
5. "You Don't Know What Love Is" – 6:20
6. "Prestame Tu Corazon" – 5:24
7. "MJ's Funk" – 2:52
8. "(Baila El) Suave Cha" – 3:40
9. "When We Were One" – 8:12
10. "Latin Bit" – 4:15
11. "Scratch" – 5:49

== Personnel ==
- Poncho Sanchez – Arranger, Conga, Vocals, Mixing
- Ramon Banda – Drums, Timbales
- Tony Banda – Bass (Electric), Bass (Acoustic)
- Sal Cracchiolo – Trumpet, Flugelhorn
- Wilton Felder – Sax (Tenor)
- Alex Henderson – Trombone, Didjeridu
- Wayne Henderson – Trombone
- Scott Martin – Flute, Sax (Alto), Sax (Baritone), Sax (Tenor)
- José Papo Rodríguez – Percussion, Bongos, Conga
- David Torres – Piano, Arranger, Mixing

== Production ==
- Chris Bellman – Mastering
- John Burk – Producer
- Jim Cassell – Associate Producer
- Jordan d'Alessio – Assistant Engineer
- Mike Hoaglin – Production Manager
- Bernie Kirsh – Engineer, Mixing
- Robert Reed – Assistant Engineer
- Larry Sanchez – Equipment Technician
