= Poncho Sanchez =

Poncho Sánchez
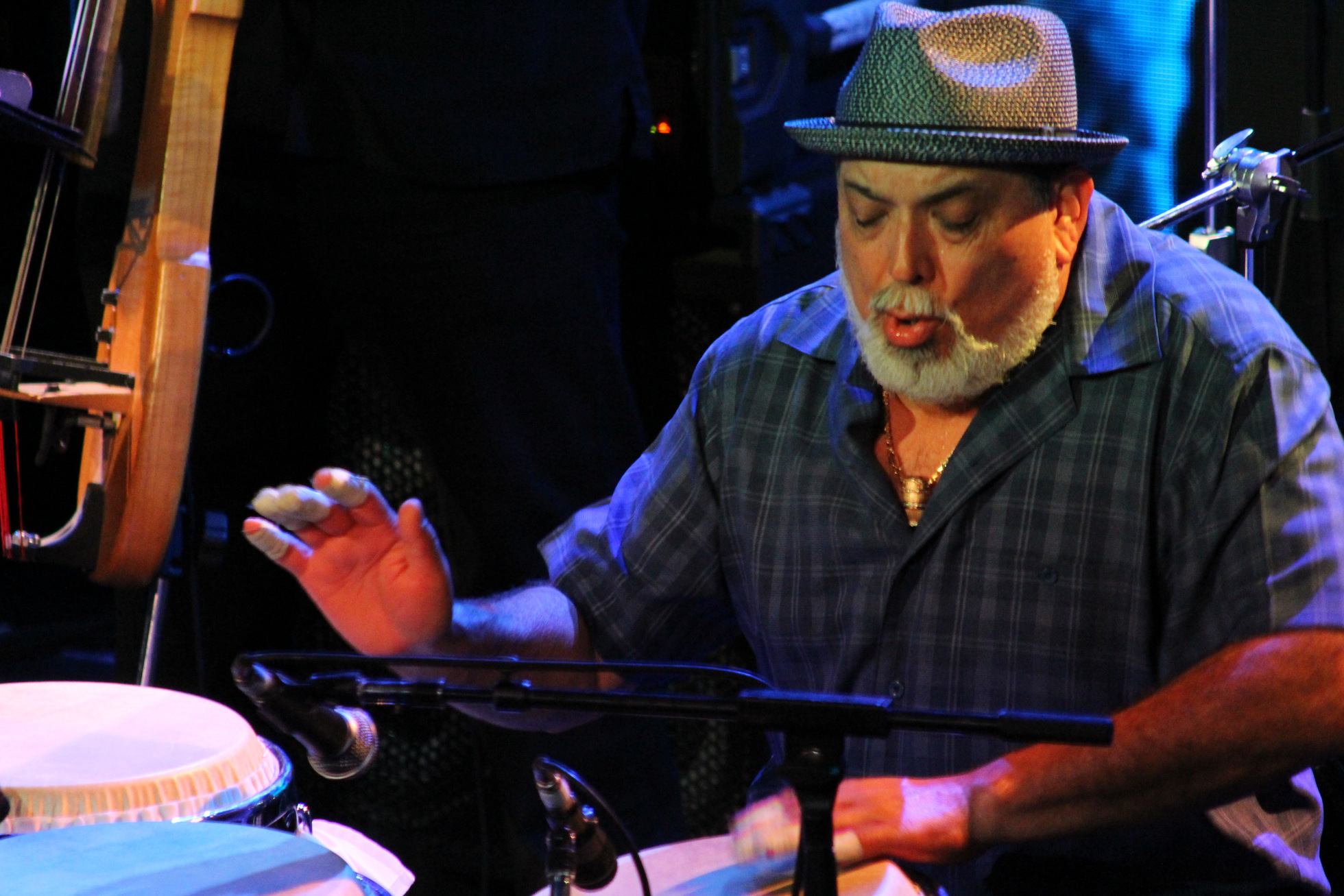
- Poncho Sanchez performing in 2014

Background information
- Born: Ildephonso Sanchez; October 30, 1951 (age 74); Laredo, Texas, U.S.
- Genres: Jazz; Latin; Latin jazz
- Occupations: Musician; arranger; composer; record producer
- Instruments: Conga; vocals; timbales; percussion
- Years active: 1975–present
- Labels: Concord Records; Universal

Poncho Sánchez (born Ildefonso Sanchez, October 30, 1951) is an American conguero (conga player), Latin jazz band leader, and salsa singer. In 2000, he and his ensemble won the Grammy Award for Best Latin Jazz Album for their work on the Concord Picante album Latin Soul. Sanchez has performed with artists including Cal Tjader, Mongo Santamaría, Hugh Masekela, Clare Fischer, and Tower of Power.

== Early life ==
The youngest of eleven children, Poncho Sanchez was born in Laredo, Texas and reared in Norwalk, California, while he attended Cerritos College. Growing up, he was exposed to and influenced by two different styles of music: Afro-Cuban music (mambo, son, cha-cha, rumba, guaracha, and Changui) by Tito Puente and others, and bebop jazz, including the works of Dizzy Gillespie and Charlie Parker.

Originally a guitarist, he discovered his talent for singing during an audition for the R&B band The Halos that rehearsed across the street from his residence. Sanchez became the lead vocalist of The Halos, and would go on to teach himself the flute, the drums, and timbales before finally deciding in high school to pursue conga drumming above all.

Sanchez has released dozens of LPs and CD albums.

== Career ==
In 1975, Sanchez's idol, vibraphonist Cal Tjader, invited him to perform a set with his band. Seeing the young man's talent, Tjader hired Sanchez for a week before officially making him a full member of the ensemble. Sanchez played a crucial role as conguero for several years until Tjader's death in 1982.

Before he died, Tjader suggested that Concord Records founder Carl Jefferson sign Sanchez and his soon-to-be-formed group under the Concord Picante label. Tjader's wishes were honored, and the first two records were composed and arranged by long-time Tjader collaborator Clare Fischer. Sanchez went on to produce 19 albums for the label, eventually garnering a Grammy for his work.

AllMusic described Sanchez as "among the most influential percussionists in jazz." He has been performing frequently in venues varying in size from concert halls to local jazz festivals. His 2005 CD, Do It!, features the funk band Tower of Power on two tracks, as well as South African trumpeter Hugh Masekela.

Sanchez is a frequent collaborator with bandleader José Rizo. He played conga on the Grammy-nominated album Mongorama produced by Rizo.

Sanchez was featured on Ilya Serov's single "Tangerine", released on January 9, 2018.

== Discography ==
- Poncho (Discovery DS 799, 1979)
- Straight Ahead (Discovery DS 813, 1980)
- Salsa Picante [by Clare Fischer] (Discovery DS 817, 1980)
- Machaca [by Clare Fischer & Salsa Picante] (Discovery DS 835, 1981]
- 2+2 [with Clare Fischer & Salsa Picante] (Pausa PR 7086, 1981)
- Sonando (Concord Picante, 1983)
- Bien Sabroso (Concord Picante, 1984)
- El Conguero (Concord Picante, 1985)
- Gaviota (Discovery DSCD 930, 1980 [rel. 1986]) with Clare Fischer
- Papa Gato (Concord Picante, 1987)
- ¡Fuerte! (Concord Picante, 1988)
- La Familia (Concord Picante, 1989)
- Chile Con Soul (Concord Picante, 1990) with Tito Puente
- Cambios (Concord Picante, 1991) with Freddie Hubbard
- A Night at Kimball's East (Concord Picante, 1991)
- El Mejor (Concord Picante, 1992)
- Bailar: A Night With Poncho Sanchez Live (Concord Picante, 1990 [rel. 1993])
- Para Todos (Concord Picante, 1994)
- Soul Sauce: Memories Of Cal Tjader (Concord Picante, 1995)
- Baila Mi Gente: Salsa! (Concord Picante, 1996) compilation
- Conga Blue (Concord Picante, 1996)
- Freedom Sound (Concord Picante, 1997) with Wilton Felder, Wayne Henderson
- Poncho Sanchez: The Concord Jazz Heritage Series (Concord Jazz, 1998) compilation
- Afro-Cuban Fantasy (Concord Picante, 1998) with Dianne Reeves
- Latin Soul (Concord Picante, 1999)
- Soul of the Conga (Concord Picante, 2000)
- Latin Spirits (Concord Picante, 2001) with Dale Spalding
- Ultimate Latin Dance Party (Concord Picante, 2002) 2-CD compilation
- Out of Sight! (Concord Picante, 2003) with Ray Charles
- Poncho at Montreux [live] (Silverline/Immergent, 2004)
- Instant Party (Concord Picante, 2004) compilation
- Do It! (Concord Picante, 2005) with Hugh Masekela, Tower Of Power
- Raise Your Hand (Concord Picante, 2007)
- Psychedelic Blues (Concord Picante, 2009)
- Chano y Dizzy! (Concord Picante, 2011) with Terence Blanchard
- Live in Hollywood (Concord Picante, 2012)
- Trane's Delight (Concord Picante, 2019)
- Live at the Belly Up Tavern (PS Productions, 2023 [rel. 2025])

With Benny Golson

- Killer Joe (Columbia, 1977)

With Woody Herman

- Woody's Gold Star (Concord, 1987)

With Art Pepper

- Tokyo Debut [live] (Galaxy, 1977 [rel. 1995])

With Cal Tjader

- Grace Cathedral Concert (Fantasy, 1976)
- Guarabe (Fantasy, 1977)
- Here [live] (Galaxy, 1977 [rel. 1979])
- Cuban Fantasy [live] (Fantasy, 1977 [rel. 2003])
- Huracán (Crystal Clear, 1978; reissue: Laserlight, 1990)
- La Onda Va Bien (Concord Picante, 1979)
- Gózame! Pero Ya (Concord Picante, 1980)
- A Fuego Vivo (Concord Picante, 1981)
- Heat Wave (Concord Jazz, 1982) with Carmen McRae
- Good Vibes (Concord Picante, 1981 [rel. 1984])
- Live at the Monterey Jazz Festival 1958–1980 (Concord Jazz, 2008)

With Ilya Serov

- Back In Time (featuring Poncho on "Tangerine") (Silky Sound, 2018)

With José Rizo's Mongorama

Mongorama (Saungú Records, 2011)

Baila Que Baila (Saungú Records, 2013)
