= Los Hombres Calientes =

American jazz group

Los Hombres Calientes was a New Orleans–based jazz group. They are most associated with Latin jazz, especially Afro-Cuban jazz, and contemporary jazz. Their 1998 self-titled debut was praised by the New Orleans Times-Picayune. Bill Summers, Irvin Mayfield and Jason Marsalis were among the founding members.

== Discography ==
- Los Hombres Calientes (1998)
- Los Hombres Calientes Volume 2 (1999)
- Los Hombres Calientes Volume 3: New Congo Square (2000)
- Los Hombres Calientes Volume 4: Vodou Dance (2003)
- Los Hombres Calientes Volume 5: Carnival (2005)
