= Basin Street Records =

American record label

- Founded: 1997
- Founder: Tom Thompson; Mark Samuels
- Genre: Jazz, funk, blues
- Country of origin: U.S.
- Location: New Orleans, Louisiana
- Official website: basinstreetrecords.com

Basin Street Records is a Grammy Award-winning independent record label based in New Orleans which specializes in jazz, funk, and rhythm and blues (R&B).

Basin Street Records was founded in 1997 by Mark Samuels and Tom Thompson. The label arose out of an agreement to release a live album for New Orleans jazz trumpeter and vocalist Kermit Ruffins, who was managed by Thompson. In mid-1998 Samuels bought Thompson's interest in the company. In 2005, Hurricane Katrina flooded the Basin Street Records office and Mark Samuels' home. Samuels continued to operate the company from "computers in coffee shops" while rebuilding his home and office in New Orleans.

Basin Street concentrates on jazz, funk, rhythm and blues, and blues. The roster includes Kermit Ruffins, Los Hombres Calientes, Jason Marsalis, Irvin Mayfield, Michael White, The Headhunters, Henry Butler, Jon Cleary, Theresa Andersson, Jeremy Davenport, Rebirth Brass Band, and Davell Crawford.

== Awards ==
- Best Latin Jazz Album, Los Hombres Calientes, Billboard Latin Music Awards (1998)
- Best Record Label, OffBeat magazine, 2000, 2002–2005, 2009, 2012–2015
- Music Business of the Year, OffBeat magazine, 2003, 2004, 2013
- Grammy Award for Best Regional Roots Music Album, Rebirth of New Orleans, Rebirth Brass Band (2012)
