= James N. Black =

American jazz musician

James Norbert Black (February 1, 1940 – August 30, 1988) was an American jazz drummer associated with the New Orleans jazz scene who was born in New Orleans.

Black played piano and trumpet during his youth, and studied music at Southern University in Baton Rouge. As a drummer, he first started working in R&B ensembles in the late 1950s, but took a job drumming with Ellis Marsalis in New Orleans's Playboy Club, leading to further work in jazz idioms. He moved to New York City in the mid-1960s and worked in jazz idioms in that decade with Nat Perrilliat, Roy Montrell, Ellis Marsalis, Nat Adderley and Cannonball Adderley, Joe Jones, Horace Silver, Lionel Hampton, Yusef Lateef, Freddie Hubbard, and Eric Gale. He moved back to New Orleans near the end of the 1960s, playing there with Dr. John, James Booker, Fats Domino, Professor Longhair, Charles Neville, James Rivers, Earl Turbinton and the Dukes of Dixieland. He was a session musician for Scram Records, and can be heard e.g. on Eddie Bo's single "Hook and Sling". In the 1980s he worked with Cassandra Wilson, Wynton Marsalis, and Germaine Bazzle.

Black also composed; among his works are the tunes "Monkey Puzzle" and "Dee Wee", both of which were recorded by Ellis Marsalis's ensemble in the early 1960s. As a composer, Black received two grants from the National Endowment for the Arts. Recordings under his name were compiled by Night Train Records and released on CD as I Need Altitude: Rare and Unreleased New Orleans Jazz and Funk, 1968-1978.
