= Irvin Mayfield =

American jazz musician, composer and bandleader (born 1977)

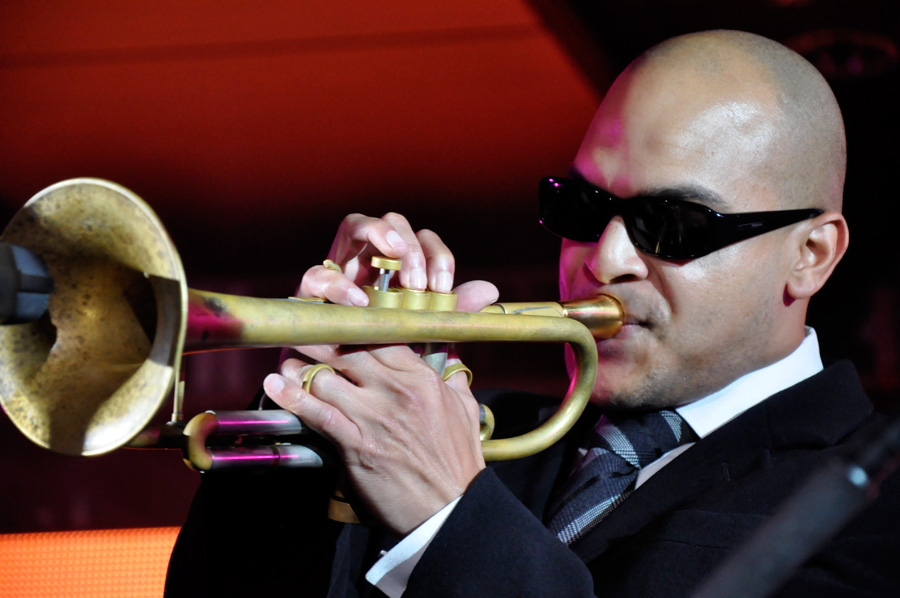
- Mayfield in 2013

Background information
- Born: December 23, 1977 (age 47); New Orleans, Louisiana, U.S.
- Genres: Jazz, Afro-Cuban jazz, modern jazz
- Occupation(s): Musician, composer, educator
- Instrument: Trumpet
- Years active: 1990s–present
- Labels: Basin Street, Half Note

Irvin Mayfield Jr. (born December 23, 1977) is an American trumpeter, composer, bandleader and educator. On November 3, 2021, Mayfield was sentenced to 18 months in prison for defrauding the New Orleans public library system for over one million dollars.

== Early life ==
Irvin Mayfield, who was born in New Orleans, Louisiana, United States, is the youngest of nine children from Joyce Alsanders and Irvin Mayfield Sr. His mother was a schoolteacher in New Orleans' Upper Ninth Ward. His father was a drill sergeant in the United States Army and a boxer who died in the flood after Hurricane Katrina. Growing up, Mayfield Jr. played organ at his church and received his first trumpet when he was in the fourth grade.

== Career ==
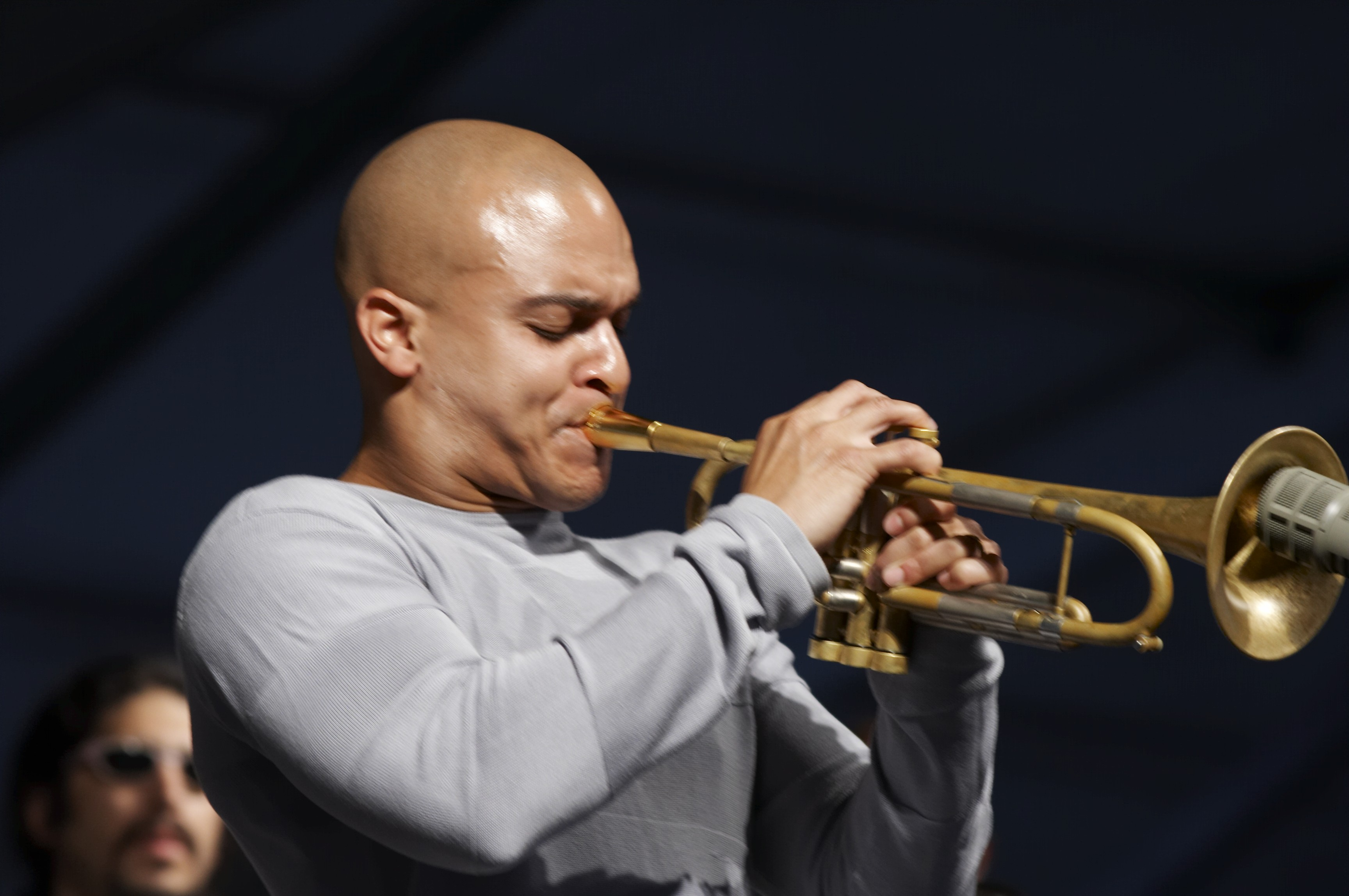
Mayfield in 2006

Mayfield started his musical career in the late 1980s with the Algiers Brass Band, a traditional New Orleans–based street act. He graduated from the New Orleans Center for Creative Arts (NOCCA), and was offered a scholarship to the Juilliard School of Music, but he decided to attend the University of New Orleans instead. At the University of New Orleans he dropped out during his first semester.

In 1998, Mayfield helped found Los Hombres Calientes, a New Orleans jazz group that incorporates Afro-Cuban jazz with rhythm & blues. Original members include Mayfield, Bill Summers, and Jason Marsalis. Shortly after forming, the band signed with Basin Street Records, a record label in New Orleans and published five albums over the years.

In 2002, Mayfield founded the New Orleans Jazz Orchestra, a sixteen-piece jazz ensemble as a nonprofit organization dedicated to perform and promote New Orleans Jazz. In 2016, he stepped down as artistic director. Mayfield has performed at Carnegie Hall, Sydney Jazz Festival Australia, North Sea Jazzfestival Europe, and New Orleans Jazz & Heritage Festival. In 2004 Mayfield composed Strange Fruit, a 90-minute opus based on Billie Holiday's recording "Strange Fruit" in 1939. The music combines jazz elements with negro spirituals and classical music. The work is reminiscent of Wynton Marsalis's Blood on the Fields and All Rise, and the storyline features a doomed interracial romance in 1920s Louisiana. The composition was supported by Dillard University. Mayfield appears in performance footage in the 2005 documentary film Make It Funky!, which presents a history of New Orleans music and its influence on rhythm and blues, rock and roll, funk and jazz. In the film, he performs "Skokiaan" as part of a trumpet challenge with Kermit Ruffins and Troy Andrews.

In 2005, he joined Wynton Marsalis at the Higher Ground Hurricane Relief Benefit Concert in the aftermath of Hurricane Katrina. In 2006, Mayfield performed at the White House in Washington, D.C. Mayfield was nominated to the National Council on the Arts by President George W. Bush and was appointed to the post by President Barack Obama in 2010. In 2009, Mayfield founded the Poorman Mayfield Music Group record label which released the Amanda Shaw album, Good Southern Girl, in 2010. The label closed in 2014. He and the New Orleans Jazz Orchestra opened The People's Health New Orleans Jazz Market in 2015. The New Orleans Jazz Market is a performing arts venue and Jazz community center in Central City New Orleans. The Jazz Market features music education experiences for all ages and hosts a New Orleans Jazz Archive.

== New Orleans Library scandal ==
Mayfield was implicated in account records investigated by the United States Attorney's office, involving the New Orleans Library Foundation and a payment to the New Orleans Jazz Orchestra. In May 2015, Mayfield was accused of scandal involving unethical use of non-profit funds. The scandal first erupted when WWL-TV, a CBS affiliate, revealed that Mayfield and Ronald Markham rewrote the bylaws of the Library Foundation board, so they could divert funds to New Orleans Jazz Orchestra, which was also led by Mayfield and Markham. WWL further revealed that Mayfield spent $18,000 of foundation money on a five-night trip to New York in 2012. As president of the Library Foundation, and with Markham on its board, Mayfield steered more than $1 million of library donations toward the $10 million cost of constructing the Peoples Health New Orleans Jazz Market and other projects. Mayfield and Markham resigned from the Library Foundation shortly after this was reported. In May 2016, Mayfield and the New Orleans Jazz Orchestra reached an agreement to pay $483,000 of that money back to the Library Foundation over a period of five years, and NOJO also pledged to raise the rest of the $1.1 million through benefit concerts. In July 2016, Mayfield resigned as artistic director of the New Orleans Jazz Orchestra. On April 13, 2017, WWLTV reported that FBI and the Inspector General's office are seeking information from the New Orleans Library Foundation, as it continues its investigation into jazz musician Mayfield.

Mayfield was indicted on December 14, 2017, by a federal grand jury on 19 counts including fraud, conspiracy and money laundering. The indictment also named Ronald Markham as co-defendant. The indictment alleged that he and Markham steered nearly $1.4 million from the New Orleans Public Library Foundation's Board to the New Orleans Jazz Orchestra or to enriched themselves between 2011 and 2013, while serving in leadership roles on both organization's boards. Among other things, the indictment alleges Mayfield spent the money on a 24-karat gold-plated trumpet. Mayfield is also alleged to have spent thousands in donations on travel expenses the library foundation said were not connected with library business, including tens of thousands on hotel expenses in New York. The indictments against Mayfield and Markham includes four counts of wire fraud, 11 counts of money laundering and one count of obstruction of justice.

In October 2018, the State of Louisiana released an audit covering 2009 to 2016 of the New Orleans Jazz Market and New Orleans Jazz Orchestra financial and organization records, that concluded that funds provided by the State of Louisiana and City of New Orleans may have been misappropriated and therefore could be in violation of state law.

On November 3, 2021, Mayfield was sentenced to 18 months in prison for "egregious fraud" of "ripping off the public libraries". He was released in January 2023.

== Awards and honors ==
- Grammy Award for Best Large Jazz Ensemble Album, Book One, New Orleans Jazz Orchestra, 2009
- Appointed Cultural Ambassador of the City of New Orleans, 2003
- Contemporary Latin Jazz Album of the Year, Los Hombres Calientes, Billboard, 2000

== Discography ==
- Irvin Mayfield (Basin Street, 1998)
- Live at the Blue Note with Jaz Sawyer (Half Note, 1999)
- How Passion Falls (Basin Street, 2001)
- Half Past Autumn Suite with Gordon Parks (Basin Street, 2003)
- Strange Fruit with the New Orleans Jazz Orchestra (Basin Street, 2005)
- Love Songs, Ballads, and Standards with Ellis Marsalis (Basin Street, 2008)
- Book One, with the New Orleans Jazz Orchestra (World Village, 2009)
- A Love Letter to New Orleans (Basin Street, 2011)
- A New Orleans Creole Christmas (Basin Street, 2014)
- New Orleans Jazz Playhouse (Basin Street, 2015) 7-CD set with 290 page coffee-table sized book
- Dee Dee's Feathers with Dee Dee Bridgewater, New Orleans Jazz Orchestra (Okeh, 2015)
- A Beautiful World with Kermit Ruffins (Basin Street, 2017)
- Live at Newport with the New Orleans Jazz Orchestra (Basin Street, 2017)
