= Ellis Marsalis Jr. =

American jazz pianist and educator (1934–2020)

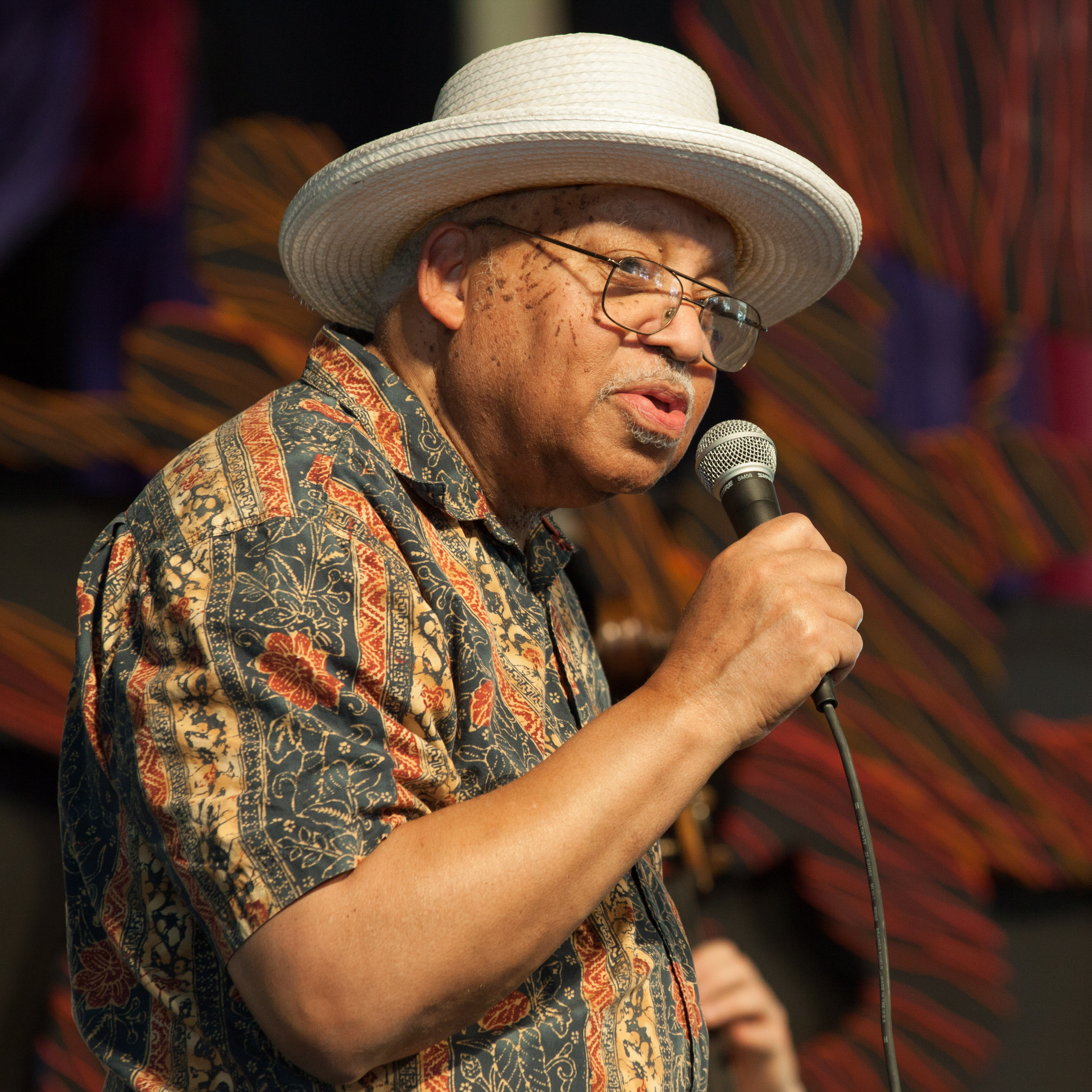
- Marsalis addresses the crowd during his performance at Jazz Fest, May 3, 2014

Background information
- Born: Ellis Louis Marsalis Jr. November 14, 1934; New Orleans, Louisiana, U.S.
- Died: April 1, 2020 (aged 85) New Orleans, Louisiana, U.S.
- Education: Dillard University
- Genres: Jazz, classical
- Occupations: Musician, educator
- Instrument: Piano
- Years active: 1949–2020
- Labels: Elm, Blue Note, Columbia, Sony, AFO Records
- Website: ellismarsalis.com
- Children: 6, including: Branford; Wynton; Delfeayo; Jason
- Father: Ellis Marsalis Sr.

Ellis Louis Marsalis Jr. (November 14, 1934 – April 1, 2020) was an American jazz pianist and educator. Active since the late 1940s, Marsalis came to greater attention in the 1980s and 1990s as the patriarch of the Marsalis musical family, when sons Branford and Wynton became popular jazz musicians.

== Early life ==
Born in New Orleans, Louisiana, Marsalis was the son of Florence Marie (née Robertson) and Ellis Marsalis Sr., a businessman and social activist. Marsalis and his wife Dolores Ferdinand Marsalis had six sons: Branford, Wynton, Ellis III, Delfeayo, Mboya, and Jason. Branford, Wynton, Delfeayo, and Jason also became jazz musicians. Ellis III is a poet and photographer.

Marsalis played tenor saxophone and piano during high school, and performed locally with a rhythm and blues band that included pianist Roger Dickerson. After high school, Marsalis served a year in the Marine Corps where he performed on piano for the majority of his duty. He subsequently attended Dillard University, where he graduated in 1955 with a degree in music education. While attending Dillard, he worked as the high school band director at what was then Xavier University Preparatory School on Magazine Street, where he witnessed the classical playing of one of the students, piano prodigy James Booker. Marsalis later attended graduate school at Loyola University New Orleans.

In the 1950s and 1960s, he worked with Ed Blackwell, Cannonball Adderley, Nat Adderley, and Al Hirt. During the 1970s, Marsalis taught at the New Orleans Center for Creative Arts. His students have included Lauren Bernofsky, Terence Blanchard, Harry Connick Jr., Donald Harrison, Kent Jordan, Marlon Jordan, and Nicholas Payton.

== Musical career ==
Marsalis recorded nearly twenty of his own albums and was featured on many discs with such musicians as David "Fathead" Newman, Eddie Harris, Marcus Roberts, and Courtney Pine. As a teacher, he encouraged his students to learn from history while also making discoveries in music on their own. "We don't teach jazz, we teach students," he once said about his ability to teach jazz improvisation. As a leading educator at the New Orleans Center for Creative Arts, the University of New Orleans (UNO), and Xavier University of Louisiana, Marsalis influenced the careers of countless musicians, as well as his four musician sons: Wynton, Branford, Delfeayo and Jason. Marsalis retired from UNO in 2001. In May 2007, Marsalis received an honorary doctorate from Tulane University for his contributions to jazz and musical education.

== Death ==
On April 1, 2020, Marsalis died at the age of 85 from pneumonia brought on by COVID-19. Municipal pandemic safety measures precluded a traditional jazz funeral procession. The short documentary film titled Death Is Our Business by Frontline briefly covered the situation when investigating the pandemic's effects on the New Orleans funeral industry.

== Personal life ==
Marsalis and his wife, Dolores, were Catholic and raised all their children in the faith. The youngest of his sons is Mboya Kenyatta Marsalis, who is diagnosed with autism and has been cared for by his brother Delfeayo since their father's death. Their mother, Dolores, died in 2017.

== Discography ==
=== As leader/co-leader ===
- 1985: Syndrome (ELM, 1985)
- 1985: Homecoming with Eddie Harris (Spindletop, 1985)
- 1986: Piano in E (Rounder, 1991)
- 1989: A Night at Snug Harbor, New Orleans (Somethin' Else, 1990)
- 1990: Ellis Marsalis Trio (Blue Note, 1991)
- 1991: Heart of Gold (Columbia, 1992)
- 1993: Whistle Stop (Columbia, 1994)
- 1994: Joe Cool's Blues with Wynton Marsalis (Columbia, 1995)
- 1995: Loved Ones with Branford Marsalis (Sony Music, 1996)
- 1998?: Twelve's It (Columbia, 1998)
- 1998: On the First Occasion (ELM, 2013)
- 1999: Duke in Blue (Columbia, 1999)
- 2000: Afternoon Session (Music in the Vines, 2001)
- 2005?: Ruminations in New York (ESP Disk, 2005)
- 2007: An Open Letter to Thelonious (ELM, 2008)
- 2011?: A New Orleans Christmas Carol (ELM, 2011)
- 2012: Pure Pleasure for the Piano with Makoto Ozone (Verve, 2012)
- 2017: Live at Jazzfest 2017 (Munck Music, 2017)
- 2017?: The Ellis Marsalis Quintet Plays the Music of Ellis Marsalis (ELM, 2017)

=== As sideman or guest ===
With American Jazz Quintet

- 1987: From Bad to Badder
- 1996: In the Beginning

With Branford Marsalis

- 1986: Royal Garden Blues
- 2003: Romare Bearden Revealed

With Delfeayo Marsalis

- 1997: Musashi
- 2014: The Last Southern Gentlemen

With Wynton Marsalis

- 1981: Wynton Marsalis
- 1982: Fathers and Sons
- 1986: J Mood
- 1990: Standard Time, Vol. 3: The Resolution of Romance

With Marsalis family

- 2002: Marsalis Family: A Jazz Celebration
- 2010: Music Redeems

With Irvin Mayfield

- 1998: Irvin Mayfield
- 2001: How Passion Falls
- 2008: Love Songs, Ballads, and Standards
- 2011: A Love Letter to New Orleans

With Kermit Ruffins

- 1992: World on a String
- 1996: Hold on Tight

With Dave Young

- 1996: Two by Two Vol. 2

With others

- 1958: Boogie Live ...1958, Ed Blackwell
- 1962: In the Bag, Nat Adderley
- 1984: Friends, Steve Masakowski
- 1987: King Midas & the Golden Touch, Michael Caine
- 1989: Have You Heard?, Rich Matteson
- 1990: Return to the Wide Open Spaces, David "Fathead" Newman with Cornell Dupree
- 1990: Solos (1940), Art Tatum
- 1991: As Serenity Approaches, Marcus Roberts
- 1992: 25, Harry Connick Jr.
- 1996: In the Sweet Bye and Bye, Preservation Hall Jazz Band
- 1996: Next Generation, Harold Battiste
- 1996: Suite Memories, Gerald Wilson
- 1996: Ways of Warmdaddy, Wessell Anderson
- 2006: Marsalis Music Honors Series: Jimmy Cobb, Jimmy Cobb
- 2006: The Sonet Blues Story: 1977, Snooks Eaglin
- 2008: Jazz for Peanuts, David Benoit
- 2008: Simply Grand, Irma Thomas
- 2009: Say It Plain, Scotty Barnhart
- 2015: A Very Swingin' Basie Christmas!, Count Basie Orchestra

== Awards and honors ==
Marsalis was inducted into the Louisiana Music Hall of Fame in 2008. The Ellis Marsalis Center for Music at Musicians' Village in New Orleans is named in his honor. In 2010, The Marsalis family released a live album titled Music Redeems, which was recorded at The John F. Kennedy Center for the Performing Arts in Washington, D.C., as part of the Duke Ellington Jazz Festival. All proceeds from the sale of the album go directly to the Ellis Marsalis Center for Music.

Marsalis and his sons were group recipients of the 2011 NEA Jazz Masters Award.

Marsalis was a fraternity brother of Phi Beta Sigma and Phi Mu Alpha Sinfonia. In 2015, Marsalis was named Phi Mu Alpha Sinfonia's 24th Man of Music, their highest honor given to a member, for advancing the cause of music in America through performance, composition or any other musical activity. In 2018, Marsalis was awarded an honorary doctorate of music from Berklee College of Music during its 50th annual High School Jazz Festival.

In 2021, the city of New Orleans renamed Palmer Park to Marsalis Harmony Park. The park is in the Leonidas area, close to Pigeon Town where Marsalis grew up.

Marsalis received a Grammy Trustees Award posthumously in 2023, accepted in his absence by his son Jason and granddaughter Marley.

== See also ==
- Deaths in 2020
- List of deaths from the COVID-19 pandemic
