= Creation (Branford Marsalis album) =

Studio album by Branford Marsalis / Orpheus Chamber Orchestra
- Released: March 2001
- Recorded: March 2000
- Genre: Classical music
- Length: 1:08:36
- Label: Sony Classical
- Producer: Thomas Mowrey

Branford Marsalis / Orpheus Chamber Orchestra chronology
Contemporary Jazz (2000)	Creation (2001)	Footsteps of Our Fathers (2002)

Professional ratings
Review scores
Source	Rating
Allmusic	4.5/5 stars

Creation is a classical music album by Branford Marsalis with the Orpheus Chamber Orchestra, focused on 20th century French classical music. It includes well-known pieces newly arranged for saxophone and orchestra, as well as compositions specifically written for saxophone and orchestra by Darius Milhaud and Jacques Ibert. The album was recorded March 9 – 11, 2000 at the American Academy of Arts and Letters in New York City.

Creation is Marsalis's second classical album, after the 1986 album Romances for Saxophone.

== Reception ==
The album reached number 2 on the Billboard Top Classical Albums chart.

In his AllMusic review, Richard S. Ginell calls the album a "winner, sumptuously recorded and proof that good things can come from those who wait." He specifically calls out the rendition of Darius Milhaud's La Creation du Monde for praise, calling the performance "well-paced, very polished and urbane, yet sufficiently raucous -- if not ideally swinging -- in the jazzy stretches." Tim Smith, writing for The Baltimore Sun, calls the performance "sometimes sexy" and "thoroughly winning." In PopMatters, Ben Varkentine says the album is "a beautiful and rewarding work, perhaps nowhere more so than on Darius Milhaud's Scaramouche, a suite for Saxophone and Orchestra." Hilarie Grey, writing in JazzTimes, says the recording contains "intimate, sacred moments to vivid cinematic vistas" and calls the artists "a powerful and absorbing combination."

== Track listing ==
No.	Title	Length
1.	"Gymnopedie" (Erik Satie)	2:24
2.	"'The Little Shepherd' from Children's Corner" (Claude Debussy)	2:27
3.	"Pavane pour une infante defunte" (Maurice Ravel)	6:28
4.	"La création du monde, Op. 81" (Darius Milhaud)	17:24
5.	"'Pie Jesu' from Requiem" (Gabriel Faure)	3:34
6.	"Sorocaba (Sarabandes do Brasil No 1), Op 67" (Darius Milhaud)	1:34

Scaramouche, Suite for Saxophone and Orchestra, Op. 165c, Darius Milhaud
No.	Title	Length
7.	"I. Vif"	3:14
8.	"II. Modere"	5:31
9.	"Brazileira"	2:35

No.	Title	Length
10.	"Corcovado' (Saudades do Brasil No. 7), Op. 67" (Darius Milhaud)	2:01
11.	"Sumare' (Saudades do Brasil No. 9), Op. 67" (Darius Milhaud)	1:54

Concertino da camera for Alto Saxophone and Orchestra, Jacques Ibert
No.	Title	Length
12.	"I. Allegro con moto"	4:29
13.	"II. Larghetto"	4:29
14.	"III. Animato molto"	6:19

No.	Title	Length
15.	"Laranjeiras' (Saudades do Brasil No. 11) Op. 67" (Darius Milhaud)	1:01
16.	"'Golliwogg's Cake-Walk' from Children's Corner Suite" (Claude Debussy)	3:05
