= Marsalis Music Honors Bob French =

Studio album by Bob French
- Released: (United States) April 10, 2007 (Canada) April 24, 2007 (United Kingdom) May 7, 2007
- Recorded: June 15–16, 2006
- Studios: Avatar (New York, New York)
- Genre: Jazz
- Length: 76 minutes
- Label: Marsalis Music/Rounder Records
- Producer: Branford Marsalis

In 2007, Marsalis Music Honors Bob French was released as part of the Marsalis music Honors series. The album's musicians include Harry Connick, Jr. on piano and Branford Marsalis on saxophone.

== Track listing ==
1. "Bourbon Street Parade" (Paul Barbarin) - 8:20
2. "Basin Street Blues" (Spencer Williams) - 5:58
3. "Way Down Yonder in New Orleans" (Henry Creamer, Turner Layton) - 5:58
4. "Milenburg Joys" (Paul Mares, Walter Melrose, Fred "Jelly Roll" Morton, Leon Roppolo) - 8:28
5. "You Are My Sunshine" (Jimmie Davis) - 3:54
6. "Burgundy Street Blues" (George Lewis) - 6:30
7. "When It's Sleepy Time Down South" (Clarence Muse, Leon Rene, Otis South Rene) - 9:21
8. "Royal Garden Blues" (Clarence Williams, Spencer Williams) - 5:41
9. "Do You Know What It Means (To Miss New Orleans)" (Louis Alter, Eddie DeLange) - 6:54
10. "Just a Closer Walk with Thee" (traditional) - 7:51
11. "When the Saints (Go Marching In)" (traditional) - 7:23

== Personnel ==
- Bob French - drums, vocals
- Troy Andrews - trombone
- Leonard Brown - trumpet
- Harry Connick, Jr. - piano
- Edward Huntington - banjo
- Branford Marsalis - saxophone
- Chris Severin - bass
- Ellen Smith - vocals

== Reception ==
- AllMusic
- The Gazette
- New York Times (Favorable)
- offBeat (Favorable)
- Philadelphia Daily News A
