= Upward Spiral (album) =

Studio album by Branford Marsalis Quartet
- Released: June 10, 2016
- Recorded: December 16–19, 2015
- Studio: Ellis Marsalis Center for Music, New Orleans
- Genre: Jazz
- Length: 66:18
- Label: Marsalis Music/OKeh

Branford Marsalis Quartet chronology
Four MFs Playin' Tunes (2012)	Upward Spiral (2016)	The Secret Between the Shadow and the Soul (2019)

Upward Spiral is an album by the Branford Marsalis Quartet with vocalist Kurt Elling. It was nominated for the Grammy Award for Best Jazz Vocal Album.

== Recording and music ==
The album was recorded at the Ellis Marsalis Center for Music, New Orleans, on December 16–19, 2015. The leader of the quartet, saxophonist Branford Marsalis, had not previously recorded an entire album with one vocalist. The other members were pianist Joey Calderazzo, bassist Eric Revis, and drummer Justin Faulkner. The music is a mix of upbeat material and some that "ponders loss, pain, dashed expectations and accommodation to all three". Elling sings "Só Tinha De Ser Com Você" in Portuguese.

== Release and reception ==
Professional ratings
Review scores
Source	Rating
AllMusic	4/5 stars
DownBeat	4.5/5 stars

Upward Spiral was released by Marsalis Music/OKeh Records on June 10, 2016. The AllMusic reviewer wrote: "Upward Spiral is less an album featuring a singer backed by a jazz ensemble, and more of an album that details the meeting of two highly creative artists whose talents intertwine to find new avenues of expression." The DownBeat reviewer concluded: "When the albums ends, your first thought may well be, When are these guys going to do this again?"

== Track listing ==
1. "There's a Boat Dat's Leavin' Soon for New York"
2. "Blue Gardenia"
3. "From One Island to Another"
4. "Practical Arrangement"
5. "Doxy"
6. "I'm a Fool to Want You"
7. "West Virginia Rose"
8. "Só Tinha De Ser Com Você"
9. "Momma Said"
10. "Cassandra Song"
11. "Blue Velvet"
12. "The Return"

== Personnel ==
- Branford Marsalis – tenor sax, soprano sax
- Kurt Elling – vocals
- Joey Calderazzo – piano
- Eric Revis – bass
- Justin Faulkner – drums
