= Royal Garden Blues (album) =

Studio album by Branford Marsalis
- Released: 1986
- Studio: RCA (New York City, New York); Blue Wave (St. Philip, Barbados); Newbury Sound (Boston, Massachusetts)
- Genre: Jazz
- Label: Columbia
- Producer: Delfeayo Marsalis

Branford Marsalis chronology
Romances for Saxophone (1986)	Royal Garden Blues (1986)	Renaissance (1987)

Royal Garden Blues is an album by the American saxophonist Branford Marsalis, released in 1986. Marsalis promoted it with a North American tour.

The album was nominated for a Grammy Award for "Best Jazz Instrumental Performance, Soloist". It peaked at No. 2 on Billboard's Traditional Jazz Albums chart.

== Production ==
Royal Garden Blues was produced by Delfeayo Marsalis. Ron Carter and Herbie Hancock contributed to the album.

The title track is a cover of the jazz standard. Its video was directed by Spike Lee. "Strike Up the Band" is a version of the song composed by George Gershwin. "Emanon" was written by Wynton Marsalis. "Shadows was written by Larry Willis. Ellis Marsalis Jr. played piano on "Swingin' at the Haven", which he also wrote. "The Wrath of Tain", a tribute to drummer Jeff "Tain" Watts, was written by Branford.

== Critical reception ==
Professional ratings
Review scores
Source	Rating
AllMusic	4/5 stars
Robert Christgau	B+
The Encyclopedia of Popular Music	3/5 stars
Los Angeles Times	4/5 stars
MusicHound Jazz: The Essential Album Guide	3/5 stars
The Penguin Guide to Jazz Recordings	3.5/4 stars
The Rolling Stone Album Guide	3.5/5 stars
Windsor Star	A

Robert Christgau labeled Marsalis the "more fun" member of the family, but determined that "his artistic personality is still unformed." The Los Angeles Times noted that "despite having been bitten by the rhythm-and-blues bug and stung by Sting, the saxophonist-leader leaves no doubt that jazz is his home turf." The Sun-Sentinel stated that the music "is played very conservatively, without any hint of modern musical forms, instrumentation or rhythms."

The Chicago Tribune concluded: "Formerly inclined to summon up as much heat as possible, Marsalis seems to have realized that he is not a passionate, ecstatic player but a coolheaded, technically agile craftsman." The New York Times wrote that the album is "steeped in the songful, harmonically complex style of the mid-1960's Miles Davis quintet and of the Blue Note Records stable." The Sunday Times considered the title track "a serious, unflinching improvisation."

AllMusic deemed Royal Garden Blues "one of Branford's more playful albums."

== Track listing ==
No.	Title	Writer(s)	Length
1.	"Swingin' at the Haven"	Ellis Marsalis Jr.	6:11
2.	"Dienda"	Kenny Kirkland	7:13
3.	"Strike Up the Band"	George Gershwin	4:19
4.	"Emanon"	Wynton Marsalis	7:23
5.	"Royal Garden Blues"	Clarence Williams, Spencer Williams	7:04
6.	"Shadows"	Larry Willis	9:29
7.	"The Wrath of Tain"	Branford Marsalis	8:57

== Personnel ==
- Branford Marsalis – tenor saxophone (1, 3, 4, 6, 7), soprano saxophone (2, 5, 7)
- Ellis Marsalis Jr. – acoustic piano (1)
- Kenny Kirkland – acoustic piano (2, 7)
- Larry Willis – acoustic piano (3, 5, 6)
- Herbie Hancock – acoustic piano (4)
- Ron Carter – bass (1, 4, 5)
- Charnett Moffett – bass (2, 3, 7)
- Ira Coleman – bass (6)
- Ralph Peterson Jr. – drums (1)
- Jeff "Tain" Watts – drums (2–4, 7)
- Al Foster – drums (5)
- Marvin "Smitty" Smith – drums (6)

Production

- George Butler – executive producer
- Delfeayo Marsalis – producer, mixing, editing
- Tim "Cheem" Geelan – engineer (1, 4)
- Patrick Smith – mixing (1, 4)
- Jim Scott – engineer (2, 3, 5–7), mixing (2, 3, 5–7)
- Branford Marsalis – mixing (2, 3, 5–7)
- Dennis Ferrante – assistant engineer
- Tony Dawsey – mastering
- Alan Moy – mastering
- Masterdisk (New York, NY) – mastering location
- Mark Larson – design
- Robert Cohen – photography
