= Amanecer =

Amanecer may refer to:

== Music ==
- Amanecer (Joey Calderazzo album), 2007
- Amanecer (Bomba Estéreo album), 2015
- "Amanecer" (song), 2015, performed by Spanish singer Edurne
- "Amanecer", a 1978 song by Armando Manzanero
- "Amanecer", a 1982 song by Tish Hinojosa

== Other uses ==
- Amanecer (film), a 2009 short film by Alvaro D. Ruiz
- CP Amanecer, a Spanish football team
- Amanecer (TV series), a 2025 Mexican telenovela by TelevisaUnivision

== See also ==
- Amanecer de un sueño (Awaking from a Dream), a 2008 Spanish film
- Rojo Amanecer (Red Dawn), a 1989 Mexican film
