= The Secret Between the Shadow and the Soul =

Live album by Branford Marsalis Quartet
- Released: March 2019
- Recorded: May 28–30, 2018
- Venue: Alexander Theatre at Monash University, Clayton campus, Australia
- Genre: Jazz
- Label: Marsalis Music
- Producer: Branford Marsalis

Branford Marsalis chronology
Upward Spiral (2016)	The Secret Between the Shadow and the Soul (2019)	Belonging (2025)

The Secret Between the Shadow and the Soul is a live album by the Branford Marsalis Quartet, recorded in Australia in May 2018. The album received a Grammy Award nomination for Best Jazz Instrumental Album.

== Track listing ==
1. "Dance of the Evil Toys" (Eric Revis) – 8:23
2. "Conversation Among the Ruins" (Joey Calderazzo) – 8:46
3. "Snake Hip Waltz" (Andrew Hill) – 5:51
4. "Cianna" (Joey Calderazzo) – 7:32
5. "Nilaste" (Eric Revis) – 10:15
6. "Life Filtering from the Water Flowers" (Branford Marsalis) – 9:00
7. "The Windup" (Keith Jarrett) – 12:30
