= A Duo Occasion =

Video by Harry Connick Jr. and Branford Marsalis
- Released: November 22, 2005
- Recorded: June 24, 2005; Library and Archives Canada
- Genres: Jazz, instrumental
- Length: 84:00
- Label: Marsalis Music/Rounder
- Director: Pierre Lamoureux
- Producers: Maria Betro; Sherry McAdams

Harry Connick Jr. chronology
Only You: In Concert (2004)	A Duo Occasion (2005)

Professional ratings
Review scores
Source	Rating
PopMatters	8/10
Blogcritics	
All About Jazz	

A Duo Occasion is live performance video with Harry Connick Jr. on piano and Branford Marsalis on saxophone(s), released on DVD in November 2005. It was recorded at the Library and Archives Canada as part of the 25th anniversary of the Ottawa Jazz Festival on June 24, 2005.

The performance contains music from the album Occasion : Connick on Piano, Volume 2, except "Chattanooga Choo Choo" and "Light the Way".

== Track listing ==
No.	Title	Writer(s)	Length
1.	"Chattanooga Choo Choo" (piano solo)	Harry Warren
2.	"Brown World"	Harry Connick Jr
3.	"Occasion"	Branford Marsalis
4.	"Valentine's Day"	Connick
5.	"Good To Be Home"	Connick
6.	"Virgoid"	Connick
7.	"I Like Love More"	Connick
8.	"Spot"	Connick
9.	"Steve Lacy"	Marsalis
10.	"Light The Way"	Connick
11.	"Chanson Du Vieux Carré"	Connick
