= Romare Bearden Revealed =

Studio album by Branford Marsalis Quartet
- Released: September 2003
- Recorded: June 2003
- Genre: Jazz
- Length: 69:00
- Label: Marsalis Music
- Producer: Branford Marsalis

Branford Marsalis Quartet chronology
Footsteps of Our Fathers (2002)	Romare Bearden Revealed (2003)	Eternal (2004)

Professional ratings
Review scores
Source	Rating
AllMusic	4/5 stars
The Penguin Guide to Jazz Recordings	3.5/4 stars

Romare Bearden Revealed is a jazz album by the Branford Marsalis Quartet, featuring Branford Marsalis, Eric Revis, Jeff "Tain" Watts, and Joey Calderazzo, with guest appearances by Harry Connick Jr., Wynton Marsalis, Doug Wamble, Reginald Veal, and other members of the Marsalis family. The album, which was recorded June 23–25, 2003 at Clinton Studios in New York, New York, was recorded in celebration of a retrospective exhibit of the art of Romare Bearden which opened at the National Gallery of Art in Washington DC and subsequently traveled to San Francisco, Dallas, New York and Atlanta in 2004 and 2005. The album recorded jazz tunes whose names Bearden had used for paintings as well as original compositions.

== Reception ==
The album peaked at number 19 on the Billboard Top Jazz Albums chart.

Writing for AllMusic.com, Matt Collar called the album an "earthy and accessible homage" to Bearden, noting strong performances by Wynton Marsalis, Harry Connick, Jr., and Doug Wamble.

Ben Ratliff in the New York Times says the album "reflects the nexus of country and city" and calls the performance by Marsalis's quartet "reliably hot." JazzTimes called Marsalis's playing "better than ever" and noted the "joyous, emphatic quality" of the performances.

== Track listing ==
No.	Title	Length
1.	"I'm Slappin' Seventh Avenue" (Duke Ellington/Irving Mills/Henry Nemo)	2:01
2.	"Jungle Blues" (Jelly Roll Morton)	8:48
3.	"Seabreeze" (Fred Norman/Larry Douglas/Romare Bearden)	6:13
4.	"J Mood" (Wynton Marsalis)	10:48
5.	"B's Paris Blues" (Branford Marsalis)	4:27
6.	"Autumn Lamp" (Doug Wamble)	2:52
7.	"Steppin' on the Blues" (Lovie Austin/Jimmy O'Bryant/Tommy Ladnier)	4:53
8.	"Laughin' and Talkin' with Higg" (Jeff "Tain" Watts)	10:40
9.	"Carolina Shout" (James P. Johnson)	2:35

== Personnel ==
- Branford Marsalis – saxophones
- Eric Revis – bass
- Jeff "Tain" Watts – drums
- Joey Calderazzo – piano

=== Guests ===
- Harry Connick, Jr. – piano
- Delfeayo Marsalis – trombone
- Ellis Marsalis, Jr. – piano
- Jason Marsalis – drums
- Wynton Marsalis – trumpet
- Reginald Veal – bass
- Doug Wamble – guitar
