= Haiku (Joey Calderazzo album) =

Recording by Joey Calderazzo
- Released: 2004
- Recorded: August 2002
- Venue: George Weston Recital Hall, Toronto
- Genre: Jazz
- Label: Marsalis Music
- Producer: Branford Marsalis

Haiku is a solo piano album by Joey Calderazzo. It was recorded in 2002 and released by Marsalis Music.

== Recording and music ==
The album of solo piano performances by Calderazzo was recorded in August 2002. For the album, he played a Steinway piano at the George Weston Recital Hall in Toronto. The material is a mix of standards, Calderazzo originals, and one composition each by Branford Marsalis and Kenny Kirkland. Marsalis was also the album's producer.

== Release and reception ==
Professional ratings
Review scores
Source	Rating
AllMusic	4.5/5 stars
The Penguin Guide to Jazz	4/4 stars

Haiku was released by Marsalis Music in 2004. The AllMusic reviewer described it as "thoughtful, lyrical, melodic, and a bit introspective", and suggested that its quietness prevented it from being more than "merely a brilliant set of restrained improvising". The Penguin Guide to Jazz called it "an astoundingly good record" and wrote that "There's no sense of right and left [hands] working independently, but rather as a unit". The JazzTimes wrote that "most of Haiku vacillates oddly between overstatement and understatement" and that the slower pieces were meandering and too long.

== Track listing ==
1. "Bri's Dance"
2. "Haiku"
3. "The Legend of Dan"
4. "Chopin"
5. "Just One of Those Things"
6. "Dienda"
7. "A Thousand Autumns"
8. "Dancin' for Singles"
9. "My One and Only Love"
10. "Bri's Dance – Revisited"

== Personnel ==
- Joey Calderazzo – piano
