= Requiem (Branford Marsalis album) =

Studio album by Branford Marsalis Quartet
- Released: March 1999
- Recorded: August & December 1998
- Genre: Jazz
- Length: 69:29
- Label: Sony Music
- Producer: Delfeayo Marsalis

Branford Marsalis Quartet chronology
Music Evolution (1997)	Requiem (1999)	Contemporary Jazz (2000)

Professional ratings
Review scores
Source	Rating
AllMusic	4/5 stars
Entertainment Weekly	B+
Jazz Review	5/5 stars
The Penguin Guide to Jazz Recordings	3.5/4 stars

Requiem is a jazz album by the Branford Marsalis Quartet, featuring Branford Marsalis, Eric Revis, Jeff "Tain" Watts, and Kenny Kirkland. The recording, Kirkland's last before his death in November 1998, was dedicated to his memory. Recorded August 17–20 and December 9–10, 1998 in the Tarrytown Music Hall in Tarrytown, New York, the album reached Number 8 on the Billboard Top Jazz Albums chart.

After several years of recordings in trio and other formats, the Requiem recording reunited Marsalis and Watts with Kirkland, who had been his collaborator on many earlier outings. After the August recording sessions, the quartet took the material on the road, with the goal of returning to the studio after the material had been honed on stage. Following Kirkland's death the remaining players recorded as a trio, capturing the song "Elysium".

In his AllMusic review, Richard Ginell says the album "an uncompromising, well-played disc of acoustic jazz that leans a bit toward adventure at times… in what turned out to be the swan song for one of the neo-bop era's finest lineups." Josef Woodard, in Entertainment Weekly called the album an "inspiring set that showcases Marsalis' expressive fluidity and lends a rueful, finalizing punctuation mark to Kirkland's brilliant and too-brief career." Writing for All About Jazz, Ian Nicolson noted that the album captures "the sound of a hot, creative musician flourishing in a hot, creative environment, captured largely live on analogue 24-track." James Shell's review for JazzReview.com called the work "unquestionably Branford's best to date," noting "its reliance on the Keith Jarrett quartet of the mid-seventies as a model."

== Track listing ==
All tracks are written by Branford Marsalis, except where indicated.

No.	Title	Length
1.	"Doctone"	6:07
2.	"Trieste" (Paul Motian)	8:23
3.	"A Thousand Autumns"	10:38
4.	"Lykief"	9:40
5.	"Bullworth"	6:35
6.	"Elysium"	9:35
7.	"Cassandra"	8:48
8.	"16th St. Baptist Church"	9:43

== Personnel ==
- Branford Marsalis – saxophones
- Eric Revis - bass
- Jeff "Tain" Watts - drums
- Kenny Kirkland - piano (all tracks except "Elysium")
