= Trio Jeepy =

Studio album by Branford Marsalis
- Released: June 1989
- Recorded: January 3 & 4, 1988
- Studio: Astoria (New York City)
- Genre: Jazz
- Length: 73:32
- Label: Sony Music
- Producer: Delfeayo Marsalis

Branford Marsalis chronology
| Random Abstract (1987) | Trio Jeepy (1989) | Do the Right Thing (1989) |

Trio Jeepy is a jazz album by saxophonist Branford Marsalis, in which he leads a trio featuring notable bassist Milt Hinton. Recorded January 3–4, 1988, at Astoria Studios in New York City and released in 1989, Trio Jeepy was later nominated for a Grammy Award in the 1989 category for 'Best Jazz Instrumental Performance, Group'.

Marsalis' cover of "Makin' Whoopee" would become the first music video featured on VH1 Smooth upon its initial broadcast on August 1, 1998.

== Reception ==
Professional ratings
Review scores
| Source | Rating |
|---|---|
| AllMusic | 4.5/5 stars |
| The Penguin Guide to Jazz Recordings | 3/4 stars |

The importance of Hinton's performance was highlighted in a contemporary review by the Jazz Journal, which described his contribution "as tasty as ever" and Marsalis to be "well served" by the octogenarian bass player. Commentary by The New York Times similarly declared Trio Jeepy to be "a catalogue of Mr. Hinton's diverse skills". In a positive review for The Guardian, John Fordham described the trio Marsalis assembled for Trio Jeepy to be a "shifting, ambiguous rhythmic tapestry" that a "soloist of Marsalis' skills can erupt over", labelling the trio a 'tour de force'.

Billboard selected Trio Jeepy as one of their Top Jazz Albums of 1989.

In an AllMusic review, Scott Yanow commented that Marsalis "clearly had a lot of fun during this set... The performances are quite spontaneous (the occasional mistakes were purposely left in) and Marsalis really romps on such tunes as 'Three Little Words', 'Makin' Whoopee', and 'Doxy'. On the joyful outing that is also one of Branford Marsalis' most accessible recordings, Milt Hinton often steals the show."

== Track listing (compact disc) ==
1. "Housed from Edward" (Branford Marsalis) - 9:29
2. "The Nearness of You" (Hoagy Carmichael, Ned Washington) - 10:34
3. "Three Little Words" (Bert Kalmar, Harry Ruby) - 5:07
4. "Makin' Whoopee" (Walter Donaldson, Gus Kahn) - 0:47
5. "U.M.M.G." (Billy Strayhorn) - 7:09
6. "Gutbucket Steepy" (Milt Hinton, Branford Marsalis, Jeff Watts) - 6:18
7. "Doxy" (Sonny Rollins) - 7:57
8. "Makin' Whoopee (Reprise)" (Donaldson/Kahn) - 9:06
9. "Peace" (Ornette Coleman) - 9:09
10. "Random Abstract (Tain's Rampage)" (Branford Marsalis) - 8:00

Note: The original LP and cassette releases included one additional track, a version of "Stardust" lasting 9:07 and featuring Milt Hinton and Jeff Watts.

== Personnel ==
- Branford Marsalis - saxophones
- Jeff "Tain" Watts - drums
- Milt Hinton - bass (tracks 1–6, 8)
- Delbert Felix - bass (tracks 7, 9, 10)
