= Marsalis Music Honors Series: Jimmy Cobb =

Studio album by Jimmy Cobb
- Released: March 14, 2006 (U.S.); March 20, 2006 (U.K.)
- Recorded: University of North Carolina - Greensboro, School of Music, Greensboro, North Carolina; March 7–8, 2005
- Genre: Jazz
- Length: 62 minutes
- Label: Marsalis Music/Rounder
- Producer: Branford Marsalis

Professional ratings
Review scores
Source	Rating
The Penguin Guide to Jazz Recordings	3/4 stars

Marsalis Music Honors Series: Jimmy Cobb is a jazz album by drummer Jimmy Cobb. Marsalis Music and Rounder Records jointly released the album in 2006 as part of the Marsalis Music Honors series. The album's musicians include Ellis Marsalis Jr. on piano.

== Track listing ==
1. "Mr. Lucky" (Henry Mancini) - 6:32
2. "W.K." (Jimmy Cobb, David Matthews) - 7:12
3. "Eleanor (Sister Cobb)" (Jimmy Cobb) - 6:11
4. "Composition 101" (Jimmy Cobb) - 6:46
5. "Can You Read My Mind" (John Williams) - 7:31
6. "There is Something About You (I Don't Know)" (Andrew "Tex" Allen") - 5:56
7. "Johnny One Note" (Richard Rodgers, Lorenz Hart) - 6:05
8. "Real Time" (Richard Tee) - 4:16
9. "Tell Me" (Ellis Marsalis) - 5:16
10. "Tune 341" (Jimmy Cobb, David Matthews) - 6:12

== Personnel ==
- Jimmy Cobb – drums
- Ellis Marsalis – piano
- Andrew Speight – saxophone
- Orlando Le Fleming – bass
