= Orlando le Fleming =

English cricketer and jazz musician

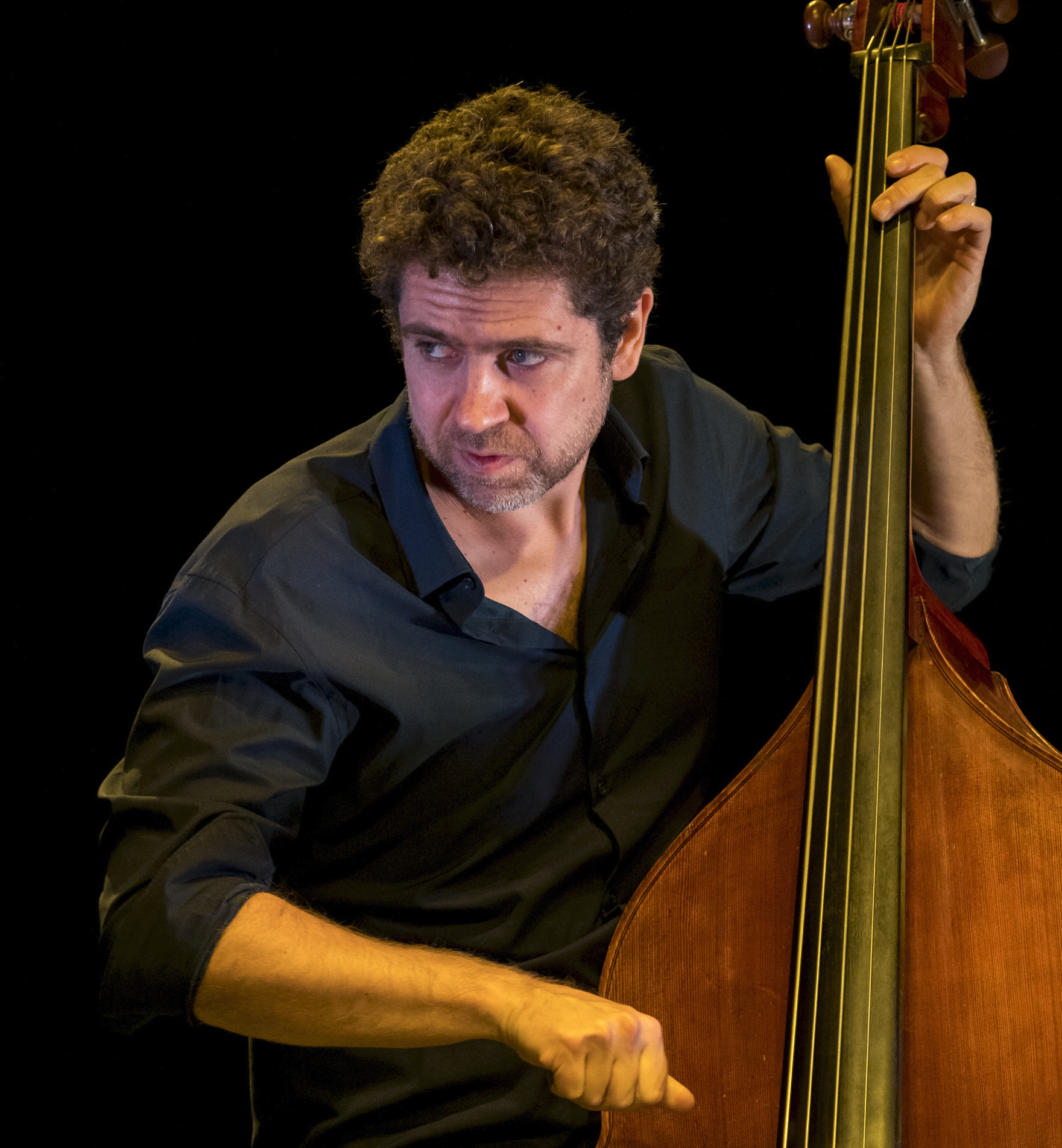

Background information
- Born: 7 July 1976 (age 50); Birmingham, Warwickshire, England
- Genre: Jazz
- Occupations: Musician, composer
- Instrument: Bass
- Years active: 2000–present
- Labels: Whirlwind, OLF, Nevelle, Nineteen-Eight, Losen, OWL
- Website: orlandolefleming.com

Antony Orlando Frank le Fleming (born 7 July 1976) is a jazz musician and English cricketer.

== Biography ==
=== Cricket ===
Orlando le Fleming made his county debut for Devon in the 1992 Minor Counties Championship against Cheshire. At the age of 15, he was the second youngest player to turn out for Devon. He was a right-handed batsman who bowled right-arm medium pace. From 1992 to 1996, he represented Devon in 24 Minor Counties Championship matches, with his final match coming against Shropshire. He also played two List-A matches for Devon, the first of which came in the 1994 NatWest Trophy against Yorkshire, where le Fleming took 2/42. His second and final List-A game came against Essex in the 1996 NatWest Trophy. In 1995 he played eight Second Eleven Championship matches for the Somerset Second XI.

=== Jazz career ===
After retiring from cricket, Fleming studied music at The Royal Academy of Music and went on to play and tour with UK musicians such as Julian Joseph, Jason Rebello, Tommy Smith, and Iain Ballamy. In 2003 he moved to New York City and joined Jane Monheit's band, appearing on her albums Taking a Chance On Love, Surrender and The Season. Three years later he played on Jimmy Cobb's album. In 2007 he started his association with Ari Hoenig and played on his albums Berts Playground, Lines of Oppression, The Pauper and Magician, and NY Standard. In 2010 Fleming released his first solo album, From Brooklyn with Love, with drummer Antonio Sanchez, Will Vinson and Lage Lund. He formed the OWL Trio with Lund and Vinson.

== Educational materials ==
- 2019 Get It Together
- 2020 Polymuting

== Discography ==
=== As leader ===
- From Brooklyn with Love (Nineteen-Eight, 2010)
- Orlando Le Fleming & Romantic Funk (OLF, 2017)
- Romantic Funk (Whirlwind, 2020)

With OWL Trio

- OWL Trio (Losen, 2013)
- Life of the Party (Newvelle, 2020)

=== As sideman ===
- Iain Ballamy, More Jazz (Basho, 2007)
- Seamus Blake, Way Out Willy (Criss Cross, 2007)
- Joey Calderazzo, Going Home (Sunnyside, 2015)
- Jimmy Cobb, Marsalis Music Honors Jimmy Cobb (Marsalis Music, 2006)
- Billy Cobham, The Art of Five (In+Out, 2004)
- Ari Hoenig, Bert's Playground (Dreyfus, 2008)
- Ari Hoenig, NY Standard (Fresh Sound, 2018)
- Lage Lund, Early Songs (Criss Cross, 2008)
- Harvey Mason, Changing Partners (Videoarts, 2006)
- Tobias Meinhart, Silent Dreamer (Enja, 2015)
- Jane Monheit, Taking a Chance On Love (Sony, 2004)
- Jane Monheit, The Season (Epic, 2005)
- Jane Monheit, Surrender (Concord, 2007)
- Nerina Pallot, Dear Frustrated Superstar (Polydor, 2001)
- Gerard Presencer, The Optimist (Linn, 2000)
- Jochen Rueckert, Charm Offensive (Pirouet, 2016)
- Ben Sidran, Don't Cry for No Hipster (Nardis, 2012)
- Jeff "Tain" Watts, Detained in Amsterdam (Dark Key Music, 2018)
