= Two Blocks from the Edge =

Studio album by Michael Brecker
- Released: May 1998
- Recorded: December 20–23, 1997
- Studio: Avatar (New York, New York)
- Genre: Jazz
- Length: 55:43
- Label: Impulse! Records
- Producer: Michael Brecker: Joey Calderazzo

Michael Brecker chronology
Tales from the Hudson (1996)	Two Blocks from the Edge (1998)	Time Is of the Essence (1999)

== Critical reception ==
Professional ratings
Review scores
Source	Rating
AllMusic	4.5/5 stars
The Penguin Guide to Jazz Recordings	3/4 stars

Two Blocks from the Edge is Michael Brecker's fifth album as a leader. It was recorded in 1997 at Avatar Studios in New York City, and released in 1998. It features pianist Joey Calderazzo and drummer Jeff “Tain” Watts, noted for their work with Branford Marsalis.

== Track listing ==
All tracks composed by Michael Brecker, except where indicated.

1. "Madame Toulouse" - 5:19
2. "Two Blocks from the Edge" - 8:32
3. "Bye George" (Joey Calderazzo) - 6:59
4. "El Niño" (Joey Calderazzo) - 7:41
5. "Cat’s Cradle" (Joey Calderazzo) - 6:43
6. "The Impaler" (Jeff "Tain" Watts) - 7:13
7. "How Long ‘Til the Sun" - 7:39
8. "Delta City Blues" - 5:37

== Personnel ==
- Michael Brecker – tenor saxophone
- Joey Calderazzo – acoustic piano
- James Genus – bass
- Jeff 'Tain' Watts – drums

With:

- Don Alias – percussion

=== Technical personnel ===
- Michael Brecker – producer, arrangements (tracks 1, 7, 8)
- Joey Calderazzo – producer, arrangements (tracks 1, 7, 8)
- James Farber – recording and mixing
- Rory Romano – recording assistant, mix assistant
- Greg Calbi – mastering at Masterdisk, New York City, USA
- Steve Fallone – mastering assistant
- Hollis King – art direction
- Kevin Gaor – graphic design
- Timothy White – photography
- Gitte Gammelgaard – band photography
- Depth of Field – management
