= Braggtown =

Studio album by Branford Marsalis Quartet
- Released: September 12, 2006
- Recorded: March 13–16, 2006, Hayti Heritage Center, Durham, NC
- Genre: Jazz
- Length: 74:00
- Label: Marsalis Music
- Producer: Branford Marsalis

Branford Marsalis Quartet chronology
| A Love Supreme Live (2004) | Braggtown (2006) | American Spectrum (2008) |

Professional ratings
Review scores
| Source | Rating |
|---|---|
| Allmusic | 4/5 stars |
| Music Box | 4/5 stars |
| The Penguin Guide to Jazz Recordings | 3.5/4 stars |

Braggtown is an album released by The Branford Marsalis Quartet in 2006.

The album, following the 2004 Grammy-nominated Eternal, draws upon a world of inspirations, including John Coltrane, a 17th-century English composer, an American Indian Warrior and a Japanese horror film. Marsalis chose some of the new songs from the band's current repertoire, with an emphasis on what he describes as "that kind of high-energy music we've been playing in live performance."

This album was named after Braggtown, a neighborhood located in the northeastern corner of Durham, North Carolina, as Marsalis has been a resident of the Durham area for the past few years.

The cover of the album shows the four musicians in a locker room in the baseball stadium Durham Bulls Athletic Park.

== Track listing ==
1. "Jack Baker" (Branford Marsalis) - 14:12
2. "Hope" (Joey Calderazzo) - 11:01
3. "Fate" (Marsalis) - 08:24
4. "Blakzilla" (Jeff "Tain" Watts) - 12:40
5. "O Solitude" (Henry Purcell) - 07:48
6. "Sir Roderick, the Aloof" (Marsalis) - 05:45
7. "Black Elk Speaks" (Eric Revis) - 14:10

== Personnel ==
- Branford Marsalis – saxophones
- Joey Calderazzo – piano
- Eric Revis – bass
- Jeff "Tain" Watts – drums

== Charts ==
- 2006 Top Jazz Albums # 14
