= Jeff "Tain" Watts =

American jazz drummer (born 1960)

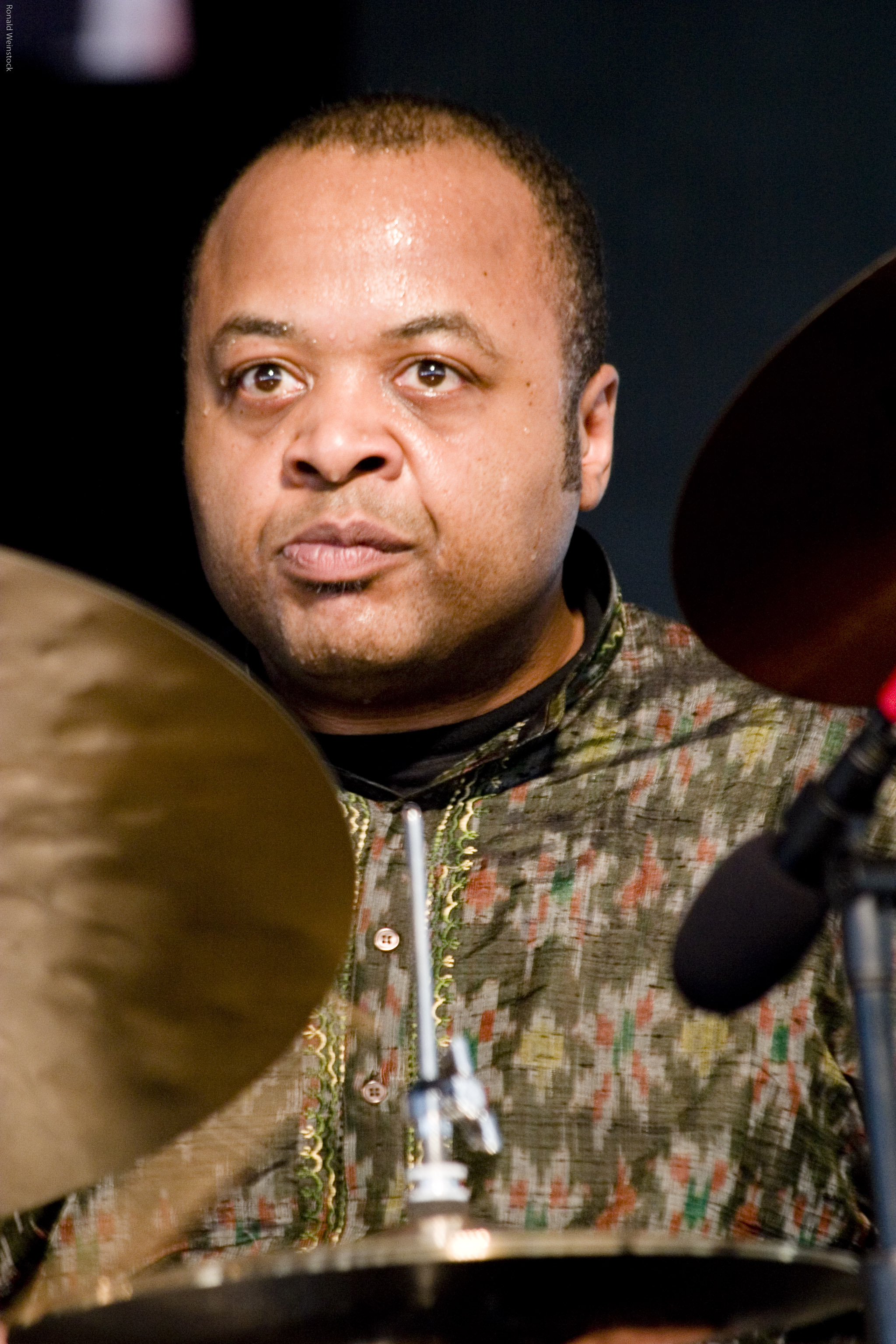
- Watts performing with Branford Marsalis in JazzFest 2007

Background information
- Also known as: Tain
- Born: January 20, 1960 (age 66); Pittsburgh, Pennsylvania, U.S.
- Origin: Pittsburgh, Pennsylvania, US
- Genres: Jazz
- Occupations: Musician, bandleader, actor
- Instrument: Drums
- Label: Sunnyside
- Website: tainish.com

Jeff "Tain" Watts (born January 20, 1960) is an American jazz drummer and composer who has worked across genres including Grammy wins with The Metropolitan Opera, Wynton Marsalis, Branford Marsalis Quartet and Mingus Big Band. Performing with Michael Brecker, Alice Coltrane, Kenny Garrett, McCoy Tyner, Ravi Coltrane, and others.

== Biography ==
Watts got the nickname "Tain" from Kenny Kirkland when they were on tour in Florida and drove past a Chieftain gas station. He was given a Guggenheim fellowship in music composition in 2017. Watts attended Berklee College of Music, where he met collaborator Branford Marsalis.

== Discography ==
=== As leader ===
- Megawatts (Sunnyside, 1991)
- Citizen Tain (Columbia, 1999)
- Bar Talk (Columbia, 2002)
- Detained at the Blue Note (Half Note, 2004)
- Folks Songs (Dark Key Music, 2011)
- Watts (Dark Key Music, 2009)
- Family (Dark Key Music, 2011)
- Blue, Vol. 1 (Dark Key Music, 2015)
- Blue, Vol. 2 (Dark Key Music, 2018)
- Detained in Amsterdam (Dark Key Music, 2018)

=== As sideman ===
With John Beasley

- Letter to Herbie (Resonance, 2008)
- Positootly! (Resonance, 2009)

With Paul Bollenback

- Double Gemini (Challenge, 1997)
- Soul Grooves (Challenge, 1999)
- Double Vision (Challenge, 2000)
- Dreams (Challenge, 2001)

With Michael Brecker

- Two Blocks from the Edge (Impulse!, 1998)
- Time Is of the Essence (Verve, 1999)

With Joey Calderazzo

- Simply Music (Lost Chart, 1997)
- Joey Calderazzo (Columbia, 2000)

With Charles Fambrough'

- The Proper Angle (CTI, 1991)
- The Charmer (CTI, 1992)

With Kenny Garrett

- Songbook (Warner, Bros., 1997)
- Simply Said (Warner, Bros., 1999)

With Jimmy Greene

- Forever (Criss Cross, 2004)
- Flowers Beautiful Life Vol. 2 (Mack Avenue, 2017)

With David Gilmore

- Unified Presence (RKM Music, 2006)
- Numerology Live at Jazz Standard (Evolutionary Music, 2012)

With Conrad Herwig

- Osteology (Criss Cross, 1998)
- Unseen Universe (Criss Cross, 2000)
- Land of Shadow (Criss Cross, 2002)
- Reflections (Criss Cross, 2016)

With Stanley Jordan

- Cornucopia (Blue Note, 1990)
- Live in New York (Blue Note, 1998)

With David Kikoski

- The Maze (Criss Cross, 1999)
- Almost Twilight (Criss Cross, 2000)
- Combinations (Criss Cross, 2001)
- Surf's Up (Criss Cross, 2001)
- The Five (DIW, 2002)
- Mostly Standards (Criss Cross, 2009)
- Consequences (Criss Cross, 2012)

With Joe Locke

- Beauty Burning (Sirocco, 2000)
- Storytelling (Sirocco, 2001)

With Branford Marsalis

- Scenes in the City (Columbia, 1984)
- Royal Garden Blues (CBS, 1986)
- Random Abstract (1988)
- Trio Jeepy (Columbia, 1989)
- Crazy People Music (Columbia, 1990)
- Mo' Better Blues (Columbia, 1990)
- The Beautyful Ones Are Not Yet Born (Columbia, 1991)
- I Heard You Twice the First Time (Columbia, 1992)
- Bloomington (Columbia, 1993)
- The Dark Keys (Columbia, 1996)
- Requiem (Columbia, 1999)
- Contemporary Jazz (Columbia, 2000)
- Footsteps of Our Fathers (Rounder/Marsalis Music, 2002)
- Romare Bearden Revealed (Rounder/Marsalis Music, 2003)
- A Love Supreme Live (Rounder/Marsalis Music, 2004)
- Eternal (Rounder, 2004)
- Braggtown (Rounder/Marsalis Music, 2006)
- Metamorphosen (Marsalis Music, 2009)

With Ellis Marsalis Jr.'

- Ellis Marsalis Trio (Somethin' Else, 1991)
- Whistle Stop (CBS, 1994)

With Wynton Marsalis

- Wynton Marsalis (Columbia, 1982)
- Think of One (CBS, 1983)
- Hot House Flowers (Columbia, 1984)
- Black Codes (From the Underground) (Columbia, 1985)
- J Mood (Columbia, 1986)
- Marsalis Standard Time, Vol. I (Columbia, 1987)
- The Wynton Marsalis Quartet Live at Blues Alley (CBS, 1988)
- Standard Time, Vol. 2: Intimacy Calling (Columbia, 1991)
- Thick in the South: Soul Gestures in Southern Blue, Vol. 1 (Columbia, 1991)

With Mingus Big Band

- Tonight at Noon... Three or Four Shades of Love (Dreyfus, 2002)
- Mingus Big Band Live at Jazz Standard (Mingus, 2010)

With Greg Osby

- Art Forum (Blue Note, 1996)
- Channel Three (Blue Note, 2005)

With Makoto Ozone

- Live & Let Live Love for Japan (Verve, 2011)
- My Witch's Blue (Verve, 2012)

With Danilo Perez

- Panamonk (Impulse!, 1996)
- Central Avenue (Impulse!, 1998)

With Courtney Pine

- The Vision's Tale (Antilles, 1989)
- Within the Realms of Our Dreams (Antilles, 1991)
- Underground (Talkin' Loud, 1997)

With Robert Stewart

- In the Gutta (Qwest, 1996)
- The Force (Qwest, 1998)

With Sadao Watanabe

- Parker's Mood (Elektra, 1985)
- Tokyo Dating (Elektra, 1985)

With Warren Wolf

- Black Wolf (M&I, 2009)
- Convergence (Mack Avenue, 2016)

With others

- Claudia Acuna, Rhythm of Life (Verve, 2002)
- Ron Affif, 52nd Street (Pablo, 1996)
- Geri Allen, The Nurturer (Blue Note, 1991)
- India Arie & Joe Sample, Christmas with Friends (Motown, 2015)
- Victor Bailey, Bottom's Up (Atlantic, 1989)
- Terence Blanchard, Terence Blanchard (Columbia, 1991)
- Michiel Borstlap, Gramercy Park (EmArcy, 2001)
- Robi Botos, Movin' Forward (A440, 2015)
- Don Braden, The Fire Within (RCA Victor, 1999)
- Donald Brown, Early Bird (Sunnyside, 1988)
- Billy Childs, The Child Within (Shanachie, 1996)
- Betty Carter, It's Not About the Melody (Verve, 1992)
- Steve Coleman, Weaving Symbolics (Label Bleu, 2006)
- Alice Coltrane, Translinear Light (Impulse!, 2004)
- Ravi Coltrane, Moving Pictures (BMG, 1998)
- Harry Connick Jr., When Harry Met Sally... (CBS, 1989)
- DR Big Band, The Impaler (Red Dot Music, 2010)
- Barbara Dennerlein, Outhipped (Universal, 1999)
- Doky Brothers, 2 Blue Note Medley (EMI, 1997)
- Chris Minh Doky, Cinematique (Blue Note, 2002)
- ELEW, And to the Republic (Sunnyside, 2016)
- Kurt Elling, The Questions (Okeh, 2018)
- Kevin Eubanks, East West Time Line (Mack Avenue, 2017)
- Robin Eubanks, Different Perspectives (JMT, 1988)
- Antonio Farao, Black Inside (Enja, 1999)
- Joe Ford, Today's Nights (Bluemoon, 1993)
- Ricky Ford, Hard Groovin' (Muse, 1989)
- Sonny Fortune, From Now On (Blue Note, 1996)
- Joe Gilman, Treasure Chest (Timeless, 1992)
- Paul Grabowsky, Tales of Time and Space (Warner, 2004)
- Lalah Hathaway, A Moment (Virgin, 1994)
- Robert Hurst, Robert Hurst Presents: Robert Hurst (Columbia, 1993)
- Rodney Jones, Dreams and Stories (Savant, 2005)
- Marlon Jordan, For You Only (Columbia, 1990)
- Ronny Jordan, A Brighter Day (Blue Note, 2000)
- Kenny Kirkland, Kenny Kirkland (GRP, 1991)
- Azar Lawrence, The Seeker (Sunnyside, 2014)
- Mark Ledford, Miles 2 Go (Verve Forecast 1998)
- Bill Lee, Do the Right Thing (Columbia, 1989)
- Buckshot LeFonque, Buckshot LeFonque (Columbia, 1994)
- Brian Lynch, Spheres of Influence (Sharp Nine, 1997)
- Russell Malone, Heartstrings (Verve, 2001)
- Rick Margitza, This Is New (Blue Note, 1991)
- Rene Marie, Vertigo (Maxjazz, 2001)
- Delfeayo Marsalis, Pontius Pilate's Decision (Novus, 1992)
- Hector Martignon, Refugee (Zoho, 2007)
- Pat Martino, Undeniable: Live at Blues Alley (HighNote, 2011)
- Harry Miller, Open House (Optimism, 1989)
- Bill Mobley, New Light (Space Time, 2008)
- Charnett Moffett, Music from Our Soul (Motema, 2017)
- Big Nick Nicholas, Big and Warm (India Navigation, 1983)
- Odean Pope, Odeans List (In+Out, 2009)
- Eric Revis, Tales of the Stuttering Mime (11:11, 2004)
- Jim Snidero, Mixed Bag (Criss Cross, 1988)
- Gary Thomas, Seventh Quadrant (Enja, 1987)
- Jean Toussaint, Blue Black (Space Time, 2001)
- Renee Rosnes, Life On Earth (Blue Note, 2001)
- Sonny Rollins, Falling in Love with Jazz (Milestone, 1989)
- Stephen Scott, Something to Consider (Verve, 1991)
- Lew Soloff, Rainbow Mountain (Enja, 1999)
- T. K. Blue, Eyes of the Elders (Arkadia, 2001)
- Take 6, Join the Band (Reprise, 1994)
- Alex Sipiagin, Steppin' Zone (Criss Cross, 2001)
- McCoy Tyner, Quartet (Half Note, 2007)
- Manuel Valera, Urban Landscape (Destiny, 2015)
- Mark Whitfield, True Blue (Verve, 1994)
- James Williams, Meet the Magical Trio (EmArcy, 1989)
- Larry Willis, Heavy Blue (SteepleChase, 1990)
- Ben Wolfe, No Stranger Here (Maxjazz, 2008)
- Chihiro Yamanaka, Outside by the Swing (Verve, 2005)

== Awards and honors ==
=== Grammy Awards ===
Year	Category	Title	Genre	Result	Notes
1985	Best Jazz Instrumental Performance, Group	Black Codes From the Underground	Jazz	Won	with Wynton Marsalis
1986	Best Jazz Instrumental Performance, Group	J Mood	Jazz	Won	with Wynton Marsalis
1987	Best Jazz Instrumental Performance, Group	Marsalis Standard Time - Vol. 1	Jazz	Won	with Wynton Marsalis
1992	Best Jazz Instrumental Performance, Group	I Heard You Twice the First Time	Jazz	Won	with Branford Marsalis
1990	Best Jazz Instrumental Performance, Group	Crazy People Music	Jazz	Nominated	with Branford Marsalis Quartet
1999	Best Jazz Instrumental Album by an Individual or Group	Requiem	Jazz	Nominated	with the Branford Marsalis Quartet.
2000	Best Jazz Instrumental Album by an Individual or Group	Contemporary Jazz	Jazz	Won	with the Branford Marsalis Quartet.
2004	Best Jazz Instrumental Album by an Individual or Group	Eternal	Jazz	Nominated	with the Branford Marsalis Quartet.
2010	Best Large Jazz Ensemble Album	Mingus Big Band Live at the Jazz Standard	Jazz	Won	with the Mingus Big Band
2023	Best Opera Recording	Fire Shut Up in My Bones (Blanchard)	Opera	Won	with the Metropolitan Opera
2024	Best Opera Recording	Champion (Blanchard)	Opera	Won	with the Metropolitan Opera
2025	Best Jazz Performance	Phoenix Reimagined (Live)	Jazz	Nominated	Lakecia Benjamin ft Randy Brecker, Jeff Tain Watts and John Scofield
