= Music Evolution =

Studio album by Buckshot LeFonque (Branford Marsalis)
- Released: April 1997
- Genres: Jazz rap; R&B
- Length: 64:14
- Label: Columbia
- Producer: Branford Marsalis

Branford Marsalis chronology
The Dark Keys (1996)	Music Evolution (1997)	Requiem (1999)

Music Evolution is the second album of Branford Marsalis's jazz/hip-hop/rock group Buckshot LeFonque. Featuring guest appearances from David Sanborn, Guru and Laurence Fishburne, the album peaked at number 8 on the Billboard Top Contemporary Jazz Albums chart. The track "Another Day" reached number 65 in the UK singles chart in December 1997. The album is notable in Branford's discography for marking his first collaboration with pianist Joey Calderazzo and bassist Eric Revis, both of whom would go on to record in his quartet in the 2000s and 2010s.

== Critical reception ==
Professional ratings
Review scores
Source	Rating
AllMusic	3/5 stars

In his AllMusic review, Leo Stanley calls the album a "stronger, more confident record" than the first Buckshot LeFonque album but criticizes it as uneven, noting that it "(finds) a vibrant, exciting common ground between hard bop and hip-hop" despite the "occasional lapse into aimless fusion." Writing in JazzTimes, Josef Woodard said the album "suggests a free-form radio show with an accent on African-American culture lineage." People magazine praised the album as "a sonic explosion that, even when it falters, is infused with the joy of playing."

== Track listing ==
All tracks are written by Branford Marsalis, except where indicated.

No.	Title	Length
1.	"Here We Go Again"	2:26
2.	"Music Evolution" (Branford Marsalis, Ricky Dacosta)	4:59
3.	"Wasineveritis"	0:15
4.	"James Brown Part I & II"	4:56
5.	"Another Day" (Branford Marsalis, Bill Gable, Frank McComb)	3:34
6.	"Try These On" (Branford Marsalis, Rocky Bryant, Ricky Dacosta)	5:44
7.	"A Buckshot Rebuttal"	0:23
8.	"My Way (Doin' It)" (Branford Marsalis, L. Carl Burnett, Laurence Fishburne)	4:08
9.	"Better Than I Am" (Branford Marsalis, Delfeayo Marsalis, Frank McComb)	5:02
10.	"Paris Is Burning"	0:26
11.	"Jungle Grove"	4:45
12.	"Weary with Toil" (Branford Marsalis, Delfeayo Marsalis)	5:00
13.	"Black Monday" (Branford Marsalis, Ricky Dacosta, Keith Elam)	5:45
14.	"Phoenix" (Branford Marsalis, Delfeayo Marsalis)	6:06
15.	"Samba Hop" (Branford Marsalis, Ricky Dacosta)	3:53
16.	"...And We Out"	1:46
17.	"One Block Past It" (Branford Marsalis, Frank McComb)	4:56

== Personnel ==
- Branford Marsalis – Saxophones
- DJ Apollo – Wheels O' Steel
- Rocky Bryant – Percussion
- Reginald Veal – Acoustic Bass
- L. Carl Burnett – Guitar
- Joey Calderazzo – Piano
- Russell Gunn – Trumpet
- Mino Cinelu – Percussion
- David Sanborn – Alto Saxophone
- Reggie Washington – Bass
- John Touchy – Trombone
- Will Lee – Bass
- Frank McComb – Keyboards, Vocals
- Sue Pray – Viola
- Julien Barber – Viola
- Barry Finclair – Violin
- John Pintavalle – Violin
- Donna Tecco – Violin
- Richard Locker – Cello
- Carol Webb Sotomme – Concert Master
- 50 Styles: The Unknown Soldier – Vocals
- Laurence Fishburne – Spoken Word
- Ben Wolfe – Acoustic Bass
- Delfeayo Marsalis – Trombone
- Eric Revis – Acoustic Bass
