= Loved Ones (album) =

Studio album by Ellis Marsalis and Branford Marsalis
- Released: February 1996
- Recorded: August & September 1995
- Genre: Jazz
- Length: 73:35
- Label: Sony
- Producer: Delfeayo Marsalis

Branford Marsalis chronology
Buckshot LeFonque (1994)	Loved Ones (1996)	The Dark Keys (1996)

Loved Ones is a jazz duo album by Ellis Marsalis and Branford Marsalis. Originally conceived as Ellis's solo record of songs about "unforgettable women," it became a duo project based on his realization that "Branford would sound really good on some of (the songs)." The album reached Number 5 on the Billboard Top Jazz Albums chart.

== Critical reception ==
Professional ratings
Review scores
Source	Rating
AllMusic	3.5/5 stars
Los Angeles Times	3.5/4 stars

In his AllMusic review, Scott Yanow calls the set "pleasing and thoughtful if not quite essential," noting that Branford's contributions "sometimes (liven) up the selections although mostly playing a subsidiary role to his father." Don Heckman, writing in the Los Angeles Times, called the recording "one of the most appealing CDs of the year," citing "the warm camaraderie of the father-son musical connection."

== Track listing ==
No.	Title	Length
1.	"Delilah (Delilah's Theme)" (Victor Young)	5:26
2.	"Maria" (Leonard Bernstein, Stephen Sondheim)	6:09
3.	"Lulu's Back in Town" (Al Dubin, Harry Warren)	4:55
4.	"Miss Otis Regrets" (Cole Porter)	4:41
5.	"Angelica" (Duke Ellington)	4:41
6.	"Stella by Starlight" (Ned Washington, Young)	7:00
7.	"Louise" (John Lee Hooker, Leo Robin, Richard A. Whiting)	4:14
8.	"Bess, You Is My Woman Now" (George Gershwin, Ira Gershwin, DuBose Heyward)	8:02
9.	"Liza (All the Clouds'll Roll Away)" (G. Gershwin, I. Gershwin, Gus Kahn)	2:35
10.	"Nancy With the Laughing Face" (Jimmy Van Heusen, Phil Silvers)	2:11
11.	"Laura" (Johnny Mercer, David Raksin)	6:19
12.	"Alice in Wonderland" (Sammy Fain, Bob Hilliard)	6:22
13.	"Sweet Lorraine" (Cliff Burwell, Mitchell Parish)	4:21
14.	"Dear Dolores" (Ellis Marsalis)	6:39

== Personnel ==
- Branford Marsalis – saxophones
- Ellis Marsalis – piano
