= Belonging (Branford Marsalis Quartet album) =

Studio album by Branford Marsalis Quartet
- Released: March 28, 2025
- Recorded: March 25–29, 2024
- Studio: Ellis Marsalis Center for Music (New Orleans)
- Length: 62:50
- Label: Blue Note
- Producer: Branford Marsalis

Branford Marsalis Quartet chronology
The Secret Between the Shadow and the Soul (2019)	Belonging (2025)

Belonging is a studio album by Branford Marsalis Quartet. It was released on March 28, 2025, through Blue Note Records, in CD, LP and digital formats.

== Background ==
Consisting of six tracks with a total runtime of approximately sixty-three minutes, the album is a reinterpretation of Belonging by Keith Jarrett. It is Branford Marsalis' first album released through Blue Note as a leader. He had previously released a collaborative project with Everette Harp titled Common Ground in 1993 on Blue Note Contemporary, a subdivision of Blue Note.

== Reception ==
Professional ratings
Review scores
Source	Rating
AllMusic	4/5 stars
The Observer	4/5 stars

AllMusic compared the album to Jarrett's Belonging, stating it encompasses "a fresh intensity, as well as a gregariousness to the material," also noting it taps "into Jarrett's more introspective qualities." Hank Shteamer, writing for The New York Times, remarked, "Marsalis has tackled imposing jazz masterworks before, covering the entirety of John Coltrane's A Love Supreme in the studio and onstage in the early 2000s, but at its best, his Belonging goes deeper."

The Observer rated the album four stars and noted, "It remains a towering piece, with Marsalis faithfully following Garbarek's mid-solo acrobatics, though his tone is a tad less abrasive, pianist Joey Calderazzo's chords less pummeling." Glide stated, "the granular detail of the arrangements and performances is readily discernible throughout Belonging."

== Track listing ==
All tracks are written by Keith Jarrett.

Belonging track listing
No.	Title	Length
1.	"Spiral Dance"	8:20
2.	"Blossom"	11:01
3.	"Long as You Know You're Living Yours"	8:55
4.	"Belonging"	7:35
5.	"The Windup"	12:40
6.	"Solstice"	14:19
Total length:		62:50

== Personnel ==
Credits adapted from the album's liner notes.

=== Branford Marsalis Quartet ===
- Branford Marsalis – saxophones, production, arrangement
- Joey Calderazzo – piano
- Eric Revis – bass
- Justin Faulkner – drums

=== Additional contributors ===
- Rob "Wacko" Hunter – recording, mixing
- Greg Calbi – mastering
- Justin Armstrong – recording assistance
- Joe Nino-Hernes – vinyl mastering
- Yvonne Schmedemann – cover photography
- Zach Smith – interior gatefold photography
