= Doug Wamble =

American songwriter (born 1972)

- Born: Samuel Douglas Wamble; October 22, 1972 (age 53); Clarksville, Tennessee, U.S.
- Occupations: Musician, vocalist
- Spouse: Morgan James (m. 2016)
- Musical career
- Genres: Jazz, blues, vocal jazz
- Instrument: Guitar
- Labels: Marsalis Music, E1, Halcyonic
- Website: www.dougwamble.com

Doug Wamble (born Samuel Douglas Wamble, October 22, 1972) is an American jazz guitarist and vocalist from Tennessee.

== Biography ==
Wamble grew up in Memphis, Tennessee. He was inspired to play guitar after hearing records by Charlie Christian. He entered Memphis State University intending to pursue audio engineering, but changed his mind after seeing Harry Connick Jr. and Russell Malone in concert. He switched to the University of North Florida, then got a master's degree from Northwestern University. At North Florida, he met pianist Roy Dunlap, bassist Jeff Hanley, and drummer Peter Miles, with whom he would later form a band.

In 1997, Wamble moved to New York City, where he met Wynton Marsalis. He played guitar on Big Train (1999) by Wynton Marsalis and Traveling Miles (1999) by Cassandra Wilson and signed with Marsalis Music. He released his debut album, Country Libations, in 2003. He was formerly married to opera singer Janna Baty.

He performed on the soundtrack for The War, a television documentary about World War II directed by Ken Burns. He contributed music to Burns's documentaries The 10th Inning and Prohibition and completed the original score for Burns's feature The Central Park Five. He produced the album Hunter (Epic, 2014) by vocalist Morgan James, whom he married in 2016.

== Discography ==
=== As leader ===
- Country Libations (Marsalis Music, 2003)
- Bluestate (Marsalis Music, 2005)
- Doug Wamble (E1, 2010)
- Volume 1 with Bill Frisell (DirectGrace 2008)
- Fast as Years, Slow as Days (Halcyonic, 2013)
- For Anew (Halcyonic, 2014)
- Rednecktelekctual (Halcyonic, 2014)
- The Traveler: Live in New York City (2015)
- Blues in the Present Tense (Halcyonic, 2022)

=== As sideman ===
With Wynton Marsalis

- Big Train (Columbia/Sony, 1999)
- Unforgivable Blackness: The Rise and Fall of Jack Johnson (Blue Note, 2004)
- The Music of John Lewis (Blue Engine, 2017)

With others

- Noel Akchote, Gesualdo: Madrigals for Five Guitars (Blue Chopsticks, 2014)
- The Avett Brothers, The Carpenter (American, 2012)
- Erik Friedlander, Bonebridge (Skipstone, 2011)
- Erik Friedlander, Nighthawks (Skipstone, 2014)
- Branford Marsalis, Romare Bearden Revealed (Marsalis Music, 2003)
- Natalie Merchant, Leave Your Sleep (Nonesuch, 2010)
- Geoff Muldaur, Private Astronomy: A Vision of the Music of Bix Beiderbecke (Edge Music, 2003)
- Eric Revis, Tales of the Stuttering Mime (11:11, 2004)
- Carrie Rodriguez, Love and Circumstance (Ninth Street Opus, 2010)
- Sachal Vasandani, Eyes Wide Open (Mack Avenue 2007)
- Cassandra Wilson, Traveling Miles (Blue Note, 1999)
- John Zorn, Voices in the Wilderness (Tzadik, 2003)

== Television appearances ==
- Talkin' Blues Bravo! Canada (2004)
