= Time Is of the Essence =

Studio album by Michael Brecker
- Released: October 1999
- Recorded: 1999
- Studio: Avatar (New York, New York); Right Track (New York, New York)
- Genre: Jazz
- Length: 69:31
- Label: Verve
- Producer: George Whitty

Michael Brecker chronology
Two Blocks from the Edge (1998)	Time Is of the Essence (1999)	Nearness of You: The Ballad Book (2001)

Professional ratings
Review scores
Source	Rating
Allmusic	3/5 stars
The Penguin Guide to Jazz Recordings	3.5/4 stars

Time Is of the Essence is Michael Brecker's sixth album as a leader. It was recorded at the Power Station and Right Track in New York City. The record is notable for guitarist Pat Metheny’s strong presence and three outstanding drummers- Jeff “Tain” Watts, Bill Stewart and the legendary Elvin Jones- who each play on separate tracks.

== Track listing ==
All tracks composed by Michael Brecker, except where indicated.

No.	Title	Writer(s)	Length
1.	"Arc of the Pendulum"		8:59
2.	"Sound Off"	Larry Goldings	6:05
3.	"Half Past Late"		6:06
4.	"Timeline"	Pat Metheny	6:06
5.	"The Morning of This Night"		7:41
6.	"Renaissance Man (for Eddie Harris)"	George Whitty	8:34
7.	"Dr. Slate"		7:39
8.	"As I Am"	Pat Metheny	6:48
9.	"Outrance"		10:07

== Personnel ==
=== Musicians ===
- Michael Brecker – tenor saxophone
- Larry Goldings – organ
- Pat Metheny – guitars
- Elvin Jones – drums (tracks 1, 4, 9)
- Jeff "Tain" Watts – drums (tracks 2, 5, 7)
- Bill Stewart – drums (tracks 3, 6, 8)

=== Technical personnel ===
- George Whitty – producer
- James Farber – recording and mixing
- Andrew Felus – recording assistant, mix assistant
- Andrea Yarkovsky – recording assistant, mix assistant
- Scott Young – recording assistant, mix assistant
- Greg Calbi – mastering at Sterling Sound, New York City, USA
- Camille Tominaro – production coordination
- Hollis King – art direction
- Leland Bobbé – cover photography
- Darryl Pitt – inside photography
