= Tales from the Hudson =

Studio album by Michael Brecker
- Released: June 1996
- Recorded: 1996
- Studio: Power Station (New York, New York)
- Genre: Jazz
- Length: 60:23
- Label: Impulse! Records
- Producer: Michael Brecker: George Whitty; Pat Metheny

Michael Brecker chronology
Out of the Loop (Brecker Brothers album) (1994)	Tales from the Hudson (1996)	Two Blocks from the Edge (1998)

Professional ratings
Review scores
Source	Rating
Allmusic	4/5 stars
The Penguin Guide to Jazz Recordings	3/4 stars

Tales from the Hudson is Michael Brecker's fourth album as a leader. It was recorded at the Power Station in New York City in 1996. The album won Brecker two Grammy awards for Best Jazz Instrumental Solo (for his solo on "Cabin Fever") and Best Jazz Instrumental Album, Individual or Group.

== Track listing ==
No.	Title	Writer(s)	Length
1.	"Slings and Arrows"	Brecker	8:19
2.	"Midnight Voyage"	Calderazzo	7:17
3.	"Song for Bilbao"	Metheny	5:44
4.	"Beau Rivage"	Brecker	7:38
5.	"African Skies"	Brecker	8:12
6.	"Introduction to Naked Soul"	Holland, Brecker	1:04
7.	"Naked Soul"	Brecker	8:43
8.	"Willie T."	Grolnick	8:13
9.	"Cabin Fever"	Brecker	6:59

== Personnel ==
=== Musicians ===
- Michael Brecker – tenor saxophone
- Joey Calderazzo – acoustic piano (tracks 1, 2, 4 and 6–9)
- McCoy Tyner – acoustic piano (tracks 3, 5)
- Pat Metheny – guitars, guitar synthesizer (track 3)
- Dave Holland – bass
- Jack DeJohnette – drums
- Don Alias – percussion (tracks 3, 5)

=== Technical personnel ===
- Michael Brecker – producer
- George Whitty – producer
- Pat Metheny – co-producer
- James Farber – recording and mixing
- Rory Romano – recording assistant, mix assistant
- Greg Calbi – mastering at Sterling Sound, New York City, USA
- Carolyn Chrzan – guitar technician
- Jerry Wortman – production coordinator
- Robin Lynch – art direction and design
- Jason Claiborne – design
- Nicol' Andrea – photography
- Darryl Pitt – page two photography
- Depth of Field Management – management
- Width of Field Management – management

== Awards ==
1997 – 40th Annual GRAMMY Awards

Years	Winner	Title	Category
1997	Michael Brecker	"Cabin Fever"	Grammy Award for Best Improvised Jazz Solo
1997	Michael Brecker	Tales from the Hudson	Grammy Award for Best Jazz Instrumental Album
