= Marsalis Jams =

Marsalis Jams is a program of the Music Education Initiative, Inc., a non-profit organization dedicated to furthering music education in schools and colleges and to seeking innovative ways to enhance public and community support for the arts. MEI was co-founded by jazz musicians Branford Marsalis and Harry Connick, Jr., and Marsalis Jams is its first program.

Marsalis Jams brings leading established jazz ensembles to high school and college campuses for interactive mini-residencies. The components of the program are workshops for student musicians, information sessions with the general student population, and a culminating performance in which the visiting group performs its own music and is then joined by student musicians for a jam session. The goals of the program are to (1) provide opportunities for student musicians to perform with established professional groups, (2) expose student audiences to live jazz performance, and (3) expand opportunities for working bands outside of the currently limited nightclub and concert settings.

In 2008, Marsalis Jams established Marsalis Berklee Jams, an ongoing program with the Berklee College of Music that brings bands to the school’s newly created performance space Café 939.

Marsalis Jams past school participants have included:

- Berklee College of Music
- Hialeah-Miami Lakes Senior High School (Miami, FL)
- High School for the Performing and Visual Arts (Houston, TX)
- Miami Norland Senior High School (Miami, FL)
- Moores School of Music, University of Texas
- Peabody Institute of Johns Hopkins University
- Eisenhower Auditorium of the Pennsylvania State University
- Saenger Theatre
- Sherwood High School (Sandy Spring, MD)
- Smith College
- SUNY Plattsburgh
- Texas Southern University
- University of New Hampshire
- Williams College

Artist presenters have included the ensembles of David Sánchez, Miguel Zenón and the late James Williams.
