= Random Abstract =

Studio album by Branford Marsalis
- Released: 1988
- Recorded: August 12–13, 1987
- Studio: Sound City Studios (Tokyo, Japan): Mission Control (Westford, Massachusetts, US)
- Genre: Jazz
- Length: 74:10
- Label: CBS/Sony
- Producer: Delfeayo Marsalis

Branford Marsalis chronology
| Renaissance (1987) | Random Abstract (1988) | Trio Jeepy (1989) |

Professional ratings
Review scores
| Source | Rating |
|---|---|
| AllMusic | 4.5/5 stars |
| The Penguin Guide to Jazz Recordings | 3.5/4 stars |

Random Abstract is a jazz album by saxophonist Branford Marsalis recorded August 12–13, 1987, at Sound City Studios in Tokyo, Japan. It peaked at number 6 on the Top Jazz Albums chart. It was nominated for two Grammy Awards in 1988, Best Jazz Instrumental Performance, Soloist (On a Jazz Recording) and Best Jazz Instrumental Performance, Group.

The AllMusic review by Scott Yanow states, "Branford Marsalis (on tenor and soprano) and his 1987 quartet ... stretch out on a wide repertoire during this generally fascinating set. Very much a chameleon for the date, Marsalis does close impressions of Wayne Shorter, John Coltrane, Ben Webster, Ornette Coleman, and Jan Garbarek. This is one of Branford Marsalis' most interesting (and somewhat unusual) recordings."

== Track listing ==
1. "Yes and No" (Wayne Shorter) - 6:46
2. "Crescent City" (Branford Marsalis) - 11:05
3. "Broadway Fools" (Branford Marsalis) - 9;56
4. "Lonjellis" (Kenny Kirkland) - 8:13
5. "I Thought About You" (Johnny Mercer, Jimmy Van Heusen) - 5:42
6. "Lonely Woman" (Ornette Coleman) - 16:25
7. "Steep's Theme" (Branford Marsalis) - 0:34
8. "Yesterdays" (Jerome Kern, Otto Harbach) - 11:03
9. "Crepuscule with Nellie" (Thelonious Monk) - 4:20

Tracks 8 & 9 on CD only.

== Personnel ==
- Branford Marsalis – tenor saxophone, soprano saxophone
- Kenny Kirkland – grand piano
- Lewis Nash – drums
- Delbert Felix – bass

=== Production ===
- George Butler – executive producer
- Delfeayo Marsalis – producer, editing, liner notes
- Tomoo Suzuki – engineer
- Hitoshi Endo – second engineer
- Yoshimitsu Kubota – assistant engineer
- Patrick Smith – mixing
- William McNeil – mix assistant
- Bernie Grundman – mastering at Bernie Grundman Mastering (Hollywood, California)
- Takayuki Yamaguchi – piano tuning and technician
- Arnold Levine – art direction
- Ruth Martin – cover artwork
- Jon Kabira – logistics coordinator, translation
- Riko Hayakawa – logistics coordinator, translation
