= Eric Revis =

American jazz bassist and composer (born 1967)

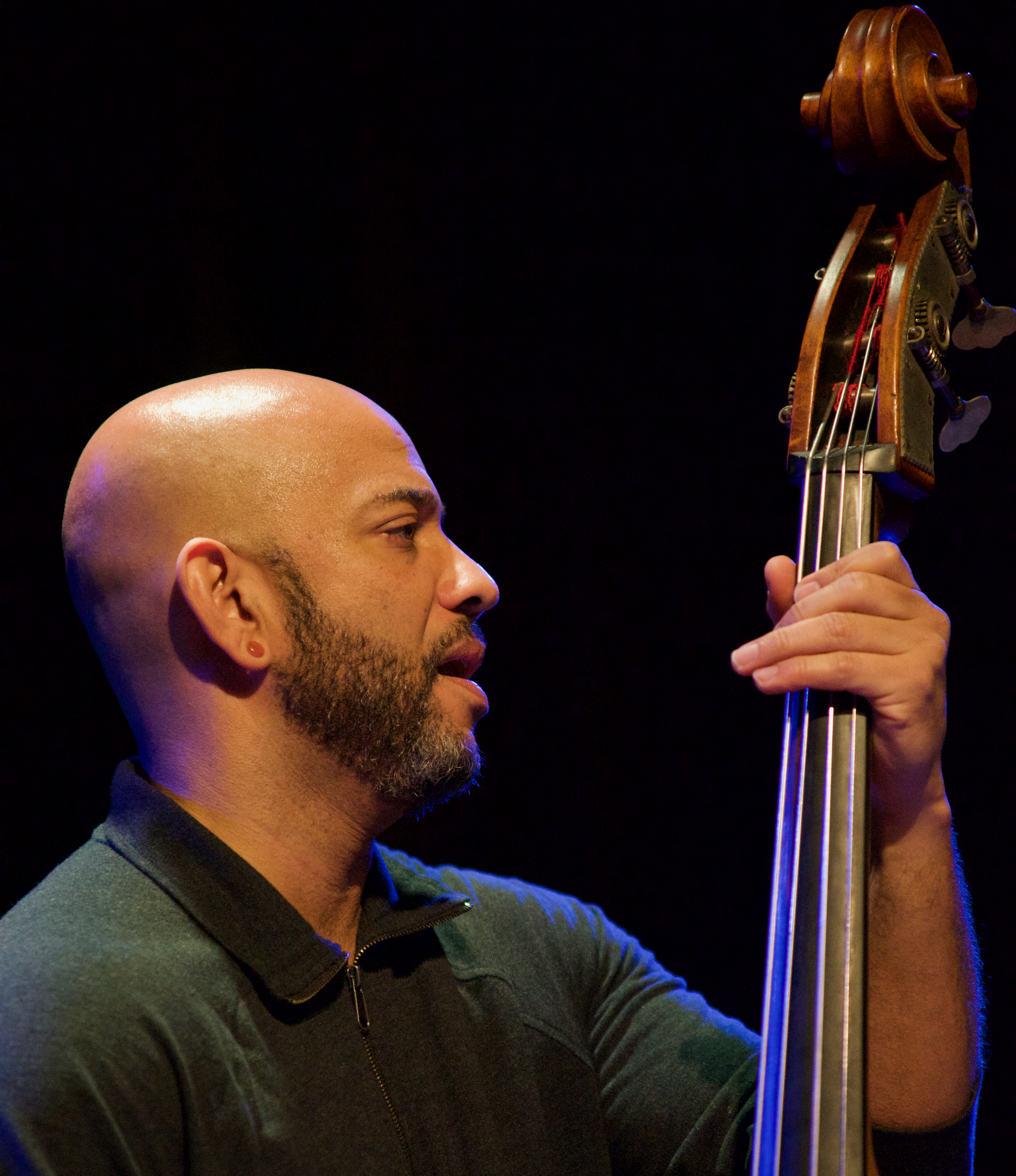
- Revis in 2018

Background information
- Born: Eric Sebastian Revis; May 31, 1967 (age 59); Los Angeles, California, U.S.
- Genre: Jazz
- Occupations: Musician; composer
- Instrument: Double bass
- Years active: 1990s–present
- Labels: 11:11; Clean Feed; Pyroclastic
- Website: www.ericrevis.com

Eric Sebastian Revis (born May 31, 1967) is a jazz bassist and composer. He came to prominence with the singer Betty Carter in the mid-1990s, and, since 1997, he has been a member of Branford Marsalis's ensemble.

== Discography ==
=== As leader ===
- Tales of the Stuttering Mime (11:11, 2004)
- Laughter's Necklace of Tears (11:11, 2009)
- Parallax (Clean Feed, 2012)
- City of Asylum (Clean Feed, 2013)
- In Memory of Things Yet Seen (Clean Feed, 2014)
- Crowded Solitudes (Clean Feed, 2016)
- Sing Me Some Cry (Clean Feed, 2017)
- Slipknots Through a Looking Glass (Pyroclastic, 2020)

With Tarbaby

- Tarbaby (Imani, 2009)
- The End of Fear (Posi-Tone, 2010)
- Ballad of Sam Langford (Hipnotic, 2013)
- Fanon (RogueArt, 2013)
- Dance of the Evil Toys (Clean Feed, 2022)
- You Think This America (Giant Step Arts, 2024)

=== As sideman ===
With J. D. Allen

- In Search of (Red, 1999)
- Pharoah's Children (Criss Cross, 2001)

With Orrin Evans

- Blessed Ones (Criss Cross, 2001)
- Meant to Shine (Palmetto, 2002)
- Easy Now (Criss Cross, 2005)
- ...It Was Beauty (Criss Cross, 2013)
- The Intangible Between (Smoke Sessions, 2020)

With Avram Fefer

- Calling All Spirits (Cadence, 2001)
- Ritual (Clean Feed, 2009)
- Eliyahu (Not Two, 2011)
- Testament (Clean Feed, 2019)

With Russell Gunn

- Gunn Fu (HighNote, 1997)
- Young Gunn Plus (32 Jazz, 1998)
- Love Requiem (HighNote, 1999)
- SmokinGunn (HighNote, 2000)
- Blue on the D.L. (HighNote, 2002)

With Branford Marsalis

- Music Evolution (Columbia, 1997) – as Buckshot LeFonque
- Requiem (Columbia, 1999)
- Contemporary Jazz (Columbia, 2000)
- Footsteps of Our Fathers (Marsalis Music / Rounder, 2002)
- Romare Bearden Revealed (Marsalis Music / Rounder, 2003)
- Branford Marsalis Quartet, Coltrane's Love Supreme Live in Amsterdam (Marsalis Music / Rounder, 2004)[CD, DVD]
- Eternal (Rounder, 2004)
- Braggtown (Marsalis Music / Rounder, 2006)
- Classic (Sony, 2008)
- American Spectrum (BIS, 2009)
- Metamorphosen (Marsalis Music, 2009)
- Four MFs Playin' Tunes (Marsalis Music, 2012)
- Upward Spiral (Marsalis Music, 2016)
- The Secret Between the Shadow and the Soul (Marsalis Music, 2019)

With Armen Nalbandian

- Quiet as It's Kept (Blacksmith Brother, 2011)
- Fire Sign (Blacksmith Brother, 2018)
- Orbits (Blacksmith Brother, 2018)
- Live in Little Tokyo (Blacksmith Brother, 2018)
- V (Blacksmith Brother, 2018)
- The Holy Ghost (Blacksmith Brother, 2018)
- Live on Sunset (Blacksmith Brother, 2019)
- Ghosts (Blacksmith Brother, 2019)

With Ralph Peterson Jr.

- The Art of War (Criss Cross, 2001)
- Subliminal Seduction (Criss Cross, 2002)
- Tests of Time (Criss Cross, 2003)

With others

- Avishai Cohen, Into the Silence (ECM, 2016)
- Steve Coleman, Weaving Symbolics (Label Bleu, 2006)
- Kat Edmonson, Take to the Sky (Convivium, 2009)
- Winard Harper, Trap Dancer (Savant, 1998)
- Winard Harper, Winard (Savant, 1999)
- Sherman Irby, Full Circle (Blue Note, 1997)
- James Hurt, Dark Grooves, Mystical Rhythms (Blue Note, 1999)
- David Kikoski, Mostly Standards (Criss Cross, 2009)
- Victor Lewis, Red Stars (Red, 2004)
- Michael Marcus, The Magic Door (Not Two, 2007)
- Delfeayo Marsalis, Minions Domain (Troubadour Jass, 2006)
- Frank McComb, Love Stories (Columbia, 2000)
- Bill McHenry, La Peur Du Vide (Sunnyside, 2012)
- Bill McHenry, Ben Entrada La Nit (Fresh Sound, 2018)
- Raul Midón, State of Mind (Manhattan, 2005)
- Kurt Rosenwinkel, Reflections (Wommusic, 2009)
- Kurt Rosenwinkel, Star of Jupiter (Wommusic, 2012)
- J. D. Walter, One Step Away (JWAL, 2013)
- Jeff "Tain" Watts, Detained at the Blue Note (Half Note, 2004)
