= Eternal (Branford Marsalis album) =

Studio album by Branford Marsalis
- Released: September 14, 2004
- Recorded: October 7–10, 2003
- Genre: Jazz
- Label: Marsalis Music

Branford Marsalis chronology
Romare Bearden Revealed (2003)	Eternal (2004)	A Love Supreme Live (2005)

Professional ratings
Review scores
Source	Rating
Allmusic	4.5/5 stars
The Penguin Guide to Jazz Recordings	3/4 stars

Eternal is an album by saxophonist Branford Marsalis recorded at Tarrytown Music Hall, Tarrytown, New York in October 2003. It peaked at number 9 on the Top Jazz Albums chart.

The Allmusic review by Matt Collar states, "Eternal finds saxophonist Branford Marsalis in a contemplative mood performing a mix of original and standard ballads... dedicated in memory to a list of people one can only assume were as influential musically on Marsalis as emotionally. Among them are bassist Malachi Favors, drummer Elvin Jones, saxophonist Steve Lacy, and the one and only Ray Charles. Their spirits are palpable here as Marsalis and his band have clearly documented a handful of quietly beautiful and deeply moving performances".

== Track listing ==
1. "The Ruby and the Pearl" (Ray Evans, Jay Livingston) - 8:52
2. "Reika's Loss" (Jeff "Tain" Watts) - 7:51
3. "Gloomy Sunday" (László Jávor, Sam M. Lewis, Rezso Seress) - 12:43
4. "The Lonely Swan" (Joey Calderazzo) - 9:04
5. "Dinner for One Please, James" (Michael Carr) - 8:00
6. "Muldoon" (Eric Revis) - 4:13
7. "Eternal" (Marsalis) - 17:41
- Recorded at Tarrytown Music Hall, Tarrytown, New York on October 7–10, 2003

== Personnel ==
- Branford Marsalis - saxophones
- Joey Calderazzo - piano
- Eric Revis - bass
- Jeff "Tain" Watts - drums
