= The Dark Keys =

Studio album by Branford Marsalis
- Released: October 1996
- Recorded: July & August 1996
- Genre: Jazz
- Length: 55:29
- Label: Sony
- Producer: Delfeayo Marsalis

Branford Marsalis chronology
Loved Ones (1996)	The Dark Keys (1996)	Music Evolution (1997)

Professional ratings
Review scores
Source	Rating
AllMusic	3/5 stars
Entertainment Weekly	A−
The Penguin Guide to Jazz Recordings	3.5/4 stars

The Dark Keys is a jazz trio album by the Branford Marsalis Trio, featuring Branford Marsalis, Reginald Veal, and Jeff "Tain" Watts, with guest appearances from Kenny Garrett and Joe Lovano. Recorded July 31 to August 2, 1996, in the Tarrytown Music Hall in Tarrytown, New York, the album reached Number 9 on the Billboard Top Jazz Albums chart.

== Reception ==
In his AllMusic review, Leo Stanley wrote that the performance "pushes at the borders of post-bop, adding elements of hip-hop and rock & roll, making for an adventurous and exciting listen." Steve Futterman concurred in his Entertainment Weekly review, noting that the album shows Marsalis returning "to contender status." Writing in 2009 in The New York Times, Ben Ratliff called the album one of the landmarks of the saxophone trio album tradition over the last 50 years.

== Track listing ==
All tracks are written by Branford Marsalis, except where indicated.

No.	Title	Length
1.	"The Dark Keys"	10:42
2.	"Hesitation" (Wynton Marsalis)	5:58
3.	"A Thousand Autumns"	6:20
4.	"Sentinel"	8:49
5.	"Lykeif"	6:04
6.	"Judas Iscariot" (Delfeayo Marsalis)	7:48
7.	"Blutain" (Jeff "Tain" Watts)	7:36
8.	"Schott Happens"	8:16

== Personnel ==
- Branford Marsalis – Saxophones
- Reginald Veal, bass
- Jeff "Tain" Watts, drums
- Kenny Garrett, alto saxophone (on "Judas Iscariot")
- Joe Lovano, tenor saxophone (on "Sentinel")
