= Footsteps of Our Fathers =

Studio album by Branford Marsalis Quartet
- Released: August 2002
- Recorded: December 2001
- Studio: Bearsville (Woodstock, New York)
- Genre: Jazz
- Length: 69:28
- Label: Marsalis Music
- Producer: Branford Marsalis

Branford Marsalis Quartet chronology
Contemporary Jazz (2000)	Footsteps of Our Fathers (2002)	Romare Bearden Revealed (2003)

Professional ratings
Review scores
Source	Rating
AllMusic	3.5/5 stars
The Guardian	4/5 stars
Los Angeles Times	3.5/5 stars
The Penguin Guide to Jazz Recordings	2.5/4 stars

Footsteps of Our Fathers is a jazz album by the Branford Marsalis Quartet, featuring Branford Marsalis, Eric Revis, Jeff "Tain" Watts, and Joey Calderazzo, which was recorded December 1–3, 2001 at Bearsville Studios in Woodstock, New York. Marsalis's first recording for his new label Marsalis Music after 18 years on Sony Music, the album features the quartet's recording of four significant works of jazz from the years 1955 to 1964, including works by Ornette Coleman, Sonny Rollins (The Freedom Suite), John Coltrane (A Love Supreme), and the Modern Jazz Quartet.

== Reception ==
The album peaked at number 4 on the Billboard Top Jazz Albums chart.

John Fordham, reviewing the album in The Guardian, writes that "The pieces are all postwar jazz standards … but the band handles it all as if it were metal to be melted down and refashioned, not fine china to be merely dusted over." Writing for AllAboutJazz.com, Dan McClenaghan calls the album "the first great Branford Marsalis album since 96's The Dark Keys." Nate Chinen, in his JazzTimes review, says that the listening experience is "disconcerting to hear these opuses revisited so faithfully-all the more so because Marsalis, despite obvious burdens of influence, somehow manages to claim them as his own. ... throughout the disc, Marsalis explores the sharp-cornered abandon that has always distinguished his playing- and it seems more focused on Footsteps than on all but his best prior efforts." And writing in JazzReview, Samira Blackwell says, "The repertory might have some years on it, but the playing does not suffer at all and provides a phenomenal vehicle for Marsalis’s indomitable personality. … Marsalis manages to give the listener déjà vu chills at times, yet puts his personal sound on the music. This tightrope walking could go badly very easily, but Branford pulls it off with a style that eclipses his previously recorded CDs." Lastly, in the Los Angeles Times, Howard Reich says that "Marsalis is not simply retracing the steps of two acknowledged masterpieces. On the contrary, he offers a decidedly fresh perspective on these milestones, attaining profound balladry in certain passages of 'Freedom,' and ferocious energy and a searing intensity in the climactic sections of 'Supreme.'"

== Track listing ==
No.	Title	Length
1.	"Giggin'" (Ornette Coleman)	7:20
2.	"The Freedom Suite: Movement I" (Sonny Rollins)	6:05
3.	"The Freedom Suite: Interlude" (Sonny Rollins)	0:59
4.	"The Freedom Suite: Movement II" (Sonny Rollins)	8:19
5.	"The Freedom Suite: Movement III" (Sonny Rollins)	7:33
6.	"A Love Supreme Pt 1: Acknowledgment" (John Coltrane)	7:11
7.	"A Love Supreme Pt 2: Resolution" (John Coltrane)	12:37
8.	"A Love Supreme Pt 3: Pursuance" (John Coltrane)	8:10
9.	"A Love Supreme Pt 4: Psalm" (John Coltrane)	4:18
10.	"Concorde" (John Lewis)	5:01

== Personnel ==
- Branford Marsalis – saxophones
- Eric Revis, bass
- Jeff "Tain" Watts, drums
- Joey Calderazzo, piano
