= Amanecer (Joey Calderazzo album) =

Studio album by Joey Calderazzo
- Released: 2007
- Recorded: January–February 2006
- Genre: Jazz
- Label: Marsalis Music

Amanecer is an album by Joey Calderazzo. It was recorded in 2006 and released by Marsalis Music.

== Recording and music ==
The album was recorded in January and February 2006. Most of the nine tracks are played by Calderazzo alone on piano. He is joined by guitarist Romero Lubambo for "The Lonely Swan", and by vocalist Claudia Acuña for "So Many Moons". All three play on "Amanecer" and "Lara".

== Release and reception ==
Professional ratings
Review scores
| Source | Rating |
|---|---|
| AllMusic | 4.5/5 stars |
| The Penguin Guide to Jazz | 3/4 stars |

Amanecer was released by Marsalis Music in 2007. The AllMusic reviewer wrote that "Every selection on this well-conceived project has its purpose and is memorable in its own way." The Penguin Guide to Jazz suggested that the presence of Lubambo and Acuña merely diluted the effect of what is otherwise a solo piano album. The JazzTimes wrote that it "might be the album that gets his gifts as both a composer and a solo pianist embraced on a greater scale."

== Track listing ==
1. "Midnight Voyage"
2. "Sea Glass"
3. "Toonay"
4. "Amanecer"
5. "The Lonely Swan"
6. "I've Never Been in Love Before"
7. "So Many Moons"
8. "Waltz for Debby"
9. "Lara"

== Personnel ==
- Joey Calderazzo – piano
- Romero Lubambo – guitar (tracks 4, 5, 9)
- Claudia Acuña – vocals (tracks 4, 7, 9)
