= Joey Calderazzo =

American jazz pianist (born 1965)

- Born: Joseph Dominick Calderazzo; February 27, 1965 (age 61); New Rochelle, New York, U.S.
- Genre: Jazz
- Occupation: Musician
- Instrument: Piano
- Years active: 1979–Present
- Labels: Blue Note; Marsalis Music; Sunnyside
- Education: Berklee College of Music; Manhattan School of Music
- Website: www.joeycalderazzo.com

Joseph Dominick Calderazzo (February 27, 1965) is an American jazz pianist. He played extensively in bands led by Michael Brecker and Branford Marsalis and has also led his own bands. His brother is the jazz drummer Gene Calderazzo.

== Early life ==
Calderazzo was born in New Rochelle, New York. He began studying classical piano at age eight. His brother, Gene, got him interested in jazz. He studied with Richie Beirach and, in the 1980s, continued his studies at the Berklee College of Music and the Manhattan School of Music. At the same time, he was playing professionally with Dave Liebman and Frank Foster.

== Later life and career ==
At a music clinic, he met saxophonist Michael Brecker, becoming a member of his quintet beginning in 1987. In 1990, he signed with Blue Note Records. Brecker produced Calderazzo's first album, In the Door, which featured Jerry Bergonzi and Branford Marsalis, his brother's roommate in Boston. They played on Calderazzo's second album, To Know One, which included Dave Holland and Jack DeJohnette.

Calderazzo appeared on Brecker's albums Tales from the Hudson and Two Blocks from the Edge as pianist and composer. He played keyboard in Marsalis's Buckshot LeFonque band, contributing to their album Music Evolution. When pianist Kenny Kirkland died in 1998, Calderazzo assumed his place in the Branford Marsalis Quartet. In 1999, he recorded the self-titled Joey Calderazzo with John Patitucci and Jeff "Tain" Watts. He played on Marsalis's albums Contemporary Jazz, Footsteps of Our Fathers, Romare Bearden Revealed, Eternal, and on the DVD Coltrane's A Love Supreme Live in Amsterdam. Calderazzo's composition "Hope" appears on Marsalis's Braggtown.

He was one of the first musicians to sign with Marsalis Music, owned by Branford Marsalis. Haiku, his first solo album, appeared in 2002. His album Amanecer featured the singer Claudia Acuña and guitarist Romero Lubambo. In 2011, he and Marsalis formed a duo and recorded Songs of Mirth and Melancholy.

Calderazzo developed cubital tunnel syndrome in 2017, resulting in numbness in two fingers of his right hand. Following surgery and rest, he was able to return to playing as before.

== Discography ==
=== As leader/co-leader ===
Main source:

Year recorded	Title	Label	Personnel/Notes
1990	In the Door	Blue Note	With Branford Marsalis (soprano saxophone, tenor saxophone), Jerry Bergonzi and Michael Brecker (tenor saxophone), Jay Anderson (bass), Peter Erskine and Adam Nussbaum (drums), Don Alias (percussion)
1991	To Know One	Blue Note	With Branford Marsalis (soprano saxophone, tenor saxophone), Jerry Bergonzi (tenor saxophone), Dave Holland (bass), Jack DeJohnette (drums)
1993?	The Traveler	Blue Note	Trio, with John Patitucci and Jay Anderson (bass, separately), Peter Erskine and Jeff Hirshfield (drums, separately)
1995?	Secrets	AudioQuest	With various, from trio to octet
1996?	Our Standards	Gowi	
1997?	Simply Music	Lost Chart	Trio, with Sylvain Gagnon (bass), Jeff "Tain" Watts (drums)
1999	Joey Calderazzo	Columbia / Sony Music	Trio, with John Patitucci (bass), Jeff "Tain" Watts (drums)
2002	Haiku	Marsalis Music	Solo piano
2006	Amanecer	Marsalis Music	Most tracks solo piano; one track duo with Romero Lubambo (guitar); one track duo with Claudia Acuña (vocals); two tracks trio, with Lubambo and Acuña
2011?	Songs of Mirth & Melancholy	EmArcy / Marsalis Music	Duo, co-led with Branford Marsalis (saxohones)
2011	Live	Sunnyside	Trio, with Orlando le Fleming (bass), Donald Edwards (drums); in concert
2015?	Going Home	Sunnyside	One track piano solo; most tracks trio, with Orlando le Fleming (bass), Adam Cruz (drums); one track quartet, with Branford Marsalis (tenor saxophone) added
2017	Live from the Cotton Club, Tokyo, Volume I	Dot Time	Trio, with Orlando le Fleming (bass), Donald Edwards (drums); in concert

=== As sideman ===
Year recorded	Leader	Title	Label
1988	Michael Brecker	Don’t Try This at Home	Impulse!
1989	Rick Margitza	Color	Blue Note
1990	Michael Brecker	Now You See It… (Now You Don't)	GRP
1991	Rick Margitza	Hope	Blue Note
1991	Rick Margitza	This Is New	Blue Note
1996	Jerry Bergonzi	Fast Company	Blue Jackel
1996	Michael Brecker	Tales from the Hudson	Impulse!
1998	Michael Brecker	Two Blocks from the Edge	Impulse!
2000	Branford Marsalis	Contemporary Jazz	Sony Music
2000	Rick Margitza	Heart of Hearts	Palmetto
2002	Branford Marsalis	Footsteps of Our Fathers	Marsalis Music
2001	Richard Cole	The Forgotten	Origin
2001–2002	Jeff "Tain" Watts	Bar Talk	Columbia
2003	Branford Marsalis	Romare Bearden Revealed	Marsalis Music
2004	Branford Marsalis	A Love Supreme: Live in Amsterdam	Marsalis Music
2004	Branford Marsalis	Eternal	Marsalis Music
2006	Branford Marsalis Quartet	Braggtown	Rounder Records
2009	Branford Marsalis Quartet	Metamophosen	Marsalis Music
2010	Hakan Brostrom	Refraction	Art of Life
2010	The Transform Quintet	Another Child	NaRator
2011	Branford Marsalis Quartet	Four MFs Playin' Tunes	Marsalis Music
2016	Branford Marsalis Quartet	Upward Spiral	Music on Vinyl
2018?	Kurt Elling	The Questions	OKeh
2019	Branford Marsalis Quartet	The Secret Between the Shadow and the Soul	Marsalis Music
2025	Branford Marsalis Quartet	Belonging	Blue Note
