= Contemporary Jazz (Branford Marsalis album) =

Studio album by Branford Marsalis Quartet
- Released: August 2000
- Recorded: December 1999
- Studio: Bearsville (Woodstock, New York)
- Genre: Jazz
- Length: 73:50
- Label: Sony Music
- Producer: Branford Marsalis, Rob "Wacko" Hunter

Branford Marsalis Quartet chronology
| Requiem (1999) | Contemporary Jazz (2000) | Footsteps of Our Fathers (2002) |

Professional ratings
Review scores
| Source | Rating |
|---|---|
| AllMusic | 4/5 stars |
| The Penguin Guide to Jazz Recordings | 3/4 stars |

Contemporary Jazz is a jazz album by the Branford Marsalis Quartet, featuring Branford Marsalis, Eric Revis, Jeff "Tain" Watts, and Joey Calderazzo, which was recorded on December 1–4, 1999 at Bearsville Sound Studios near Woodstock, New York.

== Reception ==
The album received the Grammy Award for Best Instrumental Jazz Performance, Individual or Group in 2000 and reached Number 12 on the Billboard Top Jazz Albums chart.

In his AllMusic review, David R. Adler calls the album "a knockout," saying the quartet "deftly [executes] a dizzying series of tempo shifts and subtle cues, all seamlessly worked into a fabric of extended, burning improvisation." Writing in JazzTimes, Willard Jenkins says that Marsalis "shows clear evidence that he's far from satisfied in his quest for excellence on his horns and with his composer's pen. Writing with an exceptional sense of rhythm in particular, Marsalis churns out an eight-chapter gem…" The BBC's ClassicalMusic.com called the album "packed with hard-driving, punchy, turn-on-a-dime quartet music, vigorously interactive and razor-sharp, yet pleasingly informal…hard-swinging, occasionally volcanic performances from a quartet at the peak of its powers."

== Track listing ==
All tracks are written by Branford Marsalis, except where indicated.

| No. | Title | Length |
|---|---|---|
| 1. | "In the Crease" | 6:46 |
| 2. | "Requiem" | 10:24 |
| 3. | "Elysium" | 15:58 |
| 4. | "Cheek to Cheek" (Irving Berlin) | 8:46 |
| 5. | "Tain Mutiny" | 8:21 |
| 6. | "Ayanna" (Eric Revis) | 6:01 |
| 7. | "Countronious Rex" (Jeff "Tain" Watts) | 8:54 |

== Personnel ==
- Branford Marsalis – Saxophones
- Eric Revis, bass
- Jeff "Tain" Watts, drums
- Joey Calderazzo, piano
