= Claudia Acuña =

Chilean vocalist, songwriter, and arranger

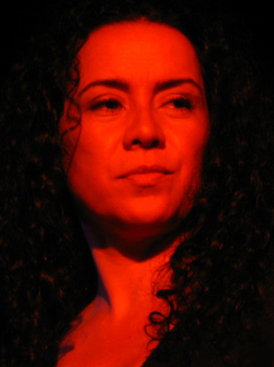
- Acuña in 2008

Background information
- Born: July 31, 1971 (age 55); Santiago, Chile
- Genres: Jazz, Latin
- Occupation: Singer
- Years active: 1991–present
- Labels: Verve, Marsalis Music, Maxjazz
- Website: claudiaacunamusic.com

Claudia Acuña (July 31, 1971, Santiago) is a Chilean jazz vocalist, songwriter, and arranger.

== Biography ==
Born July 3, 1971, in Santiago and raised in Concepcion, she was inspired as a child to perform a variety of music, including folk, pop and opera, by Victor Jara and Violeta Parra. Her attention turned to American popular music and jazz at the age of 15, when she first heard Frank Sinatra, Erroll Garner and Sarah Vaughan. Returning to Santiago in 1991, she quickly gained prominence on the local jazz scene through live performances and radio broadcasts with visiting artists.

In 1995, Acuña moved to New York City and began performing at jam sessions and clubs including the Zinc Bar and Smalls. She also performed with her own band at the famous Jazz Gallery. Among the many musical associates she met in this period was pianist/composer Jason Lindner, who became and has remained her musical director.

Her debut album, Wind from the South, was released in 1999 on Verve Records, followed by Rhythm of Life in 2001 and Luna in 2004. Acuña's first recording on the Marsalis Music label, En Este Momento, was released in 2009. She has also been featured on various recordings with Peck Allmond, George Benson, Joey Calderazzo, Avishai Cohen, Mark Elf, Tom Harrell, Antonio Hart, Arturo O'Farrill, Danilo Pérez and Guillermo Klein.

Acuña has been named co-curator of a Chilean music festival that took place in January 2009. She is also the spokesperson for World Vision Chile, an international Christian relief and development organization that specializes in child-focused development programs. One of Acuña's covers of the Antonio Carlos Jobim song "Suddenly" was featured on the original motion picture soundtrack from Verve Records for the movie Bossa Nova. In 2001 she recorded a single with House producers MKL and Soy Sos of 3 Generations Walking called "Slavery Days" which gained her substantial exposure outside of the jazz medium. Claudia is signed to the Cambridge, Massachusetts–based record label Marsalis Music.

== Discography ==
=== As leader ===
- Wind from the South (Verve, 2000)
- Rhythm of Life (Verve, 2002)
- Luna (Maxjazz, 2004)
- En Este Momento (Marsalis Music, 2009)
- Kalimba Collage with Kenny Wollesen (Soniculture, 2009)
- Turning Pages (Plaza, 2019)
- Duo (Ropeadope, 2022)
- Ave de Luz (Delfin Records, 2026)

=== As guest ===
- Avishai Cohen, Adama (Stretch, 1998)
- Guillermo Klein, Los Guachos II (Sunnyside, 1999)
- Avishai Cohen, Colors (Stretch, 2000)
- George Benson, Absolute Benson (Verve, 2000)
- Danilo Pérez, Motherland (Verve, 2000)
- Tom Harrell, Wise Children (Bluebird/Arista, 2003)
- Little Louie Vega, Elements of Life (Cutting Edge, 2003)
- David Gilmore, Unified Presence (RKM Music, 2006)
- Joey Calderazzo, Amanecer (Marsalis Music, 2007)
- Billy Childs, Rebirth (Mack Avenue, 2017)
- Willie Jones III, The Next Phase (WJ3, 2009)
- Jason Lindner, Now vs Now (Anzic, 2009)
- Fabrizio Sotti, Inner Dance (E1/Sotti Entertainment, 2010)
- David Gilmore, Numerology:Live at Jazz Standard (Evolutionary Music, 2012)
- Fabrizio Sotti, Right Now (Red River Entertainment, 2013)
- Susie Ibarra, Perception (Decibel Collective, 2018)
