= Branford Marsalis =

American saxophonist (born 1960)

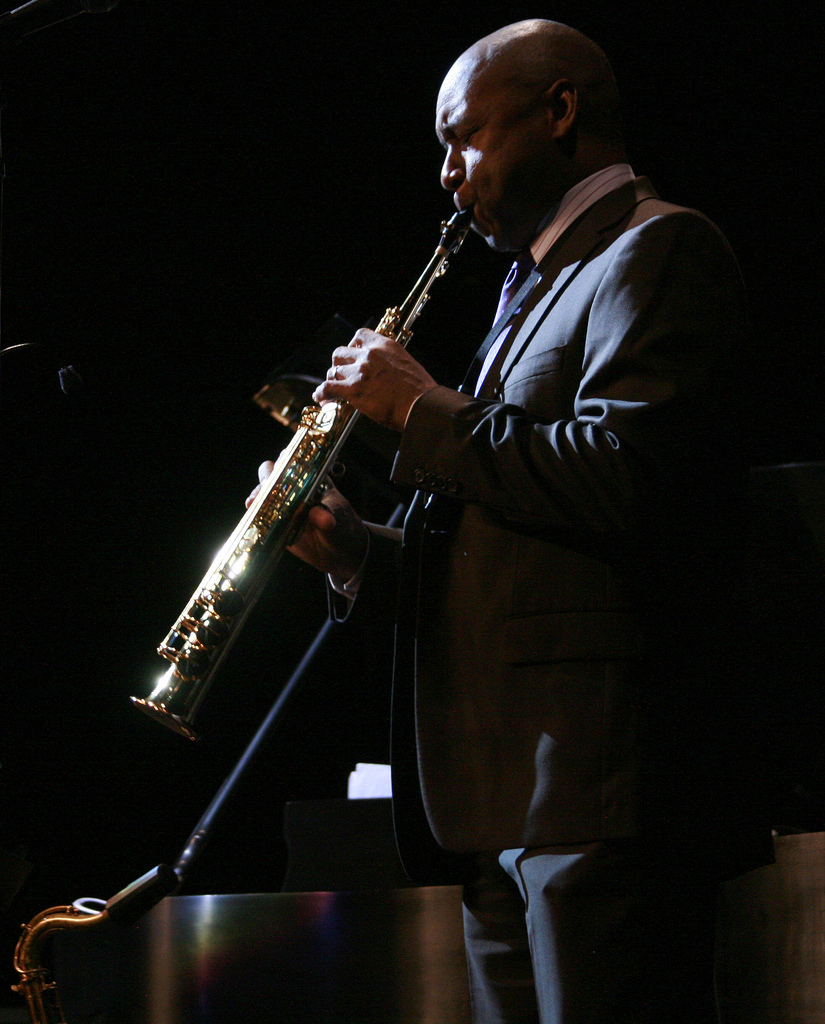
- Marsalis performing in 2011

Background information
- Born: August 26, 1960 (age 66); Breaux Bridge, Louisiana, U.S.
- Genre: Jazz
- Occupation: Musician
- Instruments: Soprano saxophone; tenor saxophone; alto saxophone
- Years active: 1980–present
- Labels: Columbia; CBS; Marsalis Music; Blue Note
- Formerly of: The Tonight Show Band
- Website: branfordmarsalis.com
- Parent(s): Dolores Ferdinand Marsalis and Ellis Marsalis Jr.
- Relatives: Ellis Marsalis Sr. (grandfather); Wynton Marsalis, Jason Marsalis and Delfeayo Marsalis (brothers)

Branford Marsalis (born August 26, 1960) is an American saxophonist, composer, and bandleader. While primarily known for his work in jazz as the leader of the Branford Marsalis Quartet, he also performs frequently as a soloist with classical ensembles and has led the group Buckshot LeFonque. From 1992 to 1995 he led The Tonight Show Band.

== Early life ==
Marsalis was born on August 26, 1960, in New Orleans. He is the son of Dolores (née Ferdinand), a jazz singer and substitute teacher, and Ellis Louis Marsalis, Jr., a pianist and music professor. His brothers Jason Marsalis, Wynton Marsalis, and Delfeayo Marsalis are also jazz musicians.

== Career ==
=== Musical beginnings: 1980–1985 ===
While in high school, Marsalis played in a R&B cover band called The Creators.

Marsalis then attended Southern University, a historically black college in Baton Rouge, where he studied under renowned jazz clarinetist Alvin Batiste. At the encouragement of Batiste, Marsalis later transferred to Berklee College of Music in Boston. While a student at Berklee, he toured Europe playing alto and tenor saxophone in a large ensemble led by drummer Art Blakey. Other big band experiences with Lionel Hampton and Clark Terry followed over the next year, and by the end of 1981 Marsalis, on alto saxophone, had joined his brother Wynton in Blakey's Jazz Messengers. Other performances with his brother, including a 1981 Japanese tour with Herbie Hancock, led to the formation of his brother Wynton's first quintet, where Marsalis shifted his emphasis to soprano and tenor saxophones. He continued to work with Wynton until 1985, a period that also saw the release of his own first recording, Scenes in the City, as well as guest appearances with other artists including Miles Davis and Dizzy Gillespie.

=== Expanded output: 1985–1995 ===
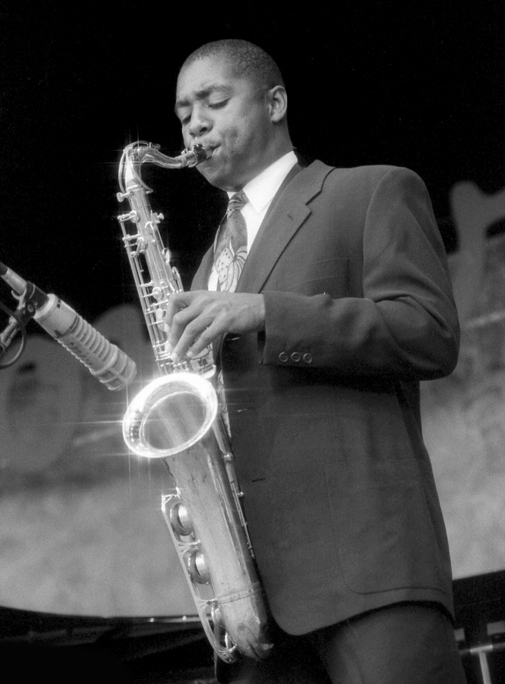
Marsalis at the Monterey Jazz Festival, 1992

In 1985, he joined Sting, singer and bassist of rock band the Police, on his first solo project, The Dream of the Blue Turtles, alongside jazz and session musicians Omar Hakim on drums, Darryl Jones on the bass, and Kenny Kirkland on keyboards. He performed with Sting at Live Aid and became a regular in his line-up both in the studio and live performances until the release of Brand New Day in 1999.

In 1986, Marsalis formed the Branford Marsalis Quartet with pianist Kenny Kirkland, drummer Jeff "Tain" Watts, and bass player Robert Hurst. That year, they released their first album, Royal Garden Blues. That lineup of the quartet would go on to release four more albums, the last of which, I Heard You Twice the First Time (1992), won the Grammy Award for Best Instrumental Jazz Album, Individual or Group.

In 1988, Marsalis co-starred in the Spike Lee film School Daze, also rendering several horn-blowing interludes for the music in the film. His witty comments have pegged him to many memorable one-liners in the film. In 1989, Marsalis played a 30-second cover of "Lift Every Voice and Sing" over the opening logos of Lee's film Do the Right Thing.

Between 1990 and 1994, Marsalis played with the Grateful Dead numerous times, appearing on their 1990 live album Without a Net. He later appeared on Wake Up to Find Out, a full release of the March 29, 1990 concert he performed in.

In 1992, Marsalis became the leader of The Tonight Show Band on the newly launched The Tonight Show with Jay Leno, after Jay Leno replaced Johnny Carson. Initially, Marsalis turned down the offer, but later reconsidered and accepted the position. He brought with him the three other members of the Branford Marsalis Quartet, who became The Tonight Show Band's pianist, drummer, and bass player.

In 1994, Marsalis formed the group Buckshot LeFonque (named after a pseudonym once used by Cannonball Adderley), a jazz group with elements of rock and hip-hop. That year, they released their first album, Buckshot LeFonque, which was mostly produced by DJ Premier.

In 1994, Marsalis appeared on the Red Hot Organization's compilation CD, Stolen Moments: Red Hot + Cool. The album, meant to raise awareness of the AIDS epidemic in African American society, was named Album of the Year by Time.

In 1995, Marsalis left The Tonight Show, having become unhappy in the role: he disliked that he was supposed to always show enthusiasm, even for jokes he thought were unfunny. He was succeeded as bandleader by guitarist Kevin Eubanks. In a well-publicized interview soon after leaving, Marsalis said: "The job of musical director I found out later was just to kiss the ass of the host, and I ain't no ass kisser." He also complained that when he did not laugh or smile, some viewers' perception was, "Oh, he’s surly. He hates his boss." When the interviewer asked if Marsalis did hate Leno, Marsalis responded, "Oh, I despised him." He later stated that he did not hate Leno, and that this was a sarcastic response to what he considered "a ridiculous question".

=== Transition: 1995–2007 ===
In 1997, bassist Eric Revis replaced Hurst in the Branford Marsalis Quartet. Kirkland died the following year, and was replaced by pianist Joey Calderazzo. The Branford Marsalis Quartet has since toured and recorded extensively. For two decades Marsalis was associated with Columbia, where he served as creative consultant and producer for jazz recordings between 1997 and 2001, including signing saxophonist David S. Ware for two albums.

In 2002, Marsalis founded his own label, Marsalis Music. Its catalogue includes Claudia Acuña, Harry Connick Jr., Doug Wamble, Miguel Zenón, in addition to albums by members of the Marsalis family.

Marsalis has also become involved in college education, with appointments at Michigan State University (1996–2000), San Francisco State University (2000–2002), and North Carolina Central University (2005–present). After Hurricane Katrina in 2005, Marsalis and Harry Connick, Jr., working with the local Habitat for Humanity, created Musicians Village in New Orleans, with the Ellis Marsalis Center for Music the centerpiece.

=== Classical and Broadway projects: 2008–2010 ===
Under the direction of conductor Gil Jardim, Marsalis and members of the Philharmonia Brasileira toured the United States in the fall of 2008, performing works by Brazilian composer Heitor Villa-Lobos, arranged for solo saxophone and orchestra. This project commemorated the 50th Anniversary of the revered Brazilian composer's death.

Marsalis and the members of his quartet joined the North Carolina Symphony for American Spectrum, released in February 2009 by Sweden's BIS Records. The album showcases Marsalis and the orchestra performing a range of American music by Michael Daugherty, John Williams, Ned Rorem and Christopher Rouse, while being conducted by Grant Llewellyn.

In 2009 Tain left the Branford Marsalis Quartet and was replaced by Justin Faulkner.

Marsalis wrote the music for the 2010 Broadway revival of the August Wilson play Fences.

On July 14, 2010, Marsalis made his debut with the New York Philharmonic on Central Park's Great Lawn. Led by conductor Andrey Boreyko, Marsalis and the New York Philharmonic performed Glazunov's "Concerto for Alto Saxophone" and Schuloff's "Hot-Sonate for Alto Saxophone and Orchestra". Boreyko, Marsalis and the Philharmonic performed the same program again in Vail, CO later that month and four more times at Avery Fisher Hall in New York, NY, the following February.

=== 2011–present ===
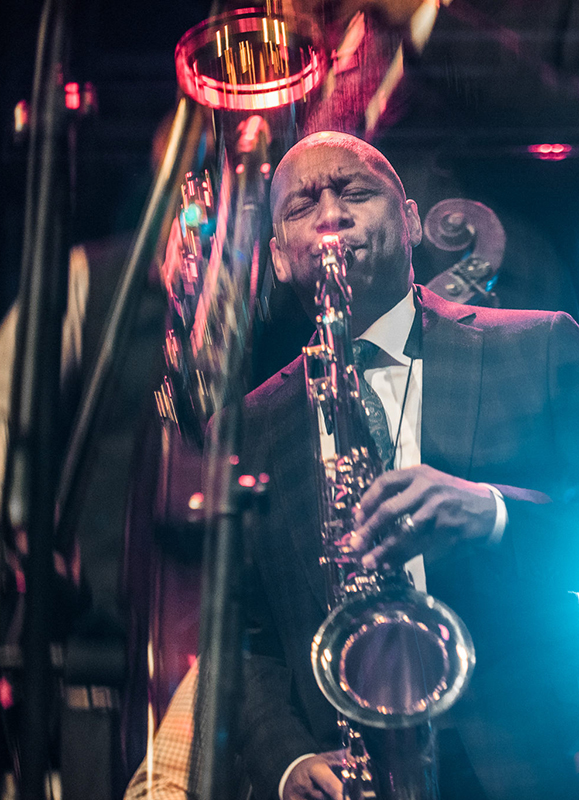
Marsalis at a concert in Bielsko-Biała, Poland, at the Lotos Jazz Festival, 2019

In June 2011, after working together for over ten years in a band setting, Marsalis and Joey Calderazzo released their first duo album titled Songs of Mirth and Melancholy, on Marsalis's label, Marsalis Music. Their first public performance was at the 2011 TD Toronto Jazz Festival.

In 2012, Marsalis released Four MFs Playin' Tunes on deluxe 180-gram high definition vinyl, prior to Record Store Day 2012 on April 21 that year. This is the first recording of the Branford Marsalis Quartet with drummer Justin Faulkner, who joined the band in 2009, and was the first vinyl release from Marsalis Music. The album was named Apple iTunes Best of 2012 Instrumental Jazz Album of the Year.

Marsalis performed "The Star-Spangled Banner" on Wednesday, September 5, 2012, at the Democratic National Convention in Charlotte.

In 2019, Marsalis released The Secret Between the Shadow and the Soul, which he recorded in Australia with his quartet. Marsalis, commenting on the longevity of his band and their approach said, ahead of the album's release: '“Staying together allows us to play adventurous, sophisticated music and sound good. Lack of familiarity leads to defensive playing, playing not to make a mistake. I like playing sophisticated music, and I couldn’t create this music with people I don’t know.”

For the 2026 Grammy Awards, he received a nomination for the album Belonging in the Best Jazz Instrumental Album category.

== Personal life ==
Marsalis lived in Durham, North Carolina, with his wife Nicole and their two daughters, before moving to New Orleans in 2024 to head the Ellis Marsalis Center for Music. He was raised Catholic.

== Awards and honors ==
- The Branford Marsalis Quartet received a Grammy Award in 2001 for their album Contemporary Jazz. He has also won two other Grammys.
- In September 2006, Branford Marsalis was awarded an Honorary Doctorate of Music from Berklee College of Music. During his acceptance ceremony, he was honored with a tribute performance featuring music throughout his career.
- Marsalis won the 2010 Drama Desk Award in the category "Outstanding Music in a Play" and was also nominated for a 2010 Tony Award in the category of "Best Original Score (Music and/or Lyrics) Written for the Theatre" for his participation in the Broadway revival of August Wilson's Fences.
- Marsalis, with his father and brothers, were group recipients of the 2011 NEA Jazz Masters Award.
- In May 2012, he received an honorary Doctor of Music degree from the University of North Carolina at Chapel Hill.
- In June 2012, Marsalis, along with friend and fellow New Orleans native Harry Connick, Jr., received the S. Roger Horchow Award for Greatest Public Service by a Private Citizen, an award given out annually by the Jefferson Awards for Public Service, for their work in the Musicians' Village of New Orleans.
- On March 26, 2013, he received the degree of Doctor of Arts Leadership, honoris causa from Saint Mary's University of Minnesota.
- In 2023, he received an honorary Doctor of Arts degree from Duke University.

== Instruments and setup ==
- Soprano: Marsalis has played a silver Selmer Mark VI with a modified bent neck, as well as a Yamaha YSS-82ZR, and uses a Selmer D mouthpiece and Vandoren V12 Clarinet reeds 5+
- Alto: Cannonball Vintage Series (model AV/LG-L) with a Selmer Classic C mouthpiece and Vandoren #5
- Tenor: Selmer Super Balanced Action with a Fred Lebayle 8 mouthpiece and Alexander Superial size 3.5 reeds

== Other appearances ==
- Marsalis performed alongside Sting and Phil Collins at the London Live Aid concert at Wembley Stadium on July 13, 1985.
- Featured as saxophonist on "Fight the Power" (1989) by Public Enemy.
- Marsalis assembled a band he called X-Men to open for the Grateful Dead at the Oakland Coliseum Arena on December 31, 1990. Other members were Kevin Eubanks, Robert Hurst, Bruce Hornsby and Jeff Watts.
- Wait Wait... Don't Tell Me! Guest on the "Not My Job" section of the show. On this performance he claimed the saxophone was the sexiest instrument, then insults the accordion. In a later episode of the show, "Weird Al" Yankovic stands up for the accordion; later guest Yo-Yo Ma claimed the saxophone was in fact the sexiest.
- Interviewed on Space Ghost Coast to Coast Episode 10: "Gum, Disease" (aired November 11, 1994). Although the Coast to Coast crew said, "He was the most pleasant, and well mannered guest we had ever interviewed", he did not sign a release for merchandising rights, so the episode could not be on the Space Ghost Coast to Coast Volume One DVD.
- Marsalis was featured in Shanice's 1992 hit "I Love Your Smile". In the second half of the song, he has a solo and Shanice says, "Blow, Branford, Blow"
- He played the role of Lester in the movie Throw Momma from the Train (1987) and the role of Jordan in Spike Lee's 1988 musical-drama film School Daze.
- Cameo as a repair man who asks Hillary on a date in the episode "Stop Will! In the Name of Love", and as himself in the episode "Sleepless in Bel-Air" on the sitcom The Fresh Prince of Bel-Air (1994).
- Interviews with Marsalis are featured prominently in the documentary Before the Music Dies (2006).
- Marsalis was a guest judge on the final episode of the fifth season of Top Chef which took place in New Orleans, Louisiana.
- On April 28 and 29, 2009, Marsalis played with the Dead (the remaining members of the Grateful Dead) at the IZOD Center in East Rutherford, New Jersey, rekindling a relationship started when he performed with them at a set at Nassau Coliseum on March 29, 1990, during which, according to Dead aficionados, one of the greatest renditions of "Eyes of the World", was performed.
- On July 21, 2010, Marsalis guested with Dave Matthews Band on the songs "Lover Lay Down," "What Would You Say" and "Jimi Thing" at the Verizon Wireless Amphitheater in Charlotte, NC. This was the first time Marsalis had guested with Dave Matthews Band, although he had previously played with Dave Matthews and Gov't Mule on a cover of Bob Dylan's "All Along the Watchtower" on December 16, 2006, in Asheville, NC. Marsalis performed with the Dave Matthews Band again on December 12, 2012, at the PNC Arena in Raleigh, NC. For the Summer 2015 tour Marsalis has returned to guest for 3 shows, May 22, 2015, in Raleigh North Carolina ("Lover Lay Down", "Typical Situation", Jimi thing), June 12, 2015 in Hartford, CT ("Death On The High Seas", "Spaceman", "Jimi Thing", "Warehouse"), and July 29, 2015, in Tampa, FL ("Lover Lay Down", "Typical Situation", "Jimi Thing").
- Marsalis appeared as a special guest of Bob Weir and Bruce Hornsby at two festivals in the summer of 2012. They first performed at the All Good Music Festival in Thornville, OH on July 19, 2012, and then headed to Bridgeport, CT for a performance at Gathering of the Vibes the following day, July 20, 2012.
- Marsalis appeared as a special guest of Furthur for their performance at Red Rocks on September 21, 2013.
- Marsalis appeared as a special guest of Dead & Company for their second night of a two night headlining performance at Lock'n Festival on August 26, 2018.

== Discography ==
=== As leader/co-leader ===
- Fathers & Sons with Wynton Marsalis, Ellis Marsalis, Chico Freeman, Von Freeman (Columbia, 1982)
- Scenes in the City (Columbia, 1984)
- Romances for Saxophone (CBS Masterworks, 1986)
- Royal Garden Blues (CBS, 1986)
- Renaissance (Columbia, 1987)
- Random Abstract (CBS/Sony, 1988)
- Trio Jeepy (CBS, 1989)
- Crazy People Music (Sony, 1990)
- Mo' Better Blues (Columbia, 1990)
- The Beautyful Ones Are Not Yet Born (Sony, 1991)
- Herve Sellin Sextet/Brandford Marsalis (Columbia, 1991)
- Sneakers (Columbia, 1992)
- I Heard You Twice the First Time (Columbia, 1992)
- David and Goliath (Rabbit Ears, 1992)
- Bloomington (Columbia, 1993)
- Buckshot LeFonque, Buckshot LeFonque (Sony, 1994)
- Loved Ones with Ellis Marsalis (Columbia, 1996)
- The Dark Keys (Sony Music, 1996)
- Buckshot LeFonque, Music Evolution (Sony, 1997)
- Requiem (Sony, 1999)
- Contemporary Jazz (Sony, 2000)
- Creation with the Orpheus Chamber Orchestra (Sony Classical, 2001)
- Footsteps of Our Fathers (Marsalis Music, 2002)
- Romare Bearden Revealed (Marsalis Music, 2003)
- Eternal (Marsalis Music, 2004)
- Braggtown (Marsalis Music, 2006)
- Metamorphosen with Branford Marsalis Quartet (Marsalis Music, 2008)
- American Spectrum (BIS, 2009)
- Songs of Mirth and Melancholy with Joey Calderazzo (Marsalis Music, 2011)
- Four MFs Playin' Tunes with Branford Marsalis Quartet (Marsalis Music, 2012)
- In My Solitude: Live at Grace Cathedral (Marsalis Music, 2014)
- Upward Spiral with Kurt Elling and Branford Marsalis Quartet (Marsalis Music, 2016)
- The Secret Between the Shadow and the Soul with Branford Marsalis Quartet (Marsalis Music, 2019)
- Ma Rainey's Black Bottom (Milan, 2020)
- Belonging with Branford Marsalis Quartet (Blue Note, 2025)
- Dedicated to You with Dianne Reeves (Blue Note, 2026)

=== As sideman or guest ===
With Art Blakey

- 1980: Live at Montreux and Northsea (Timeless, 1981)
- 1981: Killer Joe (Union Jazz, 1982)
- 1982: Keystone 3 (Concord Jazz, 1982)

With Terence Blanchard

- Terence Blanchard (Columbia, 1991)
- Malcolm X: The Original Motion Picture Score (Columbia, 1992)
- Wandering Moon (Sony Classical, 2000)

With Joey Calderazzo

- In the Door (Blue Note, 1991)
- To Know One (Blue Note, 1992)
- Going Home (Sunnyside, 2015)

With Harry Connick Jr.

- We Are in Love (Columbia, 1990)
- Songs I Heard (Columbia, 2001)
- Occasion: Connick on Piano, Volume 2 (Marsalis Music/Rounder, 2005)
- Your Songs (Columbia, 2009)
- Smokey Mary (Columbia, 2013)
- Every Man Should Know (Columbia, 2013)

With Bela Fleck

- Three Flew Over the Cuckoo's Nest (Warner Bros., 1993)
- Tales from the Acoustic Planet (Warner Bros., 1995)
- Live Art (Warner Bros., 1996)
- Little Worlds (Columbia, 2003)

With Dizzy Gillespie

- Closer to the Source (Atlantic, 1984)
- New Faces (GRP, 1985)

With Grateful Dead

- Without a Net (Arista, 1990)
- Infrared Roses (Grateful Dead, 1991)
- Spring 1990 (The Other One) (Rhino Entertainment, 2014)
- Wake Up to Find Out (Rhino Entertainment, 2014)
- The Best of the Grateful Dead Live (Rhino Entertainment, 2018) - compilation. on 1 track "Eyes of the World".

With Roy Hargrove

- The Vibe (Novus, 1992)
- With the Tenors of Our Time (Verve, 1994)

With Anna Maria Jopek

- ID (EmArcy, 2008)
- Ulotne (EmArcy, 2018)

With Delfeayo Marsalis

- Pontius Pilate's Decision (Novus, 1992)
- Minions Domain (Troubadour, 2006)

With Ellis Marsalis Jr.

- Whistle Stop (CBS, 1994)
- Loved Ones (Columbia, 1996)
- Pure Pleasure for the Piano (Verve, 2012)

With Wynton Marsalis

- Wynton Marsalis (Columbia, 1982)
- Think of One (CBS, 1983)
- Hot House Flowers (Columbia, 1984)
- Black Codes (From the Underground) (Columbia, 1985)
- Joe Cool's Blues (Columbia, 1995)
- Jump Start and Jazz (Sony Classical, 1997)

With Frank McComb

- Love Stories (Columbia, 2000)
- The Truth Vol. 2 (Expansion, 2006)
- A New Beginning (Boobescoot, 2010)

With Sting

- The Dream of the Blue Turtles (A&M, 1985)
- Bring On the Night (A&M, 1986)
- ...Nothing Like the Sun (A&M, 1987)
- The Soul Cages (A&M, 1991)
- Mercury Falling (A&M, 1996)
- Brand New Day (A&M, 1999)
- Live in Berlin (Deutsche Grammophon, 2010)
- 44/876 (Interscope/A&M, 2018)
- My Songs (A&M, 2019)
- The Bridge (A&M, 2021)

With James Taylor

- New Moon Shine (Columbia, 1991)
- Hourglass (Columbia, 1997)

With Doug Wamble

- Country Libations (Marsalis Music, 2003)
- Bluestate (Marsalis Music, 2005)

With Jeff "Tain" Watts

- Citizen Tain (Columbia, 1999)
- Watts (Dark Key Music, 2009)

With others

- Roy Ayers, You Might Be Surprised (Columbia, 1985)
- Allman Brothers, Cream of the Crop (Peach, 2018)
- Victor Bailey, Bottom's Up (Atlantic, 1989)
- Joanne Brackeen, Fi-Fi Goes to Heaven (Concord Jazz, 1987)
- Alex Bugnon, As Promised (Narada/Virgin, 2000)
- Mary Chapin Carpenter, Stones in the Road (Columbia, 1994)
- Dori Caymmi, Kicking Cans (Qwest, 1993)
- Ornette Coleman, Celebrate Ornette (Song X, 2016)
- Steve Coleman, Sine Die (Pangaea, 1988)
- Crosby, Stills & Nash, Live It Up (Atlantic, 1990)
- Miles Davis, Decoy (Columbia, 1984)
- Dirty Dozen Brass Band, Voodoo (Columbia, 1989)
- Ray Drummond, Susanita (Nilva, 1984)
- Kurt Elling, The Questions (Okeh, 2018)
- Kevin Eubanks, Opening Night (GRP, 1985)
- Robin Eubanks, Karma (JMT, 1991)
- Charles Fambrough, The Proper Angle (CTI, 1991)
- Jerry Goldsmith, The Russia House (MCA, 1990)
- Benny Golson, Tenor Legacy (Arkadia Jazz, 1998)
- Paul Grabowsky, Tales Of Time And Space (Sanctuary, 2005)
- Dave Grusin, Migration (GRP, 1989)
- Russell Gunn, Young Gunn Plus (32 Jazz, 1998)
- Charlie Haden, Dream Keeper (DIW, 1990)
- Everette Harp, Common Ground (Blue Note Contemporary, 1993)
- Billy Hart, Oshumare (Gramavision, 1984)
- Shirley Horn, You Won't Forget Me (Verve, 1991)
- James Horner, Sneakers (Columbia, 1992)
- Bruce Hornsby, Harbor Lights (RCA, 1993)
- Robert Hurst, Robert Hurst Presents: Robert Hurst (Columbia, 1993)
- Bobby Hutcherson, Good Bait (Landmark, 1985)
- Miles Jaye, Miles (Island, 1987)
- Carole King, City Streets (Capitol, 1989)
- Kenny Kirkland, Kenny Kirkland (GRP, 1991)
- Bill Lee, Do the Right Thing: Original Motion Picture Score (Columbia, 1989)
- Michael McDonald, Wide Open (BMG, 2017)
- Marcus Miller, M² (Telarc, 2001)
- Youssou N'Dour, The Guide (Columbia, 1994)
- Neville Brothers, Uptown (EMI, 1987)
- Ivan Neville, Thanks (Iguana, 1995)
- Makoto Ozone, The Trio (Verve, 2000)
- John Patitucci, Communion (Concord Jazz, 2001)
- Courtney Pine, The Vision's Tale (Antilles, 1989)
- Eric Revis, In Memory of Things Yet Seen (Clean Feed, 2014)
- Sonny Rollins, Falling in Love with Jazz (Milestone, 1989)
- Renee Rosnes, Renee Rosnes (Blue Note, 1990)
- David Sanchez, Melaza (Columbia, 2000)
- Janis Siegel, At Home (Atlantic, 1987)
- Horace Silver, It's Got to Be Funky (Columbia, 1993)
- Ed Thigpen, Young Men & Olds (Timeless, 1990)
- Tina Turner, Break Every Rule (Capitol, 1986)
- Chucho Valdes, Border-Free (Harmonia Mundi/JazzVillage, 2013)
- Vinx, Rooms in My Fatha's House (I.R.S., 1991)
- Randy Waldman, Unreel (Concord Jazz, 2001)
- Joe Louis Walker, JLW (Verve, 1994)
- Was (Not Was), Born to Laugh at Tornadoes (Geffen, 1983)
- Rob Wasserman, Trios (GRP, 1994)
- Cleveland Watkiss, Blessing in Disguise (Polydor, 1991)
- Mark Whitfield, True Blue (Verve, 1994)
- Nancy Wilson, Forbidden Lover (CBS, 1993)
- Ben Wolfe, No Stranger Here (Maxjazz, 2008)
- Stevie Wonder, Conversation Peace (Motown, 1995)
- Bootsy Collins, Victor Wooten, Fantaazma, "Hip Hop Lollipop" (Bootzilla Records, 2022)

== Filmography ==
- Bring on the Night (himself) (1985)
- Throw Momma From the Train (Lester) (1987)
- School Daze (Jordan) (1988)
- Living Single (himself) Season 2 (1994–95)
- Mr. and Mrs. Loving (1996; composer)
- Eve's Bayou (Harry Delacroix) (1997)
- Branford Marsalis - The Sound Illusionist (2016)

== See also ==
- Marsalis Jams

Media offices
Preceded by Doc Severinsen	The Tonight Show bandleader 1992–1995	Succeeded by Kevin Eubanks
