= Marsalis Music =

- Founded: 2002
- Founder: Branford Marsalis
- Genre: Jazz
- Country of origin: U.S.
- Location: Cambridge, Massachusetts
- Official website: www.marsalismusic.com

Marsalis Music is a jazz record label founded by Branford Marsalis in 2002.

After 20 years with Columbia, saxophonist Branford Marsalis left to start his own label. Early musicians to the label included Miguel Zenón, a Puerto Rican saxophonist, Doug Wamble, a guitarist from Tennessee, and Harry Connick Jr., who, like the Marsalis family, is from New Orleans.

The catalogue includes The Marsalis Family: A Jazz Celebration, and Music Redeems, the only recorded performances of the father and sons together (father Ellis with sons Branford, Wynton, Delfeayo, and Jason). The catalogue also includes Romare Bearden Revealed, a tribute to the visual artist created in conjunction with a traveling exhibition of his work curated by the National Gallery of Art in Washington, D.C.

In 2006, the label inaugurated the Honors Series to pay tribute to underappreciated musicians. The series has featured Michael Carvin, Jimmy Cobb, Bob French, and Alvin Batiste.

Marsalis Music receives worldwide distribution and marketing support from Okeh Records.

== Roster ==
- Harry Connick, Jr.
- Branford Marsalis
- Branford Marsalis Quartet
- The Marsalis Family
- Miguel Zenón
- Joey Calderazzo
- Doug Wamble
- Claudia Acuña

== Honors Series Artists ==
- Alvin Batiste
- Michael Carvin
- Jimmy Cobb
- Bob French

== Discography ==
- Footsteps of Our Fathers (2002) – Branford Marsalis
- Marsalis Family: A Jazz Celebration (2003) – The Marsalis Family
- Marsalis Family: A Jazz Celebration (2003) (DVD) – The Marsalis Family
- Country Libations (2003) – Doug Wamble
- Romare Bearden Revealed (2003) – Branford Marsalis
- Other Hours (2003) – Harry Connick Jr.
- Ceremonial (2004) – Miguel Zenón
- Haiku (2004) – Joey Calderazzo
- Eternal (2004) – Branford Marsalis
- Coltrane's A Love Supreme Live (2004) (DVD) – Branford Marsalis
- Bluestate (2005) – Doug Wamble
- Jíbaro (2005) – Miguel Zenón
- Occasion (2005) – Harry Connick Jr.
- A Duo Occasion (2005) (DVD) – Harry Connick Jr. & Branford Marsalis
- Marsalis Music Honors Series: Michael Carvin (2006) – Michael Carvin
- Marsalis Music Honors Series: Jimmy Cobb (2006) – Jimmy Cobb
- Braggtown (2006) – Branford Marsalis Quartet
- Chanson du Vieux Carré (2007) – Harry Connick Jr.
- Marsalis Music Honors Series: Alvin Batiste (2007) – Alvin Batiste
- Marsalis Music Honors Series: Bob French (2007) – Bob French
- Amanecer (2007) – Joey Calderazzo
- Awake (2008) – Miguel Zenón
- Metamorphosen (2009) – Branford Marsalis Quartet
- En Este Momento (2009) – Claudia Acuña
- Esta Plena (2009) – Miguel Zenón
- Music Redeems (2010) – The Marsalis Family
- Songs of Mirth and Melancholy (2011) – Branford Marsalis and Joey Calderazzo
- Alma Adentro: The Puerto Rican Songbook (2011) – Miguel Zenón
- Music from The Happy Elf: Connick On Piano, Vol. 4 (2011) – Harry Connick Jr.
- Four MFs Playin' Tunes (2012) (CD and Vinyl) – Branford Marsalis Quartet
- In My Solitude: Live at Grace Cathedral (2014) (CD and Vinyl via Okeh Records) – Branford Marsalis
- Upward Spiral (2016) (CD and Vinyl via Okeh Records) – Branford Marsalis Quartet with special guest Kurt Elling
