= Delfeayo Marsalis =

American trombonist (born 1965)

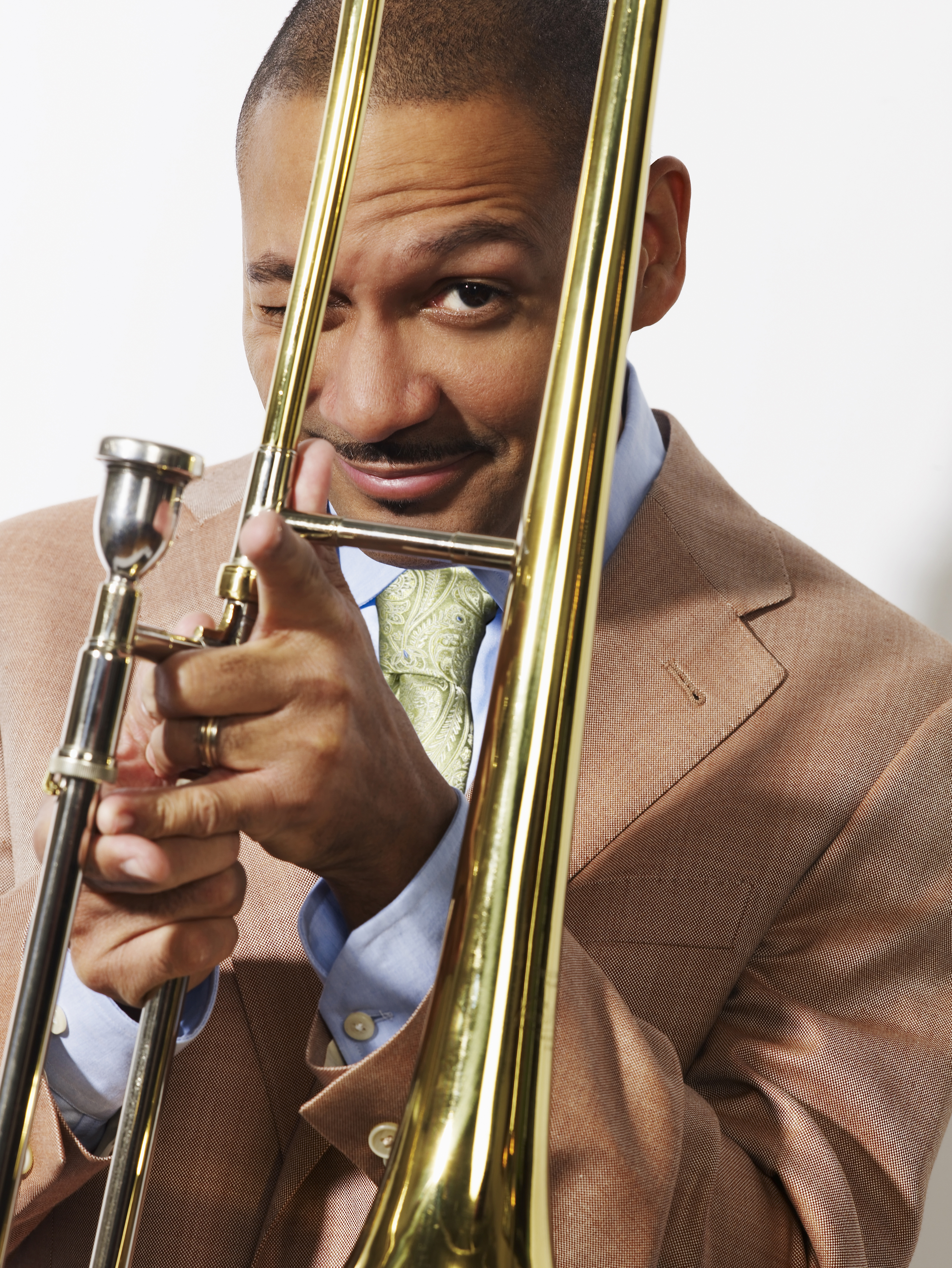
- Marsalis in 2010

Background information
- Born: July 28, 1965 (age 61); New Orleans, Louisiana, U.S.
- Genres: Jazz
- Occupations: Musician, record producer, educator
- Instrument: Trombone
- Label: Troubador Jass
- Website: dmarsalis.com

Delfeayo Ferdinand Marsalis (/ˈdɛl fiː oʊ/; born July 28, 1965) is an American jazz trombonist, record producer and educator.

== Life and career ==
Marsalis was born in New Orleans, the son of Dolores (née Ferdinand) and Ellis Louis Marsalis, Jr., a pianist and music professor. He is also the grandson of Ellis Marsalis, Sr., and the brother of Wynton Marsalis (trumpeter), Branford Marsalis (saxophonist), and Jason Marsalis (drummer). Delfeayo also has two brothers who are not musicians: Ellis Marsalis III (b. 1964) is a poet, photographer and computer networking specialist based in Baltimore, and Mboya Kenyatta (b. 1970), who has been diagnosed with autism and was the primary inspiration for Delfeayo's founding of the New Orleans–based Uptown Music Theatre. Formed in 2000, UMT has trained over 300 youth and staged eight original musicals, all of which are based upon the mission of "community unity".

Delfeayo has recorded eight of his own albums and is known for his work as a producer of acoustic jazz recordings. Along with Tonight Show engineer Patrick Smith, Delfeayo coined a phrase that was primarily responsible for the shift in many jazz recordings from rock and roll production to the resurgence of acoustic recording. "To obtain more wood sound from the bass, this album recorded without usage of the dreaded bass direct" first appeared on brother Branford's Renaissance (Columbia, 1987), and became the single sentence to define the recorded quality of many acoustic jazz recordings since the late 1980s. He is a graduate of Berklee College of Music, and in 2004 received an MA in jazz performance from the University of Louisville.

== Personal life ==
Marsalis was raised Catholic.

== Awards and honors ==
=== National Endowment for the Arts ===
Marsalis, with his father and brothers, are group recipients of the 2011 NEA Jazz Masters Award.

=== OffBeat's Best of The Beat Awards ===
| Year | Category | Work nominated | Result | Ref. |
|---|---|---|---|---|
| 2006 | Producer of the Year | | Won | |
| 2009 | Best Trombonist | | Won | |
| 2016 | Best Contemporary Jazz Band or Performer | | Won | |
| 2016 | Best Contemporary Jazz Album | Make America Great Again! (with the Uptown Jazz Orchestra) | Won | |
| 2020 | Best Contemporary Jazz Album | Jazz Party (with the Uptown Jazz Orchestra) | Won | |
| 2023 | Best Contemporary Jazz Album | Uptown on Mardi Gras Day (with the Uptown Jazz Orchestra) | Won | |

== Discography ==
=== As leader ===
Album cover for Pontius Pilate's Decision

- Pontius Pilate's Decision (Novus, 1992)
- Musashi (Evidence, 1996)
- Minions Dominion (Troubadour Jass, 2006)
- Sweet Thunder: Duke and Shak (Troubadour Jass, 2011)
- The Last Southern Gentlemen (Troubadour Jass, 2014)
- Make America Great Again (Troubadour Jass, 2016)
- Kalamazoo (Troubadour Jass, 2017)
- Jazz Party (Troubadour Jass, 2020)

=== As sideman ===
With Branford Marsalis

- 1992 I Heard You Twice the First Time
- 1994 Buckshot LeFonque
- 1997 Music Evolution
- 2003 Romare Bearden Revealed

With others

- 1993 It Don't Mean a Thing, Elvin Jones (Enja)
- 1994 The Place To Be, Benny Green (Blue Note)
- 1994 Joe Cool's Blues, Ellis Marsalis/Wynton Marsalis
- 1996 Hold on Tight, Kermit Ruffins
- 1997 Jazzfest, Elvin Jones
- 1997 R+B = Ruth Brown, Ruth Brown
- 1998 Crackerjack, Clutch
- 1999 Citizen Tain, Jeff "Tain" Watts
- 2000 Spirits of Congo Square, Donald Harrison
- 2000 The Search, Wycliffe Gordon
- 2003 The Marsalis Family: A Jazz Celebration, Marsalis Family
- 2006 Concrete Jungle: The Music of Bob Marley, Monty Alexander
- 2006 Standards Only, Wycliffe Gordon
- 2009 Ms. B's Blues, Ruth Brown
- 2010 Music Redeems, Marsalis Family
- 2016 Trilogy, Ana Popović

== Filmography ==
- Sound of Redemption: The Frank Morgan Story (2014)
- Soundtrack to The Courage of Her Convictions (documentary about Maureen Kelleher-Activists & Artist) (2016)
