= Kwei-Armah =

Kwei-Armah is a Ga surname, which means "to find the way". Notable people with the surname include:

- Ayi Kwei Armah, (born 1939), a Ghanaian writer notable for works like Two Thousand Seasons and The Beautyful Ones Are Not Yet Born.
- Kwame Kwei-Armah OBE (born 1967 as Ian Roberts) a British actor and comedian
