= Ghanaians =

People of Ghana

- Ghana
- Map of the Ghanaian diaspora in the world

Total population
- c. 35 million

Regions with significant populations
- Ghana: 34 million (2024 estimate)
- Nigeria: 500,000 (2021)
- United States: 256,750 (2015) ^{[n1]}
- United Kingdom: 250,000 (2021)^{[n1]}
- Ivory Coast: 111,024
- Italy: 50,414 (2015)^{[n1]}
- Netherlands: 40,000 (2003)^{[n1]}
- Canada: 35,495 (2016)^{[n1]}
- Germany: 39,000 (2023) ^{[n1]}
- Spain: 12,699 (2007) ^{[n1]}
- Lebanon: 10,297 (2013) ^{[n1]}
- France: 10,000 (2007) ^{[n1]}
- South Africa: 10,000 (2010)^{[n1]}
- Belgium: 5,600 (2015) ^{[n1]}
- Sweden: 5,266 (2024) ^{[n1]}
- Australia: 3,866 (2011) ^{[n1]}
- Israel: 3,000 (2003) ^{[n1]}
- Norway: 2,424 (2014) ^{[n1]}
- Japan: 2,000
- Finland: 2,135 (2017) ^{[n1]}
- Senegal: 2,000
- Denmark: 1,600 (2015) ^{[n1]}
- Cuba: 533 (2011) ^{[n1]}
- Turkey: 500 (2012) ^{[n1]}
- New Zealand: 277 (2007) ^{[n1]}
- Russia: 200 (2011) ^{[n1]}
- Brazil: 442,189 (2013)^{[n1]}
- United Arab Emirates: 300
- Togo: 47,000
- Benin: 16,000
- Liberia: 8,000
- Mali: 6,000

Languages
- English (lingua franca); French; Twi; Ga; Dangme; Ewe; Dagbani; Hausa; Guan; Fanti; Nzema; Gonja; Other languages of Ghana

Religion
- 71.2% Christian; 20% Muslim; Traditional 5.2%, Other 0.8%, None 5.2%

Related ethnic groups
- 47.5% Akan; 16.6% Dagbani-Mole; 13.9% Ewe; 7.4% Ga-Adangbe

Ghanaians are people originating from the Ghanaian Gold Coast. Ghanaians predominantly inhabit the Republic of Ghana and are the predominant cultural group and residents of Ghana, numbering 34 million people as of 2024, making up 85% of the population. The word "Ghana" means "warrior king". An estimated diaspora population of 4 million people worldwide are of Ghanaian descent. The term ethnic Ghanaian may also be used in some contexts to refer to a group of related ethnic groups native to the Gold Coast.

== History ==
The ethnogenesis of Ghanaians is traced back to nomadic migration from Nubia along the Sahara desert then south to the Gold Coast, and the Ghanaian ethnogenesis taking place on the Ghanaian Gold Coast region from the 10th to 16th century AD. Early Ghanaians were involved in a lucrative trade with gold bars and other natural minerals to the Portuguese in 1471; these Ghanaian states were among the wealthiest on the African continent from the 17th century onwards, following successful further expansion of lucrative Ghanaian gold bars trading to the Dutch, Prussian and Scandinavians from the 16th century through to the 20th century.

Early Ghanaians established a number of powerful kingdoms and empires from the 10th to 17th century, some of which became great powers in the west African region. By 1902, the kingdoms had been annexed by the United Kingdom to the Gold Coast colony following a series of Anglo-Ghanaian conflicts in the 19th century. Ghanaians gained their independence from British colonial rule in 1957, and renamed their sovereign state "Ghana (Warrior King)" because the various Ghanaian kingdoms were a warrior-based society according to contemporary and historical historiography. The Republic of Ghana was the first African country to gain independence from European colonial rule.

== Demographics and genetics ==
More than 90% of the Ghanaian citizens in Ghana live in urban areas—a figure higher than the world average. The rate of Ghana's population growth is at the world average. Most Ghanaians move to urban areas seeking well-paid jobs. Ghanaians have high level of education in science, technology, mathematics and vocational studies. However, the rural areas have large productivity in agricultural produce. Ethnic groups in Ghana include the Akan (47.3%), the Mole-Dagbon (18.5%), the Ewe (13.9%), the Ga-Dangme (7.4%), the Gurma (5.7%) and the Guan (3.7%).

According to a 2005 Y-DNA study, indigenous Ghanaians in Ghana carry 61% E1b1a. (Note: Ghana Kwa: Indigenous Ghanaians of Kwa-speaking ethnicity in Ghana 68.8% of Ghana's population ― Akan (Ashanti, Fanti), Ga-Adangbe, and Ewe; see also Y-DNA haplogroups in populations of Sub-Saharan Africa.) Indigenous Ghanaians also belong to paternal lineages at 2.2% E1a. Indigenous Ghanaians in Ghana are 1.1% E1b1b clade bearers, a haplogroup that is most common in North Africa and the Horn of Africa. West Eurasian haplogroup R1b is present in 1.1% of the population.

== National identity and citizenship in Ghana ==
The inhabitants of Ghana possessing Ghanaian passports are 20 million persons, including an additional 3‒4 million persons abroad. Ghana has a diverse population that reflects its colorful history and the peoples who have populated the region from ancient times to the present, with the historic amalgam of the main groups forming the basis of Ghana's current demographics. Native West Africans make up 98% of the population. There is also a new population of Asians, Middle Easterners, Europeans and other recent immigrants.

To obtain Ghanaian nationality, one must be naturalized after seven years of Ghana Card permanent residency. The Asians, Middle Easterners and Europeans who have lived in Ghana for most of their lives have acquired Ghanaian citizenship, which is granted without any discrimination. Two thirds, or 67%, of Ghanaians speak English. There are more than 100 ethnic groups, each with its own distinct language. However, languages that belong to the same ethnic group are usually mutually intelligible. There are nine language family groups and 11 languages from these groups are officially sponsored by the government: Akuapem Twi, Asante Twi, Ewe, Fante, Ga, Dangme, Dagbani, Nzema, Ahanta language (Ahantas) Dagaare, Gonja and Kasena.

During the colonial era, a number of Europeans intermarried with Africans and had offspring, who include such notable Gold Coasters as Carel Hendrik Bartels and James Bannerman. Most European settlers left the Gold Coast after it won independence. Currently, the most significant immigrant populations in Ghana are Africans from other countries on the continent, Asians (Indians and Chinese), some of them Europeans (Britons, Portuguese, Dutch, French, Italians, Latin Americans, Poles, Scandinavians, and Germans), and Middle Easterners, particularly Lebanese and Syrians.

== Nationalism, independence and transformation to republic ==
Universal Newsreel about the independence of Ghana in 1957.

The Ghanaian nationalism was suspended by the Ghanaian government during the time of World War II, but was resumed in 1945. The Ghanaians allied with the Allies in World War II. The Fifth Pan-African Congress held in October 1945, served to form the support for the liberalization of Ghanaian colonial domination on 4 August 1947. On 12 June 1949, Kwame Nkrumah, formed the first governing party in the history of the Gold Coast, which refused to cooperate with the colonial authorities and which led to the achievement of Ghanaian independence and the opposition to the 1951 Constitution, in which Nkrumah was incarcerated together with his collaborators.

On 8 February 1951, the first elections in the history of the Gold Coast were held; Nkrumah's win was confirmed on 12 February 1951. Ghanaian nationalism was initiated in organisation with the Ghanaian nationalist movement, the Big Six and through the Gold Coast Aborigines' Rights Protection Society; then strikes and mass riots were formed on the streets of the Gold Coast by its natives for Gold Coast independence, the colonial governor at the time, the Earl of Listowel, proclaimed Gold Coast's independence on 6 March 1957. Nkrumah became the first prime minister. On 1 July 1960, Nkrumah drew up the first Constitution of Ghana; the British monarch ceased to be head of state, and Ghana became a republic.

== Population ==
Approximately 5% of Ghanaian citizens live in rural areas and 95% in urban areas. The rate of urbanization estimated for the period 2010–2015 is 4% per annum, one of the highest among developing countries.

Region (2010)	Region population	Area (km^{2})	City (2010)	City population	Administrative divisions of Ghana
Ashanti Region	4,780,380	24,389	Kumasi	1,989,062	Administrative Divisions of Ghana.
Brong-Ahafo Region	2,310,983	39,557	Sunyani	87,642	Administrative Divisions of Ghana.
Central Region	2,201,863	9,826	Cape Coast	217,032	Administrative Divisions of Ghana.
Eastern Region	2,633,154	19,323	Koforidua	127,334	Administrative Divisions of Ghana.
Greater Accra Region	4,010,054	3,245	Accra	2,291,352	Administrative Divisions of Ghana.
Northern Region	2,479,461	70,384	Tamale	537,986	Administrative Divisions of Ghana.
Upper East Region	1,046,545	8,842	Bolgatanga	66,68	Administrative Divisions of Ghana.
Upper West Region	702,110	18,476	Wa	102,446	Administrative Divisions of Ghana.
Volta Region	2,118,252	20,570	Ho	96,213	Administrative Divisions of Ghana.
Western Region	2,376,021	23,921	Sekondi-Takoradi	445,205	Administrative Divisions of Ghana.
Total Ghana	24,658,823	238,533	Accra		Administrative Divisions of Ghana.

== Subgroups ==
=== Ghanaian Arabs ===
Ghanaian Arabs are Ghanaians and citizens of Arab origin or descent. Ghanaian Arabs are mainly from Lebanon, Syria and Arab Maghreb. Ghana has the largest Arab population in western Africa.

=== Ghanaian Indians ===
Ghanaian Indians are Ghanaians and citizens of Indian origin or descent. Many Ghanaian Indians are descendants of those who migrated from India following India's partition in 1947.

== Diaspora ==
There are 3–4 million Ghanaians in the diaspora.

=== Ghanaian Australians ===
Ghanaian Australians are dual citizens with Australia and residents of Ghanaian origin and descent. More than 50% of all Ghanaian-born Australians live in Sydney, New South Wales.

=== Ghanaian Americans ===
Ghanaian Americans are dual citizens with America and residents of Ghanaian origin and descent.

=== Ghanaian Canadians ===
Ghanaian Canadians are dual citizens with Canada and residents of Ghanaian origin and descent.

=== Ghanaian British ===
Ghanaian British are dual citizens with Britain and residents of Ghanaian origin and descent.

=== Ghanaian New Zealanders ===
Ghanaian New Zealanders are dual citizens with New Zealand and residents of Ghanaian origin and descent.

=== Ghanaian Nigerians ===
An estimated 45,000 people of Ghanaian descent reside in Nigeria.

=== Ghanaian South Africans ===
Ghanaian South Africans are dual citizens with South Africa and residents of Ghanaian origin and descent.

=== Ghanaian Surinamese and Guyanese ===
Ndyuka (also spelled "Djuka") or Aukan or Okanisi sama, are a Ghanaian Akan subgroup who live in Eastern Suriname and west of French Guiana and speak the Ndyuka language, a sub-language of the Akan language. They were shipped as imported labourers slaves from the Gold Coast (modern-day Ghana) to Suriname about 300 years ago to work on Dutch-owned plantations. Ndyukas or Aukans are subdivided into the Opu, who live upstream of the Tapanahony River of southeastern Suriname, and the Bilo, who live downstream of that river. They further subdivide themselves into 14 matrilinear kinship groups called lo.

== Culture ==
Ghana's cultural diversity is most evident in cuisine, arts, literature, heritage, music, dance, clothing, and sports.

Kente is a Ghanaian ceremonial cloth traditionally used as the national costume. Kente is hand-woven on a horizontal treadle loom in strips measuring about 4 inches wide, which are sewn together into larger pieces of cloth. Cloths come in various colours, sizes and designs, which have different meanings, and are worn on important social occasions. During the 13th century, Ghanaians developed their unique art of adinkra printing.

Notable Ghanaian authors include novelists Ayi Kwei Armah (The Beautyful Ones Are Not Yet Born), Ama Ata Aidoo (Our Sister Killjoy: or Reflections from a Black-eyed Squint) and J. E. Casely Hayford, author of Osiris Rising. In addition to novels, other literary genres such as theatre and poetry have been well developed at a national level.

Ghanaian music incorporates several distinct types of instruments, including talking drums, the atenteben and koloko lute, the atumpan, and log xylophones used in asonko music. The most well-known genre to come from Ghana is highlife. Highlife originated in the late 19th century and early 20th century. In the 1990s, a new genre of music, hiplife, was created through the combination of highlife, Afro-reggae, dancehall and hip hop. Hiplife is the most popular Ghanaian music, followed by the other genre of Ghanaian music, highlife. Ghanaian dance is globally well known and performed worldwide. The dances are varied and may involve complex and co-ordinated movement of the arms, torso, hips, feet and head, performed to different Ghanaian music forms for entertainment, celebrating at festivals, and other occasions. Some popular dances include Adowa and Azonto. Other traditional dances from Ghana are Kpanlogo, Klama and Bamaya.

Sports in Ghana is dominated by association football represented by the Ghana Premier League and the Ghana national football team. The rich culture in Ghana led to the annual festival held at the capital region, Greater Accra at the James Town township which is celebrated along with the Homowo festival. This new festival called Chale Wote has caught the eyes of many who seek to experience the true Ghanaian culture and festival for themselves.

== Women ==
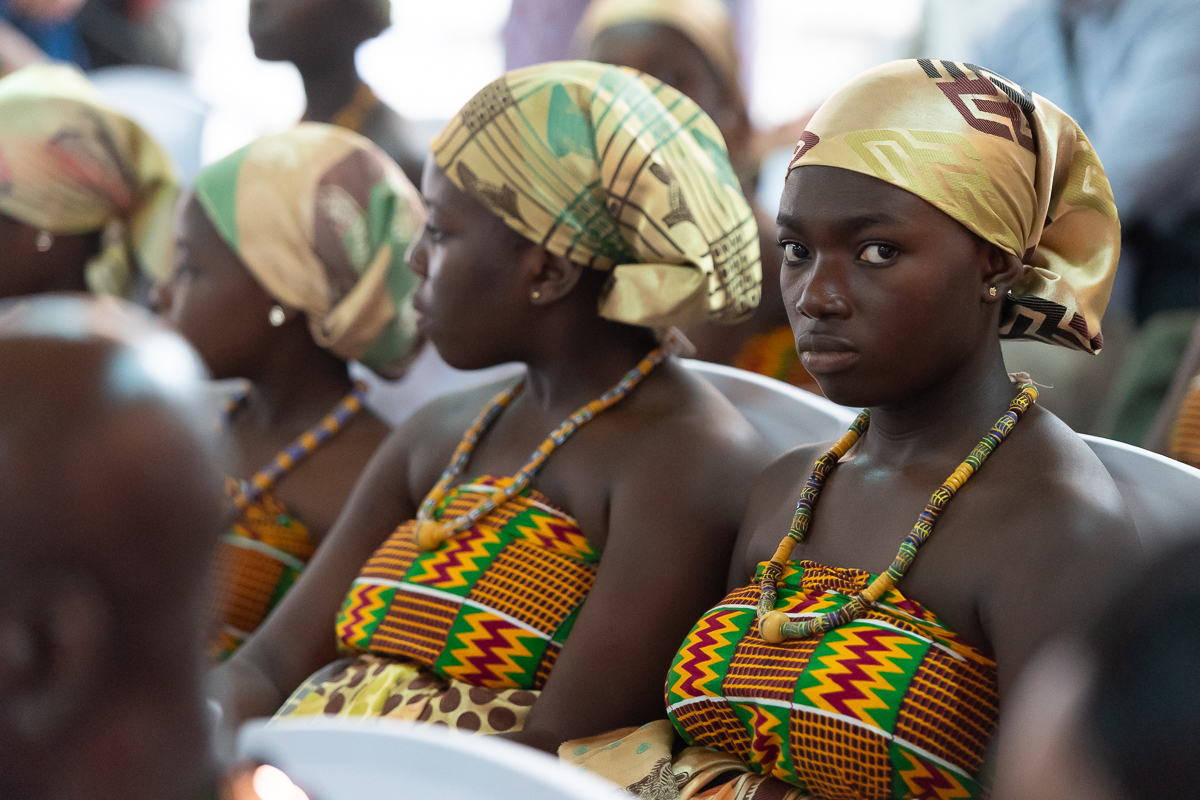
Young Ghanaian women in kente clothing at a cultural ceremony

In Ghanaian society polygyny – marriages in which men are permitted to have more than one wife at the same time – has been traditionally practised, especially among well-to-do Ghanaian men. Among matrilineal groups, such as the Akan, married women continued to reside at their maternal homes. Meals prepared by the wife would be carried to the husband at his maternal house. In polygynous situations, visitation schedules would be arranged. The separate living patterns reinforced the idea that each spouse is subject to the authority of a different household head, and because spouses are always members of different lineages, each is ultimately subject to the authority of the senior men of his or her lineage. The wife, as an outsider in the husband's family, would not inherit any of his property, other than that granted to her by her husband as gifts in token appreciation of years of devotion. The children from this matrilineal marriage would be expected to inherit from their mother's family. Today, the percentage of women in polygynous marriages in Ghana's rural areas (23.9%) is almost double that of women in Ghana's urban areas (12.4%). The age group with the most women in polygynous marriages is 45–49, followed by the 15–19 age group and the 40–44 group. Rates of polygynous marriages decrease as education level and wealth level increase.

During 2008–2012, the national literacy rate for women aged 15–24 was 83.2%, only slightly lower than that for males of the same age group (88.3%). However, literacy rates fluctuate across Ghana country and socioeconomic statuses. By regions of Ghana, literacy rates for females range from 44% to 81%. Women living at the highest socioeconomic status exhibit the highest literacy rates at 85%, while only 31% of women living at the lowest socioeconomic status are literate. Over the timespan of 2008–12, there were 4% more females enrolled in preschool than males. Net enrolment and attendance ratios for primary school were both about the same for males and females, net enrollment standing at about 84% and net attendance at about 73%. Enrolment in secondary school for females was slightly lower than for males (44.4% vs. 48.1%), but female attendance was higher by about the same difference (39.7% vs. 43.6%).

As of 2011, women made up 66.9% of economically active population in Ghana. Within the informal sector, women usually work in personal services. There are distinct differences in artisan apprenticeships offered to women and men, as well. Men are offered a much wider range of apprenticeships, such as carpenters, masons, blacksmiths, mechanics, painters, repairers of electrical and electronic appliances, upholsters, metal workers, car sprayers, etc. In contrast, most female artisans are involved in either hairdressing or dressmaking. Women generally experience a disparity in earnings, receiving a daily average of 6,280 cedis compared to 8,560 cedis received by men, according to the Ghana Living Standards Survey. Women are flourishing in teaching professions.

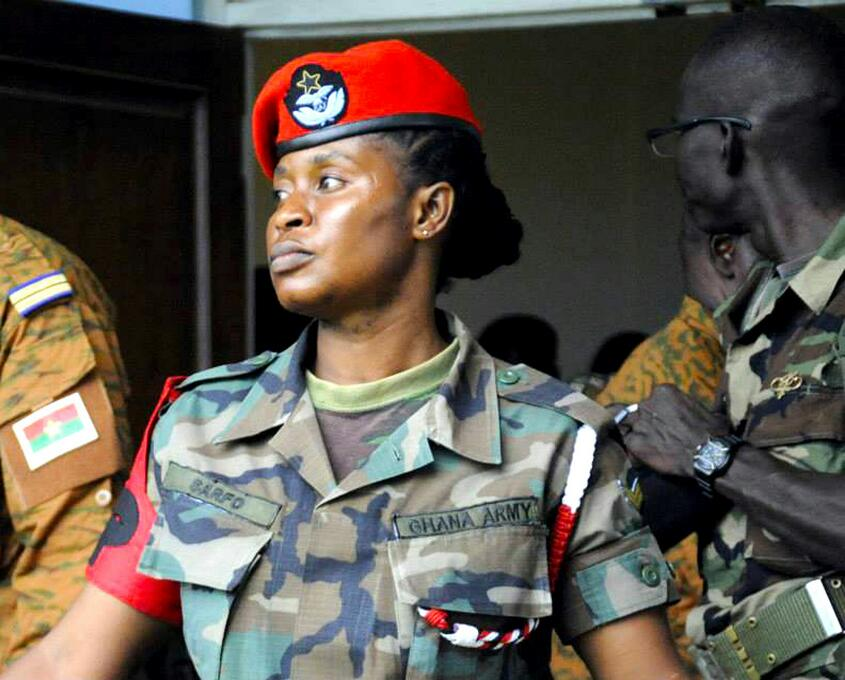
Ghana Armed Forces (GAF) Military Female Sergeant at a GAF military exercise, 2013 in Ghana.

Early 1990s' data showed that about 19% of the instructional staff at the nation's three universities in 1990 was female. Of the teaching staff in specialized and diploma-granting institutions, 20% was female; elsewhere, corresponding figures were 21% at secondary-school level; 23% at middle-school level, and as high as 42% at primary-school level. Women also dominated the secretarial and nursing professions in Ghana. When women were employed in the same line of work as men, they were paid equal wages, and they were granted maternity leave with pay. However, women in research professions report experiencing more difficulties than men in the same field, which can be linked to restricted professional networks for women because of lingering traditional familial roles.

Feminist organizing has increased in Ghana as women seek to obtain a stronger role in the nation's democratic government. In 2004, a coalition of women created the Women's Manifesto for Ghana, a document that demands economic and political equality as well as reproductive health care and other rights. The National Council for Women and Development (NCWD) is fervent in its stance that the social and economic well-being of women, who compose slightly more than half of the nation's population, cannot be taken for granted. The Council sponsored a number of studies on women's work, education, and training, and on family issues that are relevant in the design and execution of policies for the improvement of the condition of women. Among these considerations the NCWD stressed family planning, child care, and female education as paramount.

In 2007, the government of Ghana took legal proceedings to prosecute men who abuse their women.

== Republic of Ghana (1957–present) ==
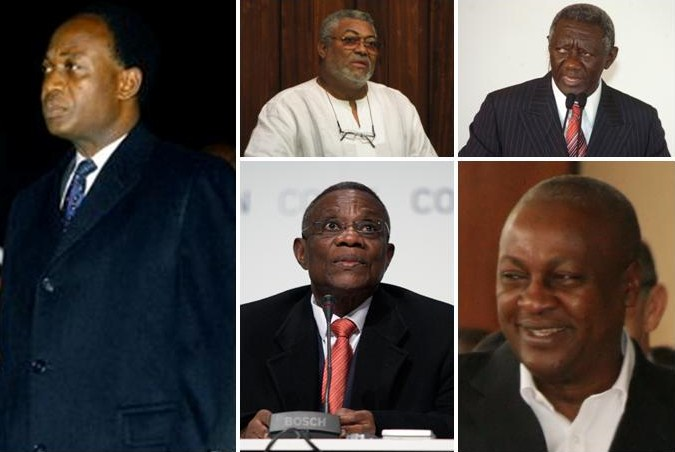
President of the Republic of Ghana and Commander-in-Chief of the Ghana Armed Forces: Nkrumah, Rawlings, Kufuor, Mills and Mahama.

In 1966, Nkrumah was deposed, after which Ghana entered a period of military rule. On 31 December 1981, the regime led by Flight lieutenant Jerry John Rawlings installed the Provisional National Defence Council (PNDC), of which he became chairman. In 1992, Rawlings retired from the military and set up the National Democratic Congress (NDC), and was subsequently elected for two terms as president.

On January 7, 2001, John Agyekum Kufuor succeeded Rawlings as Ghanaian head of state until the year 2008. Kufuor was replaced as Ghanaian head of state by John Atta Mills until his death in July 2012. In July, 2012, John Dramani Mahama succeeded Mills as the Republic of Ghana President and Commander-in-Chief of the Ghana Armed Forces.

On 7 January 2017, Nana Akufo-Addo took office as President. On 7 January 2025, John Dramani Mahama took office once again as President of the Republic of Ghana.

== See also ==
- List of Ghanaians
- Lists of rulers of Ghana
- Akan people
- Mole-Dagbon
- Kingdom of Dagbon
