= Kenny Kirkland =

American jazz pianist (1955–1998)

- Kirkland in 1991

Background information
- Born: Kenneth David Kirkland; September 28, 1955; Brooklyn, New York City, U.S.
- Died: November 12, 1998 (aged 43) Queens, New York City, U.S.
- Genres: Jazz; straight-ahead jazz; jazz fusion; post-bop
- Occupation: Musician
- Instruments: Piano; keyboards
- Years active: 1973–1998
- Labels: GRP; A&M
- Formerly of: Michał Urbaniak; Miroslav Vitouš; Wynton Marsalis; Branford Marsalis Quartet; Blue Turtles; Buckshot LeFonque; The Tonight Show Band
- Education: Manhattan School of Music

Kenneth David Kirkland (September 28, 1955 – November 12, 1998) was an American jazz pianist and keyboardist.

== Early life ==
Born in Brooklyn, New York, Kirkland was age six when he first sat down at a piano keyboard. After years of Catholic schooling, he enrolled at the Manhattan School of Music, where he studied classical piano performance, classical music theory, and composition.

== Career ==
Kirkland's first professional work came with Polish fusion violinist Michał Urbaniak, touring throughout Europe with his group in 1977. Coincidentally, his next high-profile gig was with another Eastern-European jazz émigré, Miroslav Vitouš. Kirkland is featured on Vitouš's albums First Meeting and Miroslav Vitous Group, released by ECM.

In 1980, while Kirkland was on tour in Japan with Terumasa Hino, he met Wynton Marsalis, which began his long association with both Wynton and his older brother Branford. On Wynton's self-titled debut album, Kirkland shared the piano duties with one of his musical influences, Herbie Hancock, but was the sole pianist on Marsalis's subsequent releases Think of One, Hot House Flowers and Black Codes (From the Underground).

In 1985, Kirkland (alongside Branford Marsalis) joined the Blue Turtles, the jazz-pop studio-and-touring backing band put together by Sting to perform the latter's post-Police solo work and which can be heard on his first two solo releases, The Dream of the Blue Turtles and Bring On the Night. Although the Blue Turtles would be a relatively short-lived outfit (performing two or three years of high-profile touring before Sting opted to continue with more traditional pop lineups), Kirkland would maintain his musical relationship with Sting afterwards, performing various piano and keyboard parts on subsequent studio albums.

Following his time in the Wynton Marsalis band, Kirkland's main musical collaborator would be Branford Marsalis, whose quartet he joined in 1986 as a founding member. He is also featured on Branford's funk band album Buckshot Lefonque. When Branford Marsalis assumed the high-visibility role of bandleader for NBC TV's The Tonight Show with Jay Leno, Kirkland became the band's pianist.

In 1991, he released his debut as a leader, Kenny Kirkland, on GRP Records. Also released in 1991, Thunder and Rainbows (Sunnyside), by "Jazz from Keystone", is a trio album with Kirkland, Charles Fambrough, and Jeff "Tain" Watts.

== Final years ==
Leading up to, and on, June 1–3, 1998, Kirkland worked with long-time associate Jeff "Tain" Watts on the drummer's debut recording, Citizen Tain. According to producer Delfeayo Marsalis, "He was clearly not in good shape." When asked about going to the doctor, Kirkland responded, "After the session. If I go now, they'll make me check into a hospital." On June 4, doctors told Kirkland he had a congestive heart condition that required an operation. He attributed his poor health to twenty years of touring without adequate vacations and exercise and deemed his chances of surviving any surgery 50/50 or less. Fearful of having a cardiac procedure, Kirkland accepted his fate and was soon on the road with Branford Marsalis again. On November 7, 1998, Kirkland attended Marsalis's wedding in New Rochelle, New York. Kirkland was found dead in his Queens apartment on Friday, November 13, 1998. Contemporary reports stated that drug paraphernalia was found near his body, although the cause of death was initially undetermined. A 1999 account in The New York Observer described his drug use as having been an open secret within jazz circles for years.

The official doctor's report listed his death as due to congestive heart failure. He was survived by his mother, brother, and two sisters. His longtime friend Branford Marsalis titled his 1999 album Requiem, dedicating it to Kirkland's memory.

== Philosophy ==
In a video interview with Sting published on August 29, 2020, as part of the Doctone Project, Sting relates about Kirkland's playing philosophy as follows:

"I learned a lot from him—that way of approaching harmony where there are no wrong notes, just the note that you follow with ... there are no mistakes in a Kenny Kirkland solo. What you think is wrong momentarily is suddenly put right by a choice, so that philosophy was something I learned at his feet ... You can bring that into life, too. We all make mistakes, [but] it's how we cope with them or how we react next, so that for me is the essence of jazz. You take a risk and you're rewarded by your subsequent choices."

== Discography ==
=== As leader ===
- Kenny Kirkland (GRP, 1991)

=== As sideman ===
With Chico Freeman

- Peaceful Heart, Gentle Spirit (Contemporary, 1980)
- The Pied Piper (BlackHawk, 1986) – rec. 1984

With Kenny Garrett

- Black Hope (Warner Bros., 1992)
- Songbook (Warner Bros., 1997)

With Dizzy Gillespie

- Closer to the Source (Atlantic, 1984)
- New Faces (GRP, 1985)

With Elvin Jones

- Earth Jones (Palo Alto, 1982)
- Brother John (Palo Alto, 1984) – rec. 1982

With Rodney Jones

- Articulation (Timeless Muse, 1979)
- Dreams and Stories (Savant, 2005)

With Branford Marsalis

- Scenes in the City (Columbia,1983)
- Royal Garden Blues (CBS, 1986)
- Renaissance (Columbia, 1987)
- Random Abstract (CBS, 1987)
- Crazy People Music (Sony Music, 1990)
- Mo' Better Blues (Sony Music, 1990) – soundtrack to Spike Lee's 1990 film Mo' Better Blues
- I Heard You Twice the First Time (Sony Music, 1992)
- Requiem (Sony Music, 1999)

With Wynton Marsalis

- Wynton Marsalis (Columbia, 1982) – rec. 1981
- Think of One (Columbia, 1983)
- Hot House Flowers (Columbia, 1984)
- Black Codes (From the Underground) (Columbia, 1985)

With Sting

- The Dream of the Blue Turtles (A&M, 1985)
- Bring On the Night (A&M, 1986) – live
- Nothing Like the Sun (A&M, 1987)
- Nada como el sol (A&M, 1988) – EP
- The Soul Cages (A&M, 1991)
- Mercury Falling (A&M, 1996)

With Miroslav Vitouš

- First Meeting (ECM, 1980) – rec. 1979
- Miroslav Vitous Group (ECM, 1981) – rec. 1980

With Jeff "Tain" Watts

- Megawatts (Sunnyside, 1991)
- Citizen Tain (Columbia, 1999)

With others

- Stone Alliance, Heads Up (PM, 1980)
- Franco Ambrosetti, Wings (Enja, 1984) – rec. 1983
- Niels Bijl, Mozaik (Aliud, 2010)
- Terence Blanchard, Jazz in Film (Sony, 1999) – rec. 1998
- Carla Bley, Heavy Heart (WATT, 1984) – rec. 1983
- Michael Brecker, Michael Brecker (Impulse!, 1987)
- Hiram Bullock, From All Sides (Atlantic, 1986)
- Peter Erskine, Peter Erskine (Contemporary, 1982)
- Billy Hart, Rah (Gramavision, 1988)
- Jay Hoggard, Rain Forest (Contemporary, 1981) – rec. 1980
- Robert Hurst, One for Namesake (DIW, 1994) – rec. 1993
- Dave Liebman, What It Is (CBS/Sony, 1980) – rec. 1979
- Delfeayo Marsalis, Pontius Pilate's Decision (1992)
- Arturo Sandoval, I Remember Clifford (GRP, 1992)
- John Scofield, Who's Who? (Arista, 1979)
- Tom Scott, Born Again (GRP, 1992)
- Lew Soloff, But Beautiful (Paddle Wheel, 1987)
