= Matt Finders =

American trombonist (born 1960)

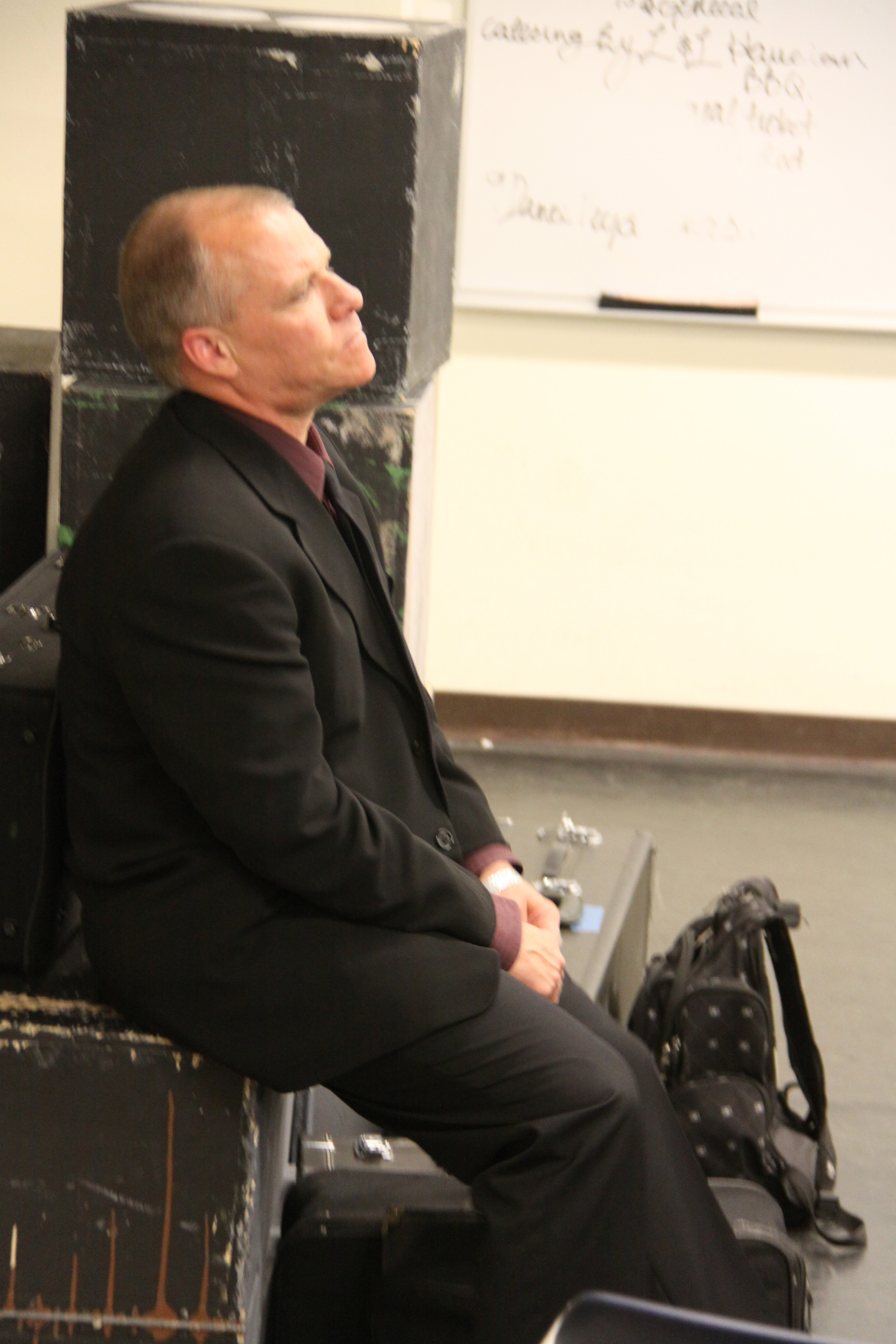
- Matt Finders at the 2011 Reno Jazz Festival

Background information
- Born: February 12, 1960 (age 65); Livermore, California United States
- Genres: Jazz, Jazz Fusion, Pop, R&B, Classical
- Occupation(s): Musician, Composer, Arranger
- Instrument(s): Trombone, Piano, Euphonium, Double Bass, Tuba
- Years active: 1969–present
- Website: jazzlabb.com

Matt Finders (born February 12, 1960) is an American trombonist based in Southern California. A former member of The Tonight Show Band, he has played with various big bands and in major musical productions on Broadway. Though Finders has worked in many genres, his primary focus is on jazz. He works on various projects in the Los Angeles area and has traveled as a clinician and guest artist to various schools around the nation.

== Biography ==
=== Early years ===
Finders was born and grew up in Livermore, California. At age nine, he chose to begin studying trombone while attending Fifth Street Elementary because his brother already had one. He began playing jazz at East Avenue Middle School and later played in the Livermore High School Jazz Band and went on to study at San Jose State University.

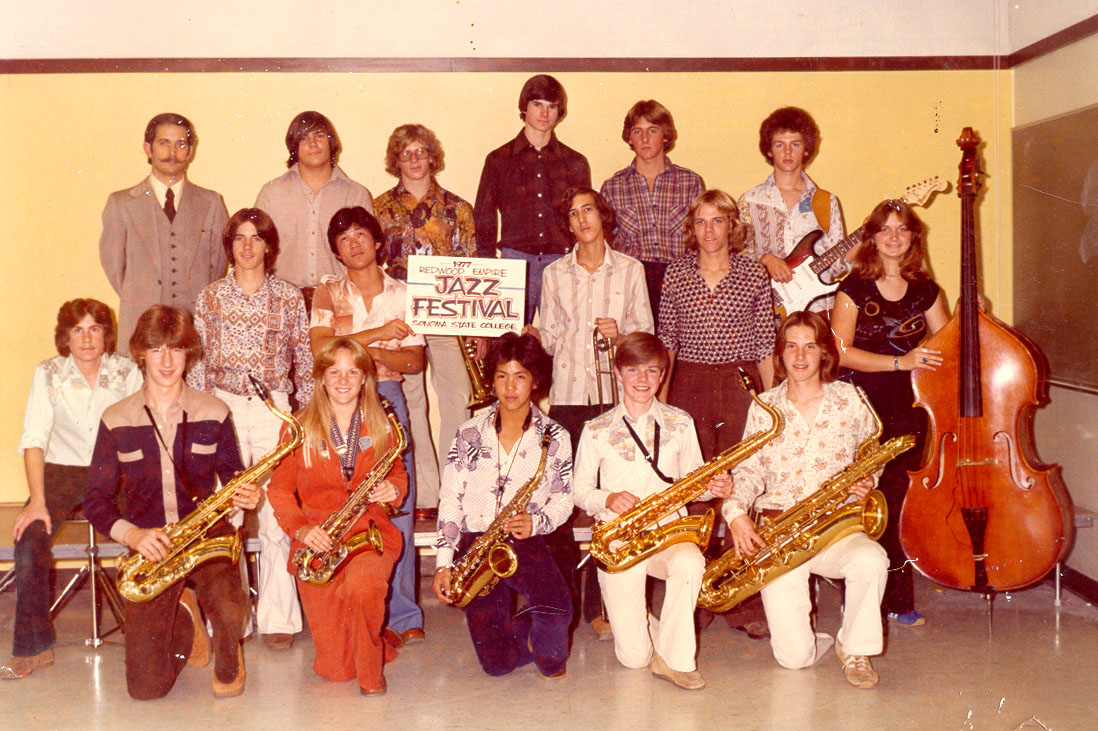
Matt Finders as a member of the Livermore High School Jazz Band

=== Career ===
Finders has recorded with the big bands of Toshiko Akiyoshi, Bob Mintzer and Bill Warfield among others, and was the trombonist with Tonight Show with Jay Leno Band led by Kevin Eubanks. He has also played with Natalie Cole, Harry Connick Jr., Sting, Benny Goodman's Orchestra, Branford Marsalis, the Woody Herman Big Band and others. He joined Clark Terry's big band, where he played alongside Marsalis. He also played for a number of successful Broadway musicals, including Cats, 42nd Street, City of Angels, The Secret Garden and Starlight Express. He also played at venues all across New York, ranging from Latin gigs to big band to disco. He was a frequent player at the Red Parrot club, a popular disco club, and played with Benny Goodman on October 7, 1985 at The New York Marriott Marquis.

=== Recent activities ===
Finders currently lives in Livermore, California, with his wife, Terilyn Finders, and two daughters, Beth and Hannah. He leads high school and middle school bands in the area and is the creator and leader of JazzLabb, a weeklong summer camp dedicated to Jazz in Livermore. He is the leader of The Mendenhall Middle School Jazz Band and East Avenue Jazz Band. Many of the tunes played by the groups are Finders's own originals. He currently plays and records with an octet, which has featured various players, including Chuck Findley, Big Phat Band's Brian Scanlon, and many others.

He organizes a local group of musicians to play at Retzlaff Vineyards in Livermore, California approximately every month.

== Compositions ==
- The Dork
- B flat Jam Blues
- You Get What You Get
- Skump (Aardvark Soup)
- Spliff
- Banana Spit

== Discography ==
=== As sideman ===
- Wishing Peace (Toshiko Akiyoshi)(1986)
- Time Waits for No One (Loren Schoenberg)(1987)
- Yale Archives, Vol. 1-2: Live at Basin Street (Benny Goodman)(1988)
- Solid Ground (Loren Schoenberg)(1988)
- Electric Youth (Debbie Gibson) (1989)
- Gigi On The Beach (1989)
- Buck Clayton Swings The Village (Buck Clayton) (1990)
- Carnegie Hall Concert (Toshiko Akiyoshi)(1991)
- Secret Garden (1991)
- Art of the Big Band (Bob Mintzer) (1991)
- Youkali (Jim Hall) (1992)
- Fool For You (1993)
- Motion Poet (Peter Erskine) (1993)
- Shape I'm In (Joe Roccisano) (1993)
- Buckshot LeFonque (Buckshot LeFonque) (1994)
- Tribute to Curtis Mayfield (1994)
- City Never Sleeps (Bill Warfield Big Band) (1994)
- Madness (Tony MacAlpine) (1994)
- Some Cow Fonque (Buckshot LeFonque) (1995)
- Men In Black (1997)
- Blues for Schuur (Dianne Schuur) (1997)
- Art of Saxophone (1997)
- Very Best of Dianne Schuur (Dianne Schuur) (1997)
- Last Time I Was Here (Bryan Duncan) (1998)
- Out of This World (1999)
- Absolute Brass (2001)
- Let's Dance (Benny Goodman) (2002)
- Inverse Universe (Claudia Villela) (2003)
- All Across the City (Jim Hall) (2003)
