= Buckshot LeFonque (album) =

Studio album by Buckshot LeFonque (Branford Marsalis)
- Released: August 1994
- Recorded: 1994
- Genres: Jazz rap; R&B
- Length: 41:47
- Label: Columbia
- Producers: Branford Marsalis, DJ Premier, Blackheart

Branford Marsalis chronology
Bloomington (1993)	Buckshot LeFonque (1994)	Loved Ones (1996)

Professional ratings
Review scores
Source	Rating
AllMusic	4/5 stars
Entertainment Weekly	C−

Buckshot LeFonque is the debut album of Branford Marsalis's jazz/hip-hop/rock group of the same name. Creating a new hybrid sound, it peaked at number 38 on the Heatseekers Billboard chart and number 94 on the R&B Albums chart.

In his AllMusic review, Richard Ginell calls the album "a breakthrough... a marvelously playful and, above all, musical fusion of the old jazz verities and newer currents swirling around the 1990s." David Hajdu's Entertainment Weekly review was more harsh, saying, "The gimmick betrays a project of iffy conviction" and calling the project "old-fashioned," "uninspired," and "all too serious." And People wrote, "Buckshot Lefonque goes from being a cool idea to be-coming cool music only when Branford and crew let hip hop's noise erupt."

== Track listing ==
All tracks are written by Branford Marsalis, except where indicated.

No.	Title	Writer(s)	Length
1.	"Ladies & Gentlemen, Presenting..."	Branford Marsalis, Chris E. Martin	1:14
2.	"The Blackwidow Blues"		6:10
3.	"I Know Why the Caged Bird Sings"	Maya Angelou, Marsalis	8:05
4.	"Mona Lisas (And Mad Hatters)"	Elton John, Bernie Taupin	4:49
5.	"Wonders and Signs"	Marsalis, Chris E. Martin	5:34
6.	"Ain't It Funny"		6:45
7.	"Some Cow Fonque (More Tea, Vicar?)"		5:12
8.	"Some Shit @ 78 BPM (The Scratch Opera)"	Martin	2:10
9.	"Hotter Than Hot"	Martin	4:20
10.	"Breakfast @ Denny's"	Marsalis, Martin	6:25
11.	"Shoot the Piano Player"		0:10
12.	"No Pain, No Gain"	Marsalis, Martin, Victor Wooten	5:27
13.	"Sorry, Elton"		0:26
14.	"...And We Out"		2:08

== Personnel ==
- Branford Marsalis – Saxophones
- Roy Hargrove – Trumpet
- David Barry – Guitar
- DJ Premier – Drum Programming and scratching
- Matt Finders – Trombone
- Mino Cinelu – Percussion
- Delfeayo Marsalis – Trombone, Piano
- Kenny Kirkland – Piano
- Robert Hurst – Bass
- Vicki Randle – Percussion
- Maya Angelou – Vocal
- Kevin Eubanks – Guitar
- Ray Fuller – Guitar
- Nils Lofgren – Guitar
- Frank McComb – Vocal
- Greg Phillinganes – Keyboards, Moog Bass
- Jeff "Tain" Watts – Drums
- Blackheart – Vocal
- Darryl Jones – Bass
- Tammy Townsend – Vocal
- Larry Kimpel – Bass
- Chuck Morris – Drums
- Albert Collins – Guitar
- Victor Wooten – Bass

== Charts ==
Chart (1994)	Peak position
Australian Albums (ARIA Charts)	99
