= Bloomington (album) =

Live album by Branford Marsalis
- Released: May 1993
- Recorded: September 23, 1991
- Genre: Jazz
- Length: 79:02
- Label: Sony Music
- Producer: Delfeayo Marsalis

Branford Marsalis chronology
I Heard You Twice the First Time (1992)	Bloomington (1993)	Buckshot LeFonque (1994)

Professional ratings
Review scores
Source	Rating
AllMusic	2/5 stars
Entertainment Weekly	B+
Los Angeles Times	3/4 stars
The Penguin Guide to Jazz Recordings	3.5/4 stars

Bloomington is a 1993 live jazz album by saxophonist Branford Marsalis, featuring Jeff "Tain" Watts on drums and Robert Hurst on bass. It was recorded at a concert in Indiana University in Bloomington, Indiana (hence the title of the album) on September 23, 1991, while the trio was on tour. The concert occurred one month before the release of Marsalis's album The Beautyful Ones Are Not Yet Born, featuring the same lineup, and three of Bloomington's six tracks are taken from that album. Bloomington peaked at number 9 on the Top Jazz Albums chart.

Branford Marsalis's younger brother Delfeayo, who co-produced the album, was effusive in praising it, calling it "the most incredible concert recorded in our generation." Professional critics' views were mixed. In his AllMusic review, Scott Yanow calls the album "very long-winded and rather dull" and says that Marsalis "seems content to play the part of a chameleon, doing his impressions of late-period Coltrane, Sonny Rollins and (when he switches to soprano) Ornette Coleman." The Los Angeles Times praised the recording, saying "the telling of what he finds is revealing and beautiful in ways only the best improvisational music can be." Jazz historian David Hajdu called the recording "a career-positioning statement in matter-of-fact musical terms" and "insular music for the hard-bop elite" in a review for Entertainment Weekly

== Track listing ==
All tracks are written by Branford Marsalis, except where indicated.

No.	Title	Writer(s)	Length
1.	"Xavier's Lair"		15:14
2.	"Everything Happens to Me"	Tom Adair, Matt Dennis	7:52
3.	"The Beautyful Ones Are Not Yet Born"		19:24
4.	"Citizen Tain"		16:52
5.	"Friday the 13th"	Thelonious Monk	11:17
6.	"Roused About"	Robert Hurst	7:20

== Personnel ==
- Branford Marsalis – tenor & soprano saxophone
- Jeff "Tain" Watts – drums
- Robert Hurst – acoustic bass
