= Scenes in the City =

Studio album by Branford Marsalis
- Released: 1984
- Studios: RCA (New York City, New York)
- Genre: Jazz
- Label: Columbia
- Producer: Thomas Mowrey

Branford Marsalis chronology
Fathers and Sons (1982)	Scenes in the City (1984)	Romances for Saxophone (1986)

Scenes in the City is the debut album by American saxophonist Branford Marsalis, released in 1984. It was his first album as leader, having previously recorded the album Fathers and Sons in 1982 with his father and brothers.

== Production ==
Scenes in the City was produced by Thomas Mowrey. Bassist Ron Carter contributed to three tracks on the album. The title track was composed twenty years earlier by Charles Mingus. Marsalis composed three tracks on the album, while pianists Mulgrew Miller and Kenny Kirkland composed one track each. The album features much of the same lineup as his brother Wynton Marsalis's albums of that time period, including Black Codes (From the Underground), recorded the next year.

== Critical reception ==
Professional ratings
Review scores
Source	Rating
AllMusic	4/5 stars
The Penguin Guide to Jazz Recordings	4/4 stars

Scenes in the City was given four out of four stars and included in The Penguin Guide to Jazz's list of 1,000 Best Jazz albums, the only Branford Marsalis album of the list. Scott Yanow of AllMusic called it "ambitious yet consistently successful" and "an impressive start to a notable career."

== Track listing ==
No.	Title	Writer(s)	Length
1.	"No Backstage Pass"	Branford Marsalis	6:48
2.	"Scenes in the City"	Charles Mingus	5:51
3.	"Solstice"	Branford Marsalis	8:56
4.	"Waiting for Tain"	Branford Marsalis	6:51
5.	"No Sidestepping"	Mulgrew Miller	7:00
6.	"Parable"	Kenny Kirkland	5:34
Total length:			41:00

== Personnel ==
- Branford Marsalis – tenor saxophone, soprano saxophone
- Charnett Moffett - bass, B1
- Phil Bowler - bass, B3
- Ray Drummond - bass, A2
- Ron Carter - bass A1, A3, B2
- Jeff "Tain" Watts - drums B1, B3
- Marvin “Smitty” Smith - drums, A1, A2, A3, B2
- Wendell Pierce - narrator - A2
- Kenny Kirkland - piano, B1, B3
- Mulgrew Miller - piano, A2, A3, B2
- Robin Eubanks - trombone, A2
- John Longo, trumpet, A2
