= The Beautyful Ones Are Not Yet Born (album) =

Studio album by Branford Marsalis
- Released: October 1991
- Recorded: May – June 1991
- Studio: CTS (London, UK); RCA (New York City, US)
- Genre: Jazz
- Length: 69:38
- Label: Sony
- Producer: Delfeayo Marsalis

Branford Marsalis chronology
| Crazy People Music (1990) | The Beautyful Ones Are Not Yet Born (1991) | I Heard You Twice the First Time (1992) |

The Beautyful Ones Are Not Yet Born is a jazz album by Branford Marsalis, leading a trio with Jeff "Tain" Watts and Robert Hurst and with guest appearances from Wynton Marsalis and Courtney Pine. It was recorded May 16–18, 1991, at CTS Studio A, Wembley, England, and June 24, 1991, at RCA Studio B in New York City. It peaked at number 3 on the Top Jazz Albums chart.

== Critical reception ==
Professional ratings
Review scores
| Source | Rating |
|---|---|
| AllMusic | 4.5/5 stars |
| DownBeat | 5/5 stars |
| Entertainment Weekly | B+ |
| The Penguin Guide to Jazz Recordings | 3/4 stars |

Calling it "one of Branford Marsalis' strongest of the 1990s", Scott Yanow notes in his AllMusic review: "His playing is often reminiscent in style (but not really sound) of John Coltrane, he is more concise and disciplined than in some of his early-'90s concert appearances and [h3] is at his most explorative on this inventive blowing session." Other reviewers concurred. People called Marsalis's tone "rich and round… his phrasing and rhythm beautifully fluid." Entertainment Weekly gave a slightly more nuanced review, calling the recording "a very long and uncompromising trio recital in which Marsalis [demonstrates] his own stunning command of tenor and soprano sax. Indeed, if anything the album is too pure: The strain of improvising with only the spartan sound of bass and drums for support ultimately gets wearying…"

The album's title references the 1968 novel of the same name by Ghanaian writer Ayi Kwei Armah.

== Track listing ==
All tracks are written by Branford Marsalis, except where indicated.

| No. | Title | Writer(s) | Length |
|---|---|---|---|
| 1. | "Roused About" | Robert Hurst | 8:08 |
| 2. | "The Beautyful Ones Are Not Yet Born" | | 13:42 |
| 3. | "Xavier's Lair" | | 8:54 |
| 4. | "Cain & Abel" | | 7:34 |
| 5. | "Citizen Tain" | | 8:04 |
| 6. | "Gilligan's Isle" | | 10:45 |
| 7. | "Dewey Baby" | | 9:08 |
| 8. | "Beat's Remark" | Robert Hurst | 12:47 |

== Personnel ==
- Branford Marsalis – tenor & soprano saxophones
- Jeff "Tain" Watts – drums
- Robert Hurst – bass
- Wynton Marsalis – trumpet on "Cain & Abel"
- Courtney Pine – tenor saxophone on "Dewey Baby"
