= Buckshot LeFonque =

American band

- Genres: Jazz, hip-hop, R&B
- Years active: 1993–2000
- Label: Columbia
- Members: Branford Marsalis; Frank McComb; Raie Dacosta; Joey Calderazzo; Kermith Campbell; Russell Gunn; John Touchy; Carl Burnett; Reggie Washington; Reginald Veal; Eric Revis; DJ Apollo; DJ Premier; Rocky Bryant; Mino Cinélu; Black Heart; Buckethead

Buckshot LeFonque was a musical group project led by Branford Marsalis.

The name Buckshot LeFonque was derived by Marsalis from 'Buckshot La Funke', a pseudonym used for contractual reasons by jazz saxophonist Julian "Cannonball" Adderley on the album Here Comes Louis Smith (1958). After playing with Sting, Miles Davis, and other artists, Marsalis founded this band to create a new sound by merging classic jazz with rock, pop, R&B, and hip-hop influences.

== Career ==
Buckshot LeFonque began primarily as a collaboration between Branford Marsalis and DJ Premier. Marsalis moved from New York to Los Angeles in 1992 to commence work as the musical director on The Tonight Show, which had acquired Jay Leno as its new host. Marsalis hosted DJ Premier, as well as engineer Ben Austin, in his Los Angeles residence, and began composition on the eponymous album. He assembled a recording band primarily from the jazz players in The Tonight Show Band, which included Jeff "Tain" Watts, Robert Hurst, Kenny Kirkland, and Kevin Eubanks. The band recorded at Sony Studios Los Angeles in the summer of 1993.

Two albums were released, Buckshot LeFonque (1994; which featured mostly DJ Premier produced tracks) and the follow-up Music Evolution (1997; which featured mostly Frank McComb on the vocals). Other frequent collaborators were Branford Marsalis's brother and trombonist, Delfeayo Marsalis, and the rapper, Uptown (Raie Dacosta).

== Live band members ==
- Branford Marsalis – MC as well as tenor, alto, and soprano saxophone
- Frank McComb – keyboards and vocals
- 50 Styles: The Unknown Soldier (Raie Dacosta) – rapping
- Joey Calderazzo – keyboards / first tour
- Kermith Campbell – keyboards / until McComb was available
- Russell Gunn – trumpet
- John Touchy – trombone – first tour
- Carl Burnett – acoustic and electric guitar
- Reggie Washington – upright and electric bass / first half of first tour
- Reginald Veal – upright and electric bass / second half of first tour
- Eric Revis – upright and electric bass / second tour
- DJ Apollo – turntables "Wheels O Steel"
- DJ Premier – turntables, beats, drum programming, production
- Rocky Bryant – drums and percussion, beat sample triggering
- Mino Cinélu – percussion / first tour
- Black Heart the group – rappers / first tour
- Buckethead – guitar (studio)

== Releases ==
=== Albums ===
- Buckshot LeFonque (1994)
- Music Evolution (1997)

=== Singles ===
- "Breakfast @ Denny's" (1994)
- "Some Cow Fonque" (1994)
- "No Pain, No Gain" (1995)
- "Another Day" (1997)
- "Music Evolution" (1997)

=== Soundtracks ===
- "Reality Check" from Clockers (1995)
- "Some Cow Fonque (More Tea, Vicar?)" from Men in Black (1997)
- "Breakfast @ Denny's (New Version)" from Once in the Life (2000)
