= Russell Gunn =

American jazz trumpeter (born 1971)

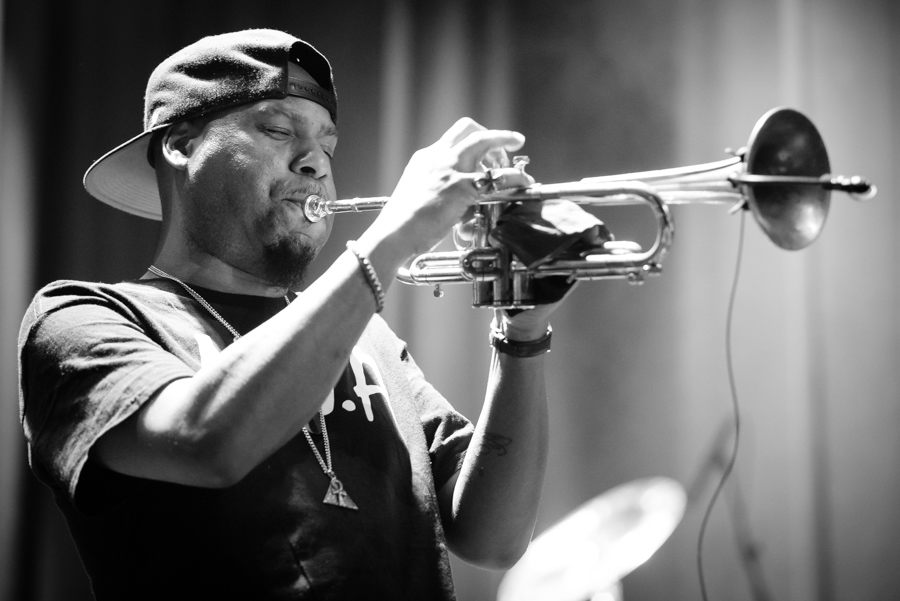
- Gunn performing in Oslo, 2018

Background information
- Born: October 20, 1971 (age 55); Chicago, Illinois, U.S.
- Genre: Jazz
- Occupation: Musician
- Instrument: Trumpet
- Years active: 1994–present
- Member of: Bionic; Elektrik Butterfly; Blackhawk Quintet; Dionne Farris & Russell Gunn Quintet; Krunk Jazz Orchestra

Russell Gunn (born October 20, 1971, in Chicago) is an American contemporary jazz trumpeter.

He grew up in East St. Louis, Illinois, playing the trumpet. As a kid, his musical interest was hip-hop, with LL Cool J being his first music idol. His projects include a large ensemble called Bionic, which released the album Krunk Jazz, and his smaller group, Elektrik Butterfly.

== Discography ==
=== As leader ===
- 1995: Young Gunn (Muse)
- 1997: Gunn Fu (HighNote)
- 1998: Young Gunn Plus (32 Jazz)
- 1999: Love Requiem (HighNote)
- 1999: Ethnomusicology, Vol. 1 (Atlantic)
- 2000: Smokin' Gunn (HighNote)
- 2001: Ethnomusicology, Vol. 2 (Justin Time)
- 2002: Blue on the D.L. (HighNote)
- 2003: Ethnomusicology, Vol. 3 (Justin Time)
- 2003: Mood Swings (HighNote)
- 2004: Ethnomusicology, Vol. 4: Live in Atlanta (Justin Time)
- 2006: Russell Gunn Presents... Bionic: Krunk Jazz (Groid Music 001)
- 2007: Plays Miles (HighNote)
- 2008: Love Stories (HighNote)
- 2010: Ethnomusicology, Vol. 6: Return of Gunn Fu (Groid Music 002)
- 2013: Russell Gunn & Elektrik Butterfly: Elektrik Funeral (Hot Shoe Music)
- 2016: Le Mystere de Sirius (The Sirius Mystery) (Groid Music 003)
- 2018: The Royal Krunk Jazz Orkestra: Get It How You Live (Ropeadope)
- 2019: The Royal Krunk Jazz Orkestra: Pyramids: Opus 4, No. 2 (Ropeadope)
- 2021: The Royal Krunk Jazz Orkestra: The Sirius Mystery: Opus 4, No. 1 (Ropeadope)[EP]
- 2024: Russell Gunn & Blackhawk: Origin Story (Vanglorious)

=== As co-leader/sideman ===
- 1994: Oliver Lake, Dedicated to Dolphy (Black Saint)
- 1994: Wynton Marsalis, Blood on the Fields (Columbia)
- 1997: Carlos Garnett, Under Nubian Skies (HighNote)
- 1997: Buckshot LeFonque, Music Evolution (Columbia)
- 1997: Bruce Williams, Brotherhood (Savant)
- 2026: Faye Carol, Faye Sings the Blues (Getdown)
