= Hot House Flowers (album) =

Studio album by Wynton Marsalis
- Released: December 18, 1984
- Recorded: May 30–31, 1984
- Studio: RCA Studio A, New York
- Genre: Jazz
- Length: 41:33
- Label: Columbia
- Producer: George Butler, Steven Epstein

Wynton Marsalis chronology
Baroque Music for Trumpet (1984)	Hot House Flowers (1984)	Black Codes (From the Underground) (1985)

Hot House Flowers is an album by Wynton Marsalis that won the Grammy Award for Best Jazz Instrumental Performance, Soloist in 1985. The album peaked at number 90 on the Billboard 200, number 53 on the Billboard R&B Albums chart, and number 1 on the Top Jazz Albums chart.

Professional ratings
Review scores
Source	Rating
The Penguin Guide to Jazz Recordings	3/4 stars
The Rolling Stone Jazz Record Guide	3/5 stars

== Track listing ==
No.	Title	Writer(s)	Length
1.	"Stardust"	Hoagy Carmichael, Mitchell Parish	4:07
2.	"Lazy Afternoon"	Jerome Moross, John Latouche	5:03
3.	"For All We Know"	John Frederick Coots, Sam M. Lewis	6:15
4.	"When You Wish upon a Star"	Ned Washington, Leigh Harline	4:40
5.	"Django"	John Lewis	4:52
6.	"Melancholia"	Duke Ellington	5:46
7.	"Hot House Flowers"	Wynton Marsalis	5:46
8.	"I'm Confessin' (That I Love You)"	Al J. Neiburg, Doc Daugherty, Ellis Reynolds	5:41

== Personnel ==
- Wynton Marsalis – trumpet
- Branford Marsalis – soprano and tenor saxophones
- Kent Jordan – alto flute
- Paul McCandless - oboe, English horn
- Andrew Schwartz - bassoon
- Peter Gordon - French horn
- Tony Price - tuba
- Kenny Kirkland – piano
- Ron Carter – double bass
- Jeff "Tain" Watts – drums
- Charles Libove (concertmaster), Ingrid Arden, Peter Dimitriades, Gayle Dixon, Guillermo Figueroa, Winterton Garvey, Harry Glickman, Regis Iandiorio, Ray Kunicki, Patmore Lewis, Diane Monroe, Louann Montesi - violins
- Al Brown, Theodore Israel, Mitsue Takayama, Harry Zaratzian - violas
- Seymour Barab, Richard Locker, Alvin McCall, Frederick Zlotkin - cellos
- Bob Freedman - arranger, orchestrator and conductor
