= I Heard You Twice the First Time =

Studio album by Branford Marsalis
- Released: September 1992
- Genre: Jazz
- Length: 79:02
- Label: Sony
- Producer: Delfeayo Marsalis and Branford Marsalis

Branford Marsalis chronology
The Beautyful Ones Are Not Yet Born (1991)	I Heard You Twice the First Time (1992)	Bloomington (1993)

I Heard You Twice the First Time is a jazz album by Branford Marsalis that explores different aspects of the blues, featuring guest appearances from B.B. King, John Lee Hooker, Russell Malone, Wynton Marsalis and Linda Hopkins. It peaked at number 1 on the Top Jazz Albums chart. The album won the Grammy Award for Best Jazz Instrumental Performance, Individual or Group.

== Reception ==
Professional ratings
Review scores
Source	Rating
AllMusic	3/5 stars
Entertainment Weekly	B−
The Penguin Guide to Jazz Recordings	3/4 stars

In his AllMusic review, Scott Yanow calls the album "interesting if erratic," specifically identifying the performance by Linda Hopkins and concluding that this is an "intriguing set that is worth picking up." People praised the album, calling out the "four distinct blues-guitar styles" and the "verve and execution" of the quartet numbers as high points. Entertainment Weekly characterized Marsalis as "a commanding, even great, saxophonist of the post-hard-bop school, but a wayward conceptualist," and criticized the album as suffering from a "serious identity crisis."

== Track listing ==
All tracks are written by Branford Marsalis, except where indicated.

No.	Title	Writer(s)	Length
0.	Untitled	Branford Marsalis, Jeff Watts, Robert Hurst
1.	"Brother Trying to Catch a Cab (On the East Side)"	Robert Hurst	9:05
2.	"B.B.'s Blues"	B.B. King, Branford Marsalis	10:07
3.	"Rib Tip Johnson"		9:19
4.	"Mabel"	John Lee Hooker	6:47
5.	"Sidney in da Haus"		6:32
6.	"Berta, Berta"	Public Domain	5:28
7.	"Stretto from the Ghetto"	J. Watts	7:15
8.	"Dance of the Hei Gui"		5:32
9.	"The Road You Choose"	Branford Marsalis, Joe Louis Walker	6:23
10.	"Simi Valley Blues"		3:10

== Personnel ==
- Branford Marsalis – Tenor, Alto and Soprano Saxophones, Vocals
- Kenny Kirkland – Piano
- Jeff "Tain" Watts – Drums
- Robert Hurst – Bass
- B.B. King – Guitar, Vocals
- Russell Malone – Guitar
- Reginald Veal – Bass
- Herlin "Homey" Riley – Drums
- John Lee Hooker – Guitar, Vocals
- Wessel Anderson – Alto Saxophone
- Wynton Marsalis – Trumpet
- David Sagher – Trombone
- Joe Louis Walker – Guitars
- Earl Gardner – Trumpet
- Delfeayo Marsalis – Trombone
- Bernard Purdie – Drums
- T-Blade – Guitar
- Linda Hopkins – Vocals
- Thomas Hollis – Vocals
- Roscoe Carroll – Vocals
- Carl Gordon – Vocals
- Charles Dutton – Vocals
- Dwight Anderson – Musical Consultant, Conductor (Berta, Berta)
