= Frank McComb =

- Born: July 15, 1970 (age 56); Cleveland, Ohio
- Genres: R&B, jazz, gospel, soul
- Occupations: Singer, songwriter
- Instruments: Piano, vocals
- Years active: 1990–present
- Labels: MoJazz, Columbia, Malibu Sessions, Boobescoot
- Website: https://frankmccombmusic.com/

Frank McComb (born July 15, 1970) is an American singer and record producer. He has collaborated with Prince, Chaka Khan, Will Smith, Najee, Branford Marsalis, George Duke, Frankie Beverly & Maze, Phyllis Hyman, Gamble and Huff, Patrice Rushen, Lalah Hathaway, Fred Hammond, and John P. Kee.

== Biography ==
=== Early career ===
Frank McComb began his career in February 1983 when an aunt began teaching him piano at the family church. Though he did attend a school for the performing arts in the mid-1980s, he found more recognition playing Cleveland nightclubs with seasoned musicians. By 1988, McComb was in high school fronting his own trio.

After graduating from Glenville High School in Cleveland, McComb was asked to be in the band for Atlantic Records male R&B singing group The Rude Boys, protégés of Gerald Levert. He was soon promoted to musical director and toured with them through the early 1990s. While touring, McComb met Jeff Townes of seminal rap duo DJ Jazzy Jeff & The Fresh Prince who invited him to record and tour with the group. Townes eventually convinced Frank to move to Philadelphia. Once settled, he was introduced to legendary songwriting duo Kenny Gamble and Leon Huff. McComb was eventually put on payroll as a musician for Gamble/Huff and moved down the street from their headquarters so that he could walk to work every day.

=== Signing with Motown ===
While working for Gamble & Huff, a chance encounter with future president of Motown Records Steve McKeever led to McComb's first record deal. At the time, McKeever was scouting for a new jazz-oriented Motown imprint called MoJazz. The contract was signed on the strength of one live performance and an admittedly poor recording of a song called "Time and Time Again."

Subsequently, McComb shifted his home to Los Angeles to accommodate his new label. However, after recording two albums of unreleased material, and recording two songs for the soundtrack to the 1993 film The Meteor Man, he sought a release from his contract. "It was nothing personal...just politics and money which caused me to get lost in the shuffle," Frank states.

=== Signing with Columbia ===
Following the defunct contract with MoJazz, McComb toured as a musician for Teena Marie and Phillip Bailey, until getting word that Branford Marsalis was looking for a male vocalist for a new band he was beginning. A song called "Mona Lisas and Mad Hatters" secured him the gig, making him an official member of Buckshot LeFonque. McComb later discovered that it was Steve McKeever who recommended him for the project.

While with Buckshot LeFonque, McComb recorded and toured worldwide in support of two critically acclaimed albums: 1994's debut Buckshot LeFonque and the 1997 follow-up Music Evolution. This momentum led to a solo recording contract with Columbia Records. In summer of 1999, he began recording what would become his debut album Love Stories, released on March 14, 2000.

The 14-track set produced by both McComb and Branford Marsalis was entirely self-penned with the exception of the bookending covers of the gospel staple "His Eye Is On The Sparrow," and the jazz standard "Some Other Time." Though the album was a solid effort and remains a fan favorite, its sales suffered from lack of support and record company politics. Eventually, McComb asked to be released from his contract.

=== Going independent ===
Once free, McComb, wary of his past experience with major record companies, signed next to the independent label Malibu Sessions in 2002. McComb states, "I felt that maybe I needed to be with an independent company, a smaller company that would be able to give more time and dedication to their artists."

2003 saw the release of Frank's first independent set, The Truth. The set was produced by Steve Harvey, producer of Donnie's widely lauded The Colored Section. The Truth also featured contributions from Billy Preston, Ledisi, and percussion master Paulinho Da Costa. Though the album was desperately sought after in America, it was only licensed for release through Expansion Records in England and Toy's Factory in Japan. The set was eventually made available stateside through iTunes in 2004.

For his next release, McComb took the reins to deliver Straight From The Vault in 2005. The 12-track collection of both vocal and instrumental compositions was entirely self-written and self-produced. Moreover, the album was released through his own label Boobescoot Music, putting McComb in complete control of his recordings for the first time in his career. The move paid off, as the set won the SoulTracks Readers Choice Awards for Best Album (2005)

Frustrated by fan reports that his early work at MoJazz was being sold for exorbitant amounts on the black market, McComb took steps to release the recordings himself. In 2006, Malibu/Expansion Records Sessions released what would have been McComb's MoJazz debut as The Truth, Volume 2. This set has also circulated in multiple markets under the title The 1995 Bootleg, as well as The Motown Sessions.

His first entirely solo foray into instrumental music was his next release, A Tribute To The Masters. Each song is a tribute to such jazz luminaries as Chick Corea, Patrice Rushen, Ramsey Lewis, Herbie Hancock, George Duke, Russell Ferrante and Joe Sample.

In 2007, Frank McComb released the concert recording Live In Atlanta in both CD and DVD formats. Though all of McComb's previous recordings were available on iTunes at the time of this album's release, the Live in Atlanta collection remains available only through his official website.

== Discography ==
- Love Stories (Columbia, 2000)
- The Truth (Malibu Sessions/Expansion, 2003)
- Straight from the Vault (Boobeescoot Music, 2005)
- The 1995 Bootleg (Boobeescoot, 2006)
- Tribute to the Masters (Boobeescoot, 2006)
- Live in Atlanta (Boobeescoot/Platinum, 2007)
- A New Beginning (Boobeescoot/Platinum, 2010)
