= Kenny Kirkland (album) =

Studio album by Kenny Kirkland
- Released: October 1, 1991
- Studio: BMG Studios A & B, RPM Studios and Marathon Studios (New York City, New York)
- Genre: Jazz, post-bop
- Length: 60:58
- Label: GRP Records
- Producer: Delfeayo Marsalis; Kenny Kirkland

Professional ratings
Review scores
Source	Rating
AllMusic	4.5/5 stars

Kenny Kirkland is the debut solo album by pianist Kenny Kirkland.

== Track listing ==
All tracks composed by Kenny Kirkland, except where noted.

1. "Mr. J. C." - 8:07
2. "Midnight Silence" - 3:32
3. "El Rey" (Jeff "Tain" Watts) - 1:35
4. "Steepian Faith" - 6:03
5. "Celia" (Bud Powell) - 6:49
6. "Chance" - 6:01
7. "When Will The Blues Leave" (Ornette Coleman) - 5:39
8. "Ana Maria" (Wayne Shorter) - 8:36
9. "Revelations" - 7:48
10. "Criss Cross" (Thelonious Monk) - 5:19
11. "Blasphemy" - 3:04
12. "Yes or No" (Wayne Shorter) - 6:40

== Personnel ==
- Kenny Kirkland – acoustic piano (1, 2, 4, 6–10), keyboards (5, 11)
- Charnett Moffett – bass (1, 4, 7)
- Christian McBride – bass (6)
- Andy González – bass (8, 10)
- Robert Hurst – bass (9)
- Jeff "Tain" Watts – drums (1–4, 6, 7, 9)
- Steve Berrios – drums (8, 10)
- Don Alias – percussion (5, 11), bongos (8)
- Jerry Gonzalez – congas (8, 10), percussion (8, 10)
- Branford Marsalis – tenor saxophone (1, 10), soprano saxophone (2, 4, 9)
- Roderick Ward – alto saxophone (7)

=== Production ===
- Ricky Schultz – executive album producer
- Dave Grusin – executive producer
- Larry Rosen – executive producer
- Kenny Kirkland – producer
- Delfeayo Marsalis – producer, digital editing
- Patrick Smith – recording, mixing
- Dave Kingsley – additional recording (5)
- Mike Krowiak – additional mixing (10)
- Suzanne Dyer – assistant engineer
- José "Canseco" Fernandez – assistant engineer
- Sandy Palmer – assistant engineer
- Joseph Doughney – post-production
- Michael Landy – post-production, digital editing
- The Review Room (New York City, New York) – post-production location
- Ted Jensen – mastering at Sterling Sound (New York City, New York)
- Michelle Lewis – GRP production coordinator
- Andy Baltimore – GRP creative director
- David Gibb – graphic design
- Scott Johnson – graphic design
- Sonny Mediana – graphic design
- Andy Ruggirello – graphic design
- Dan Serrano – graphic design
- Carol Weinberg – photography
- Roxanna Floyd – hair, make-up
- Debra Autrey – stylist
- AMG International – management
