= The Healers (novel) =

1979 novel by Ayi Kwei Armah

The Healers is a novel by Ayi Kwei Armah. It was Armah's fifth novel which was published in 1979.
