= Crazy People Music =

Studio album by Branford Marsalis
- Released: July 1990
- Recorded: January 10, February 18 & March 1, 1990
- Genre: Jazz
- Length: 64:32
- Label: Sony
- Producer: Delfeayo Marsalis

Branford Marsalis chronology
Mo' Better Blues (1990)	Crazy People Music (1990)	The Beautyful Ones Are Not Yet Born (1991)

Crazy People Music is a jazz album featuring the Branford Marsalis Quartet, led by saxophonist Branford Marsalis and featuring Kenny Kirkland, Jeff "Tain" Watts, and Robert Hurst. It was recorded January 10, February 18, and March 1, 1990, at RCA Studios in New York, New York. It peaked at number 3 on the Top Jazz Albums chart. It was nominated for a Grammy Award in 1990 for Best Jazz Instrumental Performance, Soloist.

== Critical reception ==
Professional ratings
Review scores
Source	Rating
AllMusic	4/5 stars
The Penguin Guide to Jazz Recordings	3/4 stars
Select	2/5

Scott Yanow notes in his AllMusic review, "It's an impressive group… ['The Ballad of Chet Kincaid'] would catch on to a general audience, but on the others Marsalis is heard throughout in prime form, sounding more original and pushing himself."

Several critics point to Crazy People Music as a turning point for Marsalis. Nate Chinen of JazzTimes called the album the "first major statement" of Marsalis's new quartet, and Paul Wells wrote in 2014 that the album was when "the band's vision coalesced." Marsalis himself notes, "Crazy People Music was kind of a breakthrough record. We were starting to pull away from the typical post-bop stuff. We weren't really free of it yet…"

== Track listing ==
All tracks are written by Branford Marsalis, except where noted.

No.	Title	Writer(s)	Length
1.	"Spartacus"		8:36
2.	"The Dark Knight"	Robert Hurst	12:47
3.	"Wolverine"		10:42
4.	"Mr. Steepee"		6:18
5.	"Rose Petals"	Keith Jarrett	11:11
6.	"Random Abstract (Diddle-It)"		9:19
7.	"The Ballad of Chet Kincaid (Hikky Burr)"	Bill Cosby, Quincy Jones	5:41

== Personnel ==
- Branford Marsalis - saxophones
- Jeff "Tain" Watts - drums
- Robert Hurst - bass
- Kenny Kirkland - piano
