= Black Codes (From the Underground) =

Studio album by Wynton Marsalis
- Released: June 9, 1985
- Recorded: January 7–11, 14, 1985
- Genre: Post-bop
- Length: 50:41
- Label: Columbia
- Producer: Steven Epstein, George Butler

Wynton Marsalis chronology
Hot House Flowers (1984)	Black Codes (From the Underground) (1985)	Tomasi, Jolivet: Trumpet Concertos (1986)

Professional ratings
Review scores
Source	Rating
AllMusic	5/5 stars
The Penguin Guide to Jazz Recordings	4/4 stars

Black Codes (From the Underground) is a 1985 album by jazz trumpeter Wynton Marsalis.

== Accolades and legacy ==
It won two Grammy Awards in 1986: Best Instrumental Jazz Performance, Individual or Group and Best Jazz Instrumental Performance, Soloist. The album was selected by the Library of Congress for preservation in the National Recording Registry in 2023 describing it as one of Wynton's "most beloved & artistically successful recordings, hearkening back to midcentury acoustic jazz but with a distinctly 1980s flair".

== Track listing ==
All tracks are written by Wynton Marsalis except where noted.

No.	Title	Writer(s)	Length
1.	"Black Codes"		9:31
2.	"For Wee Folks"		9:06
3.	"Delfeayo's Dilemma"		6:46
4.	"Phryzzinian Man"		6:44
5.	"Aural Oasis"		5:35
6.	"Chambers of Tain"	Kenny Kirkland	7:38
7.	"Blues"		5:21

== Personnel ==
- Wynton Marsalis – trumpet
- Branford Marsalis – tenor saxophone, soprano saxophone
- Kenny Kirkland – piano
- Charnett Moffett – double bass
- Jeff "Tain" Watts – drums
- Ron Carter - bass on "Aural Oasis"

Technical

- Steven Epstein – producer
- George Butler – executive producer
- Tim Geelan – chief engineer, remix engineer
- Stanley Crouch – liner notes
