= Renaissance (Branford Marsalis album) =

Studio album by Branford Marsalis
- Released: 1987
- Genre: Jazz
- Label: Columbia
- Producer: Delfeayo Marsalis

Branford Marsalis chronology
| Royal Garden Blues (1986) | Renaissance (1987) | Random Abstract (1988) |

Renaissance is an album by the American musician Branford Marsalis, released in 1987. It peaked at No. 4 on Billboard's Traditional Jazz Albums chart. Marsalis supported the album with a North American tour.

== Production ==
The album was produced by Delfeayo Marsalis. Branford Marsalis played tenor and soprano saxophones. Tony Williams played drums; Bob Hurst played bass. "St. Thomas" is a version of the Sonny Rollins song performed solo by Marsalis. "The Peacocks" was written by Jimmy Rowles; Herbie Hancock played piano on the track. "Lament" was composed by J. J. Johnson.

== Critical reception ==
Professional ratings
Review scores
| Source | Rating |
|---|---|
| AllMusic | 4/5 stars |
| Los Angeles Times | 4/5 stars |
| The Penguin Guide to Jazz on CD | 3/4 stars |
| The Rolling Stone Album Guide | 3.5/5 stars |
| Windsor Star | A− |

The Washington Post praised the "gorgeous arrangement of Jimmy Rowles' 'The Peacocks', which deftly combines Marsalis' sinuous soprano sax and pianist Herbie Hancock's impressionistic colors." The St. Petersburg Times deemed Renaissance "a straight-ahead, acoustic jazz album," writing that "Branford is perhaps a bit more facile on soprano but his tenor playing is hearty and nimble." The Globe and Mail determined that "the saxophonist's melodic, laid-back approach gives his solos a graceful, coasting quality and the casualness is endearing." The Windsor Star stated that "Marsalis and pianist Kenny Kirkland keep a firm grip on developing solos in shapely fashion, a highstepping but sinewy dance."

== Track listing ==
| No. | Title | Length |
|---|---|---|
| 1. | "Just One of Those Things" |
| 2. | "Lament" |
| 3. | "The Peacocks" |
| 4. | "Love Stone" |
| 5. | "Citadel" |
| 6. | "The Wrath (Structured Burnout)" |
| 7. | "St. Thomas" |
