= Osiris Rising =

Book by Ayi Kwei Armah

- Author: Ayi Kwei Armah
- Cover artist: R. M. Osotsi
- Language: English
- Genre: Novel
- Publisher: Per Ankh
- Publication date: 1995
- Publication place: Senegal
- Media type: Print (Paperback)
- Pages: 348
- ISBN: 2-911928-00-8
- OCLC: 256475128

Osiris Rising: A Novel of Africa Past, Present and Future is a novel written by Ayi Kwei Armah and published in 1995. The story revolves around an African-American woman, Ast, who goes to Africa looking for heritage after she gets her PhD. The text addresses a number of contemporary African issues, including the residual colonial institutions that limit African culture, the hypocritical nature of African Americans and expatriates who try to help Africa and the contemplation of "What is African history and culture?" The book is published by Per Ankh, a Senegalese publishing company.

== Characters ==
Many of Osiris Rising's characters appear one-dimensional and ludicrous, almost "puppet-like". Ast, the main character, seems the most credible and developed among the characters, yet even her psychology in the interactions with Seth can become absurd. At best the characters, act as principles representing further exploration of the book's themes. The following are the book's main characters:

- Ast - an African American, who has received her PhD in history, then decides to travel to Africa to trace her roots. She also was taught by her grandmother in hieroglyphics since her childhood.
- Asar - a literature professor with strong ideals of what Africa should be and how to achieve a more progressive African politics and society. While he attended college with Seth and Ast, he was the top of his class, however when he completed his graduate schooling he left for Africa in order to participate in the fight against apartheid.
- Ras Cinque Jomo Equiano - a former civil-rights activist named Sheldon Tubman, who moves to Africa to get more in touch with the "African experience", but instead forms a cult around himself and abuses his power to gain a number of followers, including three wives.
- Seth Soja - sometimes called SSS or DD, Soja is the deputy director of the country's security force. He controls the ultimate power in the country. When at school with Ast and Seth, he was always jealous of Asar's educational success.

== Setting ==
Armah sets the story in a contemporary unnamed West African country. A majority of the story takes place on the campus of Manda's Teachers' College, where Asar and Ast both teach and many of their agendas come to fruition.

== Thematic elements ==
As the title implies, Armah transposes the ancient Egyptian Osiris myth into modern Africa. This first becomes evident when Armah names each chapter using Egyptian words. The main characters closely align with the major movers of the myth: the reforming Asar identifying with Osiris, Asar's companion, Ast, portrayed as Isis, and Soya representing Set.

The relationship between Ast and Asar reflects a Pan-African model of uniting both the African American with no ethnic tribe and the native African who clearly identifies with a single village. This represents a similar relationship to that between an Afro-Caribbean man and an African women in Armah's novel Fragments. This relationship, one of love and commitment that works fervently for the emancipation of African thought, helps reinforce Armah's message of pan-African cooperation.

Armah presents a very critical view of the character Sheldon Tubman. He portrays this character, a strong civil-rights activist in the state, as nothing more than a "Diaspora Hustler" - someone who makes a big deal of returning to the African tradition but instead uses this fake "tradition" to benefit himself. Anne Adams, in her comparison of the two authors' repertoires in "Literary Pan-Africanism", identifies this as a position also strongly expressed by Guadeloupean Maryse Condé.

== Critical reception ==
Osiris Rising has been reviewed by a handful of world literature scholars in institutions that provide a western education:

Andrew Perrin of UCLA comments "Artistically the book leaves something to be desired as well," however, "Ayi Kwei Armah is an astute observer and analyst of Africa's contemporary conditions." However, he says that Ast and Asar's intellectual movement to change the political situation is almost "inspiring, even hopeful."

Derek Wright comments that "This powerful and searching novel is not without its weaknesses... it makes unexciting fiction." To better explain this he says "Osiris Rising is very low on both dramatic incident and psychological intensity." Wright, though he acknowledges the book is principally "to explore the real, albeit restricted, options for change open to Africa's inventive and radical thinkers", feels that much of the book is largely undeveloped: lacking development in character dynamics, the context of the state, and the characters themselves.

== See also ==
For individuals using a similar definition of the culture and history of Africa:

- Cheikh Anta Diop
- Theophile Obenga
