= Two Thousand Seasons =

1979 novel by Ayi Kwei Armah

Two thousand seasons
- Cover of paperback edition published by Third World Press
- Author: Ayi Kwei Armah
- Language: English
- Genre: Fiction
- Publisher: Heinemann Educational Books; First Edition
- Publication date: January 1, 1979
- Publication place: Ghana
- Pages: 206
- ISBN: 978-0435902186

Two Thousand Seasons is a novel by Ghanaian novelist Ayi Kwei Armah. The novel was first published in 1973 and subsequently published a number of times, including in the influential Heinemann African Writers Series. It is an epic historical novel, attempting to depict the last "two thousand seasons" of African history in one narrative arc following a Pan-African approach.

== Themes ==
The novel focuses on the complicity of African people in the enslavement of their people to intruders, first represented as Arabs then later as European whites. In doing so, the novel emphasizes the continued complicitness of African leaders in furthering the oppression of other African peoples. For Armah, the intervention of outside cultures violates a past "African ideal [...] egalitarian philosophy" which can help guide the recovery of, what critic Chinyere Nwahunanya calls a "lost African Eden".

== Reception ==
Criticism of the novel is mixed. Chinua Achebe, in a 1987 interview, described Two Thousand Seasons as "unacceptable on the basis of fact, and on the basis of art. The work is ponderous and heavy and wooden, almost embarrassing in its heaviness."

The reviewing site Complete Review gave the novel a B+ rating, noting that it is an "often strong but ultimately too simplistic picture of Africa -- past and future". The review focuses on Armah's oversimplification of the African continent's "actual sad history".

Gloria Steinem in a 2016 article for T: The New York Times Style Magazine chose Two Thousand Seasons as one of her 10 favourite books and said of Ayi Kwei Armah: "He not only redefines history, but how history is told."
