= The Beautyful Ones Are Not Yet Born =

1968 debut novel by Ayi Kwei Armah

- First edition
- Author: Ayi Kwei Armah
- Language: English
- Publisher: Houghton Mifflin
- Publication date: 1968
- Publication place: Ghana

The Beautyful Ones Are Not Yet Born is the debut novel by Ghanaian writer Ayi Kwei Armah. It was published in 1968 by Houghton Mifflin, and then republished in the influential Heinemann African Writers Series in 1969. The novel tells the story of an unnamed man who struggles to reconcile himself with the reality of post-independence Ghana.

== Plot ==
The Beautyful Ones Are Not Yet Born focuses on life in post-independence Ghana and takes place between Passion Week in 1965 and February 25, 1966 (the day after the overthrow of Kwame Nkrumah, Ghana’s first president).

Working as a railway clerk, the unnamed protagonist refuses a bribe at work. On his way home, he runs into his old classmate Koomson, who is now a corrupt minister in Nkrumah’s government. Upon returning home, he is confronted by his wife, Oyo, who does not understand why the man refuses to participate in financial dealings which would better their family’s life. Oyo comments on a deal Koomson has mentioned to her involving fishing boats that she believes will make their family rich. The man feels guilty, even though he knows that he hasn’t done anything wrong. He slips out at night to meet with his friend Teacher, who helps him to discuss his feelings of guilt and shame. Teacher, although he has given up all hope himself, encourages the man to remain steadfast. The next day, the man goes to work and encounters many forms of bodily waste—including excrement and vomit—as well as physical environments which are molding and deteriorating. Later, the man goes to buy expensive imported food for a dinner he and Oyo are hosting for Koomson and his wife, Estie. Even though he cannot easily afford the food, he is filled with happiness and satisfaction that he can own such things—and garner admiring looks from the other people in the shops. For once, he feels satisfied with himself.

The man and Oyo clean their house in preparation for the dinner party. The man takes his children to his mother-in-law’s house for a break and is subjected to his mother-in-law’s disappointment in his refusal to become a man like Koomson. During the dinner party, the man notes how much his old classmate has changed—his hands are flabby and soft, and he refuses to use their latrine. Koomson reveals that the fishing boat deal is not intended to provide any profits to Oyo and the man’s family—Koomson needs a signature to mask his involvement in the corrupt money-making scheme, and in return, they imply that Oyo and the man will receive fish.

Koomson and Estie return a dinner invitation to Oyo and the man. The man is once again bombarded with feelings of guilt and shame when he sees the material differences between his children’s lives and that of Koomson’s daughter, Princess. He chooses not to sign the fishing boat deal, but Oyo signs the documents.

The fishing boat deal turns out to be largely inconsequential to their lives—for a while, they receive packets of fish, but only for a short period. One day, the man leaves work only to learn that there has been a military coup, and Nkrumah’s government ministers are being arrested and placed under protective custody. When he reaches home, he finds Koomson waiting for him, asking for help. Men arrive at the house looking for Koomson, but the man helps him to escape by crawling through the latrine which he had previously refused to use. They find the boatman, who takes them out on the fishing boat that Oyo’s signature had helped make a reality. Once they clear the harbor, the man prepares to jump into the bay. Koomson tells him that they will meet again someday, but the man finds this childish and leaves without feeling much for Koomson. He swims to shore and falls asleep on the beach.

When he wakes up, he sees Sister Maanan, a friend from his past, but she does not acknowledge him. As he walks home, the man sees a bus with an inscription on the side matching the title of the book. This, along with an illustration alongside it of a beautiful flower, gives him a momentary feeling of hope for future generations. But when he remembers the day-to-day drudgery of the life to which he must return, he falters and walks more slowly towards home.

== Critical reception ==
First published in 1968 by Houghton Mifflin in the US (where the author studied at Columbia University, 1968–70), The Beautyful Ones Are Not Yet Born received critical acclaim, with "generally favorable, and often glowing, reviews", as Jacob Littleton put it: "With this one book, Armah established himself as a writer with a worldwide reputation." Kirkus Reviews stated: "In the groping stretch between colonialism and a strong national identity one of the natural attitudes is a sour malaise. This young Ghanian [sic] author has caught the vanishing ends of two worlds in a bitter, acerbic novel of one man's spiritual trials in a new West African nation. ... A strong, tight, efficient novel--urgent and relevant." While occasionally some "judged it to be too strong for the general reader", among other reviewers, one wrote: "This is a brash and powerfully colorful novel, and if it amounts to doing the laundry in public, we can only say What a laundry! and What an heroic job at the scrub board!"

However, some African writers were less welcoming of the novel, with Chinua Achebe in particular concluding: "Armah is clearly an alienated writer complete with all the symptoms. Unfortunately Ghana is not a modern existentialist country. It is just a Western African state struggling to become a nation.

Armah himself notes, in a preface to a new edition of the novel published by his own publishing house, Per Ankh:

"It attracted considerable attention then, much of it focused on the author's perceived artistry. There was a tendency, from the beginning, to contrast this supposed authorial virtuosity with the novel's subject matter, rather inaccurately summed up as the pervasive negativity of the human condition in Africa. This bias didn't surprise me, and I assumed it would take little time for some careful scholar to balance it by zooming in on the conceptual content of the title, which I think expresses the meaning of the text as accurately as any title can. It is a matter of some bafflement to me, therefore, that to date, as far as I know, no critical assessment has actually gone to that thematic core: the provenance of the concept and image of the beautyful ones. The phrase 'The Beautiful One' is ancient, at least five thousand years old. To professional Egyptologists, it is a praise name for a central figure in Ancient Egyptian culture, the dismembered and remembered Osiris, a sorrowful reminder of our human vulnerability to division, fragmentation and degeneration, and at the same time a symbol of our equally human capacity for unity, cooperative action, and creative regeneration. ...

I remember no special attachment to the mythic figure in those days, but by the time I wrote the novel my impressions of Osiris, though still relatively disorganised, had evolved to the point where I was ready to recognise the image as a powerful artistic icon. Here, in mythic form, was the essence of active, innovative human intelligence acting as a prime motive force for social management. I have yet to come across an earlier, or more attractive, image for the urge to positive social change."

In 2022, The Beautyful Ones Are Not Yet Born was included on the Big Jubilee Read, a list of 70 books by Commonwealth authors produced to celebrate Queen Elizabeth II's Platinum Jubilee.

== Cultural references ==
Branford Marsalis recorded a 1991 jazz album of the same title.
