= Robert Hurst (musician) =

American jazz bassist (born 1964)

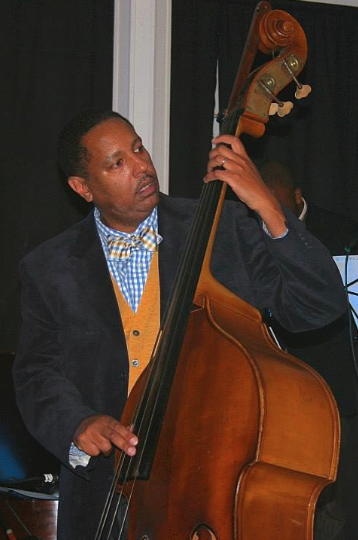
- Hurst performing at the University of Michigan in 2014

Background information
- Born: Robert L. Hurst, III; October 4, 1964 (age 61); Detroit, Michigan, U.S.
- Genres: Jazz
- Occupations: Musician; composer; educator
- Instruments: Double bass; bass guitar
- Years active: 1980–present
- Labels: Columbia; Sony Music; Bebop
- Website: roberthurst.com

Robert L. Hurst III (born October 4, 1964) is an American jazz bassist and educator.

== Biography ==
Hurst played guitar early in his career before concentrating on bass. He performed with the jazz group Out of the Blue in 1985 and also did work with musicians including Tony Williams, Mulgrew Miller, Harry Connick Jr., Geri Allen, Russell Malone, and Steve Coleman. From 1986 to 1991, Hurst played in Wynton Marsalis's ensemble and played with Branford Marsalis in the early 1990s. He was also a member of The Tonight Show Band with Jay Leno from 1992 to 1999. His 1993 debut as a leader, Robert Hurst Presents, reached No. 13 on the Billboard Top Jazz Albums chart. He currently teaches jazz bass at the University of Michigan.

Hurst has also recorded with a range of musicians that includes Paul McCartney, Charles Lloyd, Dave Brubeck, Terence Blanchard, Nicholas Payton, Sting, Carl Allen, Pharoah Sanders, Barbra Streisand, Willie Nelson, Yo-Yo Ma, Ravi Coltrane, Chris Botti, and Diana Krall.

Hurst has cited bassists Ray Brown and Ron Carter as influences.

== Discography ==
=== As leader ===
- Robert Hurst Presents: Robert Hurst (Columbia, 1992)
- One for Namesake (Sony, 1993)
- Unrehurst, Vol. 1 (Bebob, 2002)
- Unrehurst, Vol. 2 (Bebob, 2010)
- Bob Ya Head (Bebob, 2010)
- BoB: A Palindrome (Bebob, 2013)
- Black Current Jam (Dot Time, 2017)

=== As member ===
With Out of the Blue

- Out of the Blue (Blue Note, 1985)
- Inside Track (Blue Note, 1986)

=== As sideman ===
With Chris Botti

- To Love Again: The Duets (Columbia, 2005)
- Chris Botti in Boston (Decca, 2009)
- Impressions (Columbia, 2012)

With Donald Brown

- Early Bird (Sunnyside, 1988)
- People Music (Muse, 1991)

With Diana Krall

- Live at the Montreal Jazz Festival (Verve, 2004)
- Christmas Songs (Verve, 2005)
- Doing All Right: In Concert (Immortal, 2010)[DVD-Video]

With Ellis Marsalis Jr.

- Ellis Marsalis Trio (Blue Note, 1991)
- Whistle Stop (Columbia, 1994)

With Branford Marsalis

- Renaissance (Columbia, 1987)
- Crazy People Music (Sony, 1990)
- Music from Mo' Better Blues (Columbia, 1990)
- The Beautyful Ones Are Not Yet Born (Sony, 1991)
- I Heard You Twice the First Time (Sony, 1992)
- Bloomington (Sony Music, 1993)

With Wynton Marsalis

- J Mood (Columbia, 1986)
- Live at Blues Alley (Columbia, 1987)
- Marsalis Standard Time, Vol. I (Columbia, 1987)
- Thick in the South: Soul Gestures in Southern Blue, Vol. 1 (Columbia, 1988)
- Standard Time, Vol. 2: Intimacy Calling (Columbia, 1990)

With Greg Osby

- St. Louis Shoes (Blue Note, 2003)
- Public (Blue Note, 2004)

With others

- 1988: Harry Connick Jr., 20 (Columbia)
- 1989: Strata Institute, Cipher Syntax (JMT)
- 1989: Terumasa Hino, Bluestruck (Somethin' Else)
- 1989: Renee Rosnes, Face to Face (Somethin' Else)
- 1989: Ricky Ford, Hard Groovin' (Muse)
- 1989: Vincent Herring, Scene One (Somethin' Else)
- 1989: Marvin Smitty Smith, The Road Less Traveled (Concord Jazz)
- 1990: Mulgrew Miller, From Day to Day (Landmark)
- 1991: Kenny Kirkland, Kenny Kirkland (GRP)
- 1991: Geri Allen, The Nurturer (Blue Note)
- 1992: Dave Stryker, Guitar on Top (Ken Music)
- 1992: Russell Malone, Russell Malone (Columbia)
- 1992: Joe Gilman, Treasure Chest (Timeless)
- 1993: Bruce Barth, In Focus (Enja)
- 1994: Kevin Eubanks, Live at Bradley's (Blue Note)
- 1995: Vanessa Rubin, Vanessa Rubin Sings (Novus)
- 1996: Eric Reed, West Coast Jazz Summit (Mons)
- 1997: Medwyn Goodall, King Shaman (Oreade Music)
- 1997: Woody Shaw, Bemsha Swing (Blue Note)
- 1997: Dianne Reeves, That Day... (Blue Note)
- 1998: Dave Ellis, In the Long Run (Monarch)
- 1998: Lou Rawls, Seasons 4 U (Rawls & Brokaw)
- 2001: Keb' Mo', Big Wide Grin (Sony Wonder)
- 2001 John Beasley, Surfacing (Beasley Music)
- 2001: Paul Jackson Jr., The Power of the String (Blue Note)
- 2001: René Marie, Vertigo (MaxJazz)
- 2002: Buddy Montgomery, A Love Affair in Paris (Space Time)
- 2002: Jean Toussaint, Blue Black (Space Time)
- 2002: Terri Lyne Carrington, Jazz Is a Spirit (ACT)
- 2002: Bill Mobley, New Light (Space Time)
- 2002: Joe Louis Walker, Pasa Tiempo (Evidence)
- 2003: Ronald Muldrow, Mapenzi (Joh-Bev)
- 2003: Mike Clark, Summertime (JazzKey Music)
- 2004: Billy Cobham, The Art of Five (In+Out)
- 2005: Michael Bublé, It's Time (143)
- 2005: Charles Lloyd, Jumping the Creek (ECM)
- 2005: SFJAZZ Collective, SF Jazz Collective (Nonesuch)
- 2005: Bette Midler, Sings the Peggy Lee Songbook (Columbia)
- 2005: The New Sound Quartet, Summertime (Eighty-Eight's)
- 2006: Kenny Garrett, Beyond the Wall (Nonesuch)
- 2006: Scott Kinsey, Kinesthetics (Abstract Logix)
- 2007: Jill Scott, Collaborations (Hidden Beach)
- 2008: Yo-Yo Ma, Yo-Yo Ma & Friends: Songs of Joy & Peace (Sony Classical)
- 2009: Willie Nelson, American Classic (Blue Note)
- 2009: Barbra Streisand, Love Is the Answer (Columbia)
- 2010: Norah Jones, ... Featuring Norah Jones (Blue Note)
- 2012: Paul McCartney, Kisses on the Bottom (Hear Music)
- 2024: Kris Davis, Run the Gauntlet (Pyroclastic)

== Film and video ==
- 1988: Wynton Marsalis, Blues & Swing (CBS Music Video Enterprises)
- 1989, 1990, 1995: Spike Lee, Do the Right Thing, Mo' Better Blues, Clockers – soundtrack
- 1990–1994: Keenan Ivory Wayans, In Living Color (20th Century Fox Television) – features "Detroit Red" by Hurst (a dance bumper for the Fly Girls)
- 1992: Marco Williams, Without a Pass (Chanticleer Films; CableACE Award Nominee) – features compositions by Hurst
- 1992: Branford Marsalis, "B.B.'s Blues" (Sony Music)
- 1992: Chris Hegedus and D.A. Pennebaker, Branford Marsalis: The Music Tells You – title track "Roust About" composed by Robert Hurst (Sony Music; Jazz Hall of Fame Inductee)
- 1997: Bernie Casey, The Dinner (Acorn Productions)
- 1999: Rick Famuyiwa, The Wood (MTV Films production on Paramount Pictures)
- 2000: George Tillman Jr., Men of Honor
- 2000: Dogma (presentation; The Blue Lobster)
- 2001: Steven Soderbergh, Ocean's Eleven
- 2001: Norman Jewison, Dinner with Friends (HBO Films) – Hurst as musician, original score by Dave Grusin
- 2002: Rick Famuyiwa, Brown Sugar
- 2003: Paco Farias, Broken (short film; Horn of the Moon Productions)
- 2004: Steven Soderbergh, Ocean's Twelve
- 2005: George Clooney, Good Night, and Good Luck
- 2005: Live at the Montreal Jazz Festival with Diana Krall (Verve Music Group)
- 2005: Their Eyes Were Watching God (ABC)
- 2006: Steven Soderbergh, The Good German
- 2007: Steven Soderbergh, Ocean's Thirteen
- 2007: Happy Birthday Ella: A Tribute to the First Lady of Song (Great Performances on PBS)
- 2007: Mackie Austin Hard Road Home (HBO Green House Productions)
- 2009: Chris Botti in Boston (Sony Music Entertainment)
- 2011: Tamara Davis, Single Ladies (MTV Films on VH1)
- Paul Henning, The Beverly Hillbillies (CBS), "Been There Done That" – theme and soundtrack
- The Expendables (USC Independent Productions) – features "Brother Try 'n Catch a Cab on the East Side Blues" and "Simi Valley Blues" by Hurst
