= Ayi Kwei Armah =

Ghanaian writer (born 1939)

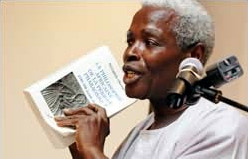
- Born: 28 October 1939 (age 86); Sekondi-Takoradi, Ghana
- Citizenship: Ghanaian
- Education: Prince of Wales College; Columbia University, Harvard University,
- Occupation: Writer
- Writing career
- Notable works: The Beautyful Ones Are Not Yet Born (1968); Two Thousand Seasons (1973); The Healers (1978)

Ayi Kwei Armah (born 28 October 1939) is a Ghanaian writer best known for his novels including The Beautyful Ones Are Not Yet Born (1968), Two Thousand Seasons (1973) and The Healers (1978). He is also an essayist, as well as having written poetry, short stories, and books for children.

== Early life and education ==
Ayi Kwei Armah was born in the port city of Sekondi-Takoradi in Ghana to Fante-speaking parents, descending on his father's side from a royal family in the Ga nation. From 1953 to 1958, Armah attended Prince of Wales College (now known as Achimota School), and won a scholarship to study in the United States, where he was between 1959 and 1963. He attended Groton School in Groton, MA, and then Harvard University, where he received a degree in sociology. He then moved to Algeria and worked as a translator for the magazine Révolution Africaine. In 1964, he returned to Ghana, where he was a scriptwriter for Ghana Television and later taught English at the Navrongo Secondary School.

Between 1967 and 1968, he was editor of Jeune Afrique magazine in Paris. From 1968 to 1970, Armah studied at Columbia University, obtaining his MFA in creative writing. His work in New York "on his second" novel and other writings was supported by "a grant" from the Farfield Foundation, a CIA front that supported many African artists and writers. In the 1970s, he worked as a teacher in East Africa, at the College of National Education, Chang'ombe, Tanzania, and at the National University of Lesotho. He subsequently taught at the University of Massachusetts in Amherst, Cornell University, and at the University of Wisconsin–Madison. He has lived in Dakar, Senegal, since the 1980s.

In the village of Popenguine, about 70 km from Dakar, he established his own publishing house, Per Ankh: the African Publication Collective, through which his own books are now available.

== Publications ==
Beginning his career as a writer in the 1960s, Armah published poems and short stories in the Ghanaian magazine Okyeame, and in Harper's Magazine, The Atlantic Monthly, and New African. His first novel, The Beautyful Ones Are Not Yet Born, was published in 1968, and tells the story of a nameless man who struggles to reconcile himself with the reality of post-independence Ghana. The novel has been widely discussed in Ghanaian and international media for its critical portrayal of post-independence disillusionment.

In Fragments (1970), the protagonist, Baako, is a "been-to" – a man who has been to the United States and received his education there. Back in Ghana he is regarded with superstitious awe as a link to the Western lifestyle. Baako's grandmother Naana, a blind-seer, stands in living contact with the ancestors. Under the strain of the unfulfilled expectations Baako finally breaks. As in his first novel, Armah contrasts the two worlds of materialism and moral values, corruption and dreams, two worlds of integrity and social pressure.

Why Are We So Blest? (1972) was set largely in an American university, and focused on a student, Modin Dofu, who has dropped out of Harvard. Disillusioned Modin is torn between independence and Western values. He meets a Portuguese black African named Solo, who has already suffered a mental breakdown, and a white American girl, Aimée Reitsch. Solo, the rejected writer, keeps a diary, which is the substance of the novel. Aimée's frigidity and devotion to the revolution leads finally to destruction, when Modin is killed in the desert by OAS revolutionaries.

The trans-Atlantic and African slave trades are the subject of Armah's Two Thousand Seasons (1973), in which a pluralized communal voice speaks through the history of Africa, its wet and dry seasons, over a period of one thousand years. Arab and European oppressors are portrayed as "predators", "destroyers", and "zombies". The novel is written in allegorical tone, and shifts from autobiographical and realistic details to philosophical pondering, prophesying a new age.

The Healers (1978) mixed fact and fiction about the fall of the Ashanti Empire. The healers in question are traditional medicine practitioners who see fragmentation as the lethal disease of Africa.

Armah remained silent as a novelist for a long period until 1995, when he published Osiris Rising, depicting a radical educational reform group that reinstates ancient Egypt at the centre of its curriculum.

Belonging to the generation of African writers after Chinua Achebe and Wole Soyinka, Armah has been said to "epitomize an era of intense despair." Armah's later work in particular has evoked strong reaction from many critics. While Two Thousand Seasons has been called dull and verbose, or the product of a "philosophy of paranoia, an anti-racist racism – in short, Negritude reborn" Soyinka has written that Armah's vision "frees itself of borrowed philosophies in its search for unifying, harmonizing ideal for a distinctive humanity."

As an essayist, Armah has dealt with the identity and predicament of Africa. His main concern is for the creation of a pan-African agency that will embrace all the diverse cultures and languages of the continent. Armah has advocated for the adoption of Kiswahili as Africa's continental language.

== Selected bibliography ==
Novels

- The Beautyful Ones Are Not Yet Born (Boston: Houghton Mifflin, 1968; London: Heinemann Educational Books, 1969, ISBN 978-0435906252; HEB paperback reprint, 1989, ISBN 978-0435905408)
- Fragments (Boston: Houghton Mifflin, 1970; London: Heinemann Educational Books, 1974; HEB paperback reprint, 1975, ISBN 978-0435901547)
- Why Are We So Blest? (New York: Doubleday, 1972; London: Heinemann Educational Books, 1974; HEB paperback reprint, 1985, ISBN 978-0435901554)
- Two Thousand Seasons (Nairobi: East African Publishing House, 1973; London: Heinemann Educational Books, 1979; Chicago: Third World Press, 1979)
- The Healers (Nairobi: East African Publishing House, 1978; London: Heinemann Educational Books, 1979, ISBN 978-0435906450; Popenguine, Senegal: Per Ankh, 2000)
- Osiris Rising (Popenguine, Senegal: Per Ankh, 1995)
- KMT: The House of Life (2002)
- The Resolutionaries (Per Ankh, 2013)

For children

- Hieroglyphics for Babies, Per Ankh, 2002 (with Aboubacry Mousa Lam)

Non-fiction

- The Eloquence of the Scribes: A Memoir on the Sources and Resources of African Literature, Popenguine, Senegal: Per Ankh, 2006
- Remembering the Dismembered Continent (essays), Per Ankh, 2010.

== See also ==
- African literature
