= Fire and Brimstone =

Fire and brimstone is an idiomatic expression of God's wrath in the Bible.

Fire and Brimstone or Fire & Brimstone may also refer to:

== Music ==
- Fire & Brimstone (album), a 2019 album by Brantley Gilbert
- "Fire and Brimstone", a song by Black Lungs on the 2008 album Send Flowers
- "Fire and Brimstone", a song by Bride on the 1988 album Live to Die
- "Fire and Brimstone", a song by Chris Bailey performed by The Saints on the 1988 album Prodigal Son
- "Fire and Brimstone", a song by rapper DJ Quik on the 2011 album The Book of David
- "Fire and Brimstone", a song by Dragonland on the 2011 album Under the Grey Banner
- "Fire and Brimstone", a song by Dropkick Murphys originally as a 1997 EP, re-released on the 2000 album The Singles Collection, Volume 1
- "Fire and Brimstone", a song by Link Wray on his eponymous 1971 album, Link Wray
- "Fire and Brimstone", a song by Troy "Trombone Shorty" Andrews on the 2013 album Say That to Say This

== Other uses ==
- Fire & Brimstone (Deadlands), a 1998 role-playing game supplement
- "Fire and Brimstone" (Rising Damp), a television episode
- The Order of Fire and Brimstone, an organizing board for the Vulcan Krewe in the Saint Paul Winter Carnival

== See also ==
- Brimstone (disambiguation)
- Fire (disambiguation)
- "Hellfire and Brimstone" (Ultimate X-Men), a story arc in Marvel Comics Ultimate X-Men series
