= Lawless (soundtrack) =

Lawless (Original Motion Picture Soundtrack)

Soundtrack album by Nick Cave, Warren Ellis, The Bootleggers and various artists
- Released: August 28, 2012
- Genres: Bluegrass; country music
- Length: 41:36
- Label: Sony Masterworks
- Producers: Dave Sardy; Hal Willner; Jim Schultz; Nick Cave; Warren Ellis

Nick Cave and Warren Ellis chronology
The Road (2009)	Lawless (2012)	West of Memphis (2012)

Lawless (Original Motion Picture Soundtrack) is the soundtrack album to the 2012 film Lawless directed by John Hillcoat, starring Shia LaBeouf, Tom Hardy, Gary Oldman, Mia Wasikowska, Jessica Chastain, Jason Clarke and Guy Pearce. The film score is composed by Nick Cave and Warren Ellis, in their third collaboration with Hillcoat.

Cave also wrote the film's screenplay, who had spotted several placeholders for the songs. He collaborated with his fellow musicians—David Sardy, George Vjestica, Martyn P. Casey—to form a fictional band called the Bootleggers, to produce bluegrass and country songs. The band performed few songs with Mark Lanegan, Emmylou Harris and Ralph Stanley, the latter performed two songs as a solo artist. The soundtrack was produced by the composers, Sardy along with Hal Willner and Jim Schultz.

The soundtrack was released through Sony Masterworks on August 28, 2012, in digital and physical formats. The music received positive reviews for the integration of songs in the screenplay, the musical performances and the composition. The song "Fire in the Blood" received a Satellite Award for Best Original Song.

== Development ==
In February 2011, it was announced that Nick Cave, who wrote the film's screenplay would also compose the musical score with his longtime collaborator Warren Ellis. With this, the duo collaborated with Hillcoat for the third time after The Proposition (2005) and The Road (2009). Hillcoat noted on Cave's collaboration as both screenwriter and composer, (Note: Cave also worked with Hillcoat on Ghosts... of the Civil Dead (1998) as a screenwriter and co-composer) adding that "The script is the starting point and the music is the end point, and for that to be [created by] one person is extra special".

Hillcoat was interested on sound and music, and there were a lot of discussions on how the score would be conceptualized. He found that the idea of writing relatively modern songs in a periodic setting suited the film's tonality, which recalled the events back in the 1930s still resonates today. They decided to work on the music together, with their fellow musicians, even though having minimal knowledge on bluegrass music, and they ended up getting a raw, brutal and punky sound, instead of following suits to the genre. They wanted to do with the similar approach for the songs as well. Cave wrote the screenplay spotting songs into the sequences and had deliberately written scenes that were stretched so that they could use a particular amount of music. Also they wanted to use tiny snatches of songs, to avoid distracting the audiences. Cave, noted that in the screenplay certain scenes were stretched to fit songs in there, but the way it was filmed has nothing to do with, as Hillcoat having a lyrical way of translating the script into a film and how the violence was conceptualized.

Cave and Ellis formed a fictional group called the Bootleggers, inviting several guest collaborators. Dave Sardy served as the album producer and music supervisor, selecting specific songs. They further collaborated with bluegrass singers Emmylou Harris, Mark Lanegan and Ralph Stanley as a part of the group. Regarding Stanley's involvement, Cave stated that he sent him a version of "White Light/White Heat" (1968, originally performed by the Velvet Underground) under his own vocals, though he denied singing it as it was much difficult. They again connected with the singer and his guitarist on Skype, where he insisted to cover Link Wray's "Fire and Brimstone", which he performed in 3/4 time, which was familiar for him, but the composers wanted him to do in 4/4 time signature. Eventually, with the help of Hal Willner, Stanley then recorded the songs in his own way. Cave noted that Willner came in contact with the band's principal musician-songwriter Lou Reed, and the composers played to him, which he got amazed with.

Cave also wrote few songs with Ellis, who admitted it as an intangible process where lyrics form from a personal and abstract thing. He recalled on how he spent six months on writing lyrics for the songs at his room throughout the day and that being a painful and mentally exhausting experience. The duo recorded the music at a small-scale studio in Brighton, with Martyn P. Casey, playing guitar.

== Track listing ==
No.	Title	Writer(s)	Artist	Length
1.	"Fire and Brimstone"	Fred Lincoln Wray Jr.	The Bootleggers feat. Mark Lanegan	4:27
2.	"Burnin' Hell"	Bernard Besman / John Lee Hooker	The Bootleggers feat. Nick Cave	1:56
3.	"Sure 'Nuff 'n Yes I Do"	Herb Bermann / Don Van Vliet	Ralph Stanley	1:27
4.	"Fire in the Blood"	Nick Cave & Warren Ellis	The Bootleggers feat. Emmylou Harris	1:10
5.	"White Light / White Heat"	Lou Reed	The Bootleggers feat. Mark Lanegan	4:24
6.	"Cosmonaut"		The Bootleggers feat. Emmylou Harris	3:42
7.	"Fire in the Blood / Snake Song"	Nick Cave & Warren Ellis / Townes Van Zandt	The Bootleggers feat. Ralph Stanley/Emmylou Harris	4:25
8.	"So You'll Aim Toward the Sky"	Jason Lytle	The Bootleggers feat. Emmylou Harris	5:57
9.	"Fire in the Blood"	Nick Cave & Warren Ellis	The Bootleggers feat. Emmylou Harris	1:06
10.	"Fire and Brimstone"		Ralph Stanley	2:12
11.	"Sure 'Nuff 'n Yes I Do"		The Bootleggers feat. Mark Lanegan	2:35
12.	"White Light / White Heat"	Lou Reed	Ralph Stanley	1:38
13.	"End Crawl"		Nick Cave & Warren Ellis	4:00
14.	"Midnight Run"	Marc Copely / James Bernard Dolan / Adam Stuart Levy	Willie Nelson	2:37
Total length:				41:36

== Reception ==
Neil Spencer of The Guardian wrote "Cave and his band of occasion play a decent brand of fiddle-led balladry and blues, and in Emmylou Harris and Ralph Stanley have borrowed two of country's most revered voices." Curt Holmann of Arts ATL wrote "Lawless ultimately sounds too much like a cover version of someone else's composition." James Christopher Monger of AllMusic wrote "Nick Cave and Warren Ellis' latest soundtrack offering finds the ex-Grinderman/current Bad Seeds provocateurs providing a typically atmospheric score, while handing over vocal duties to some big names." Jordan Zivitz of The Gazette wrote "By turns raucous and sombre, authentic and revisionist, the album hardly needs a film to justify its existence." Maria Schurr of The Quietus wrote "Having Cave and Ellis to ground the soundtrack remains a good thing; the marriage of big names and unexpected interpretations perfectly hitches the Hollywood movie score to something far cooler."

David Rooney of The Hollywood Reporter wrote "As in The Proposition, Cave's contribution extends to an indispensable score, co-written with Warren Ellis [...] Their score here mixes rootsy bluegrass, gospel, country and contemporary songs reinterpreted by Emmylou Harris and Ralph Stanley, among others." Alonso Duralde of TheWrap wrote: "Veteran musician Nick Cave earns the blame for the meandering script, but Cave does a much better job composing the film's score (with Warren Ellis), along with several new (but period-appropriate) songs. They also throw in two different bluegrass-infused covers of the Velvet Underground's "White Light/White Heat" that would sound completely natural coming out of an old radio on the front porch of a country store." Sean P. Means of The Salt Lake Tribune wrote "[Nick] Cave, better known as a rock musician, also collaborated with Warren Ellis on the moody score."

Mike Russell of The Oregonian wrote "the hard-charging soundtrack—featuring Cave, Warren Ellis, Ralph Stanley, Emmylou Harris and Willie Nelson—is an absolute blast." Calling it "a soundtrack strong enough to carry a film", Ken Korman of The Advocate wrote "Cave and longtime musical partner Warren Ellis assembled a band called the Bootleggers to reimagine songs by John Lee Hooker, Link Wray and other greats in the roots-music styles of the 1930s. Two distinct covers of the Velvet Underground's classic "White Light/White Heat" — including one by 85-year-old bluegrass legend Ralph Stanley — transform the Velvets' noisy ode to illicit stimulants into a down-home moonshine anthem." Hal Horowitz of American Songwriter wrote "It's one of the few soundtracks that stands on its own musical merits when removed from the visuals it was recorded to enhance."

Leslie Felperin of Variety wrote "Cherry on top is an inventive score composed by Nick Cave and Warren Ellis and performed by the Bootleggers, a lineup that includes Bad Seed Martyn Casey and Groove Armada’s George Vjestic; together they deliver an insinuating hillbilly-punk sound that’s neither period pastiche nor anachronism, but something deliciously other. A cover of Lou Reed’s “White Light/White Heat,” sung by bluegrass singer Ralph Stanley, reps one of several highlights. Integrated seamlessly with the sound design and editing, the music feels of a piece with the film’s impressive total effect." Liam Lacey of The Globe and Mail called it a "judiciously anachronistic soundtrack".

== Personnel ==
Credits adapted from liner notes:

- Music composer – Nick Cave, Warren Ellis
- Producer – David Sardy, Hal Willner, Jim Schultz, Nick Cave, Warren Ellis
- Bass – Dennis Crouch
- Guitar – James Shelton
- The Bootleggers – David Sardy, George Vjestica, Martyn P. Casey, Nick Cave, Warren Ellis
- Recording – Alan Maggard, Greg Gordon, James Griffith, Joel Cadbury, Lowell Reynolds, Matt Andrews, Pablo Clements
- Recording assistances – Joe Cardamone, Jon Hersey, Patrick Spain
- Mixing – Greg Gordon, Jim Schultz
- Music editors – Jim Schultz, Ron Webb
- Executive soundtrack producer – Jordan Tappis
- Music supervisors – David Sardy, Jordan Tappis
- Music coordinators – Cameron Barton, Julian Chavez, Rachel Fox, Rachel Willis
- Music clearance – Christine Bergren
- Music consultant – Joel C. High
- Design – WLP Ltd
- Liner notes – John Hillcoat, Hal Willner

== Charts ==
Chart (2012)	Peak position
UK Compilation Albums (OCC)	25
UK Soundtrack Albums (OCC)	1
US Top Soundtracks (Billboard)	13

== Accolades ==
Award	Category	Recipients	Result	Ref.
Georgia Film Critics Association	Best Original Song	"Cosmonaut" by Nick Cave and Warren Ellis	Nominated	
Georgia Film Critics Association	Best Original Song	"Fire in the Blood" by Nick Cave and Warren Ellis	Nominated	
Satellite Awards	Best Original Song	"Fire in the Blood" by Nick Cave, Warren Ellis and Emmylou Harris	Nominated	
