= Fire and Brimstone (song) =

1971 single by Link Wray

Single by Link Wray

from the album Link Wray
- A-side: "Fire and Brimstone"
- B-side: "Juke Box Mama"
- Released: June 1971
- Recorded: 1971
- Studio: Wray's Three Track Shack (Accokeek, Maryland)
- Genre: Country
- Length: 4:19
- Label: Polydor
- Songwriter: Link Wray
- Producers: Steve Verroca; Ray Vernon; Bob Feldman

Link Wray singles chronology
"Rumble—69" (1969)	"Fire and Brimstone" (1971)	"Fallin' Rain" (1971)

"Fire and Brimstone" is a song by American singer Link Wray. It was released in June 1971 as the lead single to his self titled, and sixth studio album Link Wray.

== Background ==
During the late 1960s, Link Wray began moving away from the heavy rock and roll sound that had categorized the majority of his early career. By 1971, Wray had started incorporating elements of country blues, folk rock, and gospel music into his music, which still gave it an edge but in a much more stripped down and roots focused way. This transition would result in the self-titled album, Link Wray, which "Fire and Brimstone" is featured on.

=== Lyrical content ===
The song features apocalyptic as well as primarily Biblical imagery, in line with the rest of the albums theme. The song includes the passage told in Revelation 6:12, which depicts the moon turning red. Its title also echoes the Biblical phrase “fire and brimstone,” that is found in Genesis 19:24.

=== Recording ===
The track was recorded at Wray's Three Track Shack, Wray's makeshift recording studio converted from an old chicken coop on his farm in Accokeek, Maryland. The facility utilized a three-track tape recorder, a relatively simple arrangement compared to the multitrack recording utilized by most in the day.

== Covers ==
- The Neville Brothers covered the song in 1989 as the 3rd track to their album Yellow Moon
- Ralph Stanley recorded the song in 2012 and was featured on the Lawless soundtrack to the movie of the same name, as its opening track.
- Sean Rowe released his cover of the song on January 22, 2021
- Charley Crockett covered the song, releasing the song as an Amazon Music exclusive in October 2023 coinciding with Wray's induction into the Rock and Roll Hall of Fame.
- Death Valley Girls recorded and released a cover of the song on April 8, 2025. It is also set to be featured on their 2026 album Welcome to Earth on October 9, 2026.
