= For True =

Studio album by Trombone Shorty
- Released: September 13, 2011
- Studios: Number C Studios (New Orleans, LA); The Music Shed (New Orleans, LA); Dave's Room (North Hollywood, CA); The Bison Roadhouse; KAR Studios (Sherman Oaks, CA); Shorty's Studio (New Orleans, LA)
- Genre: Jazz
- Length: 44:39
- Label: Verve Forecast
- Producer: Ben Ellman

Trombone Shorty chronology
Backatown (2010)	For True (2011)	Say That to Say This (2013)

Singles from For True
- 1. "Do to Me" Released: August 16, 2011

For True is the second solo studio album by American musician Trombone Shorty. It was released on September 13, 2011, on Verve Forecast Records. Recording sessions took place at Number C Studios, the Music Shed and Shorty's Studio in New Orleans, at Dave's Room in North Hollywood, at the Bison Roadhouse, and at KAR Studios in Sherman Oaks. Produced by Ben Ellman, it features guest appearances from 5th Ward Weebie, Cyril Neville, Ivan Neville, Jeff Beck, Kid Rock, Ledisi, Rebirth Brass Band and Warren Haynes.

In the United States, the album peaked at number 72 on the Billboard 200 and atop both the Jazz Albums and the Contemporary Jazz Albums charts.

== Critical reception ==
Professional ratings
Aggregate scores
Source	Rating
Metacritic	67/100
Review scores
Source	Rating
AllMusic	3.5/5 stars
Entertainment Weekly	B
PopMatters	6/10
Rolling Stone	3/5 stars
The Arts Desk	4/5 stars

For True was met with generally favourable reviews from music critics. At Metacritic, which assigns a normalized rating out of 100 to reviews from mainstream publications, the album received an average score of 67 based on eight reviews.

AllMusic's Thom Jurek praised the album, stating: "ultimately, comparing For True to Backatown is pointless: they are of a piece. While you may prefer one over the other, they are, in essence, two parts of a compelling and dynamic musical aesthetic that is firmly in and of the 21st century, as they look back at history and forward to create it". Brad Wete of Entertainment Weekly noted the artist "delivers more flavored Creole soul and a host of guests, including Kid Rock, Jeff Beck, and Lenny Kravitz".

In mixed reviews, Josh Langhoff of PopMatters declared: "the 2011 album this most resembles is funk-rock guitarist Dennis Coffey's self-titled comeback album--a bunch of pretty good soul workouts with lots of guests, some filler, and just enough personality to get by". Will Hermes of Rolling Stone wrote: "none of those songs are as badass as the go-go-flavored "Buckjump", the surf-guitar-spiked title track or the two "Lagniappe" digressions, instrumentals all. When the horns blow, it's all you need to know".

== Track listing ==
No.	Title	Writer(s)	Length
1.	"Buckjump" (featuring Rebirth Brass Band and 5th Ward Weebie)	Troy Andrews; Mike Ballard	4:03
2.	"Encore" (featuring Warren Haynes)	Andrews; Lamont Dozier	4:03
3.	"For True"	Andrews; Ballard	2:53
4.	"Do to Me" (featuring Jeff Beck)	Andrews; Ryan Montbleau	4:37
5.	"Lagniappe (Part 1)"	Andrews; Clarence Slaughter; Dan Oestreicher	1:09
6.	"The Craziest Things"	Andrews; David Ryan Harris	3:19
7.	"Dumaine St."	Andrews	2:37
8.	"Mrs. Orleans" (featuring Kid Rock)	Andrews; Alonzo Stevenson; Robert James Ritchie	3:21
9.	"Nervis" (featuring Cyril Neville and Ivan Neville)	Andrews; Cyril Neville	3:09
10.	"Roses"	Andrews; Montbleau	3:02
11.	"Big 12"	Andrews	3:22
12.	"Unc"	Andrews	2:54
13.	"Then There Was You" (featuring Ledisi)	Andrews; Ledisi Young; Rex Rideout; Drew Ramsey; Shannon Sanders	4:33
14.	"Lagniappe (Part 2)"	Andrews; Slaughter; Oestreicher	1:37
Total length:			44:39

iTunes bonus track
No.	Title	Length
15.	"Yoy"	2:53

== Personnel ==
- Troy "Trombone Shorty" Andrews – vocals, trombone, trumpet, organ, drums, piano, keyboards, synth bass, percussion

Orleans Avenue

- Pete Murano – guitar (tracks: 1–4, 6–11, 13)
- Mike Ballard – bass (tracks: 1–4, 6, 7, 9–11, 13), engineering (track 13)
- Joey Peebles – drums (tracks: 1–4, 6–11, 13)
- Dwayne Williams – percussion (tracks: 1–4, 6–11, 13, 14)
- Dan Oestreicher – baritone saxophone (tracks: 1, 2, 4–11, 13, 14)
- Tim McFatter – tenor saxophone (tracks: 2, 4, 6–11, 13)

Additional musicians

- Jerome Henry "5th Ward Weebie" Cosey – vocals (track 1)
- Ben Ellman – percussion (track 1), harmonica (track 11), producer & engineering (tracks: 1–5, 7–13)
- Charles Smith – percussion (track 1), vocal engineering
- Vincent Broussard – tenor saxophone (track 1)
- Keith Frazier – bass drum (track 1)
- Derrick Tabb – snare (track 1)
- Corey Henry – trombone (track 1)
- Stafford Agee – trombone (track 1)
- Philip "Tuba Phil" Frazier – tuba (track 1)
- Derrick "Kabuky" Shezbie – trumpet (track 1)
- Chaderick Honore – trumpet (track 1)
- Glen Andrews – trumpet (track 1)
- Warren Haynes – guitar solo (track 2)
- Jeff Beck – guitar solo (track 4)
- Clarence Slaughter – tenor saxophone (tracks: 5, 14)
- Stanton Moore – drums (tracks: 5, 14)
- Robert "Kid Rock" Ritchie – vocals & engineering (track 8)
- Robert Mercurio – bass (track 8)
- Cyril Neville – vocals (track 9)
- Ivan Neville – vocals & clavinet (track 9)
- Lenny Kravitz – bass (track 10)
- Ledisi Young – vocals (track 13)

Technical

- George Drakoulias – producer (track 6)
- Mikael "Count" Eldridge – additional producer (tracks: 1, 3, 9, 10, 12), mixing (tracks: 1–5, 7–14), mastering
- Ben Lorio – recording & engineering (tracks: 2, 9)
- David Bianco – recording & mixing (track 6)
- Alan Branch – engineering (track 4)
- Rex Rideout – engineering (track 13)
- Vartan Kurjian – art direction
- Meire Murakami – design
- Kirk Edwards – photography

== Charts ==
=== Weekly charts ===
Chart (2011–12)	Peak position
Dutch Albums (Album Top 100)	23
French Albums (SNEP)	71
German Albums (Offizielle Top 100)	73
Swiss Albums (Schweizer Hitparade)	47
UK Jazz & Blues Albums (Official Charts)	7
US Billboard 200	72
US Top Jazz Albums (Billboard)	1
US Top Contemporary Jazz Albums (Billboard)	1
US Top Current Album Sales (Billboard)	68

=== Year-end charts ===
Chart (2011)	Position
US Top Jazz Albums (Billboard)	18
US Top Contemporary Jazz Albums (Billboard)	8
Chart (2012)	Position
US Top Jazz Albums (Billboard)	14
US Top Contemporary Jazz Albums (Billboard)	2
