= Elizabeth and Victoria Lejonhjärta =

Swedish social media personalities

Elizabeth Lejonhjärta and Victoria Lejonhjärta (Swedish: [ˈlɛ̂jːɔnˌjæʈːa]; born 9 October 1990 in Norrbotten, Sweden) are Swedish twin models, bloggers, writers and social media personalities, best known for their collaborations with Canadian rapper Drake.

== Early and personal lives ==
The twins were born in the Sápmi cultural region, in Northern Sweden, of Swedish, Sami, Gambian, and Senegalese heritage. They describe their childhood home as "semi-Caribbean". Their mother is Swedish, Tornedalian and Sami; their father has heritage from Gambia, Senegal and Sierra Leone. Their younger half-brother Malcolmx's father is from Saint Vincent and the Grenadines. Growing up in the northern Sweden region Norrbotten, they experienced racism and bullying. They were raised in Luleå. They are environmentalists who collect their own water in a Swedish forest for health purposes and reside in the mountains of Överkalix. Drake has a tattoo dedicated to them.

== Career ==
They appear in Drake's album artwork for his album Views and his music videos for Please Forgive Me and Nice for What; they also frequently model for his OVO merchandise. Together, they have also modeled for H&M, Nike, Inc., Vogue, Cheap Monday, Eytys, Calvin Klein, Max Factor, Volvo, Åhléns, Sonos, and Chanel.

== Videography ==
Interviews
Year	Title	Link
2015	Systrarna Lejonhjärta - Platsen	
2015	Systrarna Lejonhjärta - Instagram	
2015	Så hamnade systrarna från Norrbotten i Vogue - Nyhetsmorgon (TV4)	

Music videos
Year	Title	Artist
2016	"Please Forgive Me"	Drake
2018	"Nice for What"	Drake
2022	"Sticky"	Drake
