= Trombone Shorty =

American musician (born 1986)

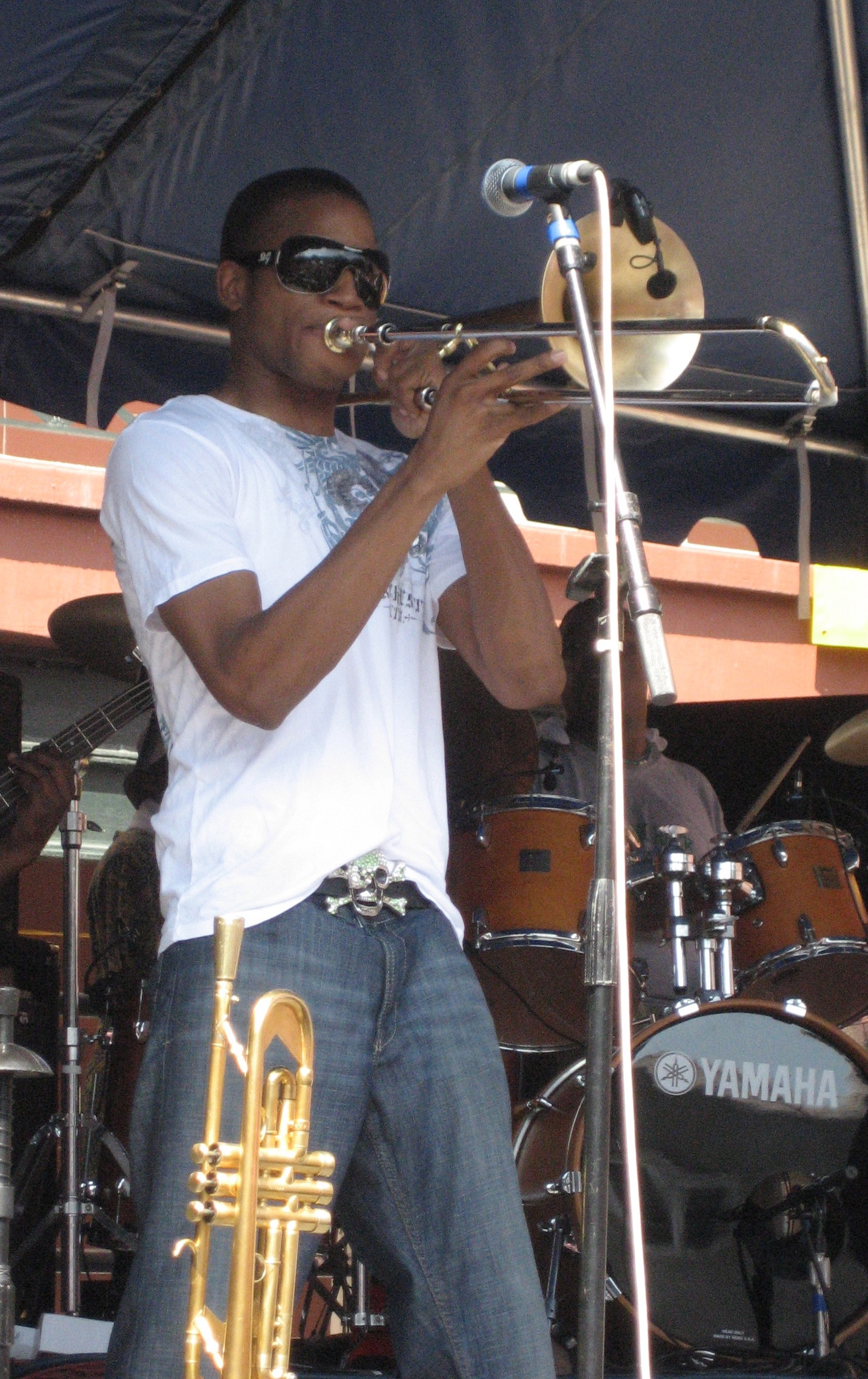
- Trombone Shorty at the Satchmo SummerFest in August 2007
- Born: Troy Andrews; January 2, 1986 (age 40); New Orleans, Louisiana, U.S.
- Occupation: Musician
- Family: James Andrews Jr. (brother); Jessie Hill (grandfather)
- Musical career
- Genres: Jazz; funk
- Instruments: Trombone; trumpet; vocals
- Labels: Verve Forecast; Blue Note
- Website: tromboneshorty.com

Troy Andrews (born January 2, 1986), also known by the stage name Trombone Shorty, is an American musician, most notably a trombone player, from New Orleans, Louisiana. His music fuses rock, pop, jazz, funk, and hip hop.

== Biography ==
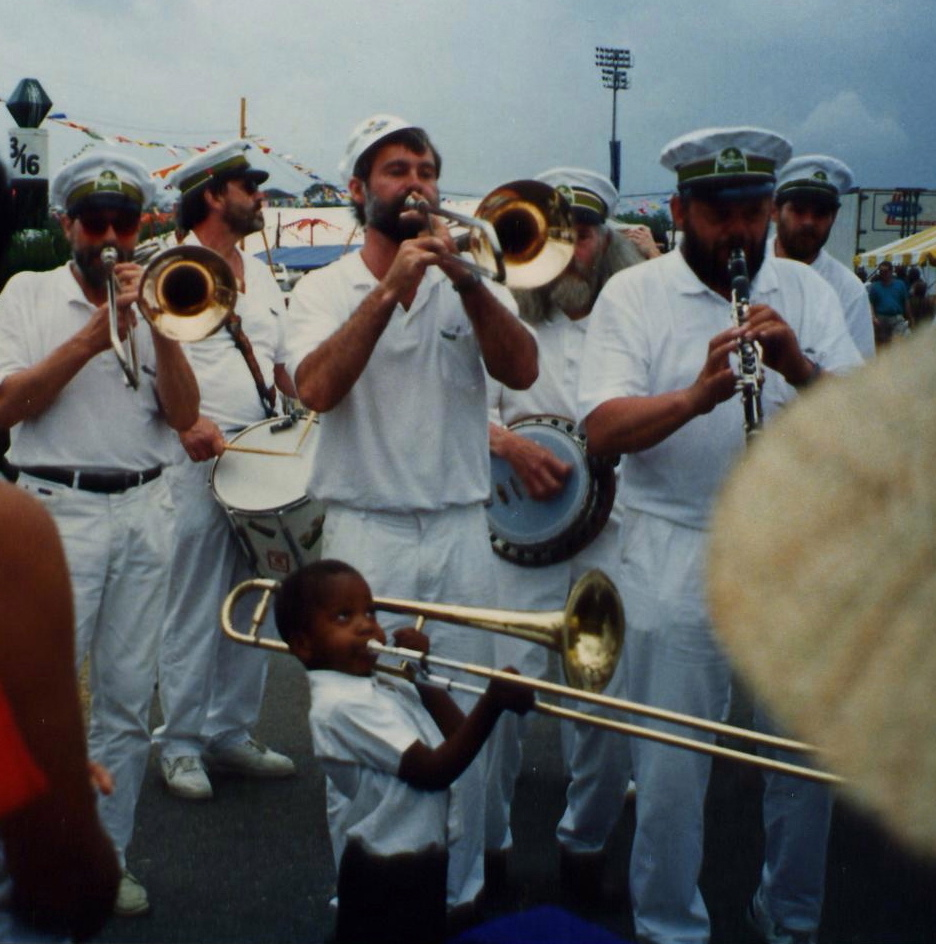
Trombone Shorty at age five, with the Carlsberg Brass Band, New Orleans Jazz & Heritage Festival, 1991

Andrews was one of seven children of James Andrews Jr. and Lois Andrews. He was born in and grew up in the Tremé neighborhood of New Orleans, where he was exposed to jazz, R&B and music-related traditions such as second line parades. Andrews is the younger brother of trumpeter and bandleader James Andrews III and the grandson of singer and songwriter Jessie Hill. His great-uncle Walter "Papoose" Nelson played with Fats Domino. Andrews's mother Lois Nelson Andrews was a regular grand marshal of jazz funerals and second-line parades in New Orleans, where she routinely encouraged young musicians and was known as the "Mother of Music" and "Queen of the Tremé". Andrews's father James Andrews Jr., a member of the Bayou Steppers Social Aid & Pleasure Club, frequently invited musician friends to visit their home. Other musical family members include cousins Glen David Andrews and the late Travis "Trumpet Black" Hill.

Andrews's brother Darnell, also a talented trombone player, was shot and killed in 1995. Following that tragedy, Trombone Shorty was left in the care of his manager and friend, Susan Lovejoy Scott, who acted in loco parentis, managing and mentoring Andrews as a young musician.

At the age of four, Andrews started playing a trombone given to him by his brother James "because the family already had a trumpet player". In 1990, Bo Diddley heard the four-year-old Andrews playing and invited him on stage at the New Orleans Jazz & Heritage Festival. He participated in brass band parades as a child, becoming a band leader by the age of six. He is featured in Disney's film America's Heart and Soul as a child musician.

In his teens, he was a member of the Stooges Brass Band. Andrews's parents opened a nightclub in Tremé called Trombone Shorty's, where he would play on occasion as a child, as well as a jam space for musicians called "The Space". Andrews attended the New Orleans Center for Creative Arts (NOCCA) along with fellow musician Jon Batiste. Since his youth, Andrews has been mentored by Cyril Neville, whom he calls "a second father". Andrews graduated in 2004 from Warren Easton High School.

In 2005, Andrews was a featured member of Lenny Kravitz's horn section in a world tour that shared billing with acts including Aerosmith. Andrews was part of the New Orleans Social Club, a group formed after Hurricane Katrina to record a benefit album. He was featured guest on "Hey Troy, Your Mama's Calling You," a tribute to "Hey Leroy, Your Mama's Calling You" a Latin jazz song by the Jimmy Castor Bunch in 1966.

Andrews is interviewed on screen and appears in performance footage in the 2005 documentary film Make It Funky!, released in 2005, which presents a history of the music of New Orleans and its influence on rhythm and blues, rock music, funk and jazz. In the film, he performed with Kermit Ruffins and Irvin Mayfield on "Skokiaan", and was a guest performer with the Dirty Dozen Brass Band on "My Feet Can't Fail Me Now" as well as a guest performer with Big Sam's Funky Nation on "Bah Duey Duey".

In London, during the summer of 2006, Andrews began working with producer Bob Ezrin and U2 at Abbey Road Studios. This association led to Andrews performing with U2 and Green Day during the re-opening of the Louisiana Superdome for the Monday Night Football pre-game show.

At the end of 2006, Andrews appeared on the NBC television series Studio 60 on the Sunset Strip, where, leading a group of New Orleans musicians, he performed the holiday classic "O Holy Night".

In 2007, he contributed to Goin' Home: A Tribute to Fats Domino on the track "Whole Lotta Lovin" along with Rebirth Brass Band, Pee Wee Ellis, Fred Wesley, Maceo Parker and Lenny Kravitz.

Between 2010 and 2013, Andrews appeared in seven episodes of the HBO series Treme.

In 2010, Andrews released the Ben Ellman produced Backatown (Verve Forecast), which reached number one on the Billboard Contemporary Jazz Chart for nine consecutive weeks. Trombone Shorty & Orleans Avenue toured Australia, North America, Europe, Japan and Brazil, as well as supported shows for Jeff Beck in the U.K. and Dave Matthews Band in the U.S. They performed on television shows including Conan, Late Show with David Letterman, The Tonight Show with Jay Leno, Jimmy Kimmel Live!, Bonnaroo, and Austin City Limits. He also recorded on CDs from Galactic, Eric Clapton, and Lenny Kravitz and on the Academy Award nominated song "Down In New Orleans" with Dr. John.

In September 2011, Andrews released the album For True as a follow-up to his earlier album Backatown. Along with all the members of his band, Orleans Avenue, this record includes appearances by the Rebirth Brass Band, Jeff Beck, Warren Haynes, Stanton Moore, Kid Rock, Ben Ellman and Lenny Kravitz as a returning guest artist. On January 8, 2012, Andrews performed the National Anthem before the start of the NFL playoff game between the New York Giants and Atlanta Falcons. Soul Rebels Brass Band invited Andrews to special guest on their Rounder Records debut record, Unlock Your Mind, released on January 31, 2012. On March 31, 2012, Andrews's single "Do To Me" was featured before both semi-final games of the 2012 NCAA Men's Division I Basketball Tournament on CBS.

On February 21, 2012, Andrews performed at The White House as part of the Black History Month celebration, In Performance at the White House: Red, White & Blues, which premiered on PBS on February 27, 2012. The event featured performances from B.B. King, Jeff Beck, Keb' Mo', Mick Jagger, Susan Tedeschi and Derek Trucks and more. Earlier that day, Andrews also participated in a special education program at The White House with Michelle Obama, Keb' Mo' and Shemekia Copeland.

On January 24, 2014, Andrews performed at MusiCares alongside Steven Tyler and LeAnn Rimes. On January 26, 2014, Andrews performed at the 56th Annual Grammy Awards held at the Staples Center in Los Angeles, CA. He performed with Macklemore & Ryan Lewis, Madonna and Queen Latifah in a version of Macklemore's "Same Love". On February 16, 2014, Andrews and Orleans Avenue led the performance at halftime of the NBA Allstar Game, which was held at the Smoothie King Center in New Orleans, with Andrews also acting as music director for the entire segment joined by Dr. John, Janelle Monáe, Gary Clark Jr. and Earth, Wind & Fire.

In May 2014, Dave Grohl and Foo Fighters traveled to New Orleans to tape their HBO series, Foo Fighters: Sonic Highways. After interviewing Andrews for the show, Grohl invited Shorty to sit in with the Foo Fighters during their unannounced performance that night at Preservation Hall. That led to a friendship that has seen Shorty sit in with the Foo Fighters at their performances at Voodoo Festival in New Orleans, Dave Grohl's Birthday Bash at the Forum in Los Angeles and at the William Morris retreat at the Belly Up in Solana Beach, California.

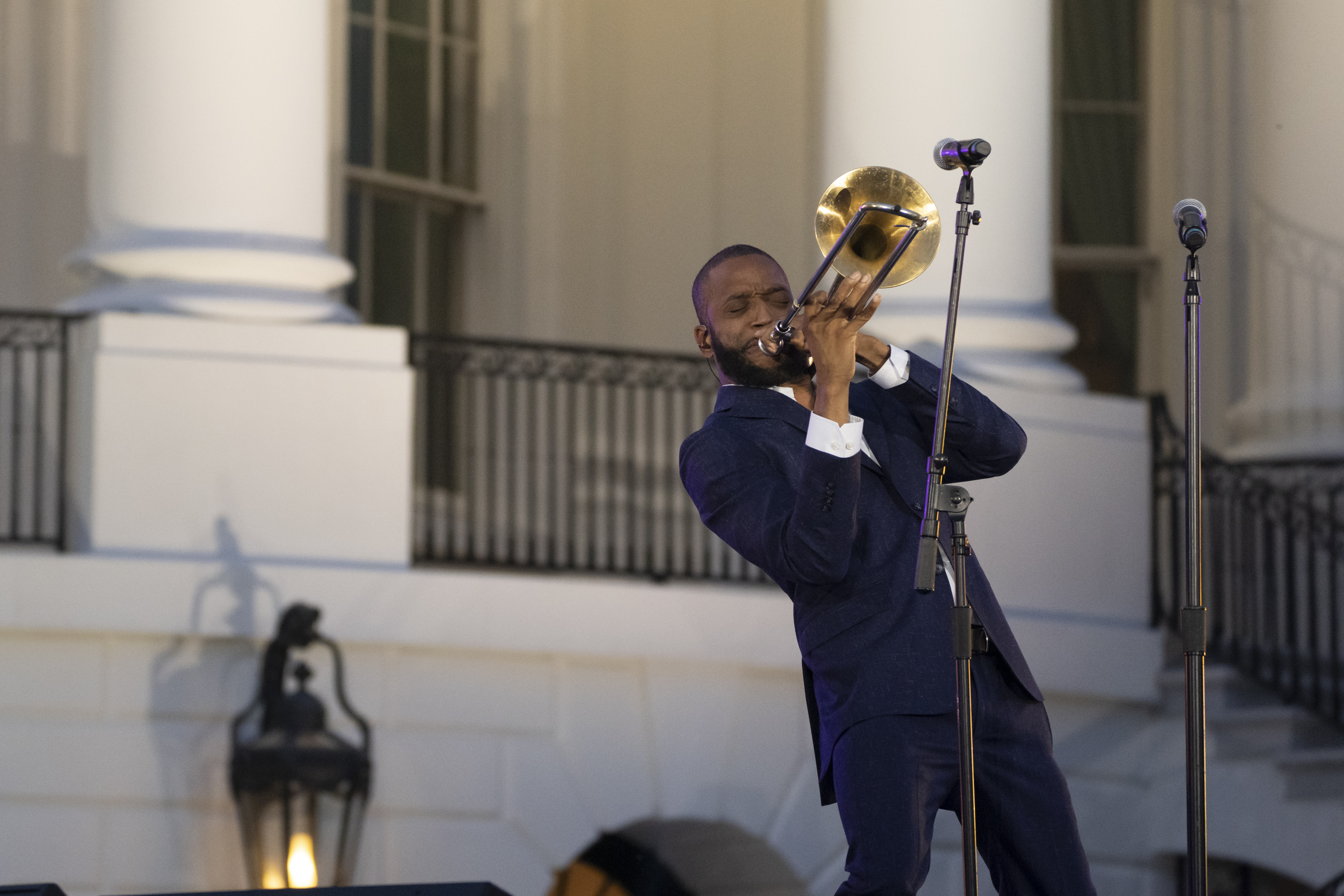
Performing at the White House, 2024

Also in May 2014, Andrews appeared on Mark Ronson's album Uptown Special, notably on the collaboration with Mystikal on the single "Feel Right." At the end of 2014, Andrews recorded the theme song for the remake of the Odd Couple, which premiered on CBS in February 2015. In 2015, Andrews made his feature film debut, recording the voice of the teacher Miss Othmar and the other adults in The Peanuts Movie.

Andrews performed twice for Barack Obama at the White House in 2015. The first time was October 14 where he performed "Fiya on the Bayou" and also performed with Usher and Queen Latifah. The second time was December 3 for the National Christmas Tree lighting where he performed "Jingle Bells" alongside Crosby, Stills and Nash, Aloe Blacc and Reese Witherspoon. In November 2015, Andrews and Orleans Avenue toured Europe with Foo Fighters, although the tour ended early due to the November 2015 Paris attacks.

In April 2016, he performed "Stay All Night" with Little Big Town at the 2016 Academy of Country Music Awards.

In the summer of 2016, Trombone Shorty & Orleans Avenue were a supporting act for Hall & Oates.

In 2017, Trombone Shorty was the opening act for Red Hot Chili Peppers on the North American leg of their 2017 The Getaway World Tour.

In February 2017, Trombone Shorty signed to Blue Note Records. His Blue Note debut, Parking Lot Symphony, was released on April 28, 2017, the first day of the New Orleans Jazz & Heritage Festival.

== Influences ==
Trombone Shorty cites his mentors as his brother James, Cyril Neville, Wynton Marsalis, Kermit Ruffins, Walter "Wolfman" Washington, Allen Toussaint, and Lenny Kravitz.

== Personal life ==
Andrews has a teenage son, Hasaan "Too" Goffner, with Shalanda Goffner Adams.

=== Philanthropy ===
Trombone Shorty established the Horns For Schools Project in collaboration with New Orleans Mayor Mitch Landrieu, which helped schools across New Orleans receive quality instruments donated by Andrews personally.

In December 2010, Andrews curated a two-night Red Hot+New Orleans benefit concert at the Brooklyn Academy of Music to raise money for the New Orleans NO/AIDS Task Force.

He has also established the Trombone Shorty Foundation. In December 2012, it partnered with Tulane University to create an after school academy to mentor high school musicians in the New Orleans area.

== Discography ==
=== As leader ===
- Trombone Shorty's Swingin' Gate (Louisiana Red Hot, 2002)
- The End of the Beginning (Tremé, 2005)
- Orleans & Claiborne (Tremé, 2005)
- Live at New Orleans Jazz Fest (MunckMix, 2004)
- Jazzfest Live 2006 (MunckMix, 2006)
- Live at Jazz Fest 2007 (MunckMix, 2008)
- Live at Jazz Fest 2008 (MunckMix, 2008)
- Backatown (Verve Forecast, 2010)
- For True (Verve Forecast, 2011)
- Say That to Say This (Verve, 2013)
- Parking Lot Symphony (Blue Note, 2017)
- Lifted (Blue Note, 2022)

With others

- It's About Time, 2003 (as part of the Stooges Brass Band)
- 12 & Shorty, Keep Swingin', 2004 (by James & Troy Andrews)
- Trombone Shorty Meets Lionel Ferbos (by Trombone Shorty & Lionel Ferbos)

=== As sideman ===
- 2004: The Same Pocket, Vol. 1: The BlueBrass Project (Meantime Lounge)
- 2006: "Hey Troy, Your Mama's Calling You" and "Where Y'At" by The New Orleans Social Club (Burgundy/Honey Darling) - Sixth Ward All-Star Brass Band Revue featuring Charles Neville of The Neville Brothers.
- 2006: The Saints Are Coming: U2 and Green Day (Mercury). Track 2, "The Saints are Coming (Live from New Orleans)"
- 2007: Marsalis Music Honors Bob French: Bob French (Marsalis Music)
- 2007: Goin' Home: A Tribute to Fats Domino (Vanguard)
- 2007: Oh, My NOLA: Harry Connick, Jr. (Sony/Columbia)
- 2008: Tufflove: Galactic
- 2010: Cineramascope (also featuring Corey Henry): Galactic. Also recorded live along with "Ooh Nah Nay" at the 2010 New Orleans Jazz & Heritage Festival
- 2010: Clapton (also featuring Wynton Marsalis, Allen Toussaint & others)
- 2011: Black and White America: Lenny Kravitz
- 2011: Rock 'n' Roll Party (Honoring Les Paul): Jeff Beck (Atlantic). Also Philadelphia Folk Festival
- 2012: "It Ain't My Fault" (featuring Allen Toussaint and Yasiin Bey a.k.a. Mos Def) on the record St. Peter & 57th Street by Preservation Hall Jazz Band
- 2012: "Merry Christmas Baby" and "Red-Suited Superman" on Merry Christmas, Baby by Rod Stewart
- 2012: "Overnight" on the record Uncaged by Zac Brown Band (Atlantic/Southern Ground Artists)
- 2012: "People Pleaser" (featuring Maceo Parker) on Superconductor by Andy Allo
- 2012: "Merry Christmas Baby" on Cee Lo's Magic Moment with Cee Lo Green
- 2013: "Need a Woman by Friday" by King
- 2013: "Take the Party" by Robert Randolph and the Family Band on Lickety Split
- 2014: "Smokin' in the Boys' Room" by LeAnn Rimes on Nashville Outlaws: A Tribute to Motley Crue
- 2014: Classics by She & Him
- 2014: "Amazing Game" on Wild Heart by Mindi Abair
- 2015: "Hold Up, Wait a Minute" by Zhu x Bone Thugs-n-Harmony x Trombone Shorty
- 2015: "Feel Right" on Uptown Special by Mark Ronson
- 2016: "Mardi Gras" by Dierks Bentley on Black
- 2018: "What Was It You Wanted" by Bettye LaVette on Things Have Changed
- 2019: "Ciel Noir" and "Dernier soupir" by Nekfeu on Les Étoiles vagabondes
- 2021: "Coming Undone" on the EP Change the World by Ringo Starr

== Filmography and TV appearances ==
- Super Bowl LIX football game opening ceremony (2025, NBC)
- The Late Show with Stephen Colbert - Performer (2017 & 2022, CBS)
- The George Lucas Talk Show (2020)
- Les Étoiles vagabondes (2019, Netflix)
- NCIS New Orleans Bar Act (2018)
- The Simpsons - Trombonist (voice) (2018, Fox)
- Jool's Annual Hootenanny - Performer (2017, BBC)
- National Christmas Tree Lighting - Performer (2015, PBS)
- The Peanuts Movie, Miss Othmar/Mrs. Little Red-Haired Girl (voice) (2015)
- SportsCenter - "Hurricane Season" for the Midnight Edition with Scott Van Pelt (2015, ESPN)
- Odd Couple - Music for the theme song (2015)
- Foo Fighters: Sonic Highways, Episode 6 (2014, HBO)
- NBA All-Star Game Half Time Show - Performer and house band with Earth, Wind & Fire, Janelle Monáe, Gary Clark Jr. and Dr. John (2014, TBS)
- The Grammy Awards - Performer with Macklemore & Ryan Lewis, Madonna and Queen Latifah (2014)
- Conan (2014) - Musical Guest
- Treme - as himself (2010–2013, HBO)
- Sunshine By The Stars: Celebrating Louisiana Music (2012, PBS)
- The Hour - Performer (2011)
- Looking Back on Love: Making Black and White America (2011)
- The Late Late Show with Craig Ferguson - Musical Guest – Episode 8.21 (2011)
- Later... with Jools Holland - Performer – Episode 39.1 (2011)
- Conan (2011)
- Re:Generation (2011)
- Jeff Beck Honors Les Paul (2010)
- The Tonight Show with Jay Leno - Guest Musician – Episode 19.9 (2010)
- Jimmy Kimmel Live! - Musical Guest - Episode 9.12 (2010)
- Live from the Artists Den (2010)
- Late Show with David Letterman - Musical Guest (2010)
- Tavis Smiley – Episode dated May 18 (2010)
- After Hours with Daniel Boulud (2008)
- Trombone Shorty Documentary / short film (2008 FXF productions)
- Studio 60 on the Sunset Strip episode "The Christmas Show" (2006, Warner Bros. Entertainment)
- Make It Funky! (documentary with various artists of New Orleans) (2005, Sony Pictures Entertainment)
- Soundmix: Five Young Musicians (2004)
- America's Heart and Soul Documentary (2004, Walt Disney Pictures)

== Awards and honors ==
In early 2007, New Orleans music magazine Offbeat named Andrews Performer of the Year. He also garnered honors as Best Contemporary Jazz Performer.

In 2010, Trombone Shorty's album Backatown was nominated for the Grammy Award for Best Contemporary Jazz Album.

On May 19, 2012, Andrews received the President's Medal from Tulane University President Scott Cowen at the university's Unified Commencement Ceremony at the Mercedes-Benz Superdome in New Orleans, in recognition of his community service work with the Horns for Schools Project.

In 2016, Andrews received the 21st Annual Heinz Awards in the Arts and Humanities category, valued at $250,000, "for his achievements as a musician and for his community work to preserve and pass on to younger generations the rich musical heritage of his native New Orleans".

Andrews's autobiography for young readers (titled Trombone Shorty), illustrated by Bryan Collier, was named as a 2016 Caldecott Honor Book. The award is given to the illustrator by the Association for Library Service to Children (ALSC), a division of the American Library Association (ALA). The book also garnered for Collier the Coretta Scott King Award from the ALA's Ethnic & Multicultural Information Exchange Round Table.

In May 2018, Trombone Shorty won a Blues Music Award in the Blues Instrumentalist: Horn category.

In 2022, Andrews won his first Grammy Award for his work on Jon Batiste's We Are as a featured artist.

== Books ==
- Andrews, Troy (2015). Trombone Shorty. illustrated by Bryan Collier. New York, NY: Abrams Books for Young Readers. ISBN 978-1-4197-1465-8. OCLC 880349715.
- Andrews, Troy; Taylor, Bill (2018). The 5 O'Clock Band. illustrated by Bryan Collier. New York, NY: Abrams Books for Young Readers. ISBN 9781419728365. OCLC 1000582995.
