= Mordicai Jones =

Studio album by Link Wray
- Released: 1972
- Recorded: 1971
- Studio: Link Wray's Shack 3 Track, Accokeek, Maryland, by Ray Vernon & Chuck Irwin
- Length: 39:28
- Label: Polydor
- Producer: Steve Verroca

Link Wray chronology
Link Wray (1971)	Mordicai Jones (1972)	Be What You Want To (1973)

Professional ratings
Review scores
Source	Rating
AllMusic	3.5/5 stars

Mordicai Jones is a 1972 album by American guitarist Link Wray. The album was credited to mysterious singer Mordicai Jones, who was Link's piano player Bobby Howard. It was recorded under the supervision of producer Steve Verocca at Wray's Shack Three Track studio in Accokeek, Maryland, during the Link Wray / Beans and Fatback sessions.

== History ==
It is credited to lead vocalist Mordicai Jones, an alias for Bobby Howard. The music is an Americana blend of blues, country, soul, and folk rock. The same casual and laid-back sound was used during the Link Wray / Beans and Fatback sessions. Some tracks from the album later surfaced on the compilation Guitar Preacher: The Polydor Years, and the album was included in its entirety, together with the other "shack" recordings of 1971 (Link Wray and Beans and Fatback), on Wray's Three Track Shack.

== Track listing ==
All songs written by Link Wray and Steve Verroca, except where noted.

1. "Walkin' in the Arizona Sun" - 2:53
2. "Scorpio Woman" - 3:47
3. "The Coca Cola Sign Blinds My Eye" (Link Wray, Steve Verroca, Mordicai Jones) - 6:24
4. "All I Want To Say" - 3:12
5. "All Because of a Woman" - 3:20
6. "On the Run" (Wray, Verroca, Jones) - 5:45
7. "Son of a Simple Man" - 4:22
8. "Precious Jewel" (Roy Acuff) - 2:14
9. "Days Before Custer" - 4:01
10. "Gandy Dancer" - 3:30

== Personnel ==
- Link Wray - electric guitar, dobro, steel guitar, bass guitar
- Doug Wray - rhythm guitar, proccnail can percussion, background vocals
- Mordicai Jones (a.k.a. Bobby Howard) - lead vocals, piano, mandolin, harp
- Bill Hodges - organ, piano, scratcher percussion, background vocals
- Steve Verroca - drums, background vocals
- John Grummere - electric rhythm guitar, background vocals
- Norman Sue - bass guitar, background vocals
- Ned Levitt - foot stomp, hand claps, background vocals

== Production ==
- Producer: Steve Verroca
- Recording Engineer: Ray Vernon (a.k.a. Vernon Wray), Chuck Irwin
- Mixing: Chuck Irwin
- Photography: unknown
- Art Design: unknown
