= Shadowman (Link Wray album) =

Studio album by Link Wray
- Released: 1997
- Recorded: The Priory, Little Wymondley
- Genre: Rock
- Length: 54:02
- Label: Hip-O, Ace
- Producer: Roger Armstrong, Ted Carroll

Link Wray chronology
Indian Child (1993)	Shadowman (1997)	Barbed Wire (2000)

Shadowman is a 1997 studio album by Link Wray on Ace Records. The track "Rumble on the Docks" was used by Anheuser-Busch for a 2000 television advertising campaign.

== Tracklist ==
1. Rumble On The Docks
2. Heartbreak Hotel
3. Geronimo
4. Young Love
5. Moped Baby
6. Run Through The Jungle
7. I Can't Help It (If I'm Still In Love With You)
8. Night Prowler
9. It Was So Easy
10. Timewarp/Brain Damage
11. Listen To The Drums
12. Shadowman
