= Beans and Fatback =

Studio album by Link Wray
- Released: 1973
- Recorded: 1971
- Studio: by Ray Vernon at Wray's Shack Three Track, Accokeek, Maryland, mixed by Simon Heyworth at The Manor Studio
- Length: 47:40
- Label: Virgin V2006
- Producer: Steve Verroca

Link Wray chronology
Be What You Want To (1972)	Beans and Fatback (1973)	Rockin' & Handclappin' (1973)

Beans and Fatback is a 1973 album by American guitarist Link Wray. It was recorded in 1971 by Link's brother Vernon "Ray Vernon" Wray at Wray's Shack Three Track studio, an old chicken shack on Wray's farm in Accokeek, Maryland during the Link Wray/Mordicai Jones sessions. It was mixed by Simon Heyworth at The Manor Studio, Oxfordshire, England. The music is similar to other of Wray's period recordings with distinctive "shack" sound and the same Americana blend of blues, country, gospel, and folk rock, but it is a slightly looser and harder-rocking set than Link Wray.

The two CD compilation Wray's Three Track Shack (Acadia/Evangeline Recorded Works Ltd./Universal Music, 2005) includes Beans And Fatback along with other "shack" recordings of 1971 (Link Wray and Mordicai Jones), but the track "Take My Hand (Precious Lord)" was replaced without credit by "Backwoods Preacher Man" (a cover song of Tony Joe White) from The Link Wray Rumble album (Polydor, 1974).

Steve Verroca had, allegedly, stolen the demo tapes of Beans and Fatback and sold them to Virgin Records. Link Wray recorded the Stuck in Gear album for Virgin (catalogue number V2050) so they withdrew Beans and Fatback.

== Reception ==
Professional ratings
Review scores
Source	Rating
Allmusic	4/5 stars

Allmusic gave a positive retrospective review of the album. They contended that Beans and Fatback lacks the deep emotional resonance of Link Wray, but "goes a lot farther toward fusing the rowdy howl of Wray's early instrumental hits with the back-to-the-land flavor of his more personal 1971 set."

== Track listing ==
All songs written by Link Wray and Steve Verroca, except where noted.

1. "Beans and Fatback" - 1:36
2. "I'm So Glad, I'm So Proud" - 6:21
3. "Shawnee Tribe" - 3:27
4. "Hobo Man" - 3:53
5. "Georgia Pines" (Traditional) - 3:57
6. "Alabama Electric Circus" - 3:59
7. "Water Boy" - 6:12
8. "From Tulsa to North Carolina" - 4:30
9. "Right or Wrong (You Lose)" - 2:58
10. "In the Pines" (Traditional; arranged by Link Wray and Steve Verroca) - 7:09
11. "Take My Hand (Precious Lord)" (Traditional) - 3:38

== Personnel ==
- Link Wray - electric guitar, acoustic guitar, dobro, 12-string guitar, bass guitar, steel guitar, lead vocals
- Doug Wray - rhythm guitar, background vocals
- Bill "Juke Box" Hodges - piano, organ, background vocals
- Mordicai Jones (a.k.a. Bobby Howard) - piano, mandolin
- Steve Verroca - drums, percussion, background vocals

== Production ==
- Producer: Steve Verroca
- Recording engineer: Ray Vernon
- Mixing engineer: Simon Heyworth
- Photography: unknown
- Art design: unknown
