= Brimstone =

Brimstone primarily refers to:

- An archaic name for sulfur
- Fire and brimstone, an expression of signs of God's wrath in the Bible, or a style of Christian preaching that uses vivid descriptions of judgment and eternal damnation to encourage repentance

Brimstone may also refer to:

== Arts and media ==
=== Fictional characters and items ===
- Brimstone (DC Comics), several fictional characters
- A character in Laini Taylor's fantasy book series Daughter of Smoke and Bone
- Brimstone, a character in the video game Valorant

=== Works ===
- Brimstone (1949 film), a 1949 American Western film
- Brimstone and Treacle 1982 film from a BBC play by Dennis Potter
- Brimstone (2016 film), a 2016 western thriller film, written and directed by Martin Koolhoven
- Brimstone (Parker novel), a 2009 Western novel by Robert B. Parker
- Brimstone (Preston and Child novel), a 2004 novel by Douglas Preston and Lincoln Child
- Brimstone (TV series), a supernatural TV series that originally aired on Fox Television in 1998
- "Brimstone", a song by Whitechapel from the album The Valley (2019)

== Species ==
- Brimstone canary, in the finch family
- Brimstone moth, a moth of the family Geometridae
- Gonepteryx, a genus of butterflies commonly known as the brimstones
  - Gonepteryx rhamni, a species of Gonepteryx commonly known as the brimstone or common brimstone

== Other uses ==
- Brimstone (missile), an air-to-ground weapon system
- Brimstone, Ontario, a community in Caledon, Ontario, Canada
- Brimstone Creek, a river in New York, U.S.

== See also ==
- Brimstone Peak (disambiguation)
