= Trombone Shorty (book) =

2015 picture book by Troy Andrews

- Author: Troy Andrews
- Illustrator: Bryan Collier
- Language: English
- Genre: Picture book
- Publisher: Abrams Books
- Publication date: April 14, 2015
- Publication place: United States
- Pages: 40
- Awards: Caldecott Honor
- ISBN: 978-1-41-971465-8

Trombone Shorty is an autobiographical picture book written by Troy Andrews, with illustrations by Bryan Collier. It tells the story of how Andrews grew up in New Orleans and started playing the trombone at an early age.

== Reception ==
Kirkus Reviews, which gave the book a starred review, praised Collier's illustrations, noting his use of mixed-media collage, saying he "portrays the story of this living legend with energy and style, making visible the swirling sounds of jazz." They also praised the author's story, calling it inspiring. Publishers Weekly also commented about the art and how it is used to depict the sounds of the instruments, the "fragrance of gumbo" and Andrews' dreams of becoming a trombone player. The book was similarly praised by reviewers for both The Horn Book Magazine and The Booklist.

Trombone Shorty was one of the four Caldecott Honor books of 2016.
