= Be What You Want To =

Studio album by Link Wray
- Released: March 1973
- Recorded: 1972
- Studio: Wally Heider Studios, San Francisco
- Genre: Country rock; rock and roll
- Length: 42:55
- Label: Polydor
- Producer: Thomas Jefferson Kaye

Link Wray chronology
Mordicai Jones (1971)	Be What You Want To (1973)	Beans and Fatback (1973)

Professional ratings
Review scores
Source	Rating
Allmusic	3/5 stars

Be What You Want To is the 1973 album by American guitarist Link Wray. The album was recorded in 1972 with many guest musicians, including Jerry Garcia, Commander Cody, and David Bromberg.

== Track listing ==
All tracks by Link Wray except where noted.

1. "Be What You Want To" - 5:57
2. "All Cried Out" (Mann Curtis, Michel Deborah) - 3:48
3. "Lawdy Miss Clawdy" (Lloyd Price) - 2:41
4. "Tucson, Arizona" - 4:18
5. "Riverbend" - 2:40
6. "You Walked By" - 3:17
7. "Walk Easy, Walk Slow" - 5:20
8. "All the Love in My Life" - 4:05
9. "You Really Got a Hold on Me" - 4:04
10. "Shine the Light" - 4:43
11. "Morning" - 2:02

== Personnel ==
- Link Wray - electric guitar, lead vocals
- Jerry Garcia - guitar, pedal steel
- Commander Cody - piano, keyboards
- Lance Dickerson - drums
- Andy Stein - fiddle
- Bobby Black - steel guitar
- David Bromberg - acoustic guitar, electric guitar
- Chris Michie - acoustic guitar, electric guitar, backing vocals
- Tom Salisbury - organ, piano, Clavinet, backing vocals, horn arrangements, string arrangements
- Peter Kaukonen - electric guitar
- John McFee - electric guitar
- Paul Barlow - bass
- Teresa Adams - cello
- Jules Broussard - alto saxophone, tenor saxophone
- Jack Schroer - Baritone saxophone
- Greg Douglass - slide guitar
- Kip Maercklein - bass
- Rick Shlosser - drums
- Tom Harrell - trumpet
- Jules Rowell - valve trombone
- Nathan Rubin - violin
- Bruce Steinberg - harmonica
- David Coffin, Henry Coleman, Keith Crossan, Frank Demme, Diane Earl, Robert Frost, Zeller Hurd, Carl Johnson, Thomas Jefferson Kaye, Greg Kenney, Barbara Mauritz, Dorothy Morrison, Ralph Payne - backing vocals

== Production ==
- Producer: Thomas Jefferson Kaye
- Recording Engineer: Mallory Earl, Don Ososke
- Mixing: Mallory Earl
- Photography: Bruce Steinberg
- Art Direction: Bruce Steinberg
- Cover Design: Bruce Steinberg
