= Nice for What =

2018 single by Drake

Single by Drake

from the album Scorpion
- Released: April 6, 2018
- Recorded: 2018
- Genre: Bounce
- Length: 3:30
- Label: Young Money; Cash Money; Republic
- Songwriters: Aubrey Graham; Shane Lindstrom; Lauryn Hill; Robert Diggs; Gary Grice; Russell Jones; Clifford Smith; Corey Woods; Dennis Coles; Jason Hunter; Lamont Hawkins; Elgin Turner; Alan Bergman; Marilyn Bergman; Marvin Hamlisch; Orville Hall; Phillip Price
- Producers: 40; Murda Beatz; Corey Litwin; Blaqnmild (co.)

Drake singles chronology
"Walk It Talk It" (2018)	"Nice for What" (2018)	"Yes Indeed" (2018)

Music video
- "Nice for What" on YouTube

"Nice for What" is a song recorded by Canadian rapper Drake from his fifth studio album Scorpion (2018). It was released by Young Money Entertainment and Cash Money Records as the second single from the album on April 6, 2018, along with its music video. The song was produced by Murda Beatz, Noah "40" Shebib and Corey Litwin with co-production handled by Blaqnmild. It features additional vocals by Big Freedia and 5th Ward Weebie. It contains a sample from "Ex-Factor", written and performed by Lauryn Hill, which itself samples "Can It Be All So Simple", written and performed by Wu-Tang Clan. The latter song also samples "The Way We Were". Therefore, Hill, the eight members of Wu-Tang Clan, and Marvin Hamlisch, Alan Bergman and Marilyn Bergman are credited among the composers.

"Nice for What" debuted at number one on the US Billboard Hot 100, replacing Drake's own "God's Plan" and becoming his fifth US number one. It also topped the UK Singles Chart and ARIA Singles Chart, becoming his second number-one song of 2018 in the two countries after "God's Plan". The song was certified Diamond by the Recording Industry Association of America (RIAA).

At the 61st Annual Grammy Awards, "Nice for What" was nominated for Best Rap Performance. The song was also awarded two ASCAP Awards, including Top Rap Song. Rolling Stone ranked it 54th on their list of the '100 Best Songs of the 2010s'. In 2021, The Guardian ranked it number-one on their list of 'Drake's 30 Greatest songs'. It was later ranked as the number one Drake Hot 100 hit by Billboard staff.

== Background ==
On March 14, 2018, Lauryn Hill's son Joshua Omaru Marley posted a snippet of the song on Snapchat. Drake later confirmed an upcoming Murda Beatz-produced single during an Instagram Live session. On April 5, Drake made a surprise appearance during a Majid Jordan concert in Toronto. "The reason I'm here tonight is because I'm back in the city finishing my album," he told the audience. "I've got a new single dropping tomorrow night, too, just in case you got some free time."

== Composition ==
"Nice for What" is an upbeat bounce song which contains elements of early 2000s R&B, with a length of three minutes thirty seconds. It samples Lauryn Hill's song "Ex-Factor" (1998), "Drag Rap" by the Showboys (1986), "Get Your Roll On" by Big Tymers (2000), and also features clips from performances by Big Freedia. Lyrically, the hook of Drake's song samples Lauryn Hill singing about "cutting loose in the midst of a relationship".

== Music video ==
Directed by Karena Evans, the accompanying music video shows women carrying out various activities, including swimming, dancing, modeling, playing with children, horse-riding, and holding a business meeting. It features guest appearances from, in order of appearance, Olivia Wilde, Misty Copeland, Issa Rae, Rashida Jones, Jourdan Dunn, Tracee Ellis Ross, Tiffany Haddish, Yara Shahidi, Zoe Saldaña, Elizabeth and Victoria Lejonhjärta, Letitia Wright, Bria Vinaite, Emma Roberts, Syd, Michelle Rodriguez and Drake himself. Evans called it an honour to work on the video, writing on Instagram that it was "a privilege and a blessing to have told this story with every single one of you revolutionary women, both in front and behind the camera".

== Critical reception ==
"Nice for What" received positive reviews from music critics, with many praising its promotion of female empowerment. Hugh McIntyre of Forbes regarded the "perfectly-pitched" song as "another perfect delivery from the biggest artist in hip-hop", writing that the "vocal sample helps the track stand out from much of the rest of his discography". Kevin Lozano of Pitchfork awarded the song "Best New Track", praising Drake for "smoothly handling the impeccable production from Murda Beatz", and lauding the song as "a fantastic piece of hip-hop machinery" and "one of Drake's most complete releases in some time".

Chris DeVille of Stereogum deemed the song "a big, brash, almost obnoxiously loud New Orleans bounce-inspired production", describing it as "extremely poppy and sounds like a bid for continued commercial dominance".

Billboard named "Nice for What" the fifth-best song of 2018. Rolling Stone also named "Nice for What" the fifth-best song of 2018, and ranked it 54th on their list of the '100 Best Songs of the 2010s'.

In 2021, The Guardian ranked it number-one on their list of 'Drake's 30 Greatest songs'. Billboard staff placed it at number one on their 2024 list ranking all 321 Drake songs that reached the Hot 100 at the time.

== Commercial performance ==
In the United States, Drake became the first artist to have a new number-one debut replace his former number-one debut ("God's Plan") at the top of the Hot 100. It debuted with 88,000 downloads sold and 60.4 million streams. "Nice for What" became the 30th song in Billboard history to enter at number one. It also became Drake's fifth US number-one song overall and third as a lead artist. The song also became the first song to debut on the Mainstream R&B/Hip-Hop chart in the top 10. "Nice for What" topped the Hot 100 for four consecutive weeks before it was replaced on May 14, 2018, by Childish Gambino's "This Is America". It then returned for a fifth non-consecutive week at the number one spot on the issue date June 2, 2018. On the issue dated July 14, 2018, "Nice for What" became the first song to reach number one in four nonconsecutive runs. It topped the Hot 100 for eight nonconsecutive weeks. On July 21, 2018, it was replaced at the top by another Drake song, “In My Feelings” and slipped to the number four spot. It ultimately remained in the top ten for 17 weeks.

== Awards and nominations ==
Year	Organization	Award	Result
2018	Teen Choice Awards	Choice Summer Song	Nominated
2018	iHeartRadio MMVAs	Best Director	Nominated
2018	iHeartRadio MMVAs	Song of the Summer	Nominated
2018	BET Hip Hop Awards	Single of the Year	Nominated
2019	Grammy Awards	Best Rap Performance	Nominated
2019	iHeartRadio Music Awards	Hip-Hop Song of the Year	Nominated
2019	ASCAP Rhythm & Soul Awards	Award Winning Rap Songs	Won
2019	ASCAP Rhythm & Soul Awards	Top Rap Song	Won

== Personnel ==
Credits adapted from Tidal and Qobuz.

- Aubrey Graham — vocals, lyrics, composition
- Paul "Nineteen85" Jeffries – co-production, composition, lyrics, additional vocals
- Noah "40" Shebib – production, mixing, lyrics, composition
- Noel Cadastre — recording engineer
- Maneesh Bidaye — lyrics, additional vocals, composition
- Corey Litwin – production
- No I.D. – lyrics
- Harley Arsenault – assistant production, lyrics, mixing assistance, composition
- Greg Moffet – mixing assistance
- Ronald Moonoo – mixing assistance
- Chris Quock – recording engineering assistance
- Noel "Gadget" Campbell – mixing
- Mike Gaydusek – record engineering
- Big Freedia – additional vocals
- 5thward Weebie – additional vocals
- Glenishe "Bobby Jean" Rowe – additional vocals

== Charts ==
=== Weekly charts ===
Chart (2018)	Peak position
Argentina (Argentina Hot 100)	25
Australia (ARIA)	1
Austria (Ö3 Austria Top 40)	6
Belgium (Ultratop 50 Flanders)	20
Belgium (Ultratip Bubbling Under Wallonia)	6
Canada Hot 100 (Billboard)	1
Canada CHR/Top 40 (Billboard)	3
Czech Republic Singles Digital (ČNS IFPI)	23
Denmark (Tracklisten)	3
Euro Digital Song Sales (Billboard)	4
Finland (Suomen virallinen lista)	13
France (SNEP)	26
Germany (GfK)	9
Greece (IFPI)	3
Hungary (Single Top 40)	29
Hungary (Stream Top 40)	11
Ireland (IRMA)	2
Italy (FIMI)	53
Netherlands (Single Top 100)	6
New Zealand (Recorded Music NZ)	1
Norway (VG-lista)	5
Portugal (AFP)	7
Scottish Singles Sales (Official Charts)	10
Slovakia Singles Digital (ČNS IFPI)	13
Spain (Promusicae)	62
Sweden (Sverigetopplistan)	4
Switzerland (Schweizer Hitparade)	7
UK Singles (Official Charts)	1
UK Hip Hop/R&B (Official Charts)	1
US Billboard Hot 100	1
US Dance Club Songs (Billboard)	30
US Hot R&B/Hip-Hop Songs (Billboard)	1
US Pop Airplay (Billboard)	11
US Rhythmic Airplay (Billboard)	1

=== Year-end charts ===
Chart (2018)	Position
Australia (ARIA)	22
Belgium (Ultratop Flanders)	100
Canada (Canadian Hot 100)	9
Denmark (Tracklisten)	30
France (SNEP)	148
Ireland (IRMA)	11
Netherlands (Single Top 100)	69
New Zealand (Recorded Music NZ)	11
Portugal (AFP)	41
Sweden (Sverigetopplistan)	57
UK Singles (Official Charts Company)	7
US Billboard Hot 100	11
US Hot R&B/Hip-Hop Songs (Billboard)	5
US Mainstream Top 40 (Billboard)	44
US Rhythmic (Billboard)	4

=== Decade-end charts ===
Chart (2010–2019)	Position
US Billboard Hot 100	87
US Hot R&B/Hip-Hop Songs (Billboard)	48

== Certifications ==
Region	Certification	Certified units/sales
Australia (ARIA)	8× Platinum	560,000^{‡}
Brazil (Pro-Música Brasil)	3× Platinum	120,000^{‡}
Canada (Music Canada)	4× Platinum	320,000^{‡}
Denmark (IFPI Danmark)	2× Platinum	180,000^{‡}
France (SNEP)	Platinum	200,000^{‡}
Germany (BVMI)	Gold	200,000^{‡}
Italy (FIMI)	Gold	25,000^{‡}
New Zealand (RMNZ)	5× Platinum	150,000^{‡}
Portugal (AFP)	Platinum	10,000^{‡}
United Kingdom (BPI)	4× Platinum	2,400,000^{‡}
United States (RIAA)	Diamond	10,000,000^{‡}
Streaming
Sweden (GLF)	Platinum	8,000,000^{†}
^{‡} Sales+streaming figures based on certification alone.^{†} Streaming-only figures based on certification alone.

== Release history ==
Region	Date	Format	Label	Ref.
Various	April 6, 2018	Digital download	Young Money; Cash Money	
United States	April 10, 2018	Rhythmic and Urban contemporary radio	Young Money; Cash Money; Republic	
