= Backatown =

2010 studio album by Trombone Shorty

Studio album by Trombone Shorty
- Released: 20 April 2010
- Studio: The Gumbo Room, New Orleans
- Genre: Jazz
- Length: 43:12
- Label: Verve Forecast
- Producer: Ben Ellman

Trombone Shorty chronology
Orleans & Claiborne (2005)	Backatown (2010)	For True (2011)

Backatown is an album released by jazz musician Troy 'Trombone Shorty' Andrews. The album was released in 2010 by Verve Forecast Records and was produced by Galactic's Ben Ellman. It reached number 3 on the Billboard Jazz Albums Chart and was nominated for the 2011 Grammy Award for Best Contemporary Jazz Album.

== Overview ==
What we tried to do with the record is capture what we do live and then just tighten it up a little bit, make it translate on record. Live, we may come across some stuff and jam on it, but the record brings it in and focuses on what we needed to do. We worked hard and we didn't rush it. I think we alright with this one.

— Troy 'Trombone Shorty' Andrews

Backatown represents Andrews's national and major label debut. The tracks "In the 6th", "Hurricane Season" and "Backatown" pay homage to the culture and neighborhoods of New Orleans, Andrews hometown. He refers to his diverse musical style as 'supafunkrock'.

The album was nominated for the 2011 Grammy Award for Best Contemporary Jazz Album but lost to the Stanley Clarke album The Stanley Clarke Band.

== The band ==
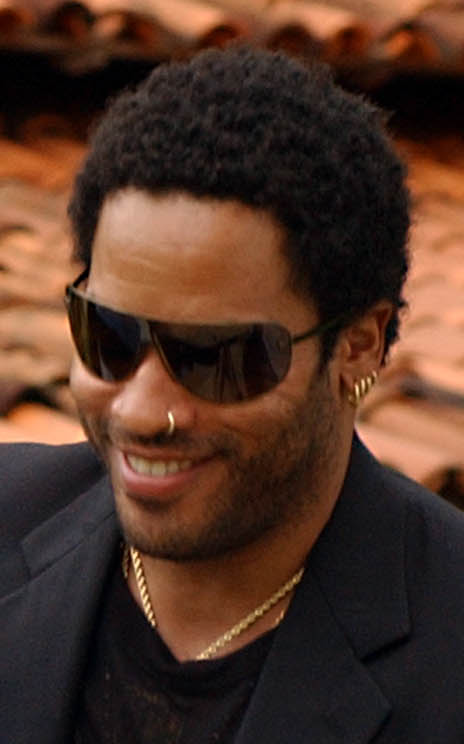
Lenny Kravitz provides guitar and backing vocals on "Something Beautiful"

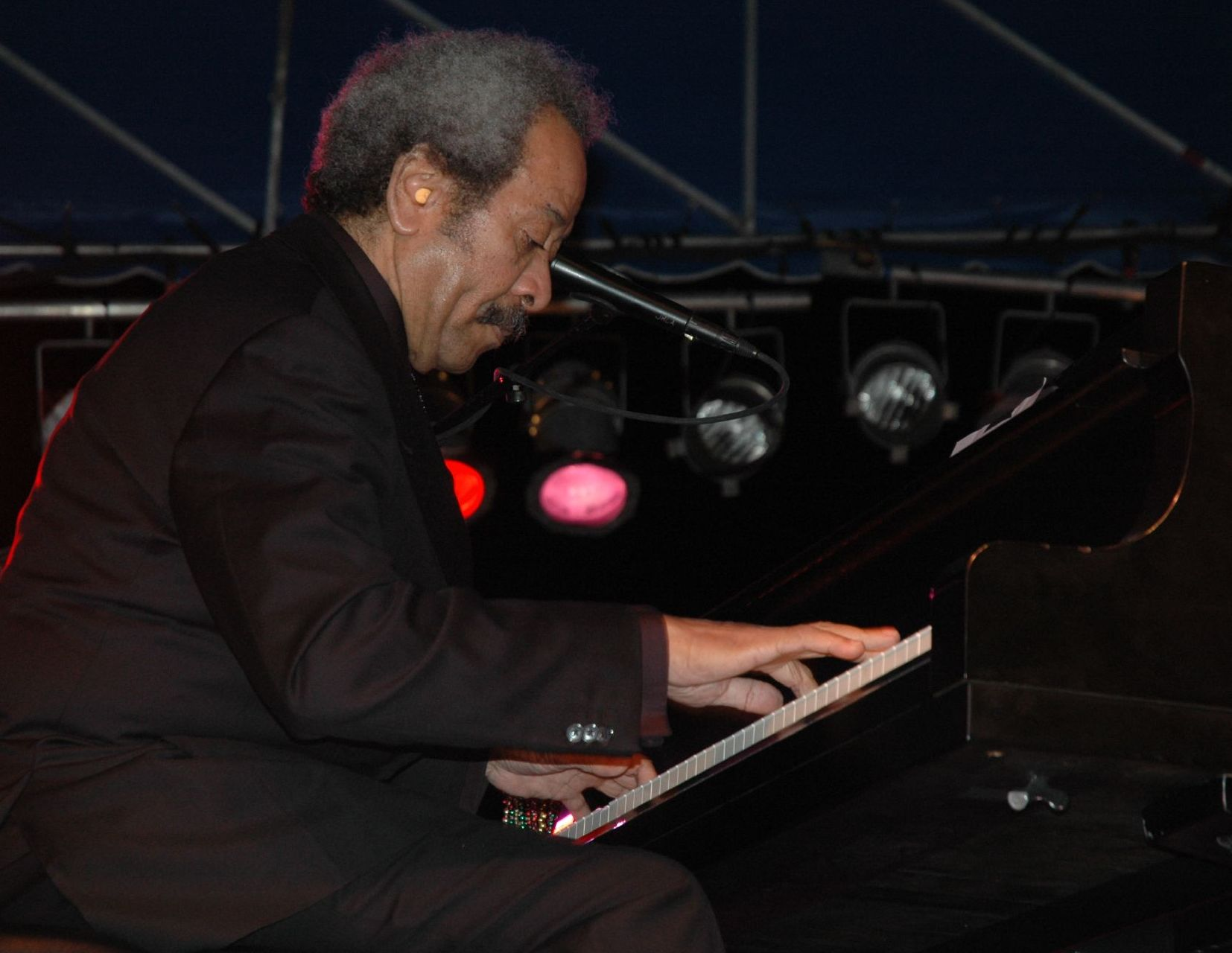
Allen Toussaint wrote and performed on "On Your Way Down"

Andrews is supported by his band Orleans Avenue: bassist Mike Ballard, guitarist Pete Murano, saxophonist Dan Oestreicher, drummer Joey Peebles, and percussionist Dwayne Williams. Andrews plays trombone and trumpet and provides lead vocals on five tracks.

Lenny Kravitz, who Andrews apprenticed under as a member of his backing band, plays guitar and sings backup on "Something Beautiful". Marc Broussard contributes backing vocals on "Right to Complain". Allen Toussaint plays piano on the only cover song, a reworking of his own "On Your Way Down".

== Reception ==
Professional ratings
Review scores
Source	Rating
Allmusic	4/5 stars
Rolling Stone	3.5/5 stars
Billboard	89/100

Nate Chinen said in The New York Times that the album is "more polished and less thrilling than Trombone Shorty's live shows" but goes on to call it "firm in its purpose with swagger to spare". He closed his review with "It's a sound born of New Orleans, unmistakably, and if it heralds an ambitious ascent, it also attests to an unbroken spirit."

Noting the wide appeal of Backatown, Carla Meyer of The Sacramento Bee wrote that it "provides comfort for fans of jazz, rock, pop, funk and however you want to classify James Bond theme music". Geoffrey Himes of The Washington Post compared Andrews's vocals to Stevie Wonder and noted that the album has "second-line rhythm that could only come from New Orleans".

Thom Jurek of Allmusic called the music "aural gumbo" and the album a "fingerpopping, butt-shakin' mix set" that "crackles and burns with an unburdened, unfettered, passionate live feel". He went on to call it "everything popular American music should be". Will Hermes of Rolling Stone said the album is "both deeply rooted and culturally omnivorous" and referred to Andrews as "a Katrina survivor trying to hold on to the old while building the new".

== Track listing ==
1. "Hurricane Season" (Troy Andrews) 3:20
2. "On Your Way Down" (Allen Toussaint) 3:36
3. "Quiet as Kept" (Andrews) 3:05
4. "Something Beautiful" (Andrews, Ryan Montbleau) 3:42
5. "Backatown" (Andrews) 2:47
6. "Right to Complain" (Andrews, PJ Morton) 2:56
7. "Neph" (Andrews) 3:02
8. "Suburbia" (Andrews, Mike Ballard, Pete Murano, Joey Peebles) 3:19
9. "In the 6th" (Andrews, Dan Oestreicher) 3:17
10. "One Night Only (The March)" (Andrews, Montbleau) 2:49
11. "Where Y' At" (Andrews, Clarence Slaughter) 2:59
12. "Fallin'" (Andrews, Morton) 3:46
13. "The Cure" (Andrews, Ballard, Murano) 3:39
14. "928 Horn Jam" (Andrews, Oestreicher, Slaughter, Dwayne Williams) 0:55

== Personnel ==
- Trombone Shorty – trombone, trumpet, drums, percussion, keyboards, vocals
- Dan Oestreicher – baritone saxophone
- Clarence Slaughter – flute, saxophone
- Pete Murano – guitar
- Mike Ballard – bass guitar
- Joey Peebles – drums
- Dwayne Williams – percussion

=== Guest musicians ===
- Lenny Kravitz – guitar solo, backing vocals on "Something Beautiful"
- Allen Toussaint – piano on "On Your Way Down"
- Marc Broussard – additional vocals on "Right to Complain"
- Charles Smith – bass synthesizer on "Backatown" and "Quiet as Kept"

=== Production ===
- Ben Ellman – producer, engineer
- Dave Barlett – executive producer, management
- Matt Cornell – executive producer, management
- Mike Kappus – executive producer, management
- Alexander Alvarez – engineer
- Kyle Lamy – engineer
- Mike Ballard – vocal engineer on "Fallin'" and "Hurricane Season"
- Charles Smith – vocal engineer on "One Night Only (The March)"
- Korey Richey – vocal engineer on "Right to Complain"
- Kirk Edwards – photography
- Kevin Reagan – design
- Vartan – art direction

== Charts ==
Year	Chart	Peak position
2010	German Albums Chart	96
2010	US Billboard Jazz Albums	3
2010	US Billboard Top Heatseekers	6
2011	Spanish Albums Chart	77
