= Parking Lot Symphony =

Studio album by Trombone Shorty
- Released: April 28, 2017
- Studio: Esplanade Studios (New Orleans, LA); Gnu Gnome (Los Angeles, CA)
- Genre: New Orleans R&B; funk; jazz
- Length: 42:43
- Label: Blue Note
- Producer: Chris Seefried

Trombone Shorty chronology
Say That to Say This (2013)	Parking Lot Symphony (2017)	Lifted (2022)

Singles from Parking Lot Symphony
- 1. "Here Come The Girls" Released: March 3, 2017; 2. "Dirty Water" Released: March 31, 2017; 3. "No Good Time" Released: April 24, 2017

Parking Lot Symphony is the fourth studio album by American musician Trombone Shorty. It was released on April 28, 2017 via Blue Note Records. Recorded at Esplanade Studios in New Orleans with additional recording at Gnu Gnome in Los Angeles, it was produced by Chris Seefried.

In the United States, the album peaked at number 148 on the Billboard 200, atop both the Jazz Albums and Contemporary Jazz Albums, and number 39 on the Top Current Album Sales charts. It also reached number 73 on the Swiss Hitparade, number 103 in the Netherlands, number 140 in France, and number-one on the Official Jazz & Blues Albums chart in the UK.

== Critical reception ==
Professional ratings
Aggregate scores
Source	Rating
Metacritic	70/100
Review scores
Source	Rating
All About Jazz	3/5 stars
AllMusic	4/5 stars
PopMatters	6/10
Record Collector	3/5 stars
Slant	4/5 stars
The Arts Desk	4/5 stars
The Guardian	3/5 stars

Parking Lot Symphony was met with generally favourable reviews from music critics. At Metacritic, which assigns a normalized rating out of 100 to reviews from mainstream publications, the album received an average score of 70 based on five reviews.

AllMusic's Matt Collar praised the album, calling it "one of Trombone Shorty's most balanced productions, equal parts New Orleans R&B sophistication and loose, block party fun". Josh Hurst of Slant wrote: "if there's a weakness here, it's that Shorty's lyrics feel like placeholders. ... The same could certainly not be said of the music, which is as rich and as complex as any he's made".

In mixed reviews, Will Layman of PopMatters described the album as "fine document of Shorty's blend of New Orleans funk, modernized brass band fire, and old school soul. Four albums into the journey, though, the formula has been varied, repeated, and--perhaps--exhausted". Charles Waring of Record Collector complemented the artist's "allusive, crossover style is a piquant marinade that blends Crescent City jazz with blues, pop, funk, R&B, hip-hop, and rock flavours". John Lewis of The Guardian stated: "the venerable label throwing everything at him in the hope that something sticks. But the horny retro soul of "No Good Time" and "It Ain't No Use" sound antiseptic when they should be down and dirty; the R&B; slugging on "Familiar" falls a little flat; while a version of "Here Come the Girls" works only because it's a note-for-note copy of the Allen Toussaint/Ernie K-Doe original".

== Track listing ==
No.	Title	Writer(s)	Length
1.	"Laveau Dirge No.1"	Troy Andrews	2:09
2.	"It Ain't No Use"	Joseph Modeliste; Leo Nocentelli; George Porter Jr.; Arthur L. Neville	4:33
3.	"Parking Lot Symphony"	Andrews; Alexander Ebert; Chris Seefried	3:47
4.	"Dirty Water"	Andrews; Ethan Gruska	3:47
5.	"Here Come the Girls"	Allen Toussaint	4:00
6.	"Tripped Out Slim"	Andrews	2:19
7.	"Familiar"	Andrews; Egbert Dawkins III; Seefried	3:19
8.	"No Good Time"	Andrews; Seefried	4:10
9.	"Where It At?"	Andrews; Kevin Griffin; Luke Foley	3:26
10.	"Fanfare"	Andrews; Peter Murano; Austin Anthony Hall	3:12
11.	"Like a Dog"	Andrews; Keith Robertson	3:17
12.	"Laveau Dirge Finale"	Andrews; Seefried; Glenn Patrick Hall III; Murano; A. Hall	4:44
Total length:			42:43

== Personnel ==
- Troy "Trombone Shorty" Andrews – vocals (tracks: 2–5, 7, 9), Wurlitzer electric piano (tracks: 3, 4, 7, 8, 10, 11), Rhodes electric piano (tracks: 3–5, 7), guitar & tuba (track 6), Hammond B3 organ (tracks: 7–10), piano (tracks: 7, 9), drums (tracks: 8, 9), snare (tracks: 9, 10, 12), percussion (track 10), tom tom (track 11), glockenspiel & vibraphone (track 12), trombone, trumpet, arrangement
- Dan Oestreicher – baritone saxophone
- BK Jackson – tenor saxophone
- Pete Murano – electric guitar (tracks: 2–12)
- Tony Hall – bass guitar (tracks: 2–12)
- Joey Peebles – drums (tracks: 2–12)
- Tracci Lee – choir (tracks: 2, 3, 8, 9, 12)
- Ashley Watson – choir (tracks: 3, 8, 9, 12)
- Chrishira Perrier – choir (tracks: 3, 8, 9, 12)
- Lonel Simmons – choir (tracks: 3, 8, 9, 12)
- Raion Ramsey – choir (tracks: 3, 8, 9, 12)
- Remonda Davis – choir (tracks: 3, 8, 9, 12)
- Ashley Doucett – choir (track 2)
- Faith Mack – choir (track 2)
- India Favorite – choir (track 2)
- Sabrina Hayes – choir (track 2)
- Chris Seefried – mellotron (tracks: 2, 3, 5, 8), sitar & glockenspiel (track 2), electric sitar & piano (track 8), producer, arrangement
- Leo Nocentelli – acoustic guitar (track 2)
- Ramon Yslas – congas (track 2), tambourine (tracks: 2, 5)
- Paul Cartwright – violin & viola (track 3)
- Ivan Neville – piano (track 5)
- Juan Pablo Covarrubias – synthesizer (track 7)
- Glenn Hall – Wurlitzer electric piano (track 12)
- Seth Atkins Horan – engineering, mixing
- Bernie Grundman – mastering
- Paul Moore – design
- Mathieu Bitton – photography

== Charts ==
=== Weekly charts ===
Chart (2017–18)	Peak position
Dutch Albums (Album Top 100)	103
French Albums (SNEP)	140
Swiss Albums (Schweizer Hitparade)	73
UK Jazz & Blues Albums (OCC)	1
US Billboard 200	148
US Top Jazz Albums (Billboard)	1
US Top Contemporary Jazz Albums (Billboard)	1
US Top Current Album Sales (Billboard)	39

=== Year-end charts ===
Chart (2017)	Position
US Top Jazz Albums (Billboard)	6
US Top Contemporary Jazz Albums (Billboard)	1
Chart (2018)	Position
US Top Contemporary Jazz Albums (Billboard)	15
