= 5th Ward Weebie =

American rapper

Background information
- Born: Jerome Henry Cosey; February 19, 1978; New Orleans, Louisiana, U.S.
- Died: January 9, 2020 (aged 41)
- Genres: New Orleans bounce; rap
- Occupation: Rapper

Jerome Henry Cosey (February 19, 1978 – January 9, 2020), known professionally as 5th Ward Weebie, was an American rapper.

== Life and career ==
Cosey was born in New Orleans, Louisiana, the son of Henry Reddick. He raised in the 5th Ward in his hometon, and his pseudonym 5th Ward Weebie came from his grandmother. He began rapping in the late 1990s, and in 1999, he released his debut album Show the World. In 2000, he collaborated with Kane & Abel on the single Shake It Like a Dog, and in 2002, he collaborated with Mister P on the single Rock It.

Later in his career, in 2005, Cosey released the single Fuck Katrina when Hurricane Katrina struck New Orleans. After New Orleans was struck, he relocated to Houston, Texas. In 2006, he released his mixtape Bounce King Status, and in 2014, he released the single Let Me Find Out. His single was listed in Rolling Stone's 20 Essential New Orleans Bounce Songs in 2018. In the same year, he made a cameo in Drake's hit single Nice for What, and in 2019, he released the single Get Out The Way.

== Death ==
Cosey died from related complications of a ruptured artery at a hospital on January 9, 2020, at the age of 41.
