= The Road (film score) =

The Road (Original Film Score)

Film score by Nick Cave and Warren Ellis
- Released: November 22, 2009
- Studio: AIR Studios, London
- Genre: Film score
- Length: 46:46
- Label: Mute Records
- Producer: Gerard McCann; Jake Jackson; Nick Cave; Warren Ellis

Nick Cave and Warren Ellis chronology
The Assassination of Jesse James by the Coward Robert Ford (2007)	The Road (2009)	Lawless (2012)

The Road (Original Film Score) is the film score to the 2009 film The Road directed by John Hillcoat starring Viggo Mortensen and Kodi Smit-McPhee. The original score was composed by Nick Cave and Warren Ellis and released through Mute Records on November 22, 2009. A vinyl edition of the film score was released, a decade later, on August 2, 2019.

== Background ==
After scoring the award-winning music for the Western drama The Proposition (2005), the composer duo Nick Cave and Warren Ellis reunited with the director John Hillcoat for The Road. The score emphasizes piano and violins. Cave and Ellis wrote the music for the film during the production, instead of writing music during the post-production where usually composers write for a final cut. Ellis admitted that they watched several different cuts which varied greatly and recalled that Hillcoat had strong idea about placement and style. The composers associated with their norm music editor Gerard McCann.

Ellis added that they had improvised the music multiple times in order to be flexible and suit the changes made to the film. He noted that in their past two films—The Proposition and The Assassination of Jesse James by the Coward Robert Ford (2007)—the editing has gone on way past the date they completed recording the music. However, he and Cave constantly tried to hold it back, keeping it minimal and not overloading the scenes, despite minimal issues. Speaking to Luke Turner of The Quietus, the interviewer noticed the piano refrain resembled Ludwig van Beethoven's Piano Sonata No. 14, though the composers denied discussing on the piece, and even though, Ellis noted that their theme "lacks the tension and resolve in that piece" and the emotional arc was much different to their score. They denied the resemblance, and instead their main theme was related to the journey and the father-son bonding, while the film was soaked in the mother's absence and resonated throughout the film. They wanted the audience to be drawn into the journey of the father-son bond and earth as its turmoil.

Cave and Ellis completed recording the music by September 2009, three days before the film's premiere at the 66th Venice International Film Festival. The team and the producers listened to their recording and were pleased with their work.

== Reception ==
Jonathan Broxton of Movie Music UK wrote "This isn’t a score which will appeal to score fans who enjoy tender, lyrical music; although the melodic core is always there, Cave intentionally makes a lot of his music cold, distant, unapproachable, and a little on the harsh side. While this suits the film to a tee, and although I liked it a lot, it doesn’t make for easy listening." Joep de Bruijn of Maintitles wrote "The Road is yet another fantastic score by Nick Cave and Warren Ellis. It's not to be missed if you enjoyed The Assassination of Jesse James by the Coward Robert Ford." Louis Pattison of BBC wrote "Given the subject matter, it could have been bleak, monochromatic even – but here, in the hands of Cave and Ellis, hope springs eternal." Hugh Montgomery of The Guardian called it "a sparely accomplished work, in which plaintive piano and violin combine to evoke the desolate tenderness of the central father-son relationship, while occasional bursts of industrial, percussion-driven noise point to the unfolding terror."

Jeremy Allen of The Quietus wrote "Where so many soundtracks fall down is that they either work as fragmented incidental accompaniments or they stand as great pieces of music that are irreconcilable with the action, but The Road manages both." Ludovic Hunter-Tilney of Financial Times wrote "Sparse piano fugues and frosty violin conjure an appropriately unforgiving mood, with the odd shift of gear into shrieking slasher movie mode." Thom Jurek of AllMusic wrote "As music, however, without that visual context, it's so minimal that it feels like a series of pieces that never quite resolve. Ultimately, when heard apart from its cinematic counterpart, it is the least memorable of the scores Cave and Ellis have recorded together, but is a pleasant, if not riveting, listening experience."

Paul Clarke of Drowned in Sound wrote "what really makes both the story of The Road and its soundtrack work so well together isn’t the stark and searing portrayal of humanity’s potential fate complemented by music both tender and sparse. Rather, it's the fact that both have a strong and almost symbiotic relationship as their foundation: one between a fictive father and son struggling for survival, and one between two inspired musicians equally sensitive to each other and the demands and possibilities of storytelling through soundtracks." Phlilip Cosores of Consequence wrote "if you are simply a fan of Cave's work with the Bad Seeds or The Birthday Party, this score will simply be a footnote to that rich catalogue." Roison O'Connor of The Independent wrote "its themes of "absence and loss" audibly informed the writing of the score: a lesson in atmospherics, even if you never watch the film."

== Track listing ==
No.	Title	Length
1.	"Home"	02:04
2.	"The Road"	03:41
3.	"Storytime"	02:24
4.	"The Cannibals"	02:08
5.	"Water and Ash"	01:27
6.	"The Mother"	02:46
7.	"The Real Thing"	02:32
8.	"Memory"	03:42
9.	"The House"	03:16
10.	"The Far Road"	02:44
11.	"The Church"	01:34
12.	"The Journey"	04:14
13.	"The Cellar"	01:17
14.	"The Bath"	02:22
15.	"The Family"	03:36
16.	"The Beach"	03:50
17.	"The Boy"	03:09
Total length:		46:46

== Promotional score ==
A promotional CD was released in late-2009 as a part of the For Your Consideration campaign.

No.	Title	Length
1.	"On the Road"
2.	"Road Gang"
3.	"That's My Job"
4.	"A Treat for You"
5.	"Into the Darkness"
6.	"Escape"
7.	"Starving"
8.	"Leaving the Bunker"
9.	"Still Fighting"
10.	"To the Sea"
11.	"Barefoot Chase"
12.	"Sign of Life"
13.	"If I Were God"
14.	"Passing On"
15.	"The Veteran"
16.	"Saying Goodbye & Main on End"
17.	"End Crawl"

== Personnel ==
Credits adapted from liner notes:

- Music composers – Nick Cave, Warren Ellis
- Producers – Gerard McCann, Jake Jackson, Nick Cave, Warren Ellis
- Arrangement – Matt Dunkley
- Recording – Adam Miller, Jake Jackson
- Mixing – Gerard McCann, Jake Jackson
- Mastering – Ray Staff
- Music editor – Gerard McCann

Orchestra

- Conductor – Matt Dunkley
- Orchestra contractor – Isobel Griffiths
- Assistant orchestra contractor – Lucy Whalley
- Orchestra leader – Thomas Bowes

Instruments

- Bass – Martyn P. Casey, Chris Laurence
- Cello – Gerard McCann, Jonathan Williams
- Ethnic percussion – Paul Clarvis
- Viola – Peter Lale
- Violin – Warren Zielinski

Cover artwork

- Design – Tom Hingston Studio
- Photography – Javier Aguirresarobe

== Release history ==
Region	Date	Format(s)	Label(s)	Ref.
Various	November 22, 2009	Digital download; streaming	Mute Records	
Various	November 22, 2009	CD	Mute Records	
Various	August 2, 2019	LP	Mute Records	
