= Link Wray =

American guitarist (1929–2005)

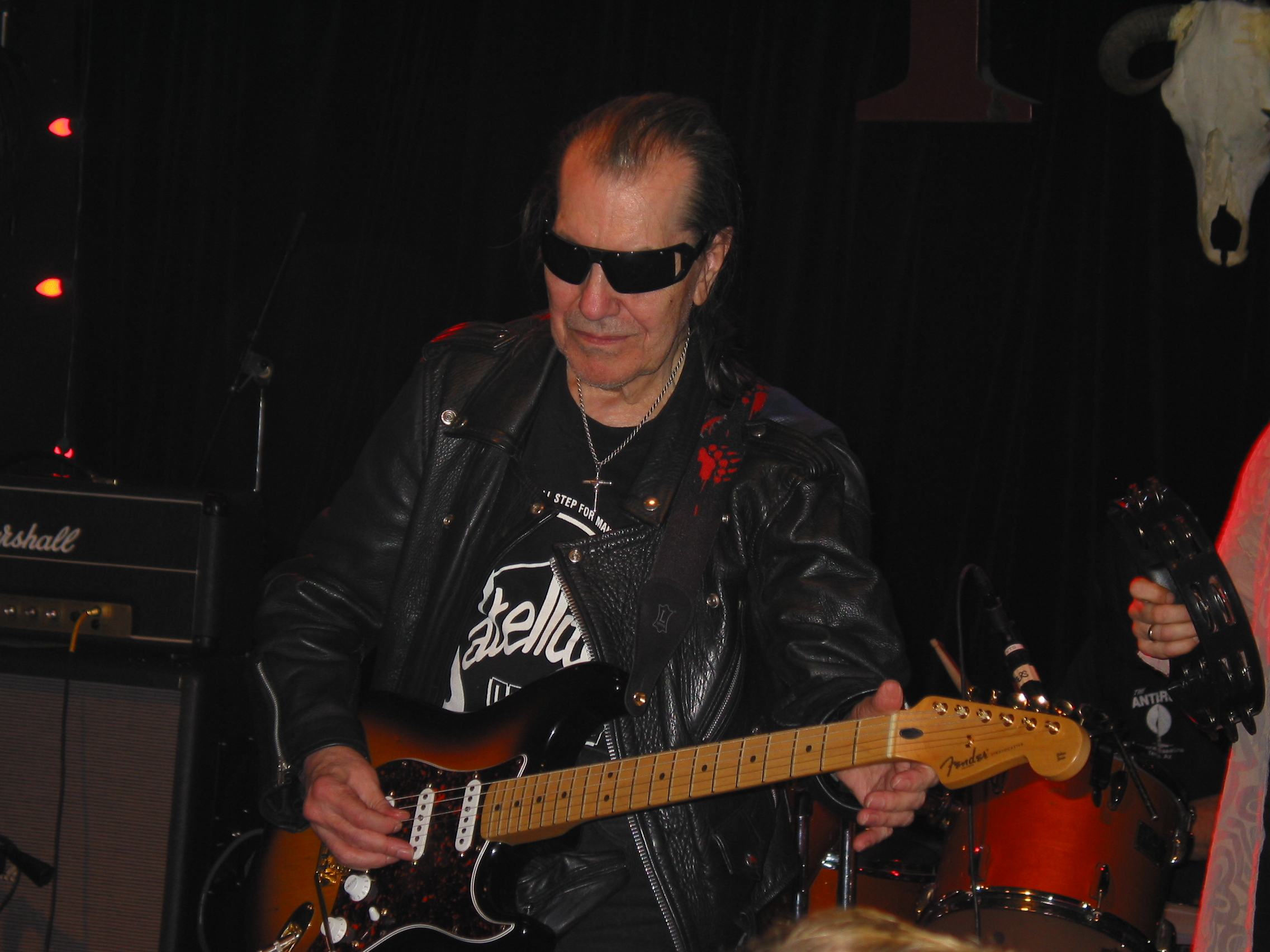
- Wray performing in July 2005

Background information
- Born: Fred Lincoln Wray Jr. May 2, 1929; Dunn, North Carolina, U.S.
- Origin: Portsmouth, Virginia, U.S.
- Died: November 5, 2005 (aged 76) Copenhagen, Denmark
- Genres: Rock and roll; country; rockabilly; surf; garage rock; country rock; swamp rock; hard rock; Instrumental rock
- Occupations: Musician; songwriter
- Instruments: Guitar; vocals; steel guitar; bass guitar
- Years active: 1955–2005
- Website: www.linkwray.com

Fred Lincoln "Link" Wray Jr. (May 2, 1929 – November 5, 2005) was an American guitarist, songwriter, and vocalist who became popular in the late 1950s. His 1958 instrumental single "Rumble" reached the top 20 in the United States, and was one of the earliest songs in rock music to use distortion and tremolo.

Rolling Stone ranked Wray at No. 45 on its list of the 100 greatest guitarists of all time. He received two nominations for the Rock and Roll Hall of Fame, prior to being inducted in the Musical Influence category in 2023.

== Early life ==
Wray was born on May 2, 1929, in Dunn, North Carolina, to Fred Lincoln Wray Sr. and Lillian Mae (née Coats), whom her son identified as being of Shawnee descent. Wray recalled living in very harsh conditions during childhood, in mud huts, without electricity or heating, going to school barefoot, barely clothed. He recounted that his family experienced discrimination, including times when they had to hide from the Ku Klux Klan. Wray later said: "The cops, the sheriff, the drugstore owner—they were all Ku Klux Klan. They put the masks on and, if you did something wrong, they'd tie you to a tree and whip you or kill you." His family listed themselves as White on census records. Three songs Wray performed during his career were named for Indigenous peoples: "Shawnee", "Apache", and "Comanche".

Wray lived with his family in Portsmouth, Virginia, from 1942 to 1955. He and his brothers Ray and Doug drove cabs during the day while working at night clubs in the Portsmouth and Norfolk, Virginia, area. Wray's first bands, The Lucky Wray Band and The Palomino Ranch Gang, formed in Portsmouth and included brothers Ray, Doug, and Vernon and two other musicians, Dixie Neal and Shorty Horton.

Wray served in the U.S. Army during the Korean War (1950–53). He contracted tuberculosis, which hospitalized him for a year. His stay concluded with the removal of a lung, which doctors predicted would mean he would never be able to sing again.

== Career ==
Building on the distorted electric guitar sound of early records, Wray's first hit was the 1958 instrumental "Rumble". The record was first released on Cadence Records (catalog number 1347) as by "Link Wray & His Ray Men". "Rumble" was banned in New York and Boston for fear that it would incite teenage gang violence, "rumble" being slang for a gang fight.

Before, during, and after his stints with major labels Epic and Swan, Wray released 45s under many names. Tiring of the corporate music machine, he began recording albums using a three-track studio he converted from an outbuilding on his brother's property that his father used to raise chickens, in Accokeek, Maryland. He wrote and recorded the LP Link Wray (1971), on which he wrote about his frustrations. The Neville Brothers have recorded two tracks from it, "Fallin' Rain" and "Fire and Brimstone".

While living in the San Francisco Bay Area in the early 1970s, Wray was introduced to Quicksilver Messenger Service guitarist John Cipollina by bassist James "Hutch" Hutchinson. He subsequently formed a band initially featuring special guest Cipollina along with the rhythm section from Cipollina's band Copperhead, bassist Hutch Hutchinson, and drummer David Weber. They opened for the band Lighthouse at the Whisky a Go Go in Los Angeles from May 15–19, 1974. He later did numerous concerts and radio broadcasts in the Bay Area, including at KSAN and at promoter Bill Graham's Winterland Ballroom venue, with Les Lizama later replacing Hutchinson on bass. He toured and recorded two albums with retro-rockabilly artist Robert Gordon in the late 1970s. The 1980s to the present day saw a large number of reissues as well as new material. One member of his band in the 1980s, session drummer Anton Fig, later became drummer in the CBS Orchestra on the Late Show with David Letterman. In 1994, Wray played on four songs of the album Chatterton by French rocker Alain Bashung. He went on to release two albums of new music: Shadowman (1997) and Barbed Wire (2000).

In November 2017, Easy Eye Records announced the future release of two recently discovered recordings, "Son of Rumble", presumably a follow-up to 1958's "Rumble", and "Whole Lotta Talking", recorded in 1970. The recordings were issued as a 45 rpm single in April 2018. Easy Eye released another 45 rpm single of newly discovered/unreleased material for Record Store Day 2019, "Vernon's Diamond" b/w "My Brother, My Son". "Vernon's Diamond" was recorded circa 1958–59 and is an early version of "Ace of Spades", and "My Brother, My Son" was recorded at the same sessions as "Whole Lotta Talking" in 1970.

== Personal life and death ==
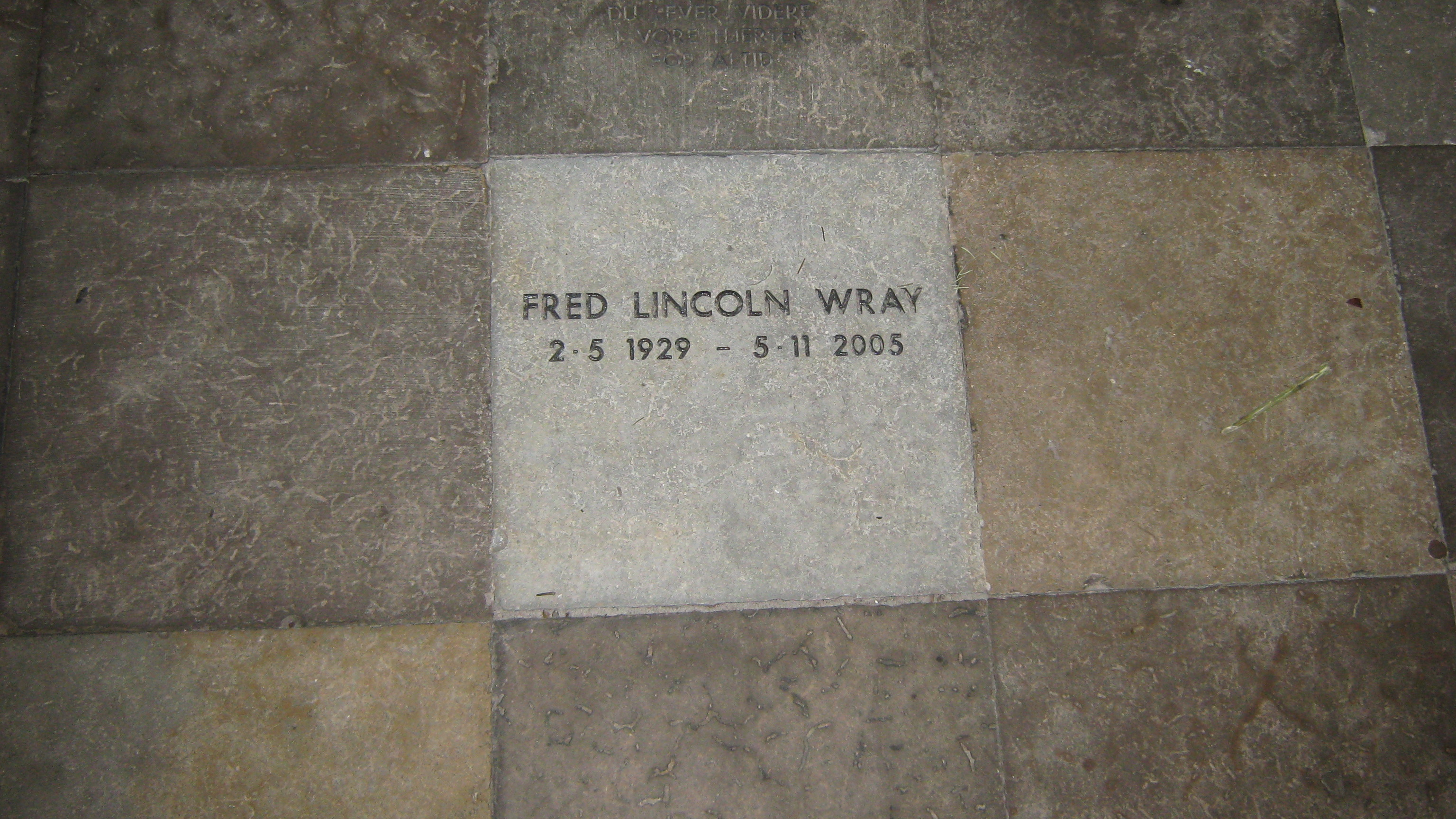
Link Wray's grave

Wray's first three marriages, to Elizabeth Canady Wray, Ethel Tidwell Wray, and Sharon Cole Wray, produced eight children. In the early 1980s, Wray relocated to Denmark and married Olive Poulsen, who became his manager.

Wray died of heart failure at his home in Copenhagen, on November 5, 2005, at the age of 76. He was survived by his nine children, 24 grandchildren, and two great-grandchildren. Wray was cremated, and his ashes were buried in the crypt of the Christian's Church, Copenhagen.

== Musical style and influence ==
Link Wray's 1950s recordings "straddled country and rockabilly". He later performed surf-influenced garage rock in the 1960s, swamp rock and country rock in the early 1970s and hard rock in the late 1970s and onward.

Wray is credited with inventing the power chord. According to AllMusic's Cub Koda, Wray's instrumental recordings starting with "Rumble" through his Swan singles in the early 1960s laid the blueprints for "heavy metal, thrash, you name it." "Rumble" facilitated the emergence of "punk and heavy rock", according to Jeremy Simmonds.

Wray has influenced a wide range of artists. Jimmy Page described Link Wray as having a "real rebel attitude" and credited Wray in the documentary It Might Get Loud as a major influence in his early career. According to Rolling Stone, Pete Townshend of The Who once said, "If it hadn't been for Link Wray and 'Rumble,' I never would have picked up a guitar." Mark E. Smith of The Fall wrote in his autobiography: "The only people I ever really looked up to were Link Wray and Iggy Pop ... Guys like [Wray] are very special to me." Iggy Pop and Neil Young have also cited Wray as an influence on their work.

Bob Dylan refers to Wray in his song "Sign Language", which he recorded as a duet with Eric Clapton in 1975: "Link Wray was playin' on a juke box I was payin'/ for the words I was saying, so misunderstood/he didn't do me no good." Both Dylan and Bruce Springsteen performed Wray's tune "Rumble" in concert as a tribute to the influential musician upon his 2005 death. In 2007, musician Steven Van Zandt inducted Link Wray into the Native American Music Hall of Fame with a tribute performance by his grandson Chris Webb and Native artist Gary Small.

== Discography ==
=== Singles ===
Release date	A-side	B-side	Label	Catalog number	US
March 1958	"Rumble"	"The Swag"	Cadence	1347	16
January 1959	"Raw-Hide"	"Dixie-Doodle"	Epic	5-9300	23
June 1959	"Comanche"	"Lillian"	Epic	5-9321	
October 1959	"Slinky"	"Rendezvous"	Epic	5-9343	
February 1960	"Trail of the Lonesome Pine"	"Golden Strings" (Based on a Chopin etude)	Epic	5-9361	
1960	"Roughshod" [released as by Ray Vernon & The Raymen]	"Vendetta" [released as by Ray Vernon & The Raymen]	Scottie	1320	
October 1960	"Ain't That Lovin' You Babe"	"Mary Ann"	Epic	5-9419	
July 1961	"Jack the Ripper"	"The Stranger"	Rumble	1000	
August 1961	"El Toro"	"Tijuana"	Epic	5-9454	
November 1961	"Evil Angel" [A-side by Ray Vernon]	"Danger One Way Love" [B-side by Ray Vernon with Link Wray & His Raymen]	Rumble	1349	
April 1962	"Poppin' Popeye"	"Big City Stomp"	Trans Atlas	M-687	
October 1962	"Hold It" [released as by Ray Vernon & The Raymen]	"Big City After Dark" [released as by Ray Vernon & The Raymen]	Mala	456	
January 1963	"Dancing Party"	"There's a Hole in the Middle of the Moon"	Mala	458	
February 1963	"Hambone" [A-side by Red Saunders & His Orchestra with Dolores Hawkins & The Hambone Kids]	"Rumble Mambo" [B-side by Link Wray & The Wraymen]	OKeh	4-7166	
March 1963	"Jack the Ripper" [reissue]	"The Black Widow"	Swan	S-4137	64
September 1963	"Week End"	"Turnpike U.S.A."	Swan	S-4154	
November 1963	"The Sweeper"	"Run Chicken Run"	Swan	S-4163	
February 1964	"The Shadow Knows"	"My Alberta"	Swan	S-4171	
July 1964	"Deuces Wild"	"Summer Dream"	Swan	S-4187	
February 1965	"Good Rockin' Tonight"	"I'll Do Anything for You"	Swan	S-4201	
April 1965	"I'm Branded"	"Hang On"	Swan	S-4211	
never released/withdrawn from schedule (originally set for mid-1965)	"Please Please Me"	"Rumble '65"	Swan	S-4221	
July 1965	"Baby, What'cha Want Me"	"Walkin' Down the Street Called Love"	Diamond	D-186	
October 1965	"Girl from the North Country"	"You Hurt Me So"	Swan	S-4232	
December 1965	"Ace of Spades"	"The Fuzz"	Swan	S-4239	
February 1966	"Batman Theme" (with Bobby Howard)	"Alone"	Swan	S-4244	
July 1966	"Hidden Charms"	"Ace of Spades" [alternate version]	Swan	S-4261	
October 1966	"Let the Good Times Roll" (with Kathy Lynn)	"Soul Train"	Swan	S-4273	
1967	"Jack the Ripper" [reissue]	"I'll Do Anything for You" [reissue]	Swan	S-4282	
1968	"Rumble '68"	"Blow Your Mind"	Heavy	H-101	
February 1969	"Rumble–69"	"Mind Blower"	Mr. G (an imprint of Audio Fidelity)	G-820	
July 1971	"Fire and Brimstone"	"Juke Box Mama"	Polydor	PD-14084	
October 1971	"Fallin' Rain"	"Juke Box Mama"	Polydor	PD-14096	
1973	"Shine the Light"	"Lawdy Miss Clawdy"	Polydor	PD-14188	
1973	"I'm So Glad, I'm So Proud"	"Shawnee Tribe"	Virgin [UK]	VS-103	
1974	"I Got to Ramble" (Dedicated to the memory of Duane Allman)	"She's That Kind of Woman"	Polydor	PD-14256	
1974	"It Was a Bad Scene"	"Backwoods Preacher Man"	Polydor [UK]	2066 366	
1975	"I Know You're Leaving Me Now"	"Quicksand"	Virgin [UK]	VS-142	
June 1979	"It's All Over Now, Baby Blue"	"Just That Kind"	Charisma [UK]	CB-333	
April 2018	"Son of Rumble"	"Whole Lotta Talking"	Easy Eye Records	566577-7	
April 2019	"Vernon's Diamond"	"My Brother, My Son"	Easy Eye Sound	EES-009	

Wray was a featured collaborator on Robert Gordon's 1977 single "Red Hot" (Private Stock 45–156). The single peaked at No. 83 on the Billboard Hot 100 chart.

=== Albums ===
Release date	Title	Label	Catalog Number
1960 US	Link Wray & The Wraymen	Epic	LN 3661
1962 US	Great Guitar Hits by Link Wray and His Raymen	Vermillion	LP-1924
1963 US	Jack the Ripper	Swan	S-LP 510
1964 US	Link Wray Sings and Plays Guitar	Vermillion	LP-1925
1969 US	Yesterday – Today	Record Factory	LP-1929
1971 US	Link Wray	Polydor	PD-24-4064
1971 US	Mordicai Jones (with Bobby Howard)	Polydor	PD-5010
1973 US	Beans and Fatback (rec. 1971)	Virgin	V-2006
1973 US	Be What You Want To	Polydor	PD-5047
1974 US	The Link Wray Rumble	Polydor	PD-6025
1974 US	Listen to the Voices That Want to Be Free (with Joey Welz; rec. 1969–70) [reissued in 2013 as Rumble & Roll on Rokarola/Music Avenue 250346]	Music City	MCR-5003
1975 US	Stuck in Gear	Virgin	V-2050
1979 US	Bullshot	Visa/Passport/Gem	VISA 7009
1980 US	Live at the Paradiso [at the Paradiso, Amsterdam]	Visa/Passport/Gem	VISA 7010
1985 UK	Live in '85	Big Beat	WIK 42; CDWIK 972
1989 DE	Born to Be Wild: Live in the U.S.A. 1987	Line	LICD 9.00690
1989 UK	Rumble Man	Ace	CH 266
1990 UK	Apache	Ace	CH 286; CDCHD 931
1990 UK	Wild Side of the City Lights	Ace	CH 296; CDCHD 931
1993 DK	Indian Child	Epic/Sony Music	EPC 473100 2
1997 US	Shadowman	Hip-O/UMe	HIPD-40069
1997 US	Walking Down a Street Called Love [live]	Cult Music/Cleopatra	CLP-9989
2000 UK	Barbed Wire	Ace	CDCHD 770
2019 UK	Link Sings Elvis [10" LP]	Ace	10CHD 1553

=== Compilations ===
Release date	Title	Label	Catalog Number
1978 UK	Link Wray: Early Recordings	Chiswick/Ace	CH 6; CDCHD 1460
1982 UK	Good Rockin' Tonight	Chiswick/Ace	CH 69; CDCHD 1460
1987 UK	Growling Guitar	Big Beat	WIK 65; CDWIK 972
1989 UK	The Original Rumble: Plus 22 Other Storming Guitar Instrumentals	Ace	CDCH 924
1989 UK	The Swan Demos '64 [reissued in 2005 as Law of the Jungle! The Swan Demos '64 on Sundazed SC-6221]	Hangman	HANG-31 UP
1990 UK	Jack The Ripper [reissued in 1994 on Forevermore FVR-5002; and again in 2005 on Sundazed LP-5192]	Hangman	HANG-33 UP
1990 US	Hillbilly Wolf: Missing Links Vol. 1	Norton	ED 210
1990 US	Big City After Dark: Missing Links Vol. 2	Norton	ED 211
1990 US	Some Kinda Nut: Missing Links Vol. 3	Norton	ED 212
1992 US	Walkin' With Link	Epic/Legacy	EK 47904
1993 US	Rumble! The Best of Link Wray	Rhino	R2 71222
1995 US	Guitar Preacher: The Polydor Years [2CD]	Chronicles/Polydor	527 717
1995 US	Mr. Guitar: Original Swan Recordings [2CD]	Norton	CED 242
1997 US	Streets of Chicago: Missing Links Volume 4	Norton	ED 253
1997 UK	Robert Gordon with Link Wray / Fresh Fish Special [2-LP-on-1-CD; with extra bonus track: "Endless Sleep"]	Ace	CDCHD 656
1997 UK	The Swan Singles Collection 1963–1967 [reissued in 2004 on Sundazed LP-5178]	Rollercoaster	RCCD 3011
2002 US	Slinky! The Epic Sessions '58–'61 [2CD]	Sundazed	SC-11098
2002 UK	Law of the Jungle	Ace	CDCHD 837
2004 UK	"They're Outta Here", Says Archie [first issue of the unreleased 1958 Cadence album, rejected by label boss Archie Bleyer]	Rollercoaster	RCCD 3032
2006 US	White Lightning: Lost Cadence Sessions '58	Sundazed	SC-11137
2007 UK	King of the Wild Guitar	Ace	CDCHD 1143
2007 UK	The Pathway Sessions (includes the albums Apache, Wild Side of the City Lights)	Ace	CDCHD 1154
2015 UK	3-Track Shack [2CD] (includes the albums Link Wray, Mordicai Jones, Beans and Fatback)	Ace	CDCH2 1451

=== With Robert Gordon ===
Release date	Title	Label	Number
1977 US	Robert Gordon with Link Wray	Private Stock; 1979 reissue: RCA Victor; 1997 CD reissue: One Way; 2015 CD reissue: Culture Factory	PS 2030; AFL1-3296; OW-34493; CFU-0388 (850703003880)
1978 US	Fresh Fish Special	Private Stock; 1979 reissue: RCA Victor; 1997 CD reissue: One Way; 2015 CD reissue: Culture Factory	PS 7008; AFL1-3299; OW-34491; CFU-0387 (850703003873)
2014 US	Robert Gordon / Link Wray: Cleveland '78 [live]	Rock-A-Billy/Cleopatra	CLP-CD-1952
