= The Road (2009 film) =

2009 film directed by John Hillcoat

- Theatrical release poster
- Directed by: John Hillcoat
- Screenplay by: Joe Penhall
- Based on: The Road by Cormac McCarthy
- Produced by: Nick Wechsler; Steve Schwartz; Paula Mae Schwartz
- Starring: Viggo Mortensen; Kodi Smit-McPhee; Robert Duvall; Guy Pearce; Charlize Theron; Molly Parker; Garret Dillahunt
- Cinematography: Javier Aguirresarobe
- Edited by: Jon Gregory
- Music by: Nick Cave; Warren Ellis
- Production company: 2929 Productions
- Distributed by: Dimension Films
- Release dates: September 3, 2009 (VIFF); September 13, 2009 (TIFF); November 25, 2009 (United States)
- Running time: 111 minutes
- Country: United States
- Language: English
- Budget: $25 million
- Box office: $27.6 million

The Road is a 2009 American survival film directed by John Hillcoat and written by Joe Penhall, based on the 2006 novel of the same name by Cormac McCarthy. The film stars Viggo Mortensen and Kodi Smit-McPhee as a father and his son in a post-apocalyptic wasteland.

The film received a limited release in North American cinemas from November 25, 2009, and was released in United Kingdom cinemas on January 4, 2010. It received generally positive reviews from critics; the performances of Mortensen and Smit-McPhee garnered praise. It also received numerous nominations, including a BAFTA nomination for Best Cinematography.

== Plot ==
A man and his young son struggle to survive after an unspecified catastrophe results in an extinction event, which causes the death of all plant life and virtually all animal life. The man and boy travel on a road to the coast in hope that they can find safe haven, scavenging for supplies in their journey, and avoiding roaming cannibalistic gangs armed with guns.

Years earlier, the man's wife gives birth to their son shortly after the catastrophe and she gradually loses hope. When the man shoots an intruder using one of three bullets they have saved for their family as a last resort, she accuses him of wasting the bullet deliberately to prevent her suicide. Removing her coat and hat in the freezing cold, she walks into the woods, never to be seen again.

In the present, after shooting a member of a gang of cannibals who stumbles upon them, the man is left with only one bullet. Exploring a mansion, he and the boy discover people locked in the basement, imprisoned as food for their captors. When the cannibals return, the man and his son hide. With discovery imminent, the man prepares to shoot his son, but they flee when the cannibals are distracted by the escaping captives.

Further down the road, the man and boy discover an underground shelter full of canned food and supplies. They feast and bathe. When they hear noises above, including a dog, the man decides it is too dangerous to remain and they move on. They meet a near-blind old man, and the son persuades the father to share food with him. Later, the two encounter a campsite with infants' skulls on pikes. They are hurriedly moving away from this campsite when they witness a cheering mob descend upon a mother and her son in a meadow, and flee as the mob murders the two.

At the coast, the man leaves the boy to guard their possessions while he swims out to scavenge a beached ship. The boy falls asleep and their supplies are stolen. The man chases down the thief and takes everything from him, even his clothes. This distresses the boy so much the man turns back and leaves the clothes and a can of food for the thief, who has since disappeared.

As they pass through a ruined town, the man is shot in the leg with an arrow. He kills his ambusher with a flare gun he found on the ship and finds the archer's female companion in the same room. The man thinks the archer and woman were following them, but she claims it was the other way around. He leaves her weeping over the body.

Weakened, the man and boy abandon their cart and most of their possessions. The man's condition deteriorates and eventually, he dies. The boy is approached by a man with his wife, two children, and dog. The wife explains they have been following the boy and his father for some time and were worried about him. The father convinces the boy he is one of the "good guys" and takes him under his protection.

== Cast ==
In the film, only one of the characters (the old man) is given a name, Ely. The credits give their roles in place of names.

- Viggo Mortensen as Man
- Kodi Smit-McPhee as Boy
- Charlize Theron as Woman, the man's wife (appearing in a series of flashbacks). Theron was a fan of the book and had worked with producer Nick Wechsler on the 2000 film The Yards. The woman has a larger role in the film than in the book, with Hillcoat stating "I think it's fine to depart from the book as long as you maintain the spirit of it."
- Robert Duvall as Ely the Old Man
- Guy Pearce as Veteran, a father wandering with his family
- Molly Parker as Motherly Woman, the Veteran's wife
- Michael K. Williams as Thief
- Garret Dillahunt as Gang Member
- Gina Preciado as Well Fed Woman
- Mary Rawson as Well Fed Woman 2

== Production ==
Filmmakers sought bleak scenery for the backdrop of the post-apocalyptic United States.

In November 2006, producer Nick Wechsler used independent financing to acquire the film rights to adapt the 2006 novel The Road by Cormac McCarthy. When Wechsler had watched John Hillcoat's 2005 film The Proposition after reading The Road, the producer decided to pursue Hillcoat to direct the film adaptation. Wechsler described Hillcoat's style: "There was something beautiful in the way John captured the stark primitive humanity of the West in that movie." In April 2007, Joe Penhall was hired to script the adapted screenplay. Wechsler and his fellow producers Steve and Paula Mae Schwartz planned to have a script and an actor cast to portray the father before pursuing a distributor for the film. By the following November, actor Viggo Mortensen had entered negotiations with the filmmakers to portray the father, though he was occupied with filming Appaloosa in New Mexico.

The film had a budget of $20 million. Filming began in the Pittsburgh metropolitan area in late February 2008, continuing for eight weeks before moving on to northwestern Pennsylvania, Louisiana and Oregon. Hillcoat preferred to shoot in real locations, saying "We didn't want to go the CGI world." Pennsylvania, where most of the filming took place, was chosen for its tax breaks and its abundance of locations that looked abandoned or decayed: coalfields, dunes, and run-down parts of Pittsburgh and neighboring boroughs. Filming was also done at Conneaut Lake Park two months after the park's Dreamland Ballroom was destroyed in a fire. Hillcoat said of using Pittsburgh as a practical location, "It's a beautiful place in fall with the colors changing, but in winter, it can be very bleak. There are city blocks that are abandoned. The woods can be brutal." Filmmakers shot scenes in parts of New Orleans that had been ravaged by Hurricane Katrina and on Mount St. Helens in Washington. The Abandoned Pennsylvania Turnpike, a stretch of abandoned roadway between Hustontown and Breezewood, Pennsylvania, was used for much of the production.

Hillcoat sought to make the film faithful to the spirit of the book, creating "a world in severe trauma", although the circumstances of the apocalyptic event are never explained. Hillcoat said "That's what makes it more realistic, then it immediately becomes about survival and how you get through each day as opposed to what actually happened." Filmmakers took advantage of days with bad weather to portray the post-apocalyptic environment. Mark Forker, the director of special effects for the film, sought to make the landscape convincing, handling sky replacement and digitally removing greenery from scenes.

== Music ==
The Road (Original Film Score) is the film score to the 2009 film The Road directed by John Hillcoat starring Viggo Mortensen and Kodi Smit-McPhee. The original score was composed by Nick Cave and Warren Ellis and released through Mute Records on November 22, 2009. A vinyl edition of the film score was released, a decade later, on August 2, 2019.

== Release ==
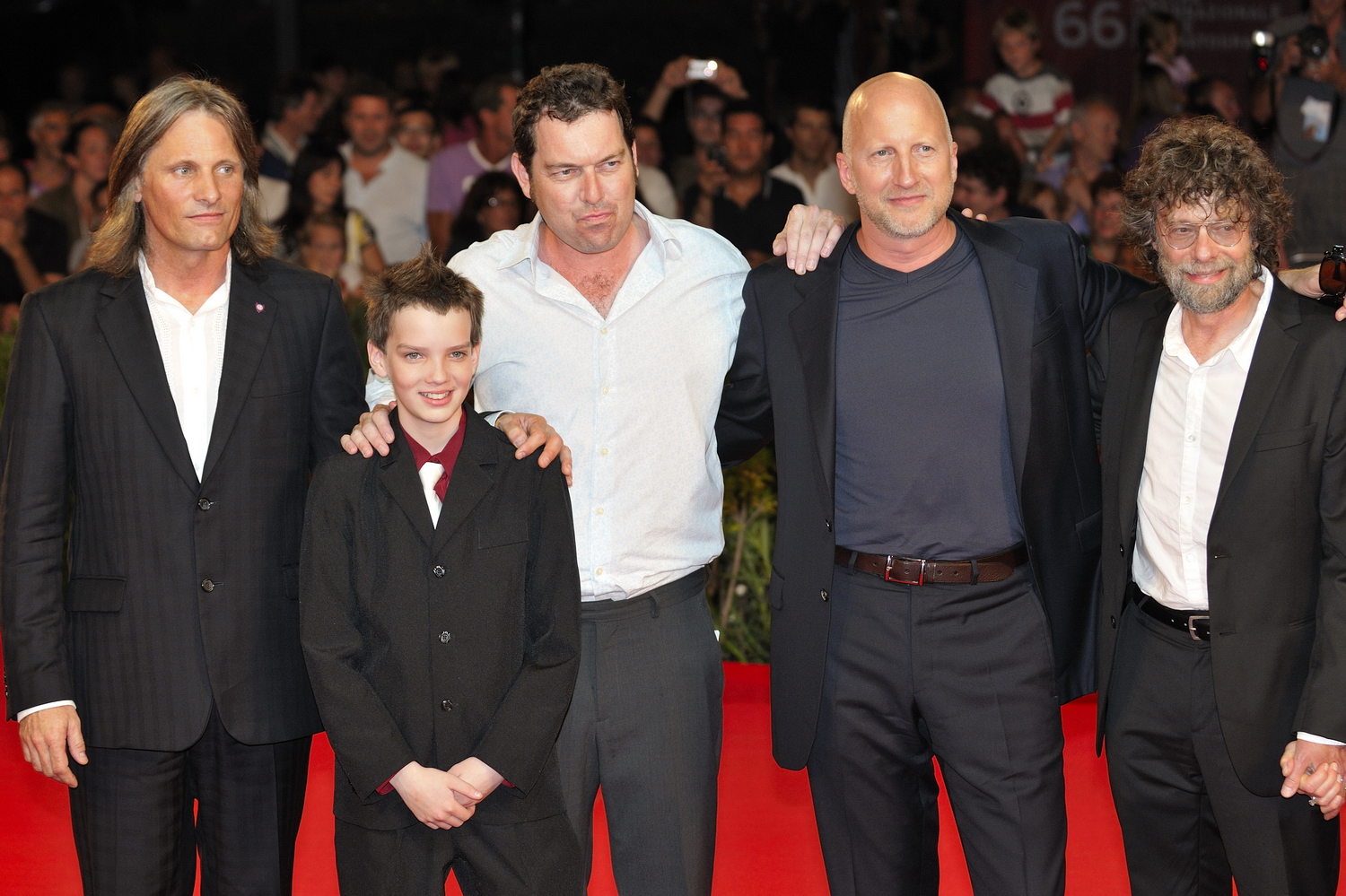
Actors Viggo Mortensen and Kodi Smit-McPhee, screenwriter Joe Penhall, director John Hillcoat and producer Steve Schwartz at the 66th Venice International Film Festival.

The Road was originally scheduled to be released in November 2008. It was pushed back to be released in December, and pushed back a second time to sometime in 2009. According to The Hollywood Reporter, the studio decided that the film would benefit from a longer post-production process and a less crowded release calendar. A new release date was scheduled for October 16, 2009. However, according to reports from Screen Rant and /Film, the Weinsteins had decided at the last minute to delay the film to November 25, 2009 as a possible move to make the film more of an Oscar contender, bumping their previous film set for that date, Rob Marshall's adaptation of the musical Nine (which was also predicted to be an awards contender) into December 2009.

The film had its world premiere in September 2009 at the 66th Venice International Film Festival where it was in competition for the Golden Lion and Silver Lion prizes. It also screened at the 34th Toronto International Film Festival.

== Reception ==
=== Critical response ===
The film holds a 74% approval rating on review aggregator Rotten Tomatoes based on 217 reviews; the average rating is 6.94/10. The critical consensus states, "The Road's commitment to Cormac McCarthy's dark vision may prove too unyielding for some, but the film benefits from hauntingly powerful performances from Viggo Mortensen and Kodi McPhee." It has a score of 64/100 on Metacritic based on 33 reviews, indicating generally positive reviews.

A. O. Scott from At the Movies stated that while the film "hits a few tinny, sentimental notes", he "admire[s] the craft and conviction of this film, and [he] was impressed enough by the look and the performances to recommend that you see it." Peter Travers from Rolling Stone calls the film a "haunting portrait of America as no country for old men or young". He states that "Hillcoat – through the artistry of Mortensen and Smit-McPhee – carries the fire of our shared humanity and lets it burn bright and true." Joe Morgenstern from the Wall Street Journal states that viewers have to "hang on to yourself for dear life, resisting belief as best you can in the face of powerful acting, persuasive filmmaking and the perversely compelling certainty that nothing will turn out all right."

Esquire screened the film before it was released and called it "the most important movie of the year" and "a brilliantly directed adaptation of a beloved novel, a delicate and anachronistically loving look at the immodest and brutish end of us all. You want them to get there, you want them to get there, you want them to get there—and yet you do not want it, any of it, to end." IGN gave it four and a half out of five stars, calling it "one of the most important and moving films to come along in a long time."

In an early review, The Guardian gave the film four stars out of five, describing it as "a haunting, harrowing, powerful film", with Mortensen "perfectly cast" as the Man. Roger Ebert awarded the film 3.5 out of 4 stars, praising Mortensen and Smit-McPhee's work, but said the film was not as powerful as the book. Luke Davies of The Monthly described the film as "gorgeous, in a horrible way, but its greater coolness and distance shows just how difficult it can be to translate to screen the innate psychic warmth of great literature," and suggested the film's flaws "might have to do with the directorial point of view—it all feels too detached, in a way that the book in its searing intimacy does not," concluding that the film has "too much tableau and not enough acting."

A review in Adbusters disapproved of the product placement in the film, but, as noted by Hillcoat, the references to Coca-Cola appear in the novel, and the company was in fact reluctant about the product being portrayed in the film. The Washington Post said the film "is one long dirge, a keening lamentation marking the death of hope and the leeching of all that is bright and good from the world...It possesses undeniable sweep and a grim kind of grandeur, but it ultimately plays like a zombie movie with literary pretensions." Tom Huddleston from Time Out called the film "as direct and unflinching an adaptation as one could reasonably hope for" and "certainly the bleakest and potentially the least commercial product in recent Hollywood history." He said the movie is a "resounding triumph", noting its "stunning landscape photography [which] sets the melancholy mood, and Nick Cave's wrenching score." Sam Adams from the Los Angeles Times noted that while "Hillcoat certainly provides the requisite seriousness, [...] the movie lacks... an underlying sense of innocence, a sense that, however far humanity has sunk, there is at least some chance of rising again." Kyle Smith from the New York Post stated that "Zombieland was the same movie with laughs, but if you take away the comedy, what is left? Nothing, on a vast scale." J. Hoberman from the Village Voice said that while "Cormac McCarthy's Pulitzer Prize-winning, Oprah-endorsed, post-apocalyptic survivalist prose poem...was a quick, lacerating read", "John Hillcoat's literal adaptation is, by contrast, a long, dull slog." Jake Coyle from the Associated Press stated that "[a]dapting a masterpiece such as The Road is a thankless task, but the film doesn't work on its own merits".

=== Accolades ===
Award	Date of ceremony	Category	Recipient	Result
Australian Film Institute	December 11, 2010	Best Actor (International Award)	Kodi Smit-McPhee	Nominated
British Academy Film Awards	February 21, 2010	Best Cinematography	Javier Aguirresarobe	Nominated
Critics' Choice Movie Awards	January 15, 2010	Best Actor	Viggo Mortensen	Nominated
Critics' Choice Movie Awards	January 15, 2010	Best Young Performer	Kodi Smit-McPhee	Nominated
Critics' Choice Movie Awards	January 15, 2010	Best Makeup		Nominated
Denver Film Critics Society	2009	Best Actor	Viggo Mortensen	Nominated
Houston Film Critics Society	December 17, 2009	Best Actor	Viggo Mortensen	Nominated
San Diego Film Critics Society	December 15, 2009	Best Actor	Viggo Mortensen	Nominated
San Diego Film Critics Society	December 15, 2009	Best Cinematography	Javier Aguirresarobe	Won
Satellite Awards	December 20, 2009	Best Art Direction and Production Design	Chris Kennedy	Nominated
Saturn Awards	June 24, 2010	Best Actor	Viggo Mortensen	Nominated
Saturn Awards	June 24, 2010	Best Performance by a Younger Actor	Kodi Smit-McPhee	Nominated
Scream Awards	October 19, 2010	Best Science Fiction Movie		Nominated
Scream Awards	October 19, 2010	Breakout Performance – Male	Kodi Smit-McPhee	Nominated
St. Louis Gateway Film Critics Association	December 21, 2009	Best Supporting Actor	Robert Duvall	Nominated
Toronto Film Critics Association	December 16, 2009	Best Actor	Viggo Mortensen	Nominated
Utah Film Critics Association	2009	Best Actor	Viggo Mortensen	Won
Venice International Film Festival	September 2–12, 2009	Golden Lion	John Hillcoat	Nominated
Visual Effects Society	February 10, 2010	Outstanding Supporting Visual Effects in a Feature Motion Picture	Mark O. Forker, Phillip Moses, Ed Mendez, Paul Graff	Nominated
Washington D.C. Area Film Critics Association	December 7, 2009	Best Actor	Viggo Mortensen	Nominated
Washington D.C. Area Film Critics Association	December 7, 2009	Best Adapted Screenplay	Joe Penhall	Nominated

== Home media ==
The DVD and Blu-ray versions were released on May 17, 2010 in the United Kingdom, and on May 25, 2010 in the United States by Sony Pictures Home Entertainment.

== See also ==
- Cannibalism in popular culture
- Societal collapse
- Survival film, about the film genre, with a list of related films
