= Brimstone Peak =

Brimstone Peak may refer to:

- Brimstone Peak (South Shetland Islands)
- Brimstone Peak (Victoria Land)
