= Say That to Say This =

Studio album by Trombone Shorty
- Released: 2013
- Genre: Jazz
- Length: 35:25
- Label: Verve
- Producer: Trombone Shorty, Raphael Saadiq

Trombone Shorty chronology
For True (2011)	Say That to Say This (2013)	Parking Lot Symphony (2017)

Say That to Say This is an album by Troy 'Trombone Shorty' Andrews. It was his third album for Verve Records, and was co-produced by Raphael Saadiq. The AllMusic reviewer concluded: "with all of its confidence, production polish, and sophistication, this is the album that should break Trombone Shorty to a much wider, more diverse audience."

== Track listing ==
No.	Title	Length
1.	"Say That to Say This"	2:56
2.	"You and I (Outta This Place)"	3:51
3.	"Get the Picture"	2:44
4.	"Vieux Carre"	2:46
5.	"Be My Lady"	3:32
6.	"Long Weekend"	4:08
7.	"Fire and Brimstone"	3:28
8.	"Sunrise"	3:16
9.	"Dream On"	4:21
10.	"Shortyville"	4:23
Total length:		35:25

== Personnel ==
- Troy 'Trombone Shorty' Andrews - Trombone, Lead Vocals
- Pete Murano - Guitar
- Michael Ballard - Bass Guitar
- Joey Peebles - Drums
- Dan Oestreicher - Baritone Saxophone
- BK Jackson - Tenor Saxophone
