= Rumble (instrumental) =

1958 instrumental by Link Wray

Single by Link Wray & His Ray Men
- B-side: "The Swag"
- Released: March 31, 1958
- Genre: Rock and roll; instrumental rock; surf rock; garage rock
- Length: 2:25
- Label: Cadence
- Songwriters: Milton Grant; Link Wray

Official audio
- "Rumble" on YouTube

"Rumble" is an instrumental by American group Link Wray & His Ray Men. Released as a single in the United States on March 31, 1958, "Rumble" utilized the techniques of guitar distortion, power chords, and tremolo, then largely unexplored in rock and roll.

In 2008, it was inducted to National Recording Registry by Library of Congress. In 2018, the piece was inducted into the Rock and Roll Hall of Fame in a new category for singles.

== History ==
At a live gig in Fredericksburg, Virginia, in early 1958, while attempting to work up a backing for the Diamonds' "The Stroll", Link Wray & His Ray Men came up with the instrumental "Rumble", which they originally called "Oddball". It was an instant hit with the audience, which demanded four repeats that night. The host of the sock hop, disc jockey Milt Grant, paid for the track to be recorded in Washington, D.C., and released as a single; in turn, Grant would receive songwriting credit.

Eventually the instrumental came to the attention of record producer Archie Bleyer of Cadence Records, who hated it, particularly after Wray poked a pencil through the speaker cone of his amplifier to make the recording sound more like the live version. But Bleyer's stepdaughter loved it, so he released it despite his misgivings.

Phil Everly suggested the title "Rumble", as its rough sound conjured images of a street fight. In an era of increasing fears over juvenile delinquency, some radio stations opted not to play the record due to the title's implication of gang violence.

== Reception ==
"Rumble" was a hit in the United States, where it climbed to number 16 on the pop charts and number 11 on the R&B chart in the summer of 1958. In Canada the record also reached number 16.

Shortly after the record's release, The Morning-Advocate of Baton Rouge, Louisiana, wrote: "Rumble is teen slanguage for a street brawl...Ploddingly slow, this tune is much like 'Big Guitar' in feeling. Wray's Ray Men produce some weird sounds. This is blues, 1958." The Press-Telegram of Long Beach, California, published a positive review, commenting on its menacing nature: "In line with its title, the tune features a rather sinister-sounding rock 'n' roll tempo evoking all sorts of frightful pictures of tattooed teenagers in leather jackets." Rolling Stone, writing retrospectively, said "its ragged, ominous chords, overdriven and dragged to a crawl, sounded like an invitation to a knife fight."

== Legacy ==
Wray is often credited with introducing the power chord to popular music with "Rumble". Pete Townshend of the Who, whose playing features power chords prominently, said of Wray: "He is the king. If it hadn't been for Link Wray and 'Rumble,' I would have never picked up a guitar."

Bob Dylan, who had seen Wray in concert at age sixteen, called "Rumble" the "best instrumental ever," and has performed it on occasion with his own band. Iggy Pop said that he "left school emotionally" when he heard "Rumble", leading him to pursue a career in music.

In the 2008 documentary It Might Get Loud, Jimmy Page of Led Zeppelin plays "Rumble" on his turntable, praising its "profound attitude." Page performed it live at Wray's 2023 induction ceremony at the Rock and Roll Hall of Fame.
