= Link Wray (album) =

Studio album by Link Wray
- Released: June 1971
- Recorded: 1971
- Studio: Wray's Shack Three Track, Accokeek, Maryland
- Genre: Country; blues; folk rock; swamp rock
- Length: 44:16
- Label: Polydor
- Producer: Steve Verroca; Ray Vernon; Bob Feldman

Link Wray chronology
| Listen to the Voices That Want to Be Free (1970) | Link Wray (1971) | Mordicai Jones (1971) |

Link Wray is the 1971 album by pioneering guitarist Link Wray. The music is an Americana blend of blues, country, gospel, and folk rock elements. This music is characterized by the purposeful use of simplified sounds to reflect the then-current vogue of blues and other roots music being used in many roots rock bands. Wray's guitar-work, composing, and vocals reflected modern rock influences. Despite publicity from radio stations and print media in the Washington, D.C. area, the album did not do well in national sales.

Some tracks from this album later surfaced on the compilation Guitar Preacher: The Polydor Years, and it was included in its entirety on 2CDs compilation Wray's Three Track Shack (Acadia/Evangeline Recorded Works Ltd./Universal Music, 2005) along with other "shack" recordings of '71 Beans and Fatback and Mordicai Jones. The album has proved influential in later decades, with The Neville Brothers, Calexico, Karl Blau, and Father John Misty, among others, recording covers of tracks from it.

== Recording ==
The album was recorded in 1971 by Link's brother Vernon "Ray Vernon" Wray at "Wray's Shack Three Track", a three track studio Link Wray had converted from an old chicken shack on his farm in Accokeek, Maryland, and mixed by Chuck Irwin. During louder numbers, the recording team placed the speakers for Link Wray's guitar outside in the yard and miked the windows. For a time no drum kit was available, so on several tracks the musicians stomped on the floor for the bass drum and shook a can of nails for the snare drum.

Songwriter/co-producer/drummer Steve Verroca said that, "What we do is go into the shack and make music. We get the melody that way and then maybe write down some lyrics. Okay, it's a little unusual but that is what comes natural."

== Reception ==
Professional ratings
Review scores
| Source | Rating |
|---|---|
| AllMusic | 4/5 stars |
| Christgau's Record Guide | C+ |
| Pitchfork | (9.1/10) |

Because of the change in style from his earlier work, the album was poorly received by Link Wray's fan base. Wray had anticipated this, and shortly before the album's release remarked, "In a way I couldn't care less if the album didn't sell a single copy. We're happy with it and we've done it our way."

In their retrospective review, Allmusic criticized that the album as a whole "lacks the switchblade intensity of Wray's most famous music." However, they praised the album's passion and honesty, claimed that it had aged better than most country rock of the era, and commented that "the best songs speak eloquently of the hard facts of Wray's early life as a poor Shawnee child in the Deep South, and there's a humble back-porch stomp in this music that's heartfelt and immediate."

== Track listing ==
1. "La De Da" (Steve Verroca) - 4:04
2. "Take Me Home Jesus" (Verroca) - 3:21
3. "Juke Box Mama" (Verroca) - 4:29
4. "Rise and Fall of Jimmy Stokes" (Verroca) - 4:02
5. "Fallin' Rain" (Link Wray) - 3:44
6. "Fire and Brimstone" (Wray) - 4:21
7. "Ice People" (Wray) - 3:03
8. "God Out West" (Verroca) - 3:54
9. "Crowbar" (Wray) - 4:48
10. "Black River Swamp" (Wray) - 3:58
11. "Tail Dragger" (Willie Dixon) - 4:32

== Personnel ==
=== The Family ===
- Link Wray - lead vocals, guitars, Dobro, bass guitar
- Bobby Howard - mandolin, piano
- Bill Hodges - piano, organ, backing vocals
- Doug Wray - drums, percussion, backing vocals
- Steve Verroca - drums, percussion, backing vocals
- Gene Johnson - backing vocals

== Production ==
- Producer: Steve Verroca and Ray Vernon, in association with Bob Feldman
- Recording Engineer: Ray Vernon
- Remixing Engineer: Chuck Irwin

== Legacy ==
The Neville Brothers later covered "Fire and Brimstone" on their album Yellow Moon, as did Nick Cave and Ralph Stanley for the soundtrack of the film Lawless.

The band Calexico covered "Fallin' Rain" as bonus track on their album Feast of Wire. Karl Blau covered "Fallin' Rain" on his 2016 covers album Introducing Karl Blau. The Neville Brothers also covered "Fallin' Rain" on their album Brother's Keeper. In 2020, Father John Misty covered "Fallin' Rain" on his EP "Anthem +3".

Charley Crockett began performing a cover "Juke Box Mama" in all of his live performances starting on September 18, 2023 at the Metropol while on tour in Berlin, Germany. He would also release a cover of "Fire and Brimstone" as an Amazon Music exclusive on October 27, 2023 coinciding with Wray's induction to the Rock and Roll Hall of Fame.
