= Derrick Tabb =

American musician from New Orleans

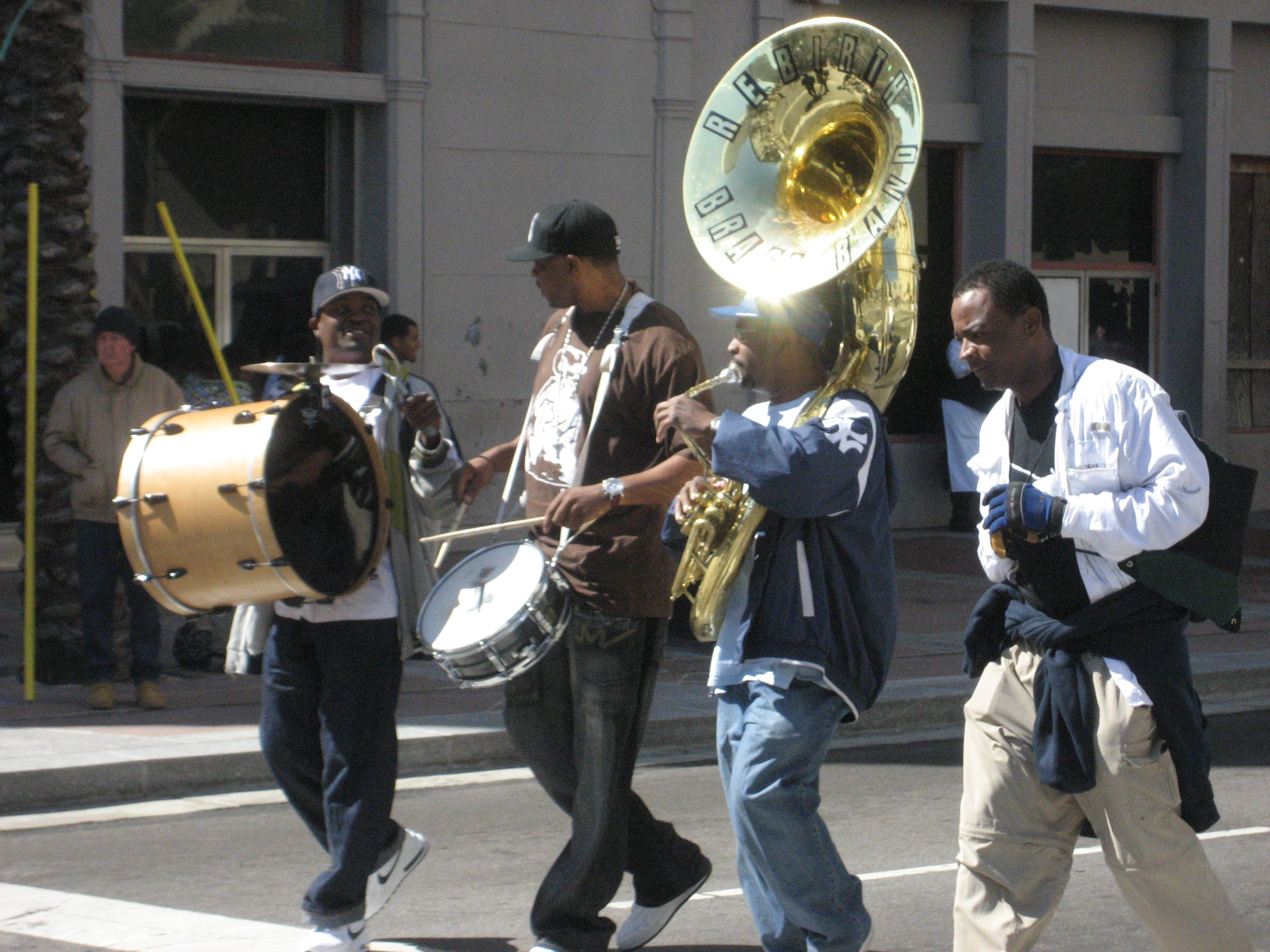
- Tabb (on snare drum) in a second-line parade in New Orleans (2007)

Background information
- Born: May 27, 1975 (age 51); New Orleans, Louisiana, U.S.
- Occupations: Musician, educator
- Instrument: Drum
- Formerly of: Hot 8 Brass Band, Rebirth Brass Band

Derrick Tabb (born May 27, 1975) is an American musician, a long-standing member of the Rebirth Brass Band and a co-founder of The Roots of Music, a non-profit organization that sponsors an after-school academic and music program for children in New Orleans. For onstage performances, Tabb plays the snare drum with cymbals mounted on stands. He was born and raised in the Tremé neighborhood of New Orleans.

== Early life ==
Tabb was born in the Tremé neighborhood of New Orleans, Louisiana, an area historically known as "The Birthplace of Jazz". He began playing drums at the age of 7 and was earning a living as a professional drummer by the age of 11. Tabb attended Andrew J. Bell Middle School, where he joined the band and credits his middle school band director, Donald Richardson, for personal and professional success.

== Career ==
In 1994, Tabb and some friends formed Loony Tunes Brass Band, later renamed Hot 8 Brass Band. The band kept the name when Tabb left in 1996 to join Rebirth Brass Band and Dinerral Shavers replaced Tabb as the snare drummer for Hot 8. Shavers was murdered in New Orleans in 2006, a victim of mistaken identity.

As a member of Rebirth Brass Band, Tabb won a Grammy in 2012 in the Best Regional Roots Music Album category, for the studio recording Rebirth of New Orleans.

=== The Roots of Music ===
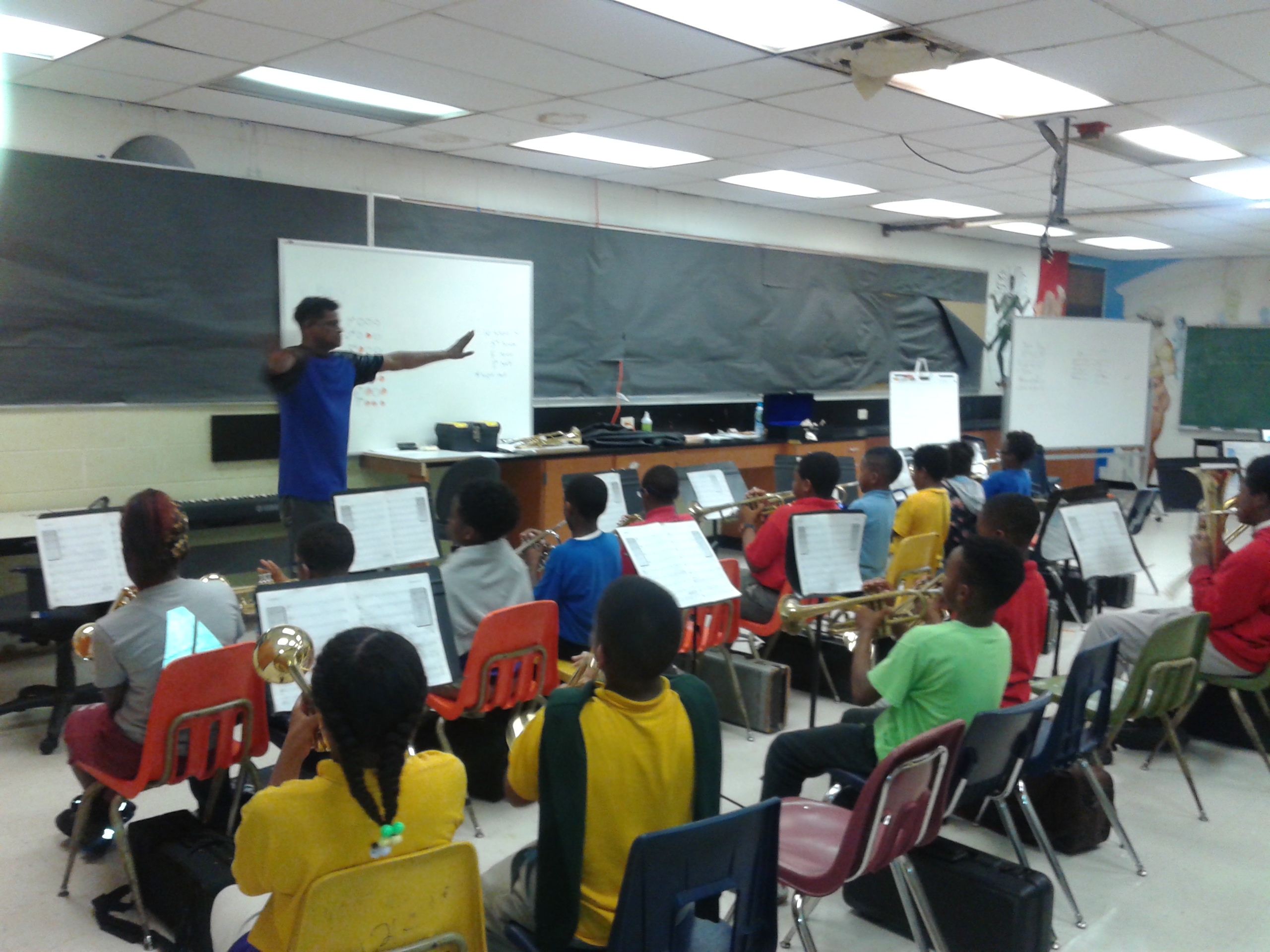
Roots of Music instructor Arden Jones directing a part of the brass section during practice in 2015

In 2007, Tabb co-founded The Roots of Music, a non-profit after-school program for at-risk children ages 9–14 in New Orleans schools. The Roots of Music serves 140 students each year and has a waiting list of approximately 400 students.

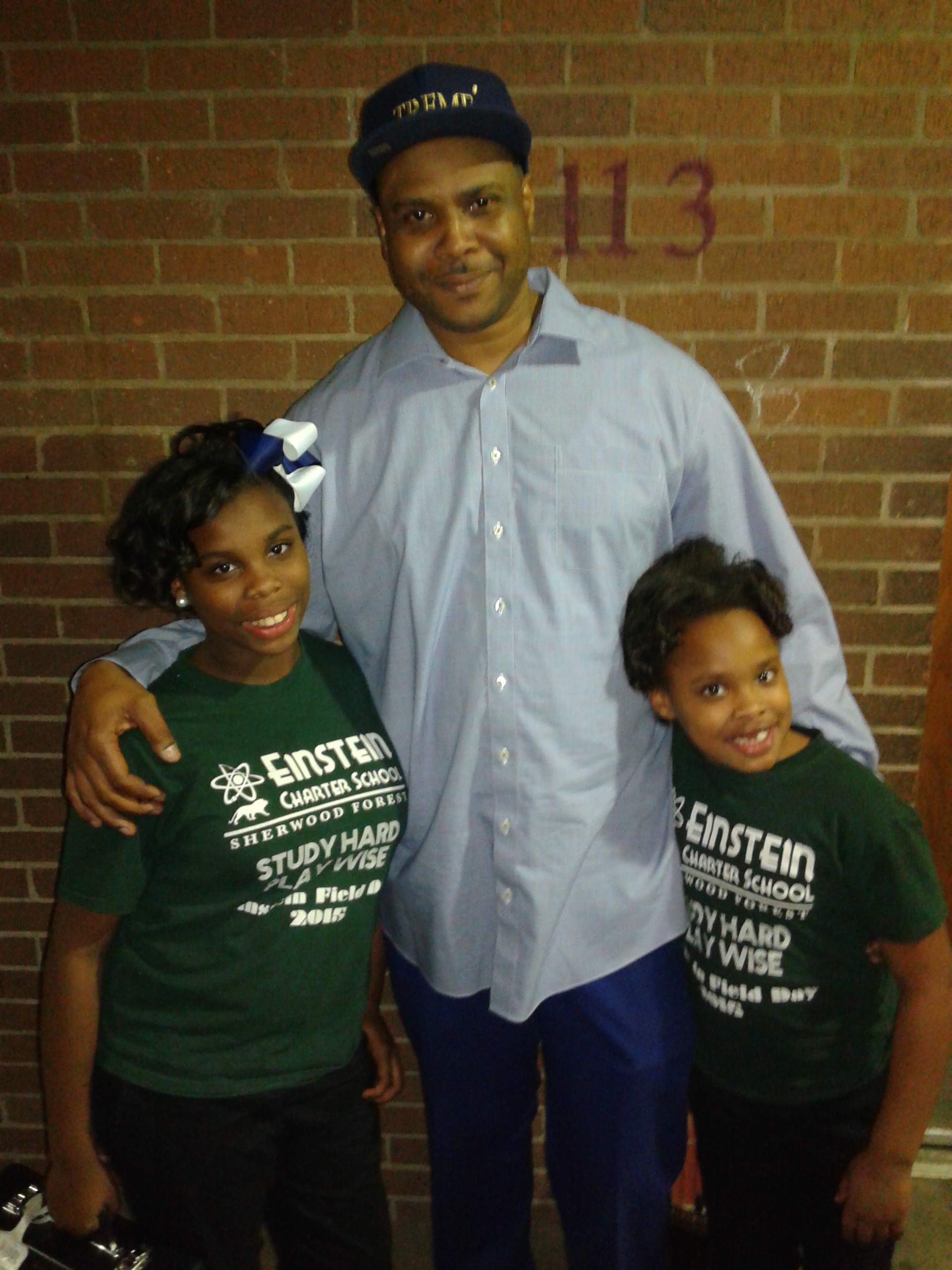
Roots of Music co-founder Tabb, with two Roots band members in 2015

In the aftermath of Hurricane Katrina, area school districts reduced funding to music programs, specifically middle schools. Rebirth Brass Band member Tabb and Allison Reinhardt co-founded The Roots of Music, a non-profit after-school program for Orleans Parish at-risk children ages 9–14. The students are mentored in music by local New Orleans music educators and professional musicians. Academic mentoring and tutoring is provided by volunteers and graduate students from Tulane and Xavier universities. Tabb stated that his goal in starting Roots was "to do for a new generation of kids what his own middle school band did for him."

Monday through Thursday, the organization's school buses pick up students from 40 Orleans Parish middle schools and transports them to its facility in the Tremé neighborhood in New Orleans. For the first hour and a half, the students receive homework assistance and academic tutoring by volunteers. After homework, the students receive music instruction and field practice. Before the students are transported home via school bus after practice, the students receive a hot meal. The program is entirely free for the students and relies wholly on private and corporate donations and volunteers to cover operating expenses.

The Roots of Music Crusader Band and Tabb have received numerous meritorious awards for academic achievement as well as musical accolades. Tabb was a top finalist of the CNN Heroes Award in 2009, he was also the recipient of the Blue Cross Blue Shield Angel Award (2011), and was a finalist for induction into the Energizer Keep It Going Hall of Fame (2010). Tabb has also received proclamations from the City of New Orleans (2009 and 2012) and the State of Louisiana (2011) for his work with kids.

In 2013, the band participated in the Tournament of Roses Parade in Pasadena, California and was acclaimed for having the youngest participant in the parade's long history, 6 year-old Lawrence Honoré Jr.

On August 29, 2015, President Barack Obama visited New Orleans to remark on the 10-year mark of Hurricane Katrina. A small ensemble of The Roots of Music performed prior to his speaking and the band was complimented by the president during his speech.

=== "The Treme Two" ===
On October 1, 2007, Tabb and his brother, trombonist Glen David Andrews, were arrested for "parading without a permit" and "disturbing the peace by tumultuous manner" in the Tremé neighborhood of New Orleans during a gathering honoring fellow musician, Kerwin James. James, the younger brother of Rebirth founders, Phil and Keith Frazier, had died following complications from a stroke in 2006. A crowd of musicians and spectators had gathered to honor James in music and song that night. Police officers, after asking the crowd the disperse and being refused, arrested Tabb and Andrews. This incident, witnessed by resident news journalists, stirred the small community and sparked outcry against the police department, as street parades are inherent to the history and culture of New Orleans. The community, viewing the pair of brothers as advocates for their voice in the city, dubbed the pair with the nickname, "The Tremé Two". After several weeks of unrest and protest by neighborhood residents to the New Orleans Police Department and city council, in February 2008, the District Attorney dropped the charges without comment. A fictional adaption of the incident featuring Tabb and Andrews as themselves was incorporated into an episode of the HBO television series, Treme (season 3, episode 1, "Knock with Me, Rock with Me").

== Discography ==
Tabb is credited as the snare drummer on all studio and live recordings billed as "Rebirth Brass Band" since 1997. (see Rebirth Brass Band - Discography for complete listing of all Rebirth recordings)

Additionally, Tabb appears (by himself) as a guest artist on the title track of the 2012 studio album ¿Which Side Are You On? by Ani DiFranco, along with his Roots of Music Crusader Band. He is also credited as a featured artist on the 2010 movie soundtrack For Colored Girls.

Tabb also acted as songwriter/composer on the Rebirth tracks:

- "Do It Again" from the Grammy Award-winning album Rebirth of New Orleans (2012)
- "Move Your Body" from the album Move Your Body (2014)
- "Rebirth Groove" from the album Move Your Body (2014)
- "Why You Worried Bout Me" (single) (2011) (featured in season 1, episode 10 of The Originals)

== Filmography ==
=== Television ===
- The 3rd Annual CNN Heroes: An All-Star Tribute (2009)
- CNN's Larry King Live (August 21, 2009)
- HBO'S Treme (2010-2013)
  - Season 1, episode 1 "Do You Know What it Means" - Tabb can be seen playing the snare drum in a second line parade
  - Season 3, episode 1 "Knock with Me, Roll with Me" - Tabb plays himself, along with his real-life brother and former Rebirth Brass Band member, Glen David Andrews. The pair is arrested for disturbing the peace for playing music at a street memorial in the musically historical neighborhood of Tremé. This episode is a fictional account of a real-life incident in 2007 in which the community dubbed the pair "The Tremé Two".
  - Series finale, season 4, episode 5 "...To Miss New Orleans"
- 48 Hours Presents: The Whole Gritty City (2014). This episode of 48 Hours won a Christopher Award in the category "TV and Cable".

=== Films ===
- The Skeleton Key (2005), as a member of the Rebirth Brass Band
- The Whole Gritty City documentary (2013), as himself, preparing The Roots of Music Crusader Band for Mardi Gras parade season in New Orleans

== Awards and honors ==
- 2009 - CNN Heroes (Top Finalist)
- 2009 - City of New Orleans Proclamation (Recipient)
- 2010 - Energizer Keep It Going Hall of Fame Nominee (finalist)
- 2011 - Blue Cross Blue Shield Angel Award (Recipient)
- 2011 - Young Leadership Council Role Model Award (Recipient)
- 2011 - OffBeat Magazine - Best of the Beat Award for Music Education (Recipient)
- 2012 - (with Rebirth Brass Band) Grammy Award for Best Regional Roots Music Album
- 2012 - City of New Orleans Proclamation (Recipient)
- 2015 - Millennial Award - Cultural Ambassador (finalist)
- 2015 - Katrina First Cultural Responder (Honoree)
- 2015 - Louisiana Children's Museum Silver Linings Award (Honoree) for "making a lasting and positive impact on the lives of young children in the community following Hurricane Katrina".

== See also ==
- Rebirth Brass Band
- The Roots of Music
- Tremé (neighborhood in New Orleans)
- HBO's Treme TV show
