= Rebirth Brass Band =

American brass band from New Orleans, Louisiana

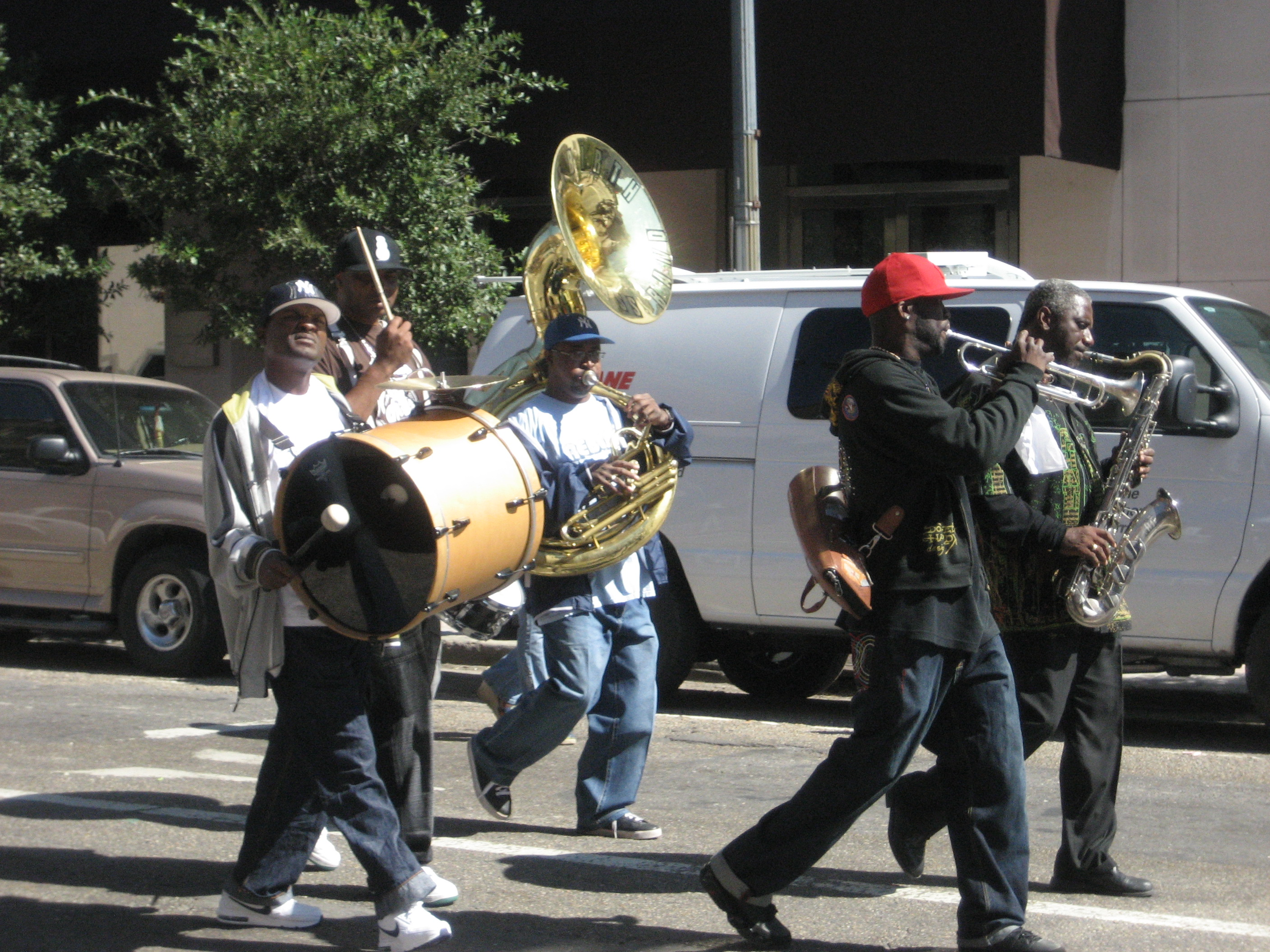
- Three members of the Rebirth Brass Band and other musicians play for a second-line parade in the Central Business District of New Orleans in 2007.

Background information
- Origin: Treme, New Orleans, Louisiana
- Genres: Jazz, funk
- Years active: 1983–present
- Labels: Arhoolie, Basin Street, Rounder
- Members: Stafford Agee; Jenard Andrews; Terrence Andrews; Vincent Broussard; Keith Frazier; Phillip Frazier; Eric Gordon; Glenn Hall III; Chadrick Honoré; Clifton Smith; Caleb Windsley
- Past members: Shamar Allen; Glen Andrews; Revert Andrews; Kenny Austin; Byron Bernard; Tyrus Chapman; Solomon Doyle; John Gilbert; Corey Henry; A. J. Mallery; Roderick Paulin; Kermit Ruffins; Derrick Shezbie; Gregory Veals; Derrick Tabb; Kenny Terry
- Website: rebirthbrassband.com

The Rebirth Brass Band is a New Orleans brass band. The group was founded in 1983 by Phillip "Tuba Phil" Frazier, his brother Keith Frazier, Kermit Ruffins, and classmates from Joseph S. Clark Senior High School, which closed in the spring of 2018, in the Tremé neighborhood of New Orleans. Arhoolie released its first album in 1984.

In 2012, Rebirth won the Grammy Award for Best Regional Roots Music Album, the inaugural year of the Grammy category. The band also performed in the pre-telecast ceremony for the 54th Annual Grammy Awards.

== Background ==
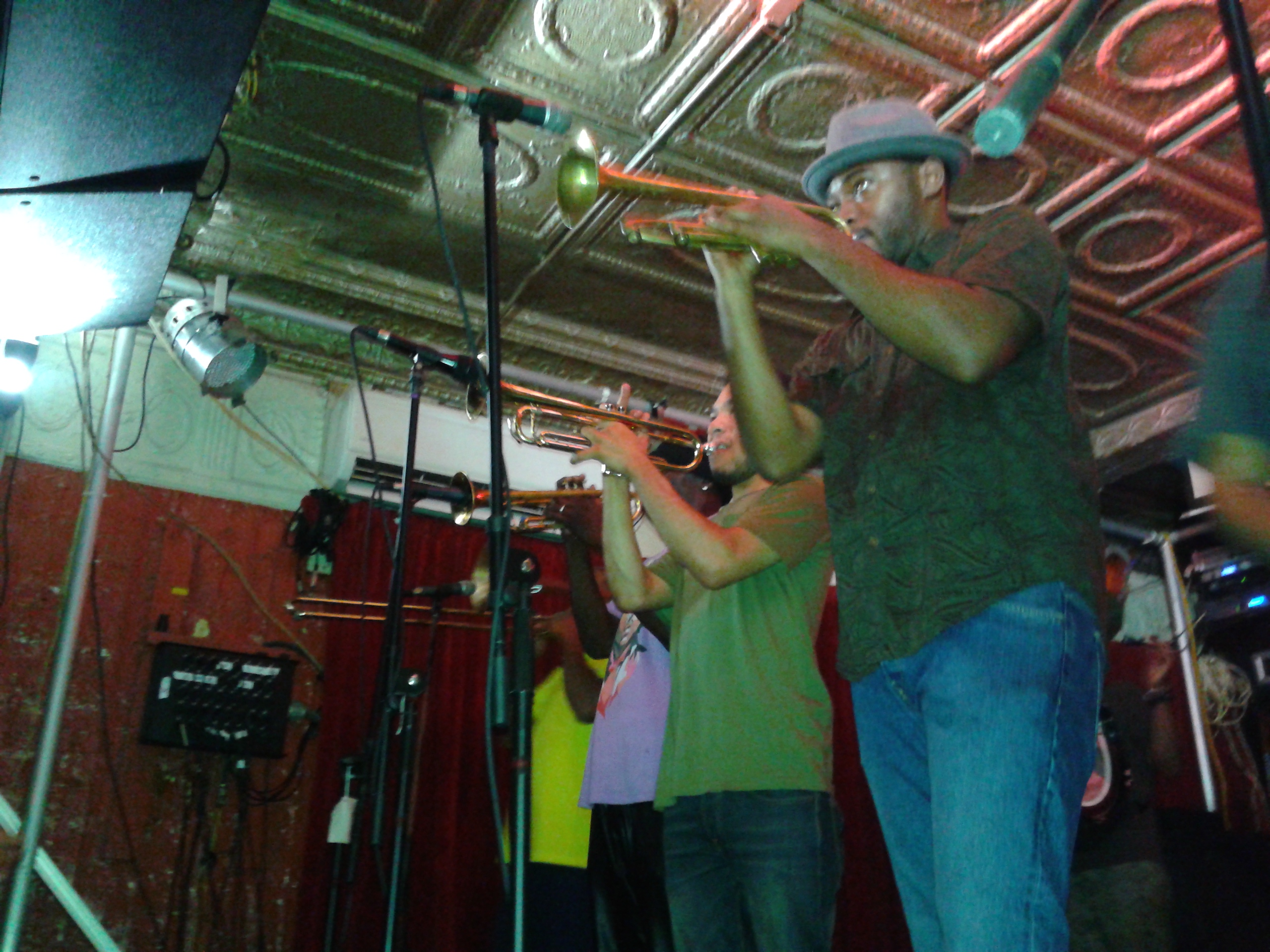
Rebirth Brass Band at the Maple Leaf, December 15, 2015

Rebirth Brass Band is known for combining traditional New Orleans brass band music, including the New Orleans tradition of second line, with funk, jazz, soul and hip hop. In 1993, trumpeter Kermit Ruffins and Rebirth split amicably after Ruffins decided to spend more time at home with his young family and forego Rebirth touring engagements. For a time, he accompanied Rebirth at their local events, until he formed his own band, the Barbecue Swingers.

Rebirth's longstanding regular Tuesday night gig at the Maple Leaf Bar on Oak Street in the Carrollton neighborhood of Uptown New Orleans is one of the pillars of the New Orleans music scene, and has served as a reliable introduction to the city's nightlife for many new arrivals to the city. During his speech commemorating the 10th year since Hurricane Katrina, President Barack Obama jokingly mentioned that maybe he will "finally hear Rebirth at Maple Leaf on Tuesday night" after he is out of office.

The band regularly tours North America and Europe. In 2011, Basin Street Records released the album Rebirth of New Orleans, which reached No. 1 on the CMJ Jazz charts and earned the group a 2012 Grammy Award for Best Regional Roots Music Album. Former member Corey Henry left in 2011 to form his band The Treme Funktet. In 2015, Rebirth received an award for "Best Brass Band" from OffBeat magazine.

By the middle of 2019, founding members Phillip "Tuba Phil" Frazier and Derrick Tabb were no longer playing regularly with the band. At the 2020 Grammy Awards, the band's album Recorded Live At The 2019 New Orleans Jazz & Heritage Festival was nominated for Best Regional Roots Music Album.

== Family ties ==
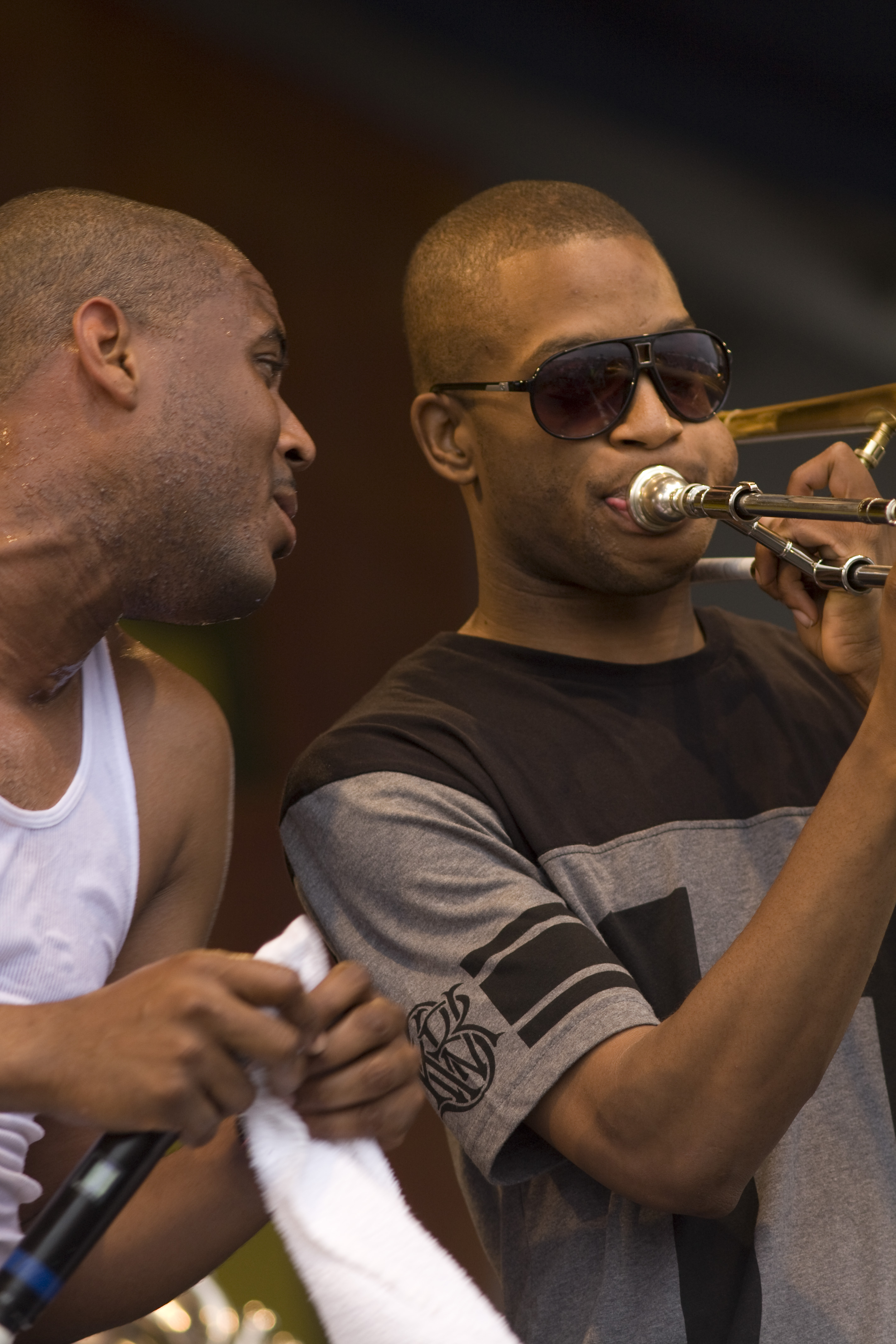
Glen David and Troy Andrews at JazzFest 2010

Several of the current and former members of Rebirth Brass Band are related by blood or marriage. Founding members Phillip "Tuba Phil" Frazier and Keith Frazier are brothers. New Orleans rapper James "Soulja Slim" Tapp, Jr. (also known as "Magnolia Slim") was Phillip Frazier's stepson. Former Rebirth member, trombonist Glen David Andrews (not to be confused with his cousin, trumpeter Glen Andrews) and Rebirth snare drummer Derrick Tabb are also brothers. Glen David, Glen, trombonist Revert "Peanut" Andrews and trombonist Troy "Trombone Shorty" Andrews are cousins, part of the Andrews family of jazz musicians. Trombone Shorty and his brother, James Andrews, are grandsons of Jessie Hill, an R&B/jazz singer who had the hit song "Ooh Poo Pah Doo" in 1960. Several cousins of Andrews and Tabb play in other New Orleans–based brass bands including Kinfolk Brass Band, New Breed Brass Band, Hot 8 Brass Band, Dirty Dozen Brass Band and several nephews of Andrews and Tabb perform in Baby Boyz Brass Band. Glenn Hall, current trumpet player for Rebirth and also a member of the Andrews clan, was the former band leader of Baby Boyz. Travis "Trumpet Black" Hill, another grandson of Jessie Hill, was a rising member of the New Orleans jazz community until his untimely death from an infection while on tour in Japan on May 5, 2015.

== Rebirth Pale Ale ==
In 2014, NOLA Brewing Company launched the "Rebirth Pale Ale" on tap, paying tribute to the legacy of the Rebirth Brass Band. The company launched the brew in six-pack cans in July 2014. The can's design features Rebirth founder and tuba player, Phil Frazier. The artwork was drawn by New Orleans local artist, Frenchy. Proceeds from the beverage benefit The Roots of Music, a non-profit music education program for children in New Orleans founded by Rebirth drummer, Derrick Tabb. The tap handle is designed to mimic the tuba used by Rebirth member, Phil Frazier. On December 1, 2015, NOLA Brewing Company presented a check to The Roots of Music in the amount of $75,000, representing the proceeds from the sale of the beverage since its launch in April 2014.

== The Roots of Music ==
In 2007, Rebirth snare drummer, Derrick Tabb and his friend Allison Reinhardt co-founded The Roots of Music, a non-profit organization sponsoring an after-school program for at-risk children ages 9–14 attending school in Orleans Parish. The students are mentored by members of Rebirth Brass Band and other local New Orleans musicians and educators.

Tabb and The Roots of Music have received numerous meritorious awards for academic achievement as well as musical accolades. Tabb was a top finalist of the CNN Heroes Award in 2009. He was also the recipient of the Blue Cross Blue Shield Angel Award (2011), and was a finalist for induction into the Energizer Keep It Going Hall of Fame (2010). Tabb has also received proclamations from the City of New Orleans (2009, 2012) and the State of Louisiana (2011) for his work with kids.

In 2013, The Roots of Music participated in the Tournament of Roses Parade in Pasadena, California as the youngest invitees from outside California in the parade's long history. On August 29, 2015, President Barack Obama visited New Orleans to remark on the 10-year mark of Hurricane Katrina. A small ensemble of The Roots of Music performed prior to his speaking and the Roots of Music after-school program was complimented by the president during his speech.

== The Tremé Two ==
On October 1, 2007, a large group of local musicians gathered in Tremé near the corner of St. Phillip and N. Robertson streets, to sing and play music in honor of recently deceased fellow New Orleans musician, Kerwin James, younger brother of Rebirth Brass Band founders Phil and Keith Frazier. James had died following complications from a stroke he suffered in 2006. In the course of the gathering, witnesses state that approximately 20 police cars surrounded the musicians "in response to a noise complaint." A debate with the officers ensued regarding the time-honored tradition of "bringing down" (a gathering of musicians from around the city, playing music in the streets near the home or venue of a deceased musician in the days before the funeral or burial of the deceased). After a heated verbal exchange with the police officers responding to the scene, Rebirth drummer, Derrick Tabb and his brother, former Rebirth member Glen David Andrews, were both arrested and charged with "parading without a permit" and "disturbing the peace by tumultuous manner."

Ellis Joseph of the Free Agents Brass Band was one of the musicians gathered on that night and witnessed the incident. He commented on the police reaction to the crowd of musicians, stating, "...they (the New Orleans police officers) came in a swarm, like we had AK-47s. But we only had instruments." The pair was represented in court by Carol Kolinchak, a lawyer who also represented one of the defendants in the Jena 6 case.

The arrest was also witnessed by several local journalists who published scathing editorials the following morning in their respective media outlets. That arrest, combined with escalating police brutality in post-Katrina New Orleans, caused public outcry across the globe. Local residents criticized the handling of the Tabb and Andrews as an example of the treatment of native New Orleanians in regular clashes with New Orleans police patrols. Newspaper, radio, Internet, magazine and television outlets across the country reported on the incident.

Neighborhood citizens dubbed the brothers "The Tremé Two", lauding them as unwitting heroes and advocates for their community and their voice with the city and the police department. There was also public outcry on what was deemed as an attack on the city's culture by an influx of new post-Katrina residents in the neighborhood plus furor over the escalation of permitting fees for parading in certain areas of New Orleans, while fees in tourist areas remained nominal.

A fictionalized adaptation of the street memorial and the arrests of Tabb and Andrews is featured in Season 3, Episode 1, Knock with Me... Rock with Me... of the HBO's Treme TV show.

The Sunday following the arrests, New Orleans City Councilman James Carter held a neighborhood meeting to address the area citizens' concerns for the rise on what they viewed as an attack on the history and culture of Tremé. At the end of the meeting, Carter announced a plan to organize a task force to develop new city ordinances to protect the cultural heritage of the residents in Tremé. At the arraignment of Tabb and Andrews in New Orleans on October 4, 2007, they both entered an innocent plea on the charges of "parading without a permit" and "disturbing the peace by tumultuous manner." The city attorney dismissed the charges on February 20, 2008, with no comment.

In a press conference, Derrick Tabb expressed that although he was angry about the incident, he chose to use that frustration to develop an organization to help children in the city learn to play music and by using that energy to build and expand The Roots of Music, a non-profit after school program for at-risk middle school children ages 9 through 14 in Orleans Parish.

== Television and movie appearances ==
=== The HBO TV Series Treme ===
The Rebirth Brass Band and its members appear in several episodes of the HBO series Tremé. Some of the members also served as consultants on the series. The band's music is featured as live performances, recorded music in background and in the score. Additionally, the trumpet playing by Tremé character Delmond Lambreau is covered by Rebirth trumpeter Chadrick Honoré and the trombone playing by Antoine Batiste is covered by Rebirth trombonist Stafford Agee. Agee also appears in several scenes involving the Mardi Gras Indians.

The character Antoine Batiste, played by native New Orleanian Wendell Pierce, is loosely based on the real-life personas of former Rebirth Brass Band member Kermit Ruffins and Rebirth trombonist Stafford Agee. A subplot in the series involving the character's frustrations with music education funding and insurance is heavily grounded in the real-life development of The Roots of Music, a non-profit music education organization founded by Rebirth drummer, Derrick Tabb.

In Season 3, Episode 1 of Treme, "Knock With Me, Rock With Me", former Rebirth member Glen David Andrews and his real-life brother, Rebirth member, Derrick Tabb play fictionalized versions of themselves depicting events surrounding the brothers' actual arrests on October 1, 2007 in New Orleans for "parading without a permit" and "disturbing the peace by tumultuous manner" during a street memorial for fallen musician Kerwin James, the younger brother of Rebirth founding members, Phil and Keith Frazier. The real-life incident drew scathing criticism of the New Orleans Police Department's handling of the neighborhood tradition.

In the series finale of Treme, character Antoine Batiste, played by Wendell Pierce, pleads with Derrick Tabb (as himself) to absorb the character's failed after-school music program into Tabb's Roots of Music program for children of the same age.

=== Other television ===
The band appears in the opening scene of CBS's NCIS: New Orleans, Season 1, Episode 2 (2014) – "Carrier" (onstage at live music venue playing "HBNS" from the album Move Your Body).

The Rebirth tracks "Why You Worried Bout Me" and "What Goes Around Comes Around" are played in the background of Season 1, Episode 10, "Casket Girls", of the television show The Originals. Season 2, Episode 4, "Live and Let Die" features the songs "Rebirth Groove" and "Rebirth Makes You Dance".

=== Movie credits ===
- The Whole Gritty City (2013) is a documentary featuring Rebirth drummer Derrick Tabb as he prepares The Roots of Music Crusader Band for performance in Mardi Gras parades in post-Katrina New Orleans.
- Skeleton Key (2005)

=== Book mentions ===
- Groove Interrupted: Loss, Renewal, and the Music of New Orleans, Keith Spera (2011)
- Keeping the Beat on the Street: The New Orleans Brass Band Renaissance, Mick Burns
- Roll With It: Brass Bands in the Streets of New Orleans, Matt Sakakeeny
- Jazz Times Magazine, Oct 1994, N'awlins Brass Bands - Rebirth of the School
- Best Music Writing 2008, Nelson George, Da Capo Publishing (2008)

== Discography ==
=== As leader ===
- Here to Stay! (Arhoolie, 1984)
- Feel Like Funkin' It Up (Rounder, 1989)
- Do Whatcha Wanna (Mardi Gras, 1991)
- Kickin' It Live Mardi Gras New Orleans 1990 (Special Delivery/the Network 1991)
- Take It to the Street (Rounder, 1992)
- Rollin (Rounder, 1994)
- We Come to Party (Shanachie, 1997)
- The Main Event: Live at the Maple Leaf (Louisiana Red Hot, 1999)
- Hot Venom (Mardi Gras 2001)
- Rebirth For Life (Tipitina's Records 2004)
- 25th Anniversary (2008)
- Rebirth of New Orleans (Basin Street, 2011)
- Move Your Body (Basin Street, 2014)
- Recorded Live At The 2019 New Orleans Jazz & Heritage Festival (Munckmix, 2019)

=== As guest ===
- Ani DiFranco, Red Letter Year (Righteous Babe, 2008)
- N'Dea Davenport, N'Dea Davenport (V2, 1998)
- Dirtfoot, Coming Up for Air (Gus and Hank, 2013)
- Bo Dollis, I'm Back ... at Carnival Time! (Rounder, 1990)
- Dumpstaphunk, Dirty Word (Louisiana Red Hot)
- John Fogerty, Wrote a Song for Everyone (Vanguard/Columbia, 2013)
- G. Love & Special Sauce, Coast to Coast Motel (Okeh, 1995)
- G. Love & Special Sauce, Kiss and Tell (Okeh, 1995)
- Maceo Parker, Southern Exposure (Novus, 1993)
- Maceo Parker, Maceo (Minor Music, 1994)
- Mutemath, Armistice (Teleprompt/Warner Bros., 2009)
- Robbie Robertson, Storyville (Geffen, 1991)
- Kermit Ruffins, Throwback (Basin Street, 2005)
- Edward Shearmur, The Skeleton Key (Varese Sarabande, 2005)
- V/A, Straight from the 6th Ward (Tipitina's Records, 2003)

== Gallery ==
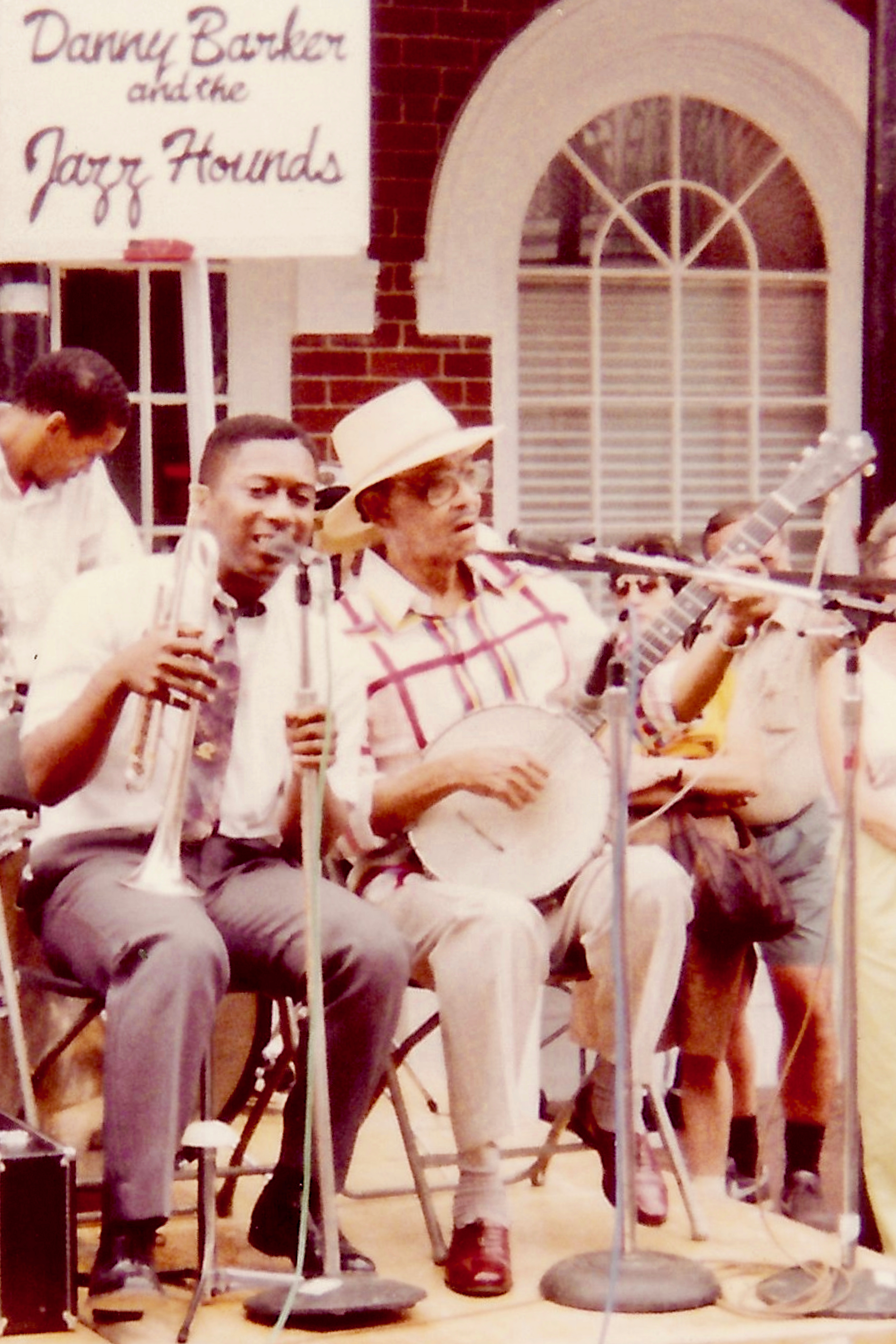
Kermit Ruffins (left) with the late Danny Barker at French Quarter Festival

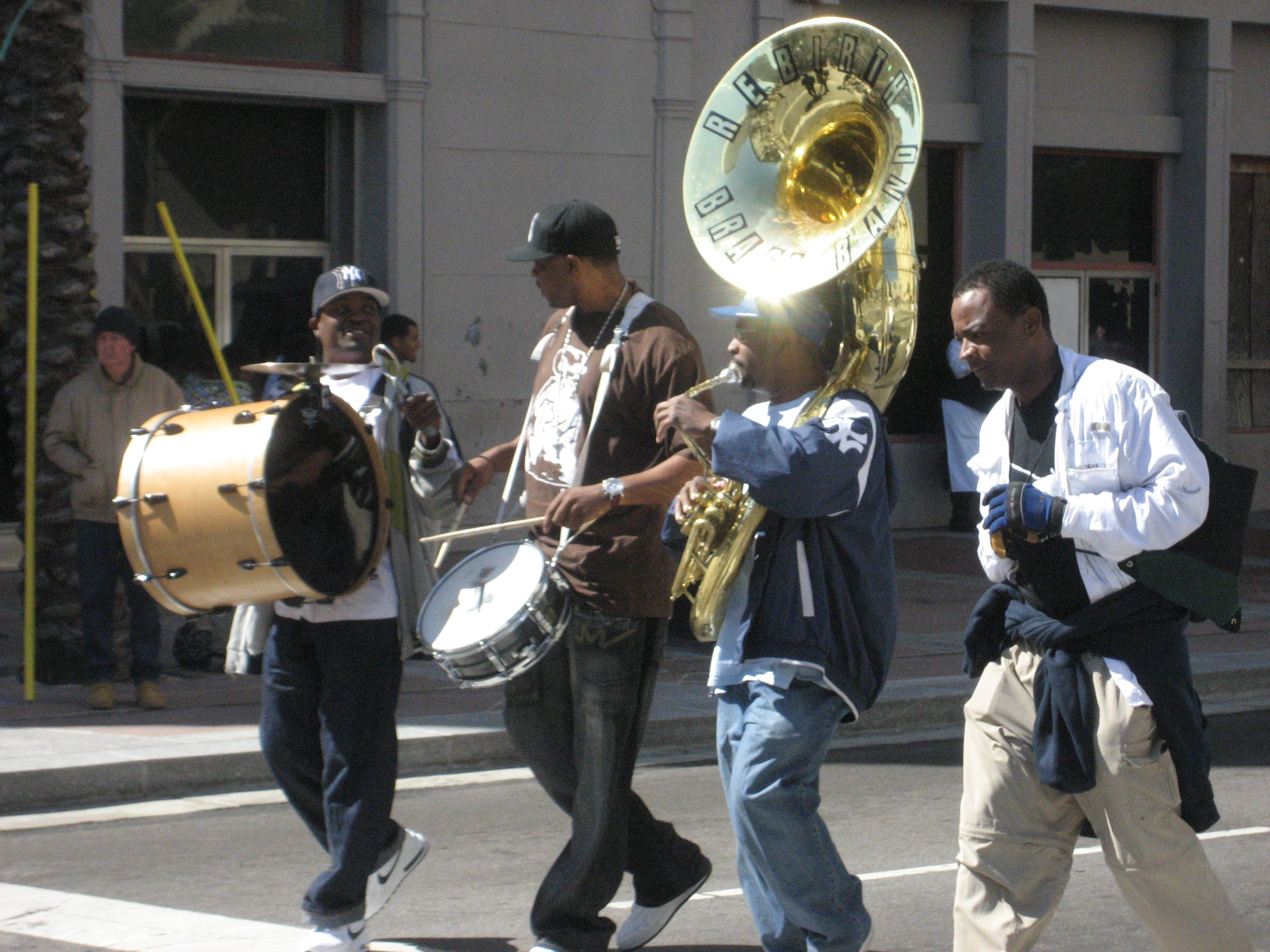
Second line Oct. 29, 2007

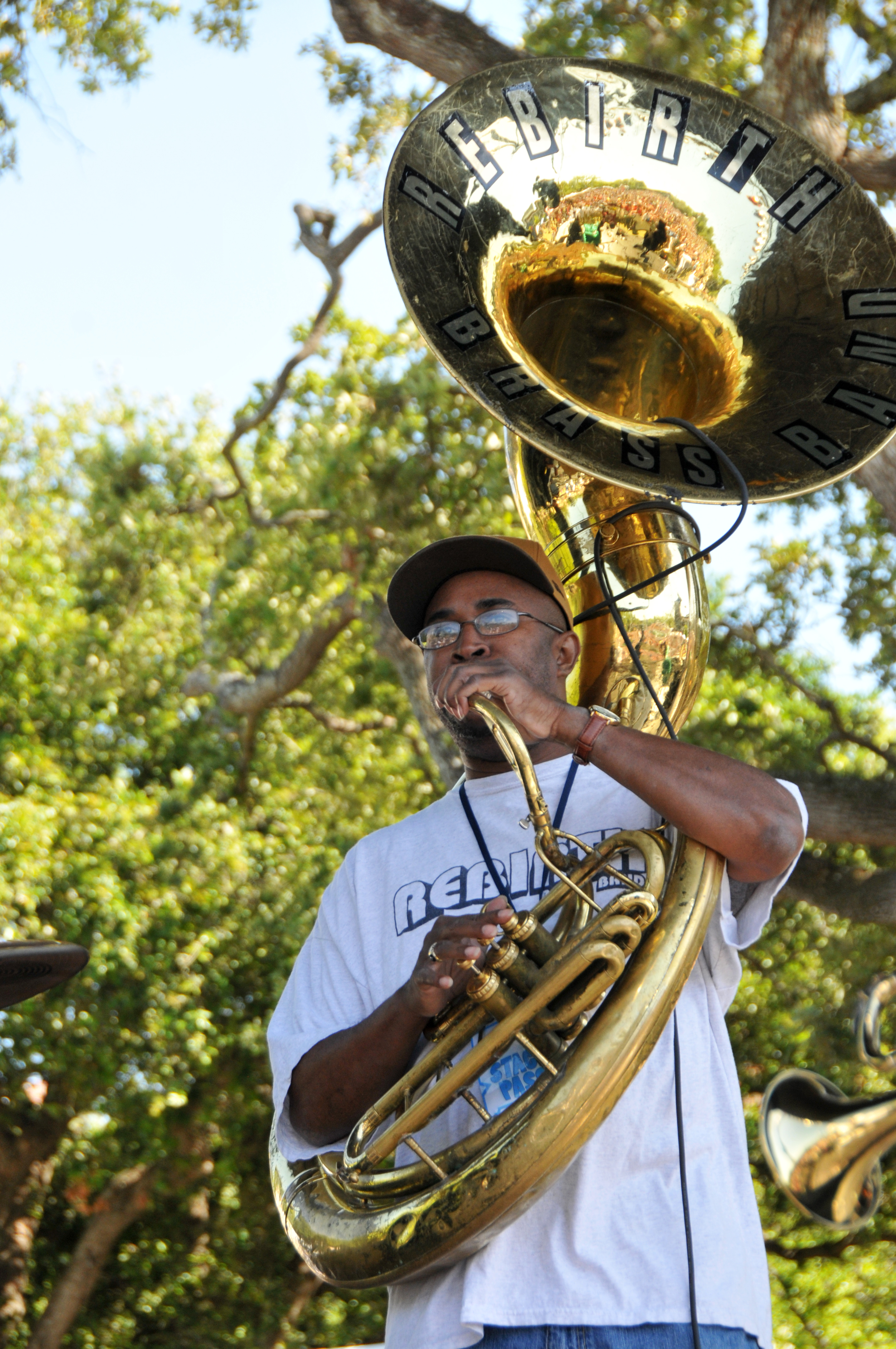
Phil Frazier, Crawfest 2011
