= Helen Hill =

American animator, filmmaker and social activist (1970–2007)

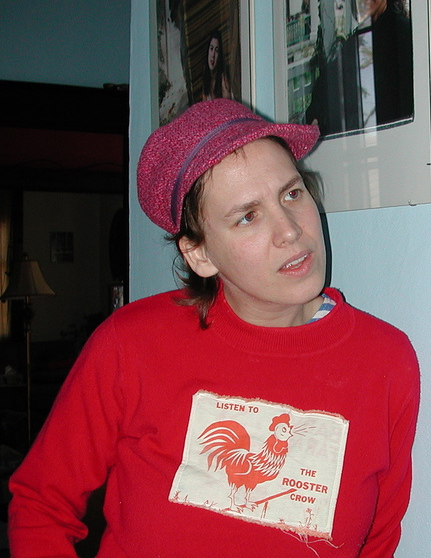
- Hill in New Orleans in 2006
- Born: Helen Wingard Hill; May 9, 1970; Columbia, South Carolina, U.S.
- Died: January 4, 2007 (aged 36); New Orleans, Louisiana, U.S.
- Education: Harvard University; California Institute of the Arts
- Occupations: Film director, animator, songwriter
- Spouse: Paul Gailiunas (m. 1995)
- Children: 1

Helen Wingard Hill (May 9, 1970 – January 4, 2007) was an American artist, animator, filmmaker, writer, teacher, and social activist. When her final film, The Florestine Collection, was released in 2011, curators and critics praised her work and legacy, describing her, for example, as "one of the most well-regarded experimental animators of her generation".

Hill's death at the age of 36 brought considerable media attention. In 2007, an unidentified intruder shot and killed her in her New Orleans home. Her death (one of six murders in the city that day), coupled with the murder a week before of New Orleans musician Dinerral Shavers, sparked civic outrage. Thousands marched against the rampant and continuing post-Katrina violence in New Orleans. This "March Against Violence on City Hall" drew significant press coverage throughout the United States and beyond. However, in the years following that tragic notoriety, Hill's life and creative work have been widely celebrated, with her films continuing to circulate to a degree they did not during her lifetime. In 2012, Daniel Eagan wrote about Hill as one of "Five Women Animators Who Shook Up the Industry".

== Biography ==
Hill was a native of Columbia, South Carolina, where she lived until graduating from Dreher High School in 1988. She identified herself as a Southerner (although after marrying Paul Gailiunas, a Canadian citizen originally from Edmonton, Alberta, she later became a dual US-Canadian citizen) and had deep roots in her home city of Columbia. Her mother, Becky, named her Helen Wingard Hill after her own mother, Helen Addison Wingard, another Columbian.

Hill began creating short animated films at age 11. After the documentary filmmaker Stan Woodward visited her fifth-grade class, Hill made a stop-motion Super 8 film that she entitled The House of Sweet Magic (1981). Made on a tabletop at home, it shows a toy dinosaur attacking a gingerbread house. That same year, she and her classmates (assisted by Susan Leonard of the South Carolina Arts Commission and teacher Penelope Rawl) made another Super 8 movie as part of a statewide filmmaking-in-the-classroom initiative. Quacks, a live action film with a musical track recorded separately on audiocassette tape, is a comic vignette featuring a person in a duck costume interacting with school children at their bus stop.

Hill earned her A.B. at Harvard University in 1992, where she majored in English and minored in Visual and Environmental Studies (the academic department housing filmmaking). While at Harvard she made the 16mm animated short Rain Dance (1990) as well as two other animated films.

After graduating from Harvard, Hill and her Harvard Class of '92 classmate Paul Gailiunas, merely a close friend at the time, headed to New Orleans for the summer, drawn to the city's vibrant arts and music culture and its progressive social sensibility. That summer they fell in love, and the couple married in Columbia, South Carolina, two years later.

Hill further developed her artistic work while completing her Masters of Fine Arts degree at California Institute of the Arts. Upon her graduation from CalArts in 1995, she moved to Halifax, Nova Scotia, Canada where Gailiunas was attending Dalhousie University Medical School. Hill continued to create films and teach film animation at the Nova Scotia College of Art and Design (now NSCAD University) and at the Atlantic Filmmakers Cooperative (AFCOOP). The couple lived in Halifax's culturally diverse but economically depressed North End (which she paid tribute to in her film Bohemian Town (2004)).

In December 2000, the couple returned to New Orleans with their cat Nola and their pot-bellied pig Rosie, settling in the Mid-City district. On October 15, 2004, Hill gave birth to their son, Francis Pop.

She continued to teach animation through the New Orleans Video Access Center (NOVAC) as well as the New Orleans Film Collective, which she co-founded.

In August 2005, Hill and family were temporarily displaced and lost most of their possessions due to the Hurricane Katrina levee failures, which flooded their Mid-City home, along with some 80% of the city. They relocated to Columbia, South Carolina and stayed with family there for a year. Hill persuaded her husband (in part by rallying friends in an ingenious postcard campaign) to move the family back to New Orleans in August 2006. She continued to make films and engage in grassroots activism, which focused on rebuilding the city and the Faubourg Marigny neighborhood. She was a visiting artist and teacher at the New Orleans Center for Creative Arts at the time of her death.

== Death ==
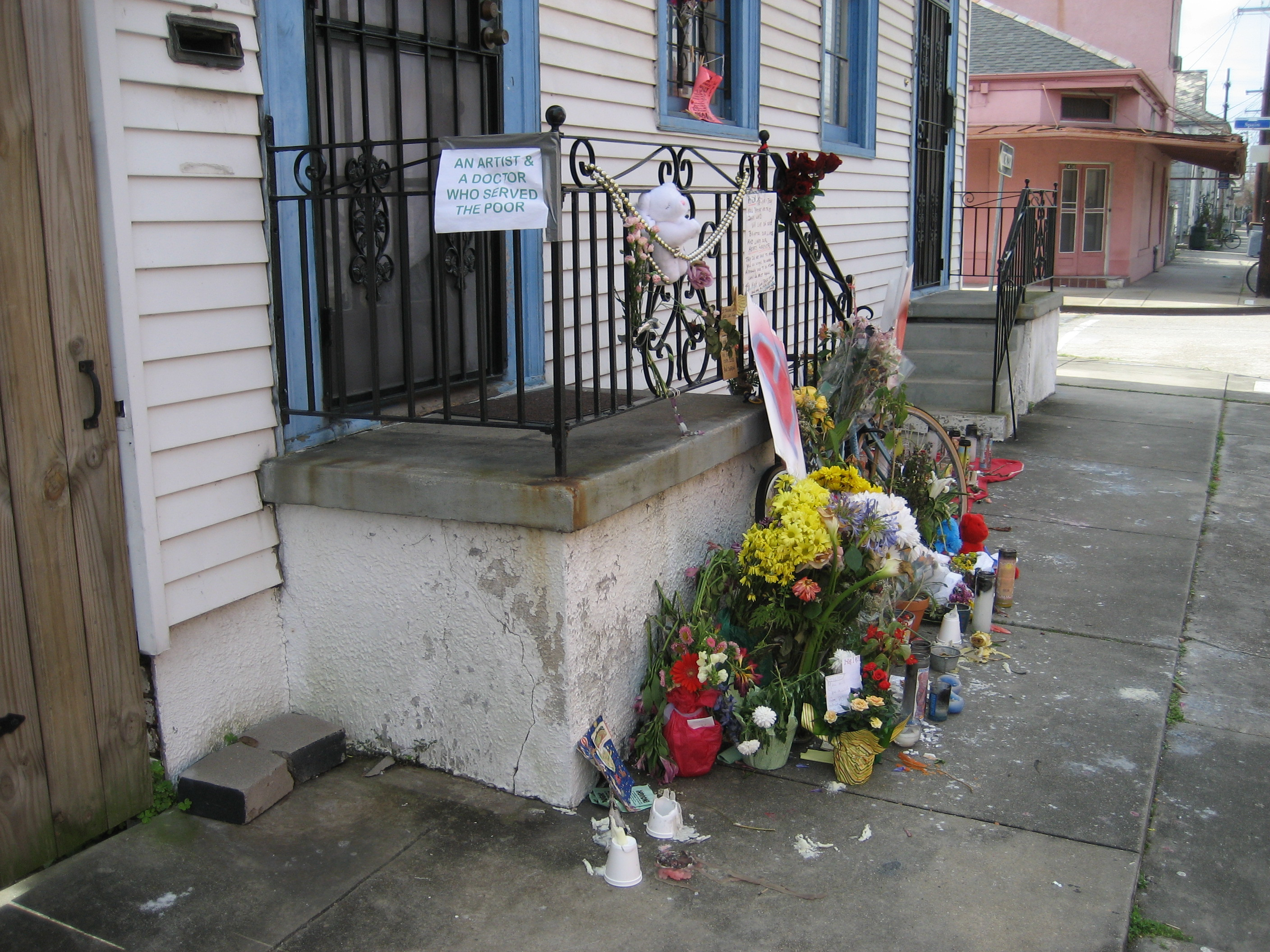
Memorial items outside Hill & Gailiunas' house

Hill was murdered at approximately 5:30 in the morning on January 4, 2007, by an unknown intruder in her home in the Faubourg Marigny neighborhood. Her husband was shot three times and survived; their toddler son was uninjured. Shortly beforehand, the intruder had apparently attempted to rob a bed-and-breakfast a few houses down the street. Police were questioning the bed-and-breakfast's owners when they heard gunshots at Hill's house.

As of 2026, the New Orleans Police Department has made no arrest in the case, despite a $15,000 Crimestoppers reward being offered for any information leading to an indictment. The case has received extensive media coverage, including national radio, television, and print coverage in the United States and Canada.

Hill's murder was one of a spate of killings in the first week of 2007 in New Orleans, prompting civic outrage that culminated in a march on City Hall on January 11, 2007, sometimes referred to as the March for Survival. Organizers Helen Gillet (a friend to both Hill and Shavers), Ken Foster, and Baty Landis went on to form the nonprofit organization Silence Is Violence, which remains active in its "campaign for peace in New Orleans".

== Film and artwork ==
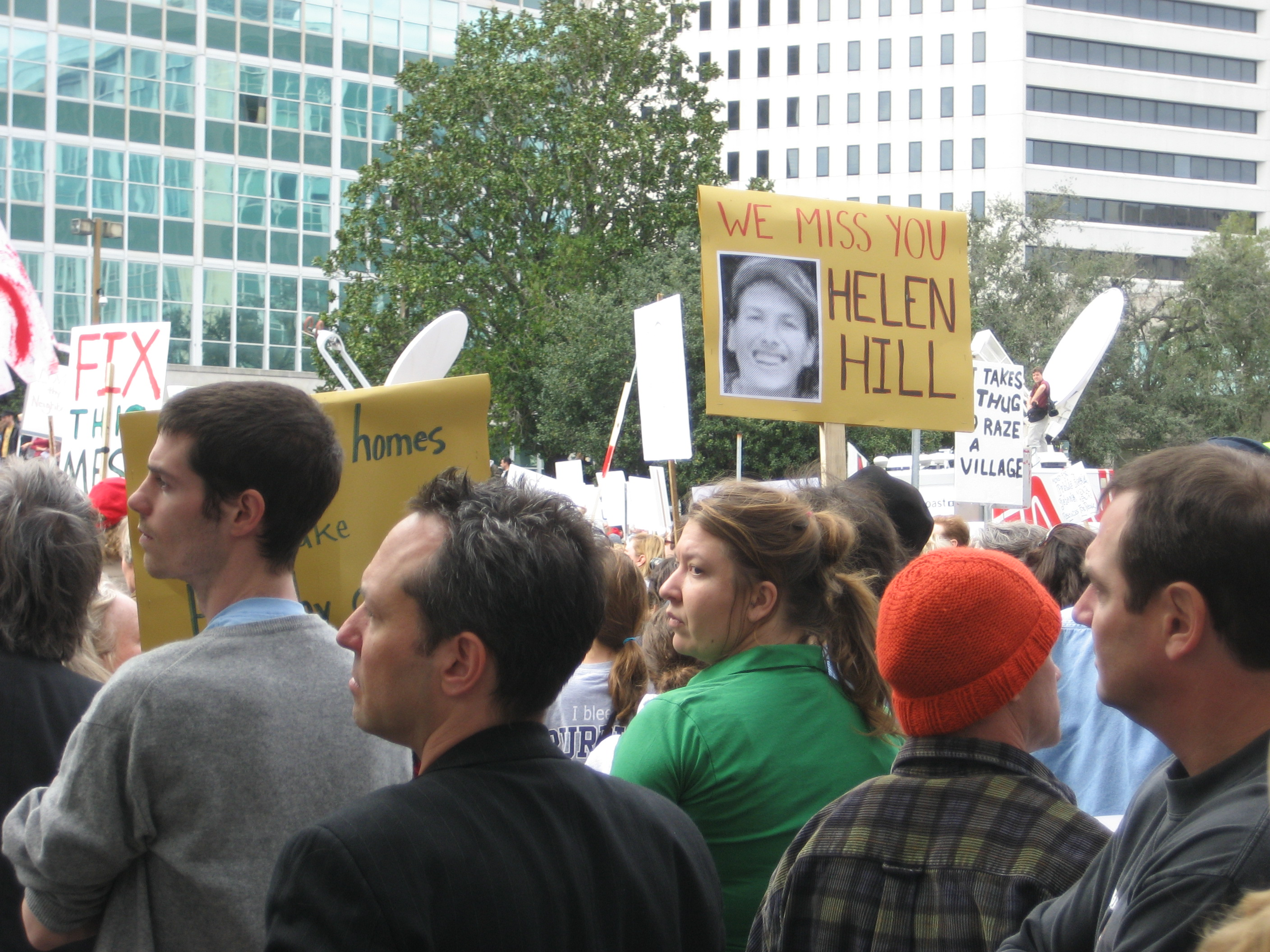
Marchers outside City Hall with sign remembering Hill

In filmmaking technique, Hill took inspiration from animation pioneer Lotte Reiniger's two-dimensional silhouette puppets. Hill's films incorporate many other techniques, such as stop motion, three-dimensional puppets, cel cycles, and "direction animation" (drawing and scratching on celluloid). In the mid-1990s, Hill became attracted to do-it-yourself methods of filmmaking, such as hand processing and tinting or toning images by hand. In 1999 and 2000, she attended Phil Hoffman's Independent Imaging Retreat in Mount Forest, Ontario, Canada, to develop her hand-processing skills. Hand-crafted film techniques found their way into her film work, most notably in Mouseholes (1999) and Madame Winger Makes a Film (2001).

In addition to her body of work in film, Hill took on other roles, curating The Ladies' Film Bee program at the 2000 Splice This! Super 8 Film Festival (Toronto) and compiling and editing a reference book of hand-crafted film techniques Recipes for Disaster: A Handcrafted Film Cookbooklet (2001, revised 2004, 2006). After Hurricane Katrina, Hill's interests in film expanded into archiving. She gave talks at CalArts, the University of South Carolina, and other venues, promoting do-it-yourself techniques for archiving and restoring motion picture film. The moving image archivist Kara Van Malssen worked with Hill as part of her 2006 New York University master's thesis, "Disaster Planning and Recovery: Post-Katrina Lessons for Mixed Media Collections."

Hill's films earned awards and were featured in significant festivals (such as the Ann Arbor Film Festival). In 2004, she was awarded a Media Arts Fellowship Grant by the Rockefeller Foundation for her achievements in film. She used this award to begin production on The Florestine Collection, an animated documentary inspired by a collection of about one hundred hand-sewn dresses she found in a garbage pile in New Orleans in 2001. This film was completed (in 16mm) by Gailiunas and friends and was awarded the Short Documentary Award at the 2011 DOXA Documentary Film Festival. In 2008, the Robert Flaherty Film Seminar posthumously gave Hill its Charles Samu Award, given to an animator whose work conveys "a universal message illuminating our sense of world community".

In 2007, Harvard Film Archive established its Helen Hill Collection, preserving films, drawings, photographs, art works, writings, music, and ephemera. Ten of Hill's animated and experimental works are available for archival loan and exhibition as a compilation reel of 16mm film prints.

In March 2008, New York University organized "Anywhere: A Tribute to Artist and Activist Helen Hill," an evening of newly preserved work by and about Hill. The screening opened the 6th Orphan Film Symposium in New York. NYU's Department of Cinema Studies, the University of South Carolina Film Studies Program, and the Nickelodeon Theatre presented the inaugural Helen Hill Awards to filmmakers Naomi Uman and Jimmy Kinder for their works "affirming Helen Hill's artistic legacy, lived values, and everyday passions".

In 2009, the Librarian of Congress named Hill's film Scratch and Crow (1995) to the National Film Registry, a list of aesthetically, historically, and culturally significant American motion pictures. The Library's news release stated: "Helen Hill's student film was made at the California Institute of the Arts. Consistent with the short films she made from age 11 until her death at 36, this animated short work is filled with vivid color and a light sense of humor. It is also a poetic and spiritual homage to animals and the human soul."

Scholarship on Hill's work includes three recent essays. In 2019, Anne Major published “Sweet Magic: The Preservation of Helen Hill’s Cinema,” in The Moving Image, and Janine Marchessault, “Some Recipes for Disaster in the Films of Deidre Logue and Helen Hill.” More recently, Karen Redrobe authored “Unnatural Disasters Unfinishable (Inter)(in)animation,” a chapter in her book Undead: (Inter)(in)animation, Feminisms, and the Art of War (2025).

== Filmography ==
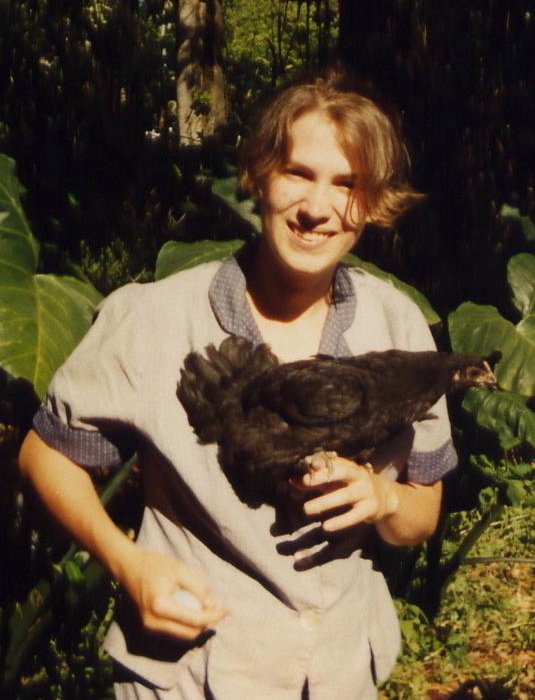
Hill in New Orleans, 1993

Hill made the following films:

- The House of Sweet Magic (1981)
- Quacks (1981, with classmates Shack Allison, Kevin Curtis, Cissy Fowler, Brannon Gregg, and Creighton Waters, at Brennen Elementary School)
- Rain Dance (1990; soundtrack reconstructed 2007)
- Upperground Show (1991)
- Vessel (1992)
- No Smoking in the Theater (1995)
- The World's Smallest Fair (1995)
- Scratch and Crow (1995)
- Tunnel of Love (1996)
- "Fast Fax" for CBC-TV's StreetCents (1997–1998)
- I Love Nola (1998)
- Your New Pig is Down the Road (1999)
- Mouseholes (1999)
- Film for Rosie (2000)
- Madame Winger Makes a Film (2001)
- Five Spells (2001)
- [New Orleans Video Access Center poetry project film] (ca. 2002–05)
- Termite Light (2003, with Courtney Egan)
- Rosie Wonders What to Wear (2003)
- film for Haley Lou Haden's By Bread Alone (ca. 2003)
- film for Haden's puppet theater One Life, Magic Cone (ca. 2003)
- Gothtober Baby (2004)
- Bohemian Town (2004)
- Halloween in New Orleans (2005)
- 16mm blowup, flood-damaged Super 8 home movies (2006)
- Cleveland Street Gap (2006, with Courtney Egan)
- A Monster in New Orleans (2006)

Interview with filmmaker Hill, March 27, 2006

- More than 40 Super 8 films, home movies (early 1990s – January 2007)
- The House of Sweet Magic: Films By Helen Hill (a compilation DVD released in 2008 by Peripheral Produce, a Portland-based distributor of experimental films). The compilation includes: Tunnel of Love; Madame Winger Makes a Film; Scratch and Crow; Your New Pig Is Down the Road; The World's Smallest Fair; Vessel; Film for Rosie; Mouseholes; and Bohemian Town.
- The Florestine Collection (2011), a film by Helen Hill, completed by Gailiunas. Jury Award, Ann Arbor Film Festival; Short Documentary Award, DOXA Documentary Film Festival (Vancouver).

Also, Hill appears in

- Mermaids and Pickles (1999, Trixy Sweetvittles)
- Film Farm Dance (2001, Becka Barker)
- Phil's Film Farm (2002, John Porter; dedicated to Hill)
- Rox #90, "Fat" (2004, Frowning Cat Productions) giving a vegan perspective on the Atkins diet
- Working Portraits (2005, Maïa Cybelle Carpenter)
- Orphan Ist. (2006, Lauren Heath, Erin Curtis, and Mike Johns)
- [Home Movie Day New Orleans] (2006, Kelli Shay Hicks)
- [Interview with Helen Hill at the 5th Orphan Film Symposium] (2006, Lauren Heath, Erin Curtis, and Mike Johns), in which she answers the question "What is an orphan film?"
- Helen Hill: Celebrating a Life in Film (2007, SCETV)
- "One Year Later, New Orleans Grieves for Artists," 20-min. report by Noah Adams, All Things Considered, NPR, December 25, 2007.
- "Storm of Murder," CBS 48 Hours Mystery (October 13, 2007)
- Helen Hill 2026 Complex (2026, David Bagnall), trailer for the Orphan Film Symposium's Helen Hill Award.
- Mystery in New Orleans: Helen Hill, a four-part series, WWL-TV (June 12, 2026).
- Mystery in New Orleans: The Haunting Helen Hill Story, WWL-TV, exec. producer and investigative reporter Katie Moore (June 22, 2026) 93 min.

== References in media ==
- Edward Sanders (of the band The Fugs) published "Ode to Helen Hill" (2007), a 3,000-word "biographic poem on the New Orleans filmmaker", in Woodstock Journal.
- Helen LaBelle (1957), an animated film by Lotte Reiniger, was restored by the Deutsches Filminstitut in 2008; the restoration's end credit reads in part: "in memory of Helen Hill (1970–2007), animator and Lotte Reiniger devotee".
- Francis Pop's Hallowe'en Parade (2007, Francis Pop Gailiunas and Paul Gailiunas) is dedicated to Hill.
- Season 2 of the HBO television drama series Treme, shot in New Orleans, includes a story line about the real-life murders of Hill and Dinerral Shavers.

== Activism and songwriting ==
Hill was a lifelong peace activist and advocate of several grassroots social justice causes. Together with her husband, Dr. Paul Gailiunas, she helped initiate the Free Food Organization in Halifax in 1995. This later became a part of Food Not Bombs, which is still in operation. Also with her husband, she initiated several anti-smoking and anti-tobacco sponsorship campaigns. She was also a vegan and an animal rights activist, lending her support to rescue sanctuaries for pot-bellied pigs and other abandoned pets.

Whilst living in Halifax, Gailiunas formed a band called Piggy: The Calypso Orchestra of the Maritimes which recorded six albums between 1995 and 2001. Hill co-wrote the anarchist song "Emma Goldman" on their 1999 album Don't Stop the Calypso: Songs of Love and Liberation. After Hill and Gailiunas moved to New Orleans, he started a new band called The Troublemakers and re-released the song "Emma Goldman" on their 2004 album Here Come The Troublemakers. Proclaiming the motto "It's your duty as a citizen to troublemake," other songs on the album include "International Flag Burning Day".

"Emma Goldman" was performed at Hill's jazz funeral in New Orleans.

== See also ==
- List of unsolved murders (2000–present)
- Independent animation
- List of American independent films
