= Dirtfoot =

US musical group

- Origin: Shreveport, LA, USA
- Genres: Gypsy, Punk, Country, Grumble, Boogie.
- Years active: 2003–present
- Members: Matt Hazleton; J Bratlie; Wayne Anderson; Cory Knippers; Spencer Terkel; John Hoffman
- Past members: Lane Bayliss; Daniel Breithaupt; Aaron Butler; Eric Gardner; Nathan Woods; Sam Apperson; Garrett Brolund; Scott Gerardy; Derek Russell
- Website: dirtfoot.com

Dirtfoot is a band from Shreveport, Louisiana that was founded in 2003. It consists of six members playing guitar, banjo, saxophone, upright and electric bass, drums and various percussion instruments. The band call the music they play "Gypsy Punk Country Grumble Boogie".

== History ==
=== The beginning ===
Founding members Matt Hazelton and J Bratlie met in April 2000 when an Easter tornado dropped a tree on Hazelton's house. J was walking past his neighbor Matt's house when they met, and a friendship began. Very soon they were jamming and writing together.

The earlier forms of Dirtfoot began as a short-lived band Gus and Hank and later Doodlebug where Scott Gerardy joined the group. The band's early days consisted of an open-door policy, a time when many people joined and left the group. At one point or another there was an electric bass, cello, trombone, dedicated washboard player and many different drummers and percussionists.

The band officially began to take form with the additions of Eric Gardner on upright bass, Lane Bayliss on drums, and Aaron Butler on percussion.

By early 2004, Dirtfoot was beginning to gain a foothold in the Shreveport music scene, playing underground shows, private parties, and small bar gigs. 2005 was a year of building fans and beginning to tour in the immediate area.

=== Entertain Me ===
Things began to move with Dirtfoot winning the Shreveport Times Battle of the Bands in January 2006. Shows soon followed in Dallas, Austin, Hot Springs, Tulsa. Then the band went to Fairfield Studios in Shreveport to record their first record. Entertain Me was recorded by Dana McCommon and mixed by Steve Sullivan and released in December 2006. During this period, Aaron Butler left the band, and Daniel Breithaupt joined as the new percussionist.

=== Festivals and Chompdown ===
Touring continued, and during the Spring of 2007, Dirtfoot participated in the Waka Winter Classic in Tulsa, OK, coming in 3rd place. The promoters of the winter classic liked what they saw, and the band was offered a spot at Wakarusa Music Festival in June 2007.

A few months before the fest, the band was approached by Jon "Rabbit" Cabrera about playing a communal breakfast they were calling the Chompdown. Chompdown consisted of members of the Wakarusa Forum who wanted to donate food, grills and time to provide a free breakfast to as many people as possible. Cabrera approached the band via the now nearly defunct Myspace and asked if Dirtfoot would like to perform. The band agreed, and the first annual Chompdown was born.

With the support of about 20 forum members, Cabrera and his crew fed 250–300 campers while Grazgrove and Dirtfoot performed. Dirtfoot was soon booked for the Mulberry Mountain Harvest Festival, and the Chompdown moved there as well.

In October 2007, Dirtfoot entered TheArtistRevolution.com's Play Voodoo contest. Of more than a thousand entries, the top 10 would be chosen by a group of industry, festival reps, and musicians. Dirtfoot was among the winning entries. The band won a spot on the main stage at the 2007 Voodoo music festival.

=== Bone Sessions ===
The band continued to tour and build their following. A new album began to form, and Brady Blade recommended that Chris Bell, of Dallas TX, engineer the new endeavor. Chris specializes in capturing live sound and has recorded artists like The Eagles, Erykah Badu and Polyphonic Spree. During the summer of 2008, Dirtfoot and Chris Bell met at Bass Propulsion Labs in Dallas TX. Over five days they recorded the entire Bone Sessions album. Another four-day mixdown and Bone Sessions was created. The master was shipped to Gavin Lurssen (Tom Waits, T Bone Burnett) for mastering, and November 22, 2008 was set as the album release date.

With the release of Bone Sessions, things took off. In November 2008, Dirtfoot was named a finalist in the Independent Music Awards Alt Country Song contest. In December, the band was named Skopemag.com's Artist to Watch. In February 2009, the band backed up Victoria Williams during her performance at the Folk Alliance in Memphis. This performance introduced the band to Isobel Campbell of Belle and Sebastian. In April, members of the band recorded some tracks which are featured on her album, Hawk.

In December 2009, the band was once again named a finalist in the 9th Annual Independent Music Awards for Alt Country Song. The following February, the PBS series, Music Voyager, came to Shreveport to do a special on North Louisiana music, and Dirtfoot was featured on the program. The show aired on PBS in December 2010.

The remainder of 2010, the band was busy with trips to New York City to record an episode of Groovable Feast, a midwest tour with Mountain Sprout supporting the Wakarusa Music Fest.

Eric Gardner left the band in July 2010 and Nathan Woods, a contemporary of the Shreveport music scene, was brought in to play the upright bass. However, it was quickly determined that Nathan's prowess on the electric bass proved well-suited for Dirtfoot's high energy live shows. Consequently, the addition of an electric, often-distorted instrument into the acoustic sextet, brought more of the "rock-n-roll" influence already present in the group's material, to the forefront. The band played many music festivals over the summer and played their first main stage performance at Yonder Mountain Harvest Fest later that year.

=== Dirtfoot - Live and In Prison ===
In November 2010, the band recorded the live performance of what would become their first live record, Dirtfoot - Live and In Prison. The recording took place at Wade Correctional Facility in Homer, LA and included video shoots at Citizen National Bank in Bossier City, the Bayliss home in Shreveport, the Voodoo Lounge in downtown Shreveport, and the Berry home in Shreveport.

A music video for "Cast My Plans" was filmed on 35mm film. The video featured the band members portraying criminals in various acts of mischief and their inevitable incarceration. While in prison, the warden, played by William Sadler, proposes that the band perform for their fellow inmates, and the final footage of the video is the band providing a raucous shake-down of a show.

In addition to a music video, a documentary crew headed up by Joey Barto of Fairfield Studios followed the band around as the video was shot and at the live performance. The documentary The Making of the Cast My Plans video is featured on the Live and In Prison DVD.

In December 2010, the band signed with The Agency Group for booking and Pipeline Management for management.

In April 2011, a Kickstarter campaign to raise funds for the completion of the Live and In Prison project began. With an initial goal of $10,000 the band arrived at $16,200 after only 30 days. Due to the additional funds, the Live and In Prison record was printed on vinyl.

=== 2011 ===
During January and February 2011, the band played their first support tour with the Rev. Horton Heat across Texas and Colorado with dates in Denver, Ft Collins, Colorado Springs, and many resort towns.

In May 2011, the band toured as support for the band Primus. Five nights in Indianapolis, Memphis, Houston, Dallas and a sold-out show in Austin exposed the band to a new audience.

In June 2011, the band performed their first Main Stage at Wakarusa and premiered their music video on the big screens. Later that year, they played a record five sets at Yonder Mountain Harvest Festival.

October 2011 saw another support tour with Jamgrassers Cornmeal, a short headline run with The Giving Tree Band and a featured in Music Connection Magazine - New Music Critiques In December 2011, the Live and In Prison project was officially released.

December 2011 marked the Official Release of Live and In Prison and released it at the New Year's Eve Show with Mountain Sprout at Georges Majestic in Fayetteville, AR to a sold out audience.

=== 2012 ===
While being named finalists in the 11th Annual Independent Music Awards for Short Form Music Video Category for "Cast My Plans" in May it was April when Dirtfoot was awarded the Grand Prize of the John Lennon Song Writing Contest - NOLA Jazz Competition. They went on to record a live version of "Bathroom Sink" on John Lennon Educational Tour Bus. Shortly after, Lane Bayliss parted with the band. In August, they won the “Vox Populi” Award for the Independent Music Awards for Short Form Music Video.

In September, Shreveport drummer Derek Russell joined the band and a month later backed Dirtfoot for a Main Stage performance at Yonder Mountain String Band's Harvest Festival.

=== 2013 ===
February found Dirtfoot taking part in From Elvis to Johnny: Celebrating 65 years of the Louisiana Hayride sponsored by Oxford American and the Louisiana Tourist Commission and in April became a member of the Louisiana Music Ambassador Project.

In May a successful Kickstarter campaign was completed raising $20,290 for recording of fourth album, Coming Up for Air.

On Nov 5, 2013 Dirtfoot officially released "Coming Up for Air".

=== "Coming Up For Air" ===
Dirtfoot's fourth album, Coming Up for Air, was recorded at Blade Studios in Shreveport, LA and produced by Brady Blade. Chris Bell (Erykah Badu, the Eagles) took care of engineering and mixing and Gavin Lurssen (Tom Waits, T Bone Burnett) took care of mastering. This album was funded via Kickstarter with the help of 175 good people. The record also features the Rebirth Brass Band, Papa Mali and Tim Carbone. Official Release date is Nov 5, 2013

=== 2014 ===
With the departure of Daniel Breithaupt and Nathan Woods early in 2014, Dirtfoot looked to Derek Russell to expand his rhythm responsibilities while calling on his band mates from local Shreveport band Magnolia Brown, Garrett Brolund on bass and Sam Apperson in the new position of lead guitar. The band continued to tour throughout the year.

=== 2015-present ===
Early 2015 saw the departure of Gerardy and not long after Apperson, Russell and Broulund left as well to focus on Magnolia Brown. With only two members left, the founders set out to refresh the roster. Local musicians, Spencer Teekell (upright bass) John Hoffman (drums) and Cory Knippers (trombone) jumped in to fill the spots in late March and by late May the band was back on the road. The final piece for the new lineup came later in the year as guitarist Wayne Anderson joined as the second lead.

In 2025, John Hoffman became the drummer for Primus.

== Discography ==
- 5 Song Demo (2006)
- Entertain Me (2006)
- Bone Sessions (2008)
- Live and In Prison (2011) CD/Vinyl
- Coming Up For Air (2013) CD/Vinyl

== DVD releases ==
- Live and In Prison (2011)
