= The Roots of Music =

American music educational organization based in New Orleans

- The Roots of Music
- Formation: 2007
- Type: Youth organization
- Legal status: Non-profit organization
- Purpose: "to teach, protect and empower youth through music education, academic support and mentorship while preserving and promoting New Orleans’ great musical and cultural heritage"
- Headquarters: New Orleans, Louisiana
- Location: United States
- Region served: Orleans Parish, Louisiana
- Founders: Derrick Tabb; Allison Reinhardt
- Website: The Roots of Music

Roots of Music, Inc. is a non-profit educational organization based in Orleans Parish, New Orleans, Louisiana. The organization operates an after-school program which provides academic tutoring and music mentoring for at-risk middle school students ages 9–14.

== History ==
After Hurricane Katrina, funding for public school music programs, specifically middle schools, was reduced or cut. Rebirth Brass Band snare drummer, Derrick Tabb and Allison Reinhardt developed a plan to establish a youth organization for music that would be citywide with the primary objective being to keep young children off the streets and provide a safe haven during peak times of gun violence - 3pm to 7pm. In 2007, Reinhardt and Tabb co-founded Roots of Music, Inc. and launched a pilot program in May 2008. The Roots of Music Crusader Band debuted in 2009 to wide critical acclaim. The program now services 140 students with a waiting list of approximately 400.

== Program ==
Video of Derrick Tabb teaching The Roots of Music drumline a marching routine 12/15/15 (HD, with audio)

Students accepted into the Roots of Music after-school program participate in both academic tutoring and are members of the Roots of Music Crusaders Band. They are transported by bus from about 40 schools in Orleans Parish Monday through Thursday to the group's headquarters in the Tremé neighborhood of New Orleans.

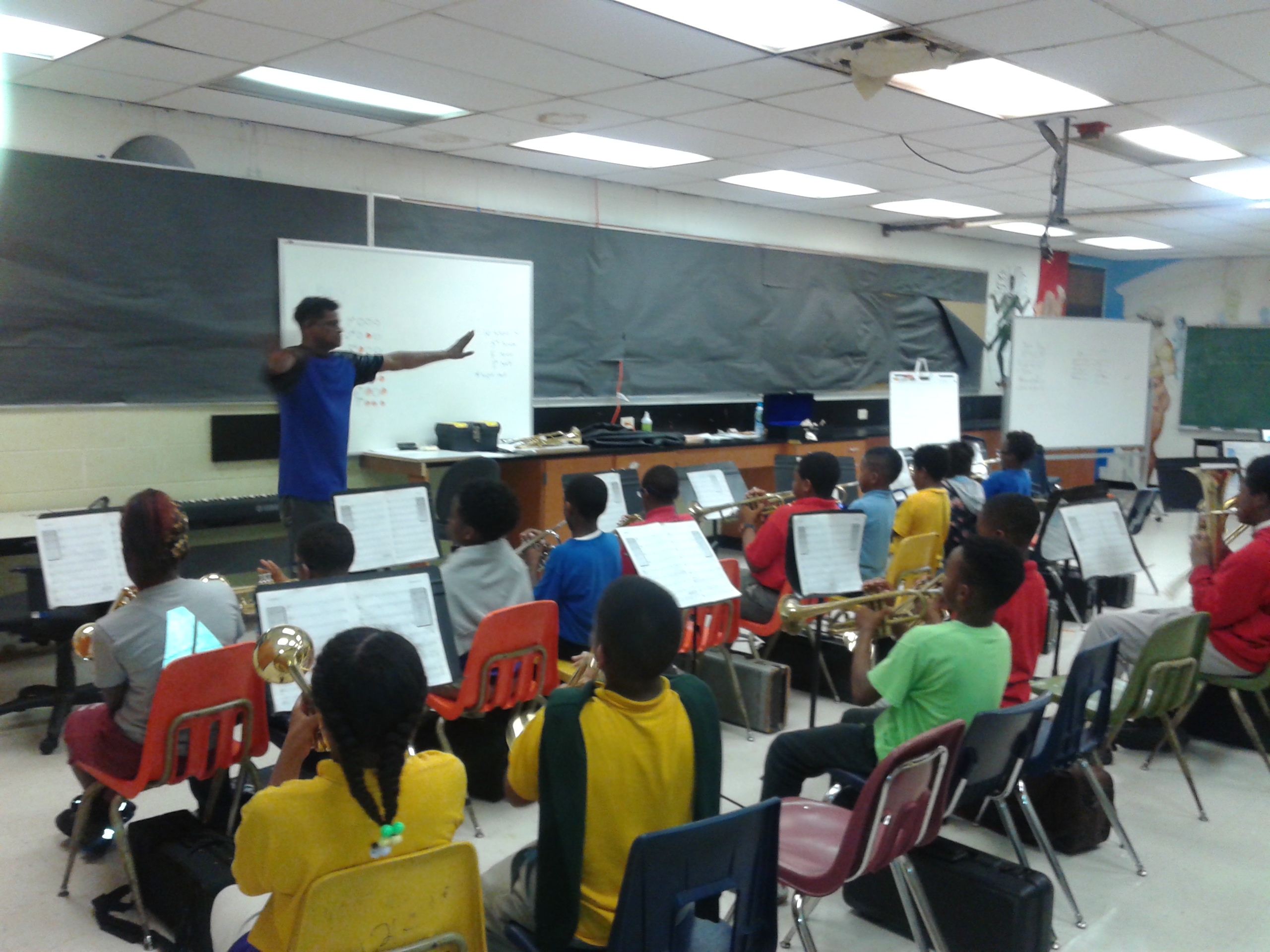
Roots of Music instructor, Arden Jones, directing the brass section during practice 11/17/15

For the first hour and a half of the after-school program, the students receive assistance with homework assignments and academic tutoring in core subjects as needed. The remainder of the time is dedicated to music education, song rehearsal and field practice (marching). Members of the Rebirth Brass Band and other New Orleans area music professionals support the program through mentoring and marching practice.

After music education and rehearsal, the students receive a hot, nutritious meal provided by Second Harvest Food Bank of Greater New Orleans and Acadiana, a member of the Feeding America network of food banks. After the meal, the children are transported via bus to their homes across Orleans Parish.

There is no after-school program on Fridays, but the group practices on Saturdays, focusing wholly on music education, marching and field routines. The students receive a hot meal after Saturday practice and are transported home via the program's buses.

Aside from academic and music education, the organization strives to instill self-discipline, offers mentoring and guidance counseling and has the support of mental health professionals. The program is completely free to the participants and relies on grants and private and corporate donations for sustainability. Roughly 25% of the program's budget is earmarked for transportation services. Lack of transportation was cited as one of the issues plaguing the families of at-risk children in regard to their ability to participate in extra-curricular activities. Roots of Music, Inc. holds a 501(c)(3) tax-exempt status.

== Application process and guidelines ==
Students of the Roots of Music after-school program must be between the age of 9 and 14 years old, qualify for free or reduced lunch, and attend a school in Orleans Parish. The participants must also maintain a 2.5 grade point average in all classes, the same requirement as the Taylor Opportunity Program for Students (TOPS). TOPS pays tuition and some fees for qualifying college students who chose to attend a select group of colleges in Louisiana.

Students are expected to learn and abide by a code of conduct which emphasizes academic achievement, respect of self and others, self-discipline and self-control.

== Accolades ==
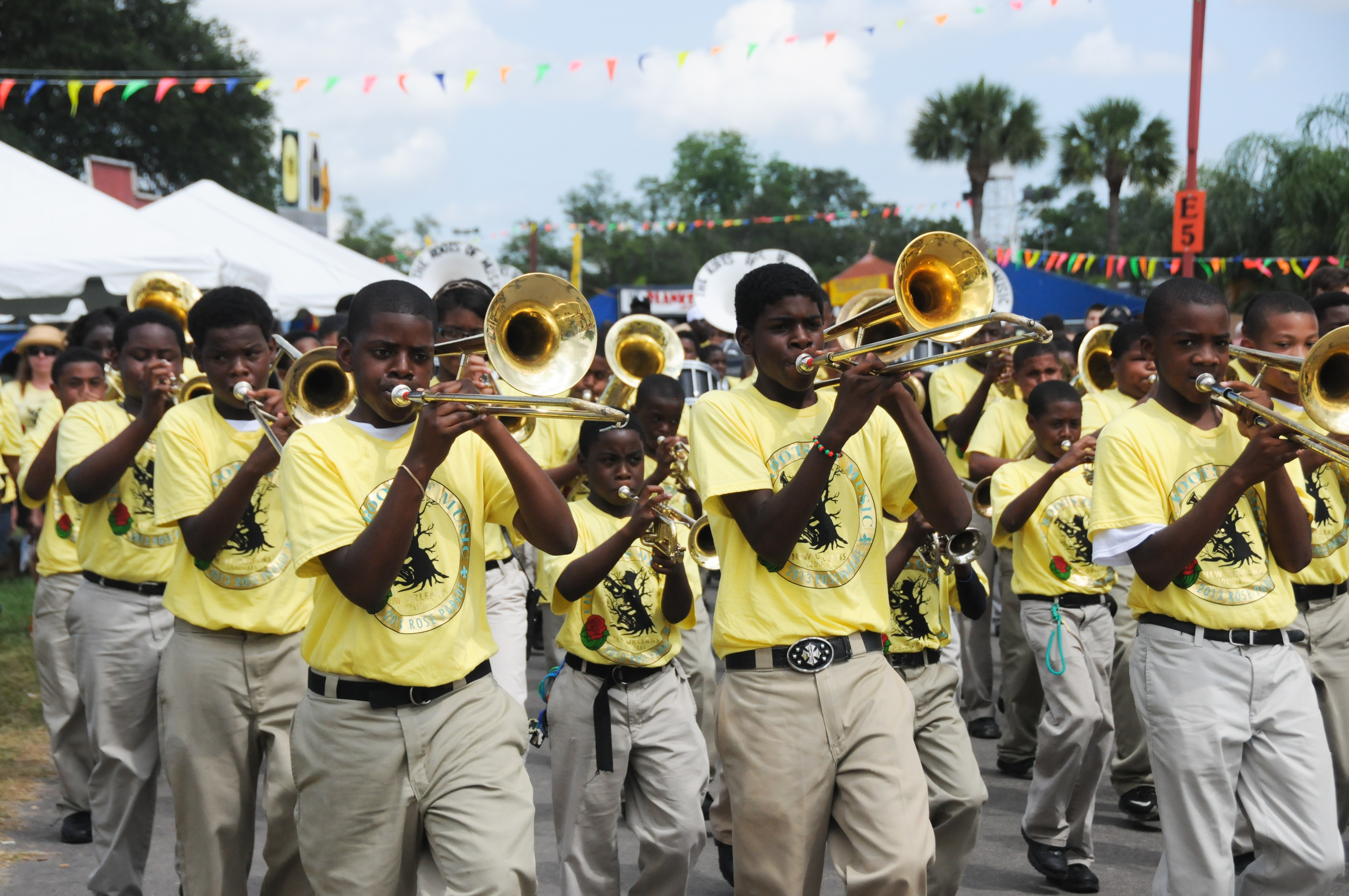
Roots of Music Crusaders Band at Jazz Fest 2012

The Roots of Music and its co-founder Derrick Tabb have been the subject of numerous news articles. Tabb has been the recipient of several awards based on his work with Roots. In May 2009, Tabb was chosen as one of the 10 2009 CNN Heroes Top Finalist from over 9,000 entries. Derrick was also a recipient of the 2011 Blue Cross Blue Shield Angel Award. (see Derrick Tabb: Awards and honors for more comprehensive list)

After the Essence Music Festival in New Orleans in 2011, The Roots of Music Crusaders performed at an exclusive $1,000-a-plate benefit concert hosted by Brad Pitt benefiting the Make It Right Foundation. The event was attended by Snoop Dogg, Rihanna and Kanye West.

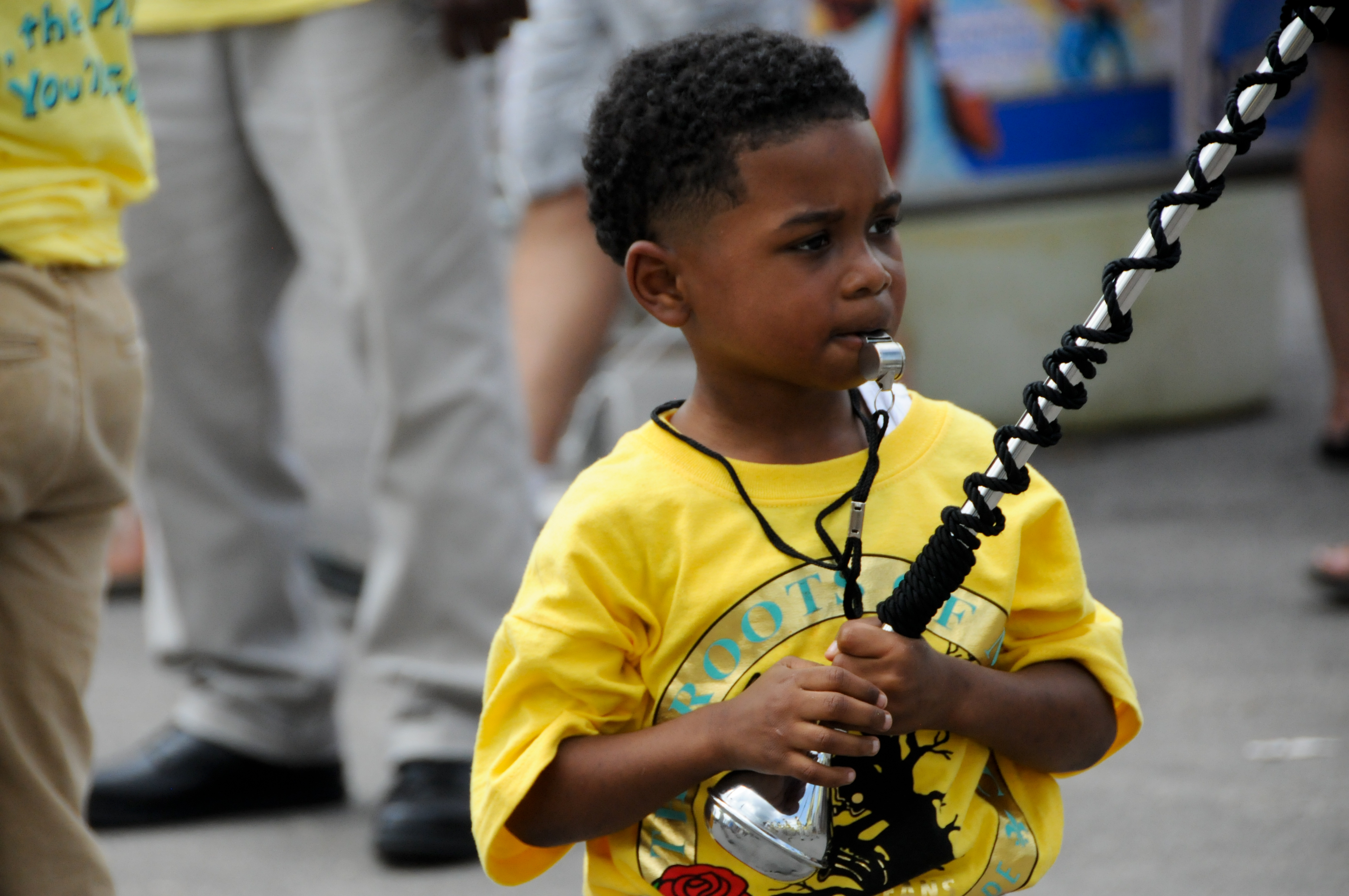
Roots of Music drum major "Tutta" at Jazz Fest 2012

The band participated in the New Orleans Jazz & Heritage Festival ("JazzFest") in 2012 and 2013.

In the 2013 Rose Parade, Roots boasted the youngest drum major in the parade's history, 6 year-old Lawrence Honoré, Jr. Also in 2013, Roots was the recipient of StubHub's Rising Star Award.

In 2015, Roots performed for President Barack Obama during his visit to New Orleans to commemorate the 10th year since Hurricane Katrina devastated the area. During his speech, he praised the Roots of Music mentoring program. On January 11, 2016, The Roots of Music performed during the pre-inauguration festivities for Louisiana Governor John Bel Edwards.

Roots alumnus, Jazz Henry, performed at the Essence Music Festival in 2012 and in JazzFest 2014 with The Original Pinettes Brass Band.

== Discography ==
The Roots of Music Crusaders appear on the title track of the studio album ¿Which Side Are You On? by Ani DiFranco (2012).

== Television, movies and video ==
- Roots of Music band members Jaron "Bear" Williams (seasons 2–4) and Jazz Henry (seasons 3–4) had recurring roles on HBO's television series Treme (2011–13)
- Treme mentions Roots of Music in the series finale episode "...To Miss New Orleans" (December 2013)
- Documentary film The Whole Gritty City (2013) chronicles the journey of the Roots of Music as they prepare for Mardi Gras season
- 48 Hours Presents: The Whole Gritty City (2014). This episode of 48 Hours won a Christopher Award in the TV and Cable category.
- From Roots to Roses (2015). This documentary film recorded the journey for the Roots of Music to the world wide-known Rose Parade, which made a history in both New Orleans and the parade.
- The Roots of Music are featured on Bonnie 'Prince' Billy's 2017 music video and recording of "The Curse" by The Mekons.

== Gallery ==
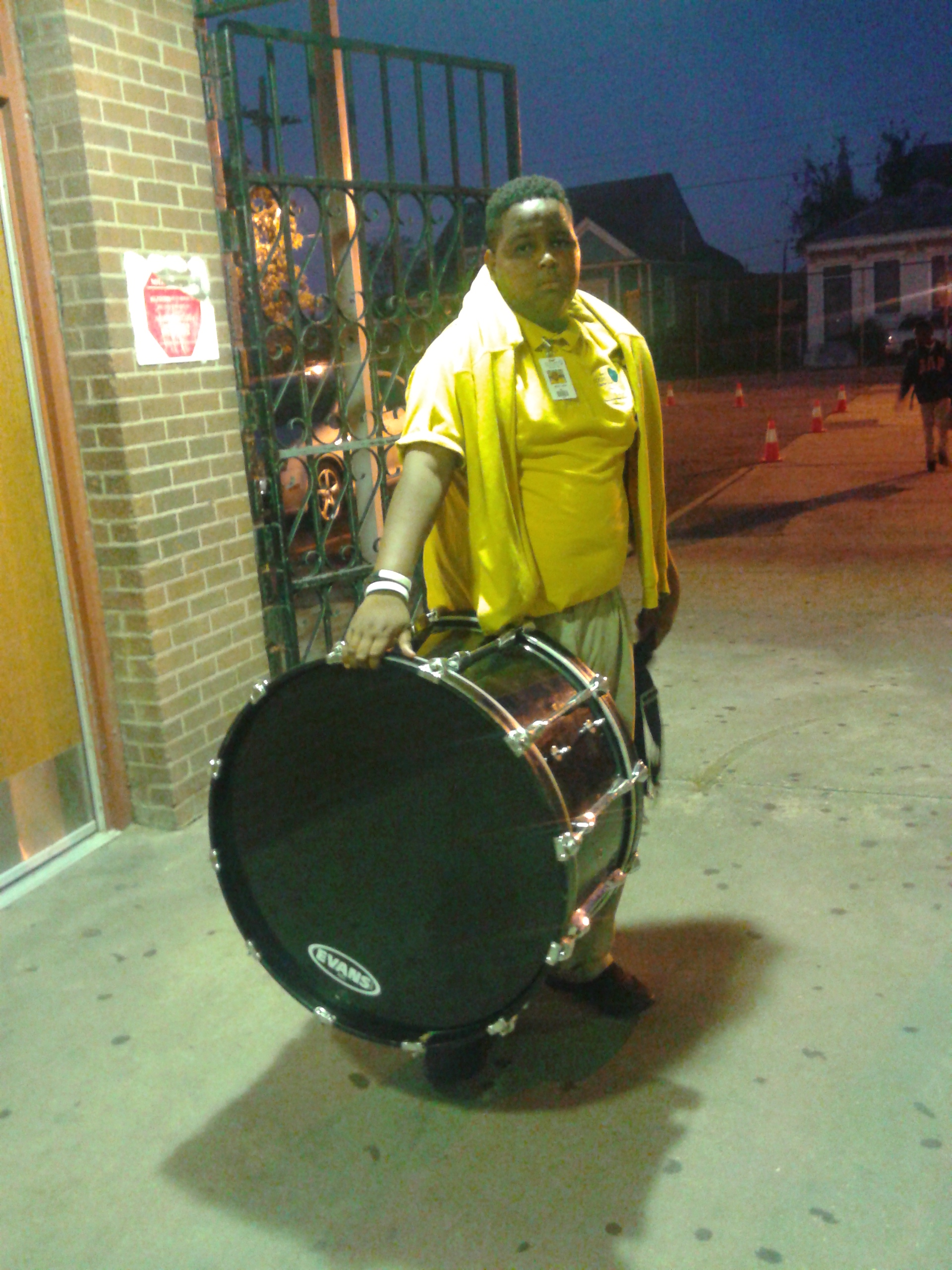
Bass drum student heading to field practice 12/7/15

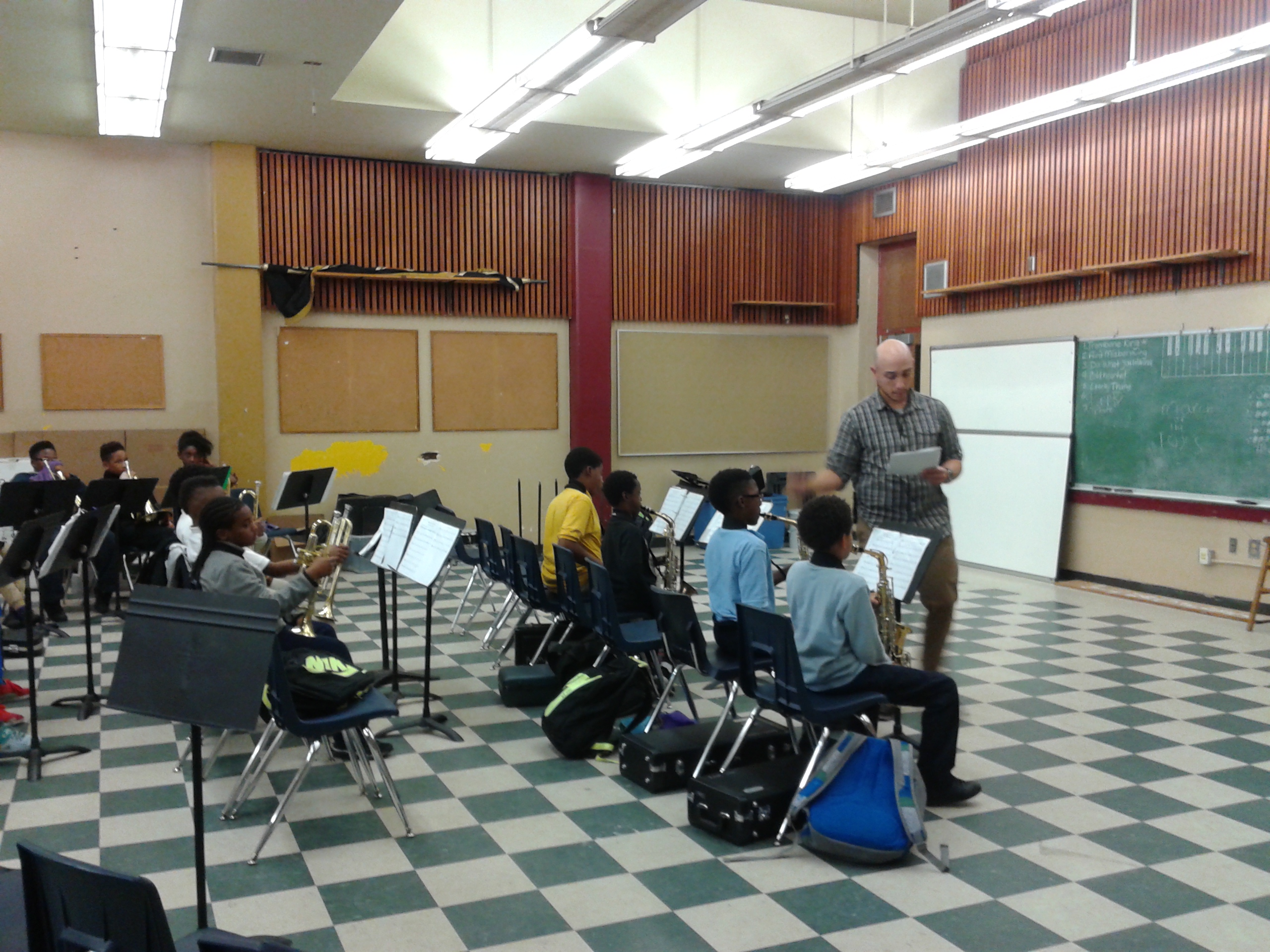
Allen Dejan, Music Director for The Roots of Music 12/8/15

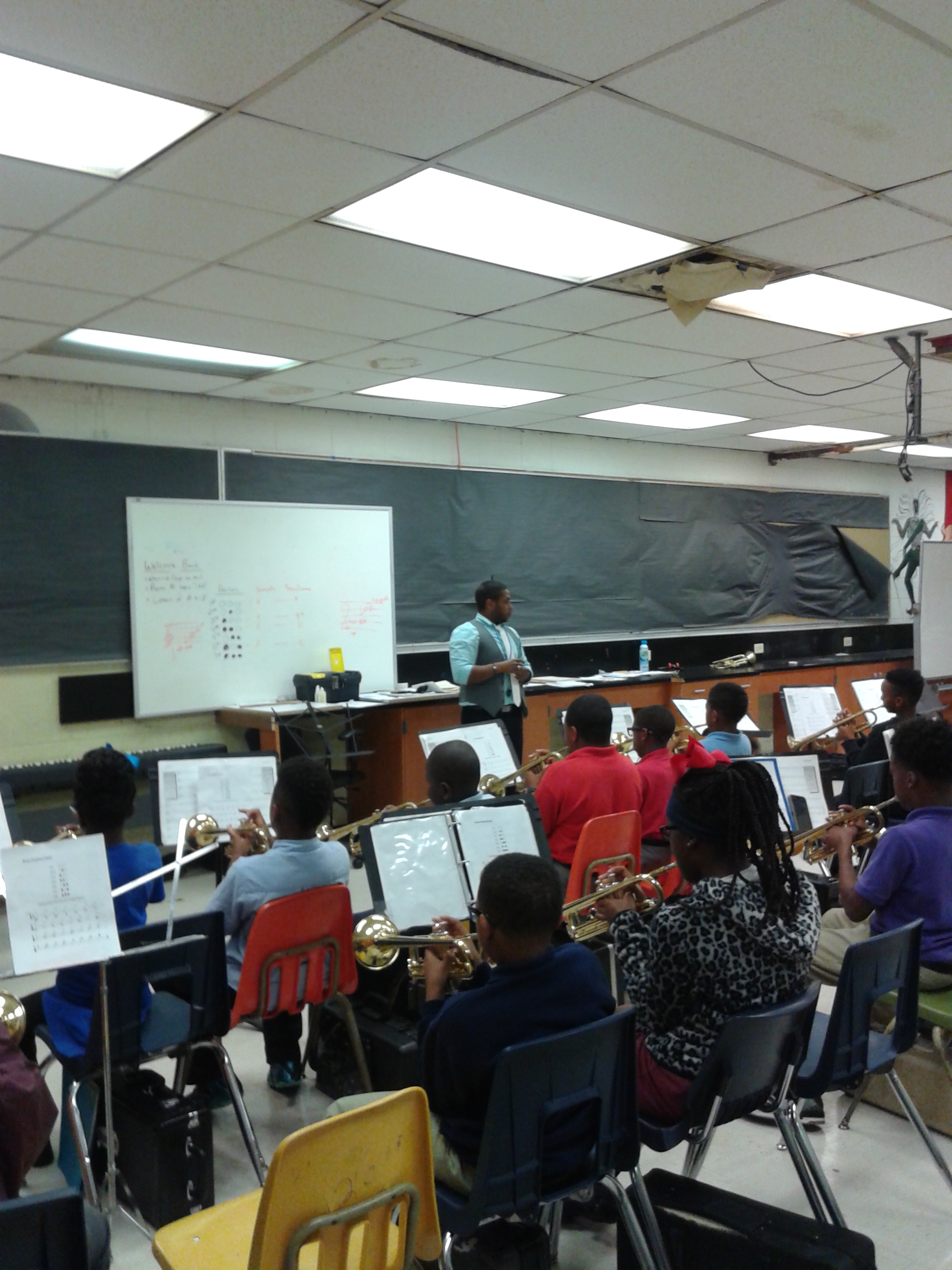
Ricio Fruge with students in music education class at The Roots of Music 12/8/15

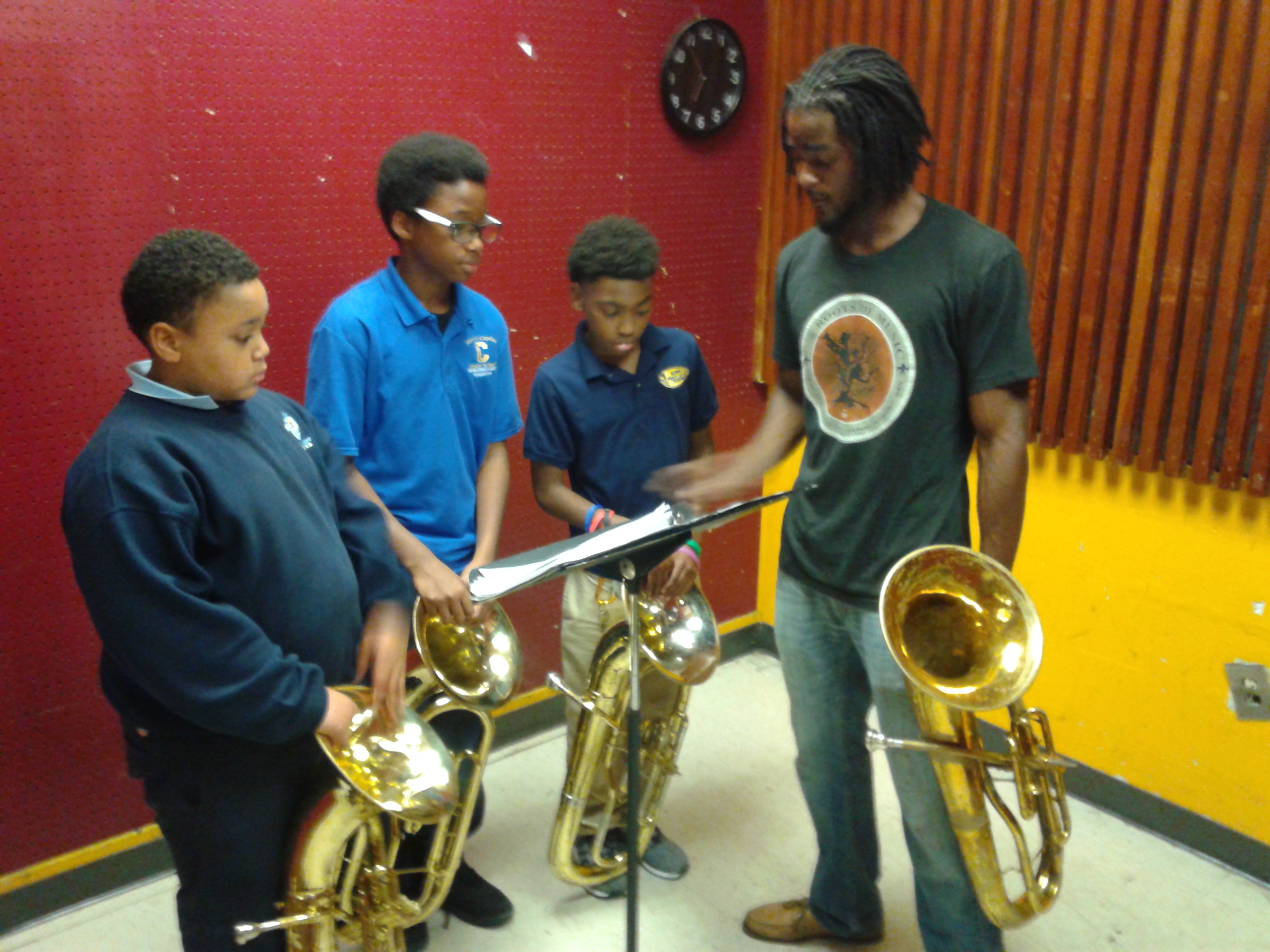
Music instructor, Lloyd Downs with brass section students 12/8/2015

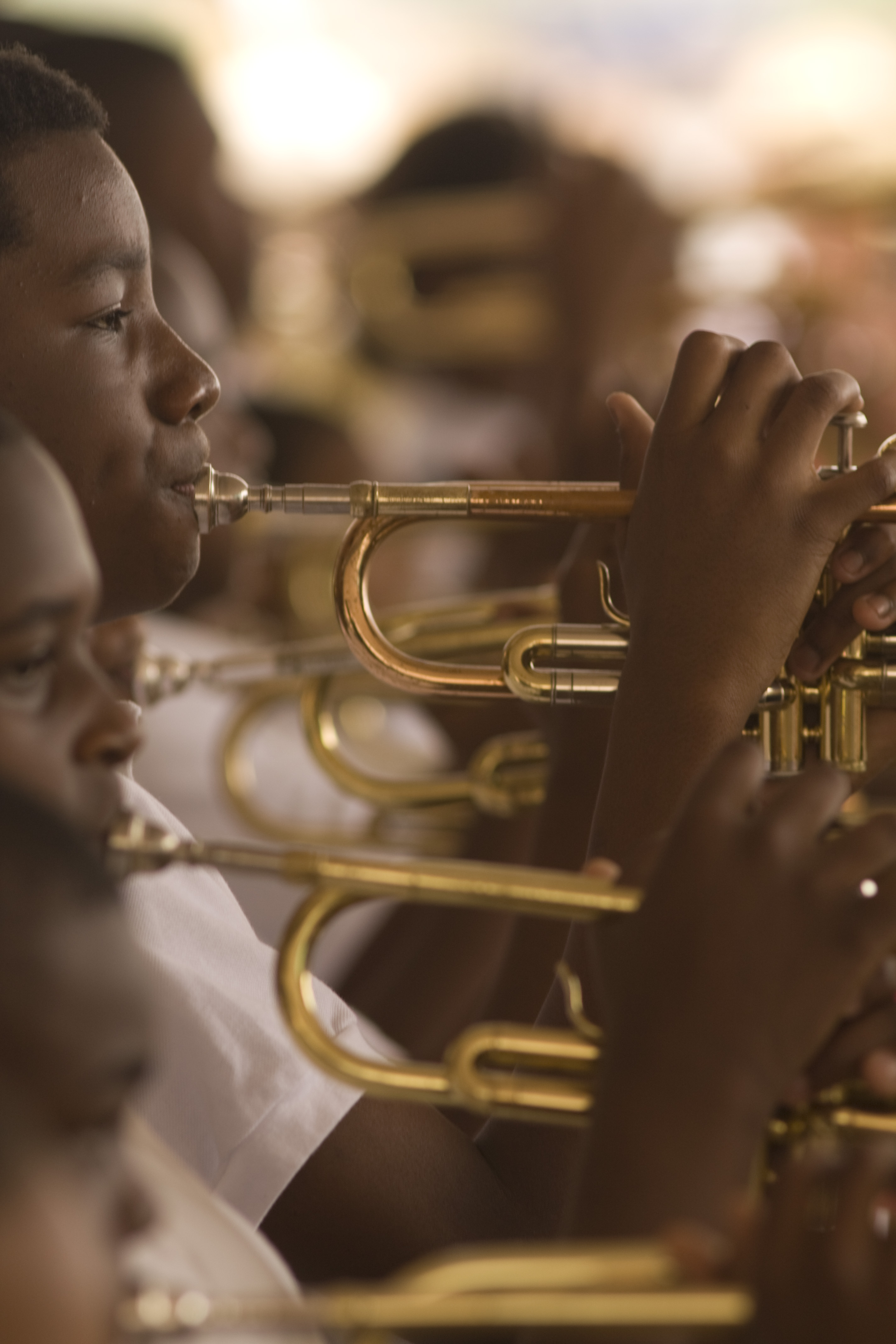
French Quarter Fest 2012

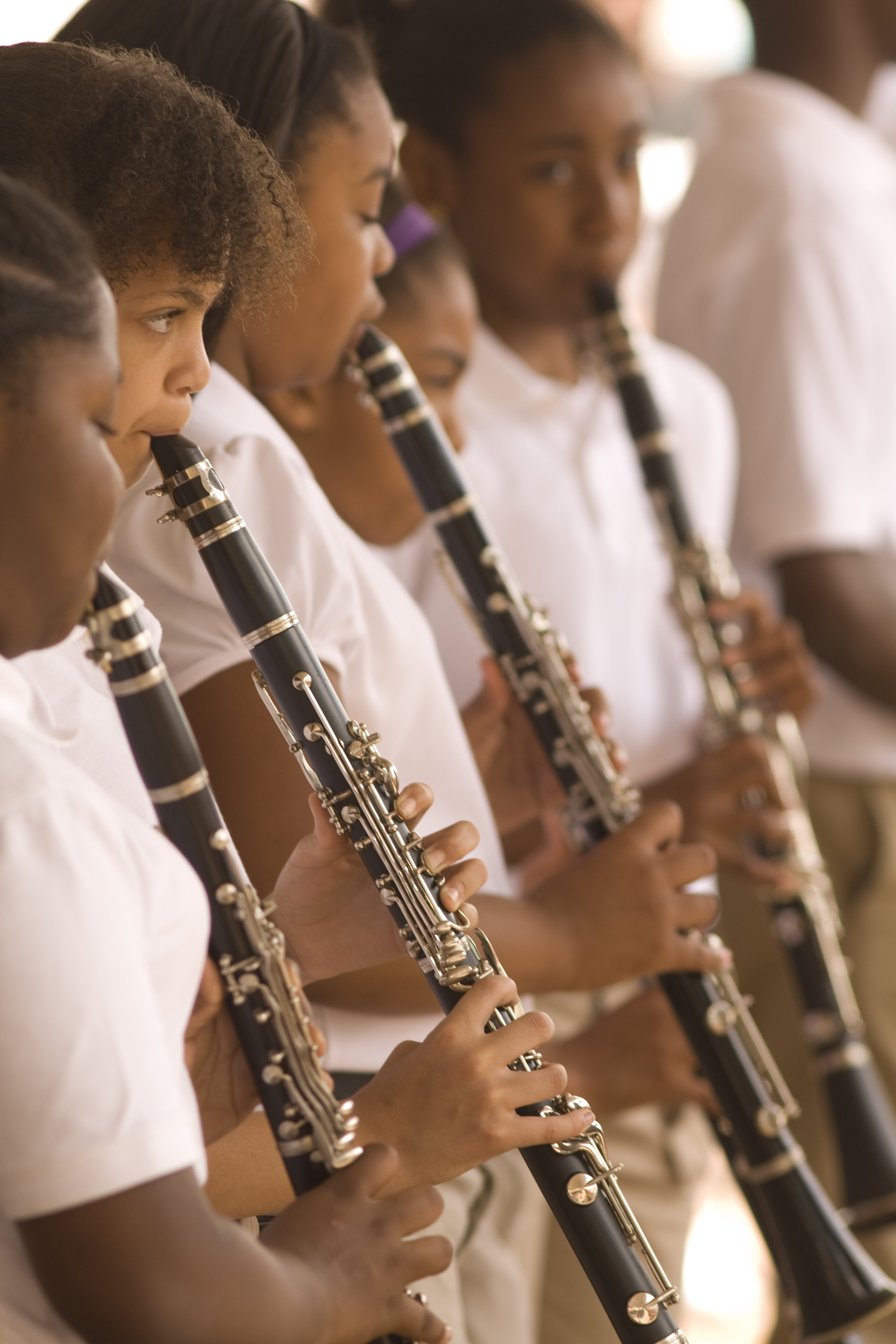
French Quarter Fest 2012
