= Scratch and Crow =

Frame from Scratch and Crow

Scratch and Crow (1995) is a four-minute, 16mm, animated film made by Helen Hill as her MFA thesis at the California Institute of the Arts. On January 1, 2017, an authorized Helen Hill Vimeo account launched and includes a high-resolution streaming version of the film, with this annotation: "This hand drawn animated film reveals the secret life cycle of chickens, from their hatching by mother cats to their noisy ascent into Heaven. Filmed in 16 mm."

== Summary ==
Harvard University Library created The Helen Hill Collection, 1990-2006: Film Guide (2011), which describes the non-narrative content of the film in this way: "Animated cats hatch eggs; watermelons fall from the sky; chickens become angels and fly out of tombstones; coiled springs symbolize inner meanings and then the film ends."

Scratch and Crow has no dialogue, spoken narration, or human voices. Its soundtrack is a mix of subtle sound effects and animals sounds. A non-narrative film, it includes three poetic intertitles written in the first person (e.g., "If I knew,/ I would assure you we are all / Finally good chickens / And will rise together, / A noisy flock of round, / Dusty angels.")

== Credits ==
The opening screen credit reads: "A film by Helen Hill." The closing credits: "Thanks to Maureen Selwood, Christine Panushka, Jules Engel, Eastman Kodak, Dollar-a-Day Doodlers. / made at calarts / © ch. hill 1995".

== Viewing copies ==
- The Helen Hill Vimeo page's streaming version of Scratch and Crow derives from a 2k scan of a 16mm print done by Colorlab for Paul Gailiunas.
- A 16mm film print is available at Harvard Film Archive and may be loaned with permission. A 16mm print, from the same source negative, may be viewed on-site, by appointment, at the George Amberg Film Study Center, Department of Cinema Studies, New York University.
- Scratch and Crow appears on the authorized DVD The House of Sweet Magic (2008), a compilation of nine films by Helen Hill. Distributed by the experimental film and video label Peripheral Produce.
- Timecode NOLA placed a low-resolution, watermarked video copy of "Scratch and Crow" on its Vimeo channel in 2011, part of a 59-minute "Helen Hill Showcase Tribute" (Vimeo title Timecode: NOLA 404). The video compilation includes seven films by Helen Hill, as well as an interview with Hill and footage of "New Orleans Against Crime City Hall Protest" (2007). Scratch and Crow begins at the 31:09 mark and ends at 35:32. .
- A party self-identified as Lost_Shangri_La_Horizon placed a low-resolution video copy of Scratch and Crow on a commercial website on Dec. 16, 2010. Approximately 80 other works from the National Film Registry appear on the Lost_Shangri_La_Horizon Daily Motion site. The video bears the watermark of the Timecode NOLA video described above.
- Colorlab preserved the film in 2007, contributing pro bono lab work for a consortium that included the Hill estate, Paul Gailiunas, Harvard Film Archive, the University of South Carolina, New York University, BB Optics, and the Orphan Film Project. Colorlab's new 16mm print premiered at the 2007 Ann Arbor Film Festival, which was dedicated to Helen Hill, who died that year.

== Legacy ==
In 2009, the Librarian of Congress selected Scratch and Crow for preservation in the National Film Registry, a designation reserved for American films deemed worthy of preservation for being culturally, historically, or aesthetically significant. The Library's news release stated: "Consistent with the short films she made from age 11 until her death at 36, this animated short work is filled with vivid color and a light sense of humor. It is also a poetic and spiritual homage to animals and the human soul."

== See also ==
- Independent animation
- List of American independent films
- 1995 in film

== Bibliography ==
- The 45th Ann Arbor Film Festival, printed program (2007), p. 1. Digital reproduction at . Text reproduced in Eddie Vielmetti, "Helen Hill tribute at Ann Arbor Film Festival," Vacuum (blog), March 24, 2007, .
- Chideya, Farai. "A Mardi Gras Tribute to Helen Hill," Huffington Post, April 18, 2010, .
- Pescosolido, Cristin, About HelenHill.org, .
- Davidson, Amy. "Close Look: Helen Hill," New Yorker, Jan. 8, 2010, .
- Dyess-Nugent, Phil. "Helen Hill Books Into the Library of Congress," The Phil Dyess-Nugent Experience (blog), December 30, 2009, .
- Eagan, Daniel. America's Film Legacy, 2009-2010: A Viewer's Guide to the 50 Landmark Movies (London: Bloomsbury, 2011).
- Eagan, Daniel. "Five Women Animators Who Shook Up the Industry," Smithsonian.com, June 13, 2012.
- "Michael Jackson, the Muppets and Early Cinema Tapped for Preservation in 2009 Library of Congress National Film Registry," Library of Congress news release, Dec. 30, 2009, .
- Streible, Dan. “Media Artists, Local Activists, and Outsider Archivists: The Case of Helen Hill,” in Old and New Media after Katrina, ed. Diane Negra (Palgrave, 2010), 149–74.
- The Helen Hill Collection, 1990-2006: Film Guide . Harvard Film Archive, Fine Arts Library, Harvard College Library, Harvard University, May 2011.
