= Keith Frazier (musician) =

American musician

Keith Frazier is an American musician and one of the founding members of Rebirth Brass Band.

== Career ==
In the band, Frazier plays the bass drum with a cymbal mounted on top. He plays the drum with one hand and the cymbal with the other, using a flathead screwdriver.

Keith Frazier and his brother, Phillip Frazier Rebirth Brass Band's sousaphone/tuba player), formed Rebirth Brass Band along with other band members they met at Joseph S. Clark Sr. High School in New Orleans, including renowned trumpeter, Kermit Ruffins. In Joseph S. Clark's marching and concert bands, Frazier played several brass instruments and was section leader of the baritones.

Rebirth Brass Band was discovered at the 1982 New Orleans Jazz & Heritage Festival and recorded its first studio album in 1984.

== See also ==
- Rebirth Brass Band
- HBO's Treme TV Series
