= Dinerral Shavers =

American brass band drummer and educator

- Shavers while in Europe with the Hot 8 Brass Band

Background information
- Also known as: Dick Shavers
- Born: Dinerral Jevone Shavers; March 19, 1981; New Orleans, Louisiana, U.S.
- Died: December 28, 2006 (aged 25) New Orleans, Louisiana
- Genres: Jazz
- Occupations: Musician, educator
- Formerly of: Hot 8 Brass Band

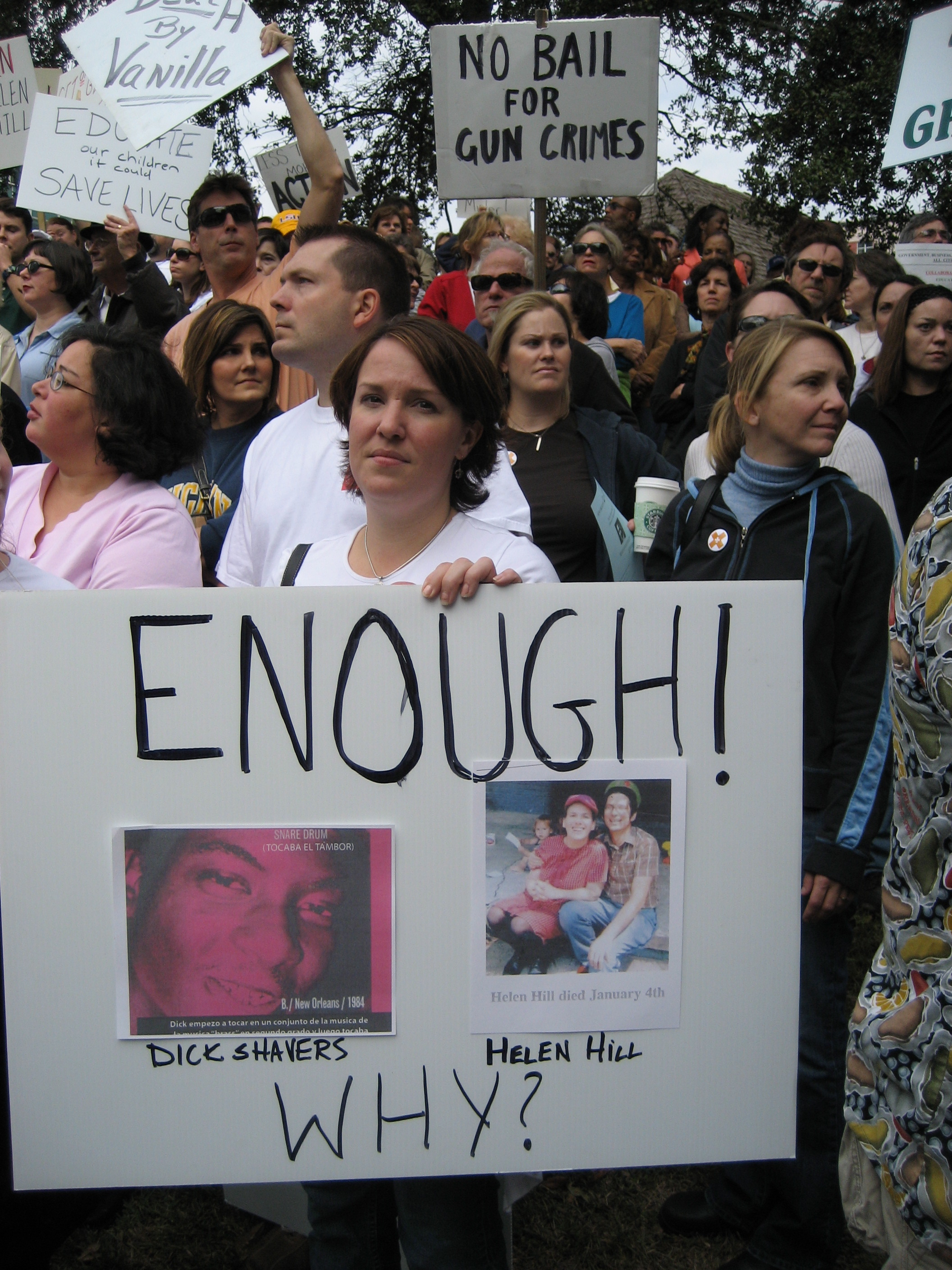
A New Orleanian holds a banner remembering Shavers and filmmaker Helen Hill at the anti-violence march on City Hall

Dinerral Jevone "Dick" Shavers (March 19, 1981 — December 28, 2006) was an American jazz drummer and educator from New Orleans, Louisiana, who was best known as a member of the Hot 8 Brass Band.

== Career ==
Shavers was a founding member of the Hot 8 Brass Band. He also taught music at L.E. Rabouin Career Magnet High School and created music programs for disadvantaged local youths. He appeared in the 2006 Spike Lee documentary film When the Levees Broke discussing the devastation of his family home in the Lower 9th Ward following Hurricane Katrina.

== Death ==
Shavers was fatally shot at around 5:30 p.m. on December 28, 2006. He had been driving his family in a black Chevrolet Malibu in the 2200 block of Dumaine Street. Although critically wounded, he continued driving four blocks up Dumaine before stopping. By 6 p.m., Shavers lay motionless on his back in the middle of the street just outside the open driver's side door. Although he was taken to a hospital he died within an hour.

It was later revealed in the Times-Picayune that Shavers was not the intended target. New Orleans Police said the teenager who shot him actually meant to kill Shavers' 15-year-old stepson in a dispute stemming from a neighborhood feud. Shavers' murder, along with a spate of other violent crimes in New Orleans within the same week (including the murder of local filmmaker Helen Hill), sparked a massive protest march on New Orleans City Hall on January 11, 2007.

== In popular culture ==
Shavers' murder by a teenager was discussed in Spike Lee's sequel documentary film If God Is Willing and Da Creek Don't Rise (2010), and it was included in the HBO series Treme, in season 2, episodes 4 and 5.
