= Hot 8 Brass Band =

American brass band

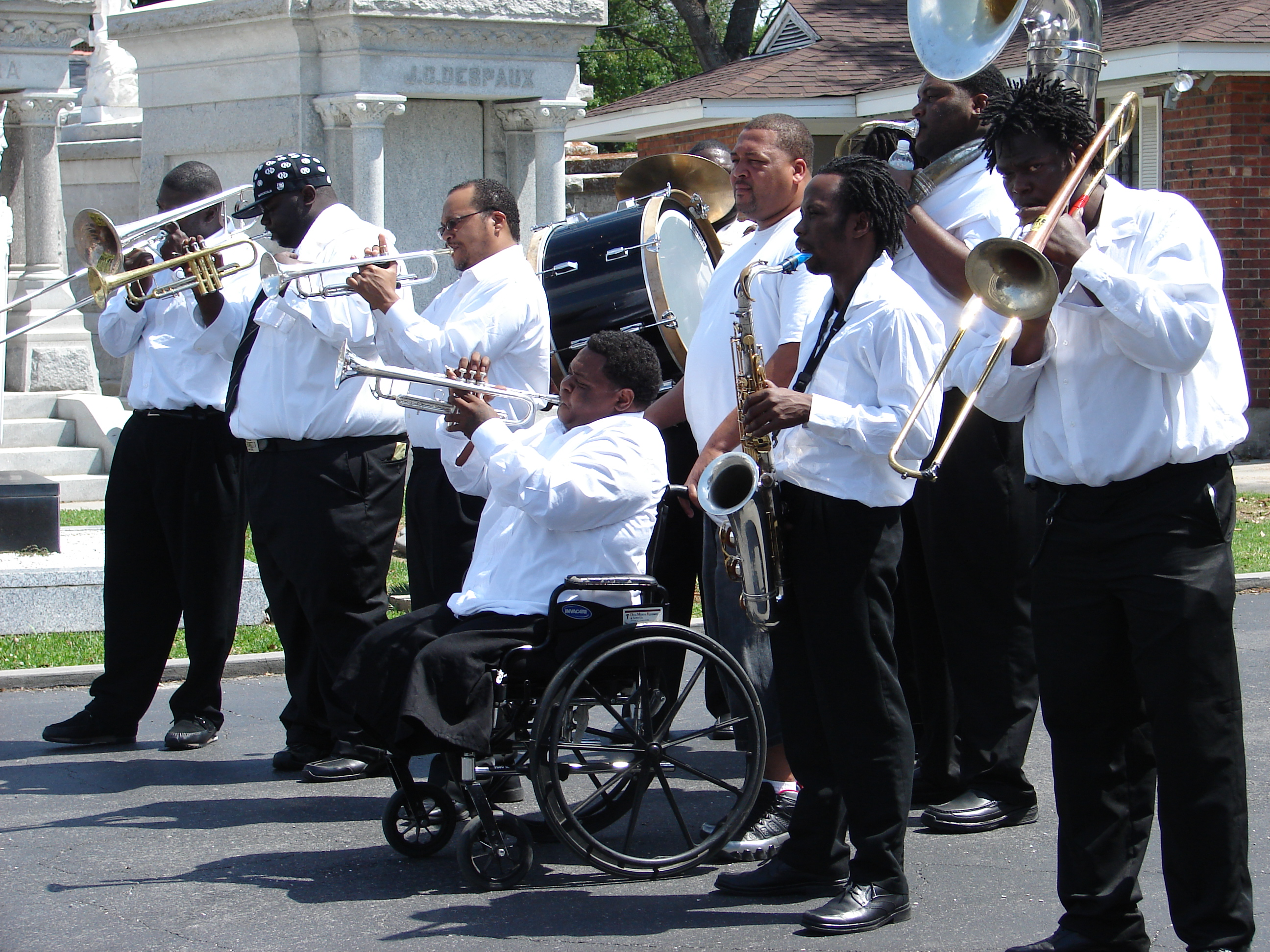
- Hot 8 playing funeral for New Orleans blogger Ashley Morris, April 2008

Background information
- Origin: New Orleans, Louisiana, U.S.
- Genres: Jazz, hip hop, funk
- Years active: 1995–present
- Label: Tru Thoughts
- Website: hot8brassband.com

The Hot 8 Brass Band is a New Orleans–based brass band which blends hip-hop, jazz and funk styles with traditional New Orleans brass sounds. It was formed by Bennie Pete, Jerome Jones, and Harry Cook in 1995. Two earlier bands merged, the Looney Tunes Brass Band and the High Steppers Brass Band.

Since June 2007, the band has been signed to Tru Thoughts, a United Kingdom label, the label's first U.S. act.

== Music ==
The Hot 8 Brass Band plays in second line parades hosted Sunday afternoons by Social Aid and Pleasure Clubs; in the New Orleans metropolitan area they also play at traditional jazz funerals and at local jazz nightclubs. They play regularly at the New Orleans Jazz & Heritage Festival and have played in the Zulu Parade, San Antonio Zulu Association Festival, the City of New Orleans New Year's Celebration and Mo' Fest, the Tom Joyner Morning Show, and the Master P music video "Hootie Hoo". The Hot 8 Brass Band has toured in Japan, Italy, France, Spain, Finland, and England.

In the wake of Hurricane Katrina, the Hot 8 Brass Band was propelled to wider prominence by an appearance in Spike Lee's 2006 documentary When the Levees Broke: A Requiem in Four Acts. Because of the appearance according to National Public Radio, "A new legion of fans caught onto the band's mix of traditional marching music, hip hop, and R&B."

In 2009, the band added its New Orleans style to an "Iko Iko" cover song of the Swiss band Schtärneföifi, who re-recorded their Swiss German version from 1995's Heicho – Ohni Znacht is Bed together with The Dixie Cups in New Orleans. The song was released on the album, Wältberüemt.

== Membership ==
Four members of the band have died since its formation. Past and present band members include:

- Bennie "Big Peter" Pete (sousaphone and band leader)
- Terrell "Burger" Batiste (trumpet)
- Harry "Swamp Thang" Cook (bass drum)
- Jerome "Baybay" Jones (trombone)
- Alvarez "B.I.G. AL" Huntley (trumpet)
- Dinerral "Dick" Shavers (snare drum)
- Raymond "Dr. Rackle" Williams (trumpet)
- Maurice "Moe" Curtis (trumpet)
- Keith "Wolf" Anderson (trombone)
- Jereau "Cousin" Fournett (trombone)
- Wendell "Cliff" Stewart (saxophone)
- Demond "Bart" Dorsey (trombone)
- Jacob Johnson (trumpet)
- Joseph "Shotgun Joe" Williams (trombone)
- Gregory "Koon" Veals (trombone)
- Derrick Tabb (snare drum)
- John "Prince" Gilbert (saxophone)
- Andrew Calhoun Jr. (saxophone)

== Discography ==
In October 2007, the band released Rock with The Hot 8, their first studio album, on the Tru Thoughts label. Hot 8 Brass Band was featured on Down in New Orleans, the 2008 album by the Blind Boys of Alabama. They released their second studio album, The Life and Times of the Hot 8 Brass Band in November 2012. In May 2013 "Tombstone" was released, the sister album to "The Life and Times...," a recording mostly dedicated to former band members, living and dead.

== Deaths of group members ==
The band has been mentioned in the U.S. media because three of its members, all of whom were between the ages of 17 and 25, over the years have died due to handgun violence. In 1996, 17-year-old trumpet player Jacob Johnson was found shot execution-style in his home. In 2004, trombone player Joseph "Shotgun Joe" Williams was shot dead by police in controversial circumstances. According to a local news source:

According to New Orleans Police Department (NOPD) accounts, officers were stopping 22-year-old trombonist Joe Williams for driving an allegedly stolen vehicle when Williams slammed the white Ford F-150 into reverse, accelerating into an NOPD squad car and officer. His actions, says Deputy Superintendent Marlin Defillo, caused officers to fear for their lives and thus open fire, killing Williams.

The same source reported that several eyewitnesses say that police shot Williams while he was unarmed and his hands were in the air.

In 2006, drummer Dinerral "Dick" Shavers was shot and killed while driving with his family. According to The Times-Picayune:

Dinerral Shavers, 25, died from a gunshot to the back of his head at about 5:30 p.m. while behind the wheel of his black Chevrolet Malibu in the 2200 block of Dumaine Street… His family was not injured… Although critically wounded, Shavers continued driving four blocks up Dumaine before stopping. By 6 p.m., Shavers lay motionless on his back in the middle of the street just outside the open driver's side door… Shavers was taken to a hospital but died within an hour.

Police said the bullet was intended for Shavers's fifteen-year-old stepson. The Hot 8 Brass Band played at Shavers' funeral. Bennie Pete died in September 2021 from complications from sarcoidosis and COVID-19.
