= Delpit (surname) =

Delpit is a French surname. Notable people with the name include:

- Albert Delpit (1849–1893), French writer born in New Orleans
- Grant Delpit (born 1998), American football player from New Orleans
- Lionel Delpit (1957–2011), American performer from New Orleans
- Lisa Delpit, American writer and education researcher from Baton Rouge
- Louise Delpit (1870s–1954), French professor at Smith College from 1908 to 1940

== See also ==
- Delpit marriage case, a controversy in 1890s Québec
- Delpy
