= John Sprott Archibald =

Canadian judge

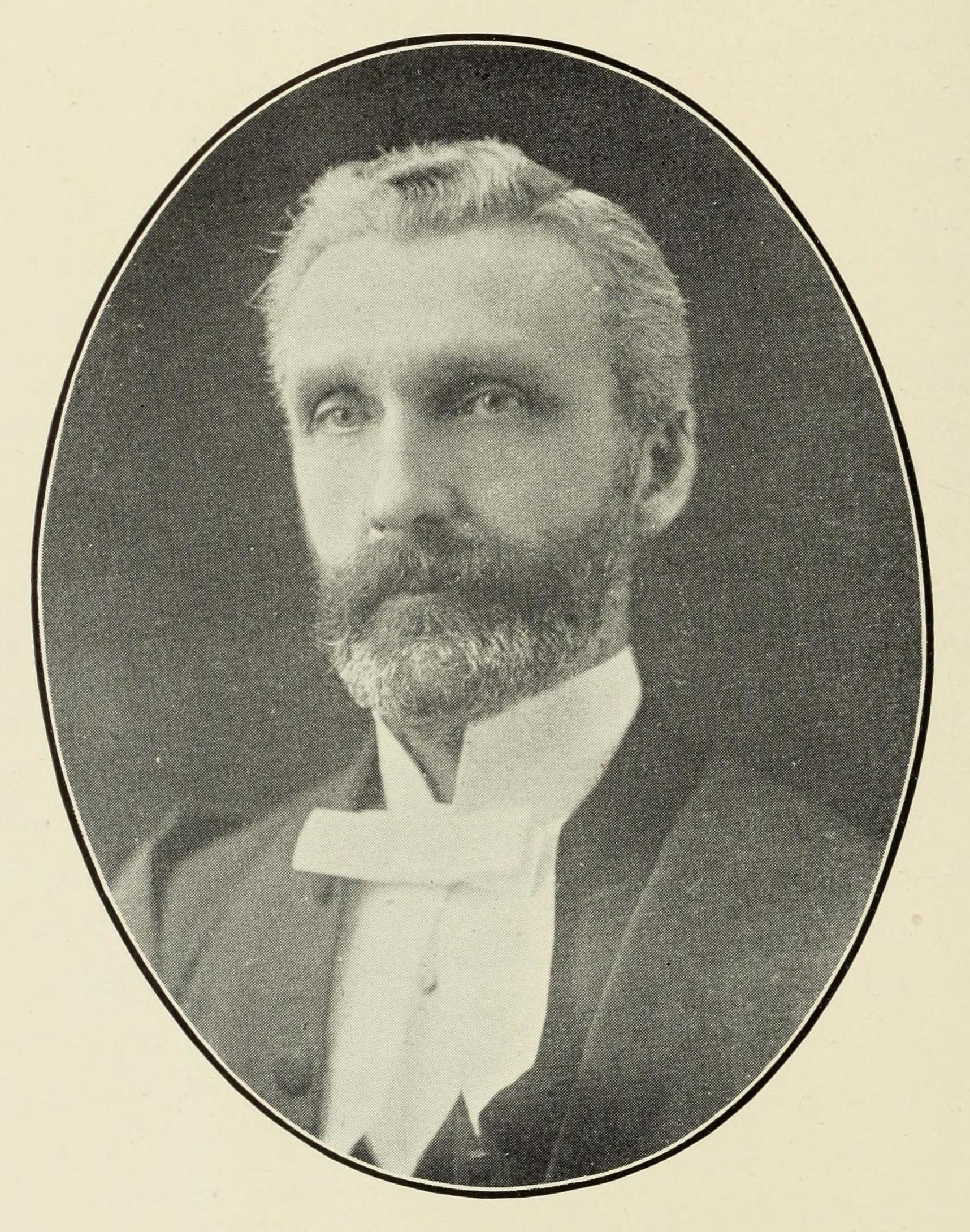
- John Sprott Archibald circa 1903
- Born: September 8, 1843
- Died: January 16, 1932; Montreal
- Education: McGill University (BA, BCL, MA, DCL)

John Sprott Archibald (September 8, 1843 – January 16, 1932) was a Canadian judge. Born in Nova Scotia, Archibald moved to Montreal, Canada East, in 1864 and attended McGill University. He was called to the bar of Quebec in 1871, practising and teaching law at McGill thereafter. He was a Montreal alderman from 1884 to 1890. Archibald was appointed to the Superior Court of Quebec in 1893, retiring in 1922.

== Early life and education ==
John Sprott Archibald was born in Musquodoboit, Nova Scotia (likely Musquodoboit Harbour) on September 8, 1843, the son of William Archibald, a farmer, and Nancy Archibald (his cousin). His family had lived in Nova Scotia since 1750.

Archibald attended a Presbyterian seminary in Truro, Nova Scotia. He moved to Montreal in 1864. He graduated from McGill University with a BA in 1867, winning the Prince of Wales Gold Medal; and a BCL in 1870, winning the Elizabeth Torrance Gold Medal. He later received an MA (1877) and a DCL (1887), also from McGill.

== Career ==
Archibald articled under John A. Perkins and was called to the bar of Quebec on January 18, 1871. He practised alone and in partnership with lawyers including W. W. Lynch, who was Quebec's solicitor general; and George G. Foster. Archibald was named a queen's counsel in 1887. He was appointed as a lecturer in criminal law at McGill in 1871 and was named a professor in 1880. He later became a professor of criminal law, which position he retained until he became a governor of the university in 1894. He also taught constitutional law at McGill.

He was an alderman of Montreal from 1884 until 1890. He was also appointed a revising officer under the Electoral Franchise Act, which office he retained until the statute was repealed. He represented the government of Canada before the royal commission appointed to investigate corruption charges alleging that Adolphe-Philippe Caron had funnelled subsidies into Conservative Party coffers.

He was appointed a puisne judge of the Superior Court of Quebec on November 22, 1893. He delivered judgments in cases including Johnson v Sparrow, in which he awarded damages in favour of a Black couple that was prevented from sitting in the audience at the Montreal Academy of Music; and Delpit v Côté. He retired from the superior court on October 7, 1922.

== Personal life ==
He married Ellen Hutchinson of Bluevale, Ontario, on July 13, 1871. They had five children. Archibald died on January 16, 1932, in Montreal.
