= Indian Red =

Traditional Mardi Gras Indians chant

Indian Red is traditionally sung at the beginning and at the end of gatherings of Mardi Gras Indians in New Orleans. It is a traditional chant that may have been first recorded in 1947 by Danny Barker for King Zulu label (Barker on guitar & vocals, Don Kirkpatrick on piano, Heywood Henry on baritone saxophone, and Freddie Moore). It has since been recorded many times by, among others, Dr. John and Wild Tchoupitoulas.

== Lyrics ==
Madi cu defio, en dans dey, end dans day
Madi cu defio, en dans dey, end dans day

We are the Indians, Indians, Indians of the nation
The wild, wild creation
We won't bow down
Down on the ground
Oh how I love to hear him call Indian Red

I've got a Big Chief, Big Chief, Big Chief of the Nation
The wild, wild creation
He won't bow down
Down on the ground
Oh how I love to hear him call Indian Red
