= Delpy =

Delpy is a surname. Notable people with the surname include:

- Albert Delpy (born 1941), French actor and writer
- David Delpy (born 1948), British bioengineer
- Hippolyte Camille Delpy (1842–1910), French painter
- Julie Delpy (born 1969), French-American actress, director, screenwriter, and singer-songwriter

== See also ==
- Delpit (surname)
