= Backstreet Cultural Museum =

Museum in New Orleans, Louisiana

- BCM
- A Powerhouse of Knowledge

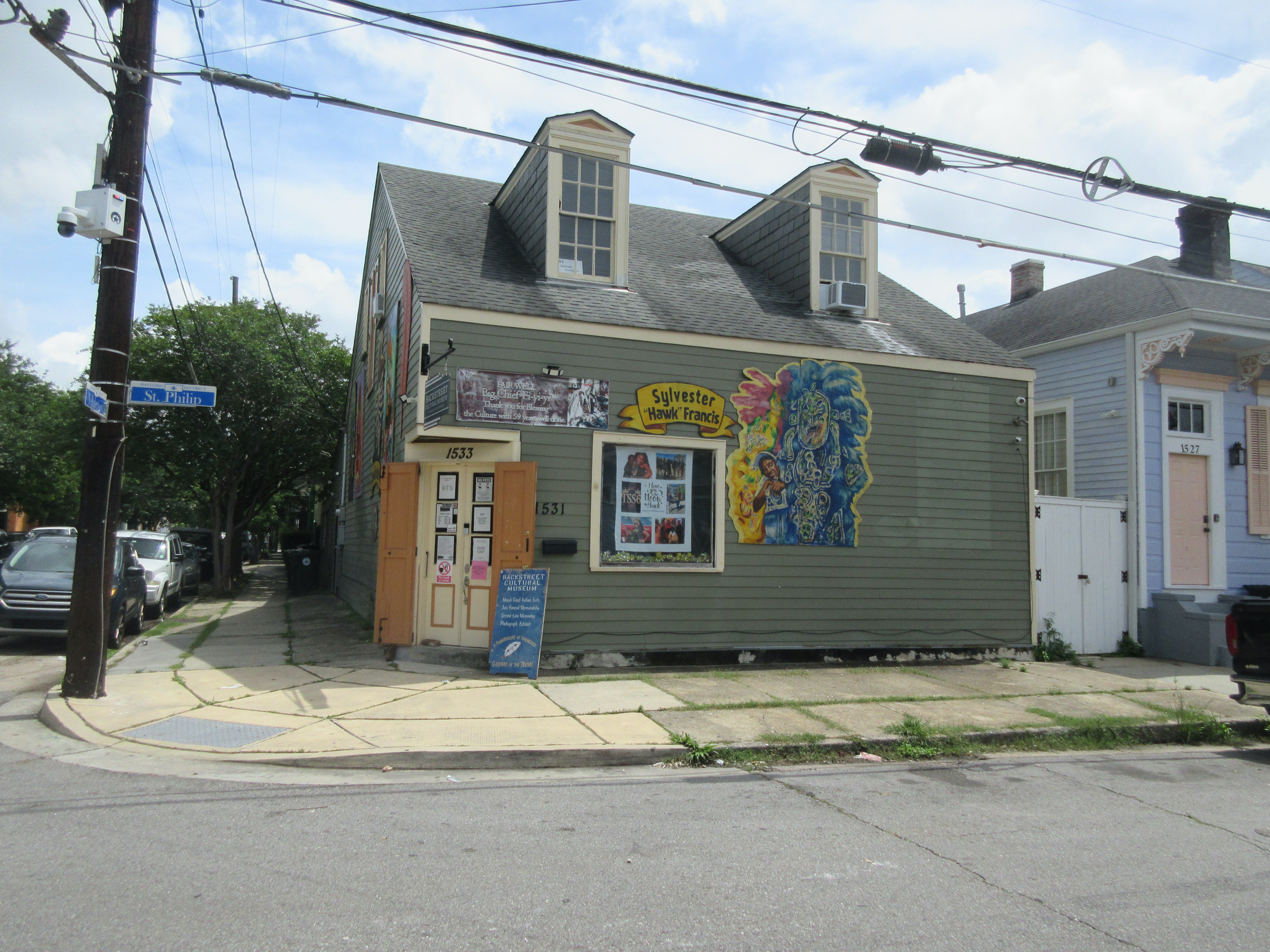
- St. Philip Street museum building, 2026
- Established: 1988 (Garage exhibit); 1999 (Formally incorporated)
- Location: 1531 St. Philip Street; New Orleans, Louisiana 70116
- Coordinates: 29.9658437°N 90.0726904°W
- Type: African-American culture
- Collections: Jazz funerals, Mardi Gras Indians, and second line parades
- Founder: Sylvester "Hawk" Francis
- Website: www.backstreetmuseum.org

The Backstreet Cultural Museum is a museum in New Orleans, Louisiana's Tremé neighborhood, founded by Sylvester "Hawk" Hawkins.

== Museum ==
The museum's collections include objects relating to the African American culture of New Orleans with a special emphasis on jazz funerals, Mardi Gras Indians, and second line parades sponsored by Social Aid and Pleasure Clubs. The museum contains many artifacts of African-American culture in New Orleans, including elaborate, brightly colored suits worn by Mardi Gras Indians in previous years, and rare photos of Mardi Gras Indian "gangs" from the 1940s.

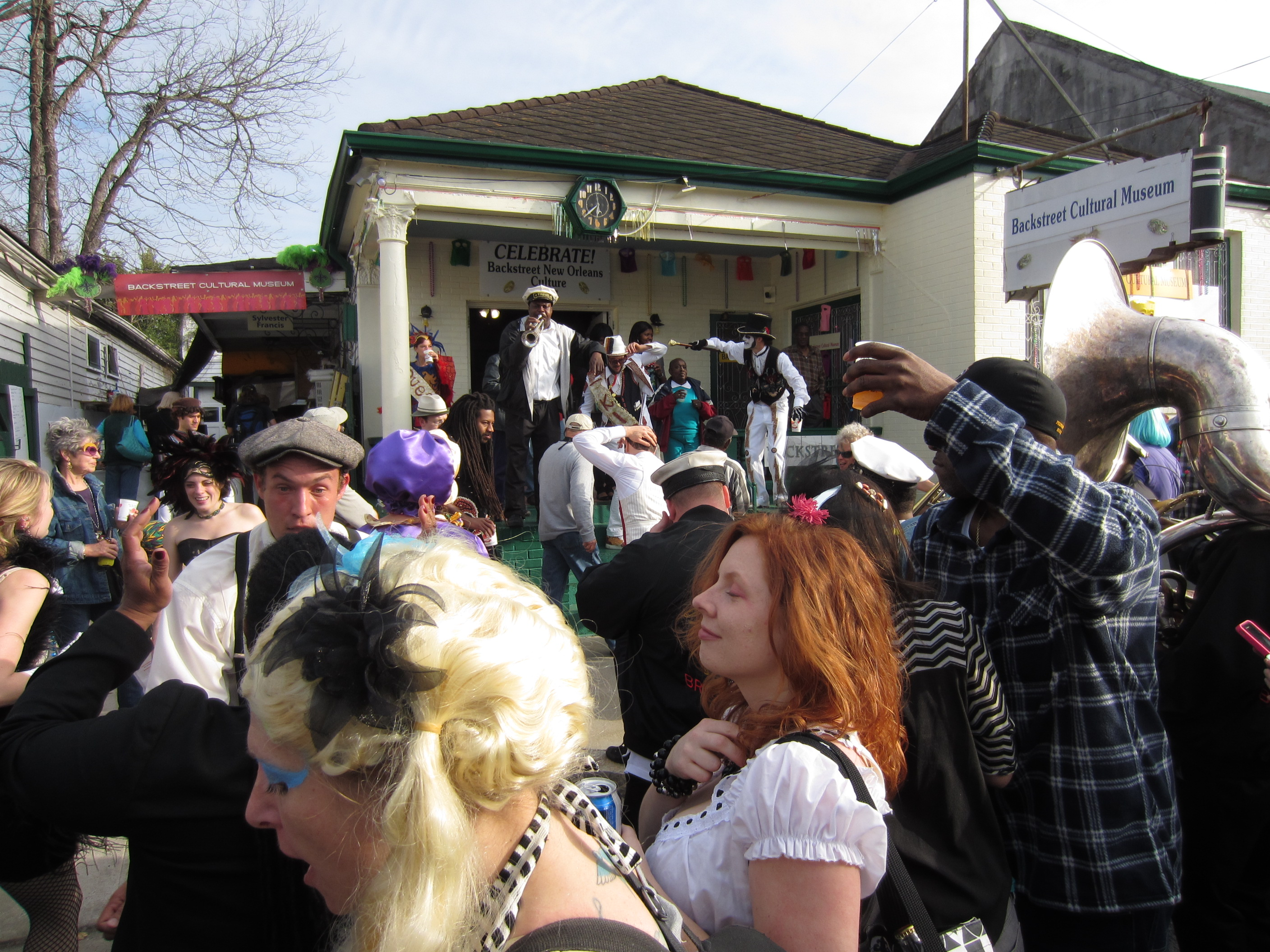
Mardi Gras at Deslile Street location, 2012

The museum is also a clearing house for information about Mardi Gras Indian and second-line events and serves as the location for some events, including the annual White Buffalo Day ceremony and procession that goes to Congo Square.

The museum was originally located informally in Francis' garage but relocated in a former funeral home building at 1116 St. Claude Street (renamed Henriette Deslile Street in late 2011). The building was damaged by Hurricane Ida at the end of August 2021. In July 2022, the museum moved to a new location a few blocks away on St. Philip Street in the former Kermit Ruffins' Jazz & Blues Hall building.

As of July 12, 2022, the hours are 10 am to 4 pm, and general admission to the museum is by a donation of $20 (referred to as a "cover charge"). As in many other museums, videos inside are prohibited but limited photography is allowed.

== See also ==
- List of museums in Louisiana
- List of museums focused on African Americans
