= Mardi Gras Indians =

African-American carnival subculture in New Orleans

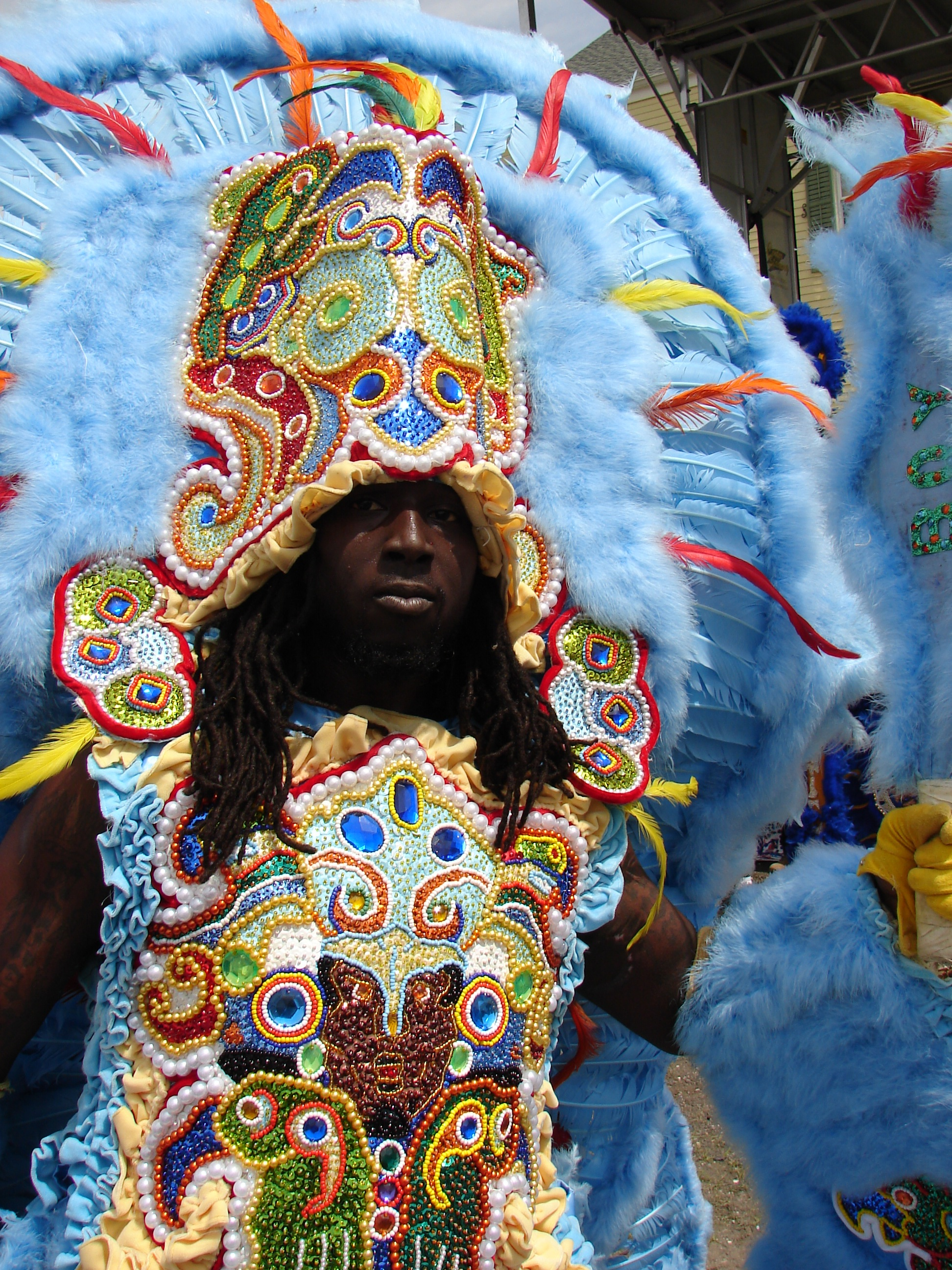
Mardi Gras Indians at Algiers Riverfest New Orleans 2009 showing their beadwork

The Mardi Gras Indians (also known as Black Masking Indians or Black Maskers) (Note: Most Mardi Gras Indians prefer to identify with their group affiliations, rather than as "Mardi Gras Indians" or "Black Masking Indians". Group terminology varies between individuals, with other terms such as Black Indians or Black Masking Mardi Gras Indians also used.) are Black American Carnival revelers in New Orleans, Louisiana, known for their elaborate suits and participation in Mardi Gras. The Mardi Gras Indians subculture emerged during the late 1800s, founded by Becate Batiste during segregation as a blend of Black American and Native American cultural practices. The Mardi Gras Indians' tradition is created in New Orleans by Black Americans, and is a Creole and Black American artform exclusive to New Orleans.

The Mardi Gras Indian tradition developed as a form of cultural resistance when Black Americans were not allowed to partake in Mardi Gras celebrations in certain areas and as a way to pay homage to Native Americans who assisted Black Americans by taking them into tribes due to them being runaway slaves. Black people could not gather in public or wear masks. Their aesthetic serves as an expression of their culture, creativity, and Black American heritage. The tradition of "masking" derives from the Native American customs and practices in which an individual interacts with other tribes and chiefs. Mardi Gras Indians mask as the Native American allies who shielded their ancestors during slavery; some suits members incorporate depictions of orisha spirits from the Yoruba religion, or as spirits of the dead, such as the Skull and Bones gangs, though not a Mardi Gras Indian tribe. Mardi Gras Indians' suits (regalia) and performances provide commentary on social justice issues, political liberation, and transformation. Their ceremonial purposes include celebrations, pageantry, and community and tribal solidarity.

Mardi Gras Indians describe themselves by "tribes" or "gangs", which are a reflection of the Native American tribes they mask as. Tribes take their names from street names, ancestry and important cultural figures. There are more than 40 active tribes, which range in size from half a dozen to several dozen members. Groups are largely independent, but a pair of umbrella organizations loosely coordinates the Uptown Indians and the Downtown Indians. Their suits are displayed in museums in Louisiana and the Smithsonian. The complex designs of these suits are unique to the Mardi Gras Indian artistic community.

In addition to Mardi Gras Day, many of the tribes also parade on Saint Joseph's Day (March 19) and the Sunday nearest to Saint Joseph's Day ("Super Sunday"). Traditionally, these were the only times Mardi Gras Indians were seen in public in full regalia. The New Orleans Jazz & Heritage Festival began the practice of hiring tribes to appear at the Festival as well. In recent years, it has become more common to see Mardi Gras Indians at other festivals and parades in the city. According to Joyce Marie Jackson of Tulane University, the Mardi Gras Indians' fusion of American Indian and West African motifs and music creates "a folk ritual and street theater unique to New Orleans".

== History ==
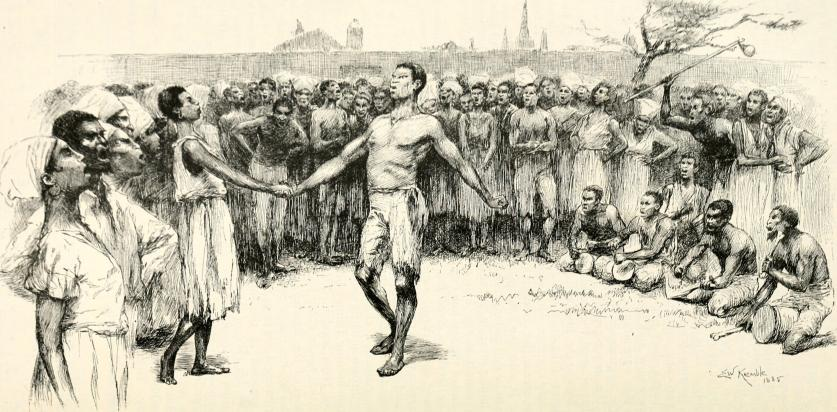
Dancing in Congo Square, 1886

Mardi Gras Indians have been practicing their traditions in New Orleans since at least the 18th century. The city of New Orleans was founded by the French in 1718, on land inhabited by the Chitimacha Tribe, and within the first decade 5,000 enslaved Africans were trafficked to the colony. (Note: The first enslaved Africans arrived in 1719, and the city quickly became a hub of the slave trade.) The West and Central African ethnic groups taken to Louisiana during the transatlantic slave trade were largely from Bambara, Gambian, Akan, and Kongo peoples. From 1719 to 1743, the largest group came from Senegambia, and the second largest group came from the Kingdom of Kongo. These ethnic groups influenced the culture of Louisiana in food, music, language, religion, and decorative aesthetics. French slaveholders allowed enslaved and free Black people to congregate on Sunday afternoons at Congo Square, where they performed music and religious practices.

New Orleans is known for its Creole heritage, with traditions coming from Native Americans, Africans, and Europeans. A mixed-race population of free people of color contributed to the history and culture of Mardi Gras in the city. The culture of enslaved Africans fused with Afro-Caribbean, Native American and European cultures that syncretized at Congo Square and was practiced during Mardi Gras. The Mardi Gras Indian tradition developed from early encounters between the region's Indigenous (likely Chitimacha) and Black communities. Most of the enslaved people in Louisiana were Black, but 20% of enslaved people were either Native or mixed-race Afro-Indigenous people before abolition.

=== Black–Indigenous alliances ===
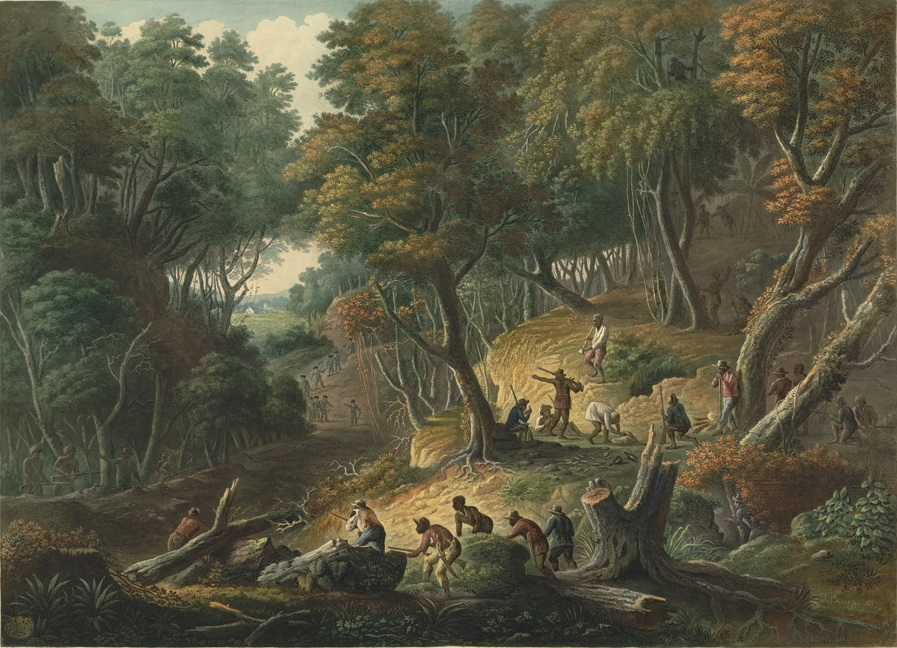
Maroons preparing to ambush a convoy

When enslaved Africans escaped, they encountered Indigenous peoples of Louisiana who shared skills and resources with them. New Orleans was surrounded by swamps, bayous, and rivers where a number of maroon settlements formed. In Louisiana, the Underground Railroad went southward to the maroon camps because the northern free territories and Canada were too far away. These maroon camps attacked whites, stole cattle from nearby farms for food, and freed or absorbed other enslaved people. The maroons lived in huts and grew their own corn, squash, rice, and herbs. African culture thrived in maroon communities, and Native Americans often helped them by providing food and weapons so they could defend themselves from slave catchers and other whites.

In colonial Louisiana, there was a settlement of armed maroons and Indigenous peoples known as Natanapalle. In such spaces, freed and escaped Africans adapted some of the culture of Native Americans. Whites in Louisiana feared an alliance of Africans and Indigenous people.

In 1729, during the Natchez Revolt, 280 enslaved Africans joined forces with Natchez people to prevent French colonists from taking Indigenous land for tobacco production. The Natchez killed almost all of the 150 Frenchmen at Fort Rosalie; only about 20 managed to escape, some fleeing to New Orleans. The Natchez spared the enslaved Africans, perhaps due to a sense of affinity between the groups. Some slaves joined the Natchez, while others took the opportunity to escape to freedom.

Until the mid-1760s, maroon colonies lined the shores of Lake Borgne, just downriver from New Orleans. The maroons controlled many of the canals and back-country passages from Lake Pontchartrain to the Gulf of Mexico, including the Rigolets. The San Malo community was a long-thriving autonomous community. These settlements were eventually eradicated by Spanish militia led by Francisco Bouligny. Despite this, people who escaped enslavement in ante-bellum America continued to find refuge and freedom in the areas around New Orleans.

=== The first Mardi Gras ===
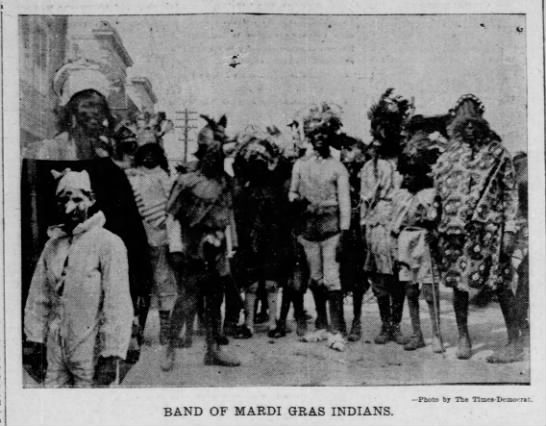
"A Band of Mardi Gras Indians" - New Orleans 1903

The first recorded slave dances on plantations in Louisiana were recorded by the French in 1732. Archival records documented the first enslaved Africans apparently dressing as Indigenous people in a celebratory dance called Mardi Gras in 1746. In 1771, free men of color held Mardi Gras in maroon camps and in the city's back areas. Some of these men wore their masks to balls, causing the Spanish administration to prohibit Black people from attending the balls or from wearing masks and feathers. As a result, Black revelers confined their parades and celebrations to Congo Square and Black neighborhoods. Author and photographer Michael P. Smith quotes Brassea as stating: "By 1781, under Spanish rule, the attorney general warned the City Commission of problems arising from 'a great number of free negroes and slaves who, with the pretext of the Carnival season, mask and mix in bands passing through the streets looking for the dance-halls.'" In 1804 and 1813, a German American and Swiss traveler saw Black men dressed in "oriental" and Native American attire wearing Turkish turbans of various colors.

In the late 18th century, Spanish officials increased immigration and trade in the lower Mississippi valley by granting French merchants permission to transport enslaved people from Saint-Domingue and other Caribbean islands. American merchants in New Orleans invested in capital by transporting enslaved people through the port from the colonies of the British West Indies, such as Jamaica. After the abolition of the transatlantic slave trade in 1807, the port of New Orleans became the center of the slave trade in the United States before the American Civil War. Enslaved people were brought from other southern states to supply the demand for labor on the plantations. In addition, during and after the Haitian Revolution, enslavers fled the island of Hispaniola, bringing their enslaved Africans with them to New Orleans.

In 1810, White Creoles, free Mixed Race Creoles and their enslaved came to New Orleans from Saint Domingue now known as Haiti, thus doubling the local enslaved population and tripling the population of free people of color. The port received immigrants from Cuba, Germany, Ireland, and the rest of Europe and the Caribbean that migrated all throughout the United States. Carnival culture, stemming from European lent customs was seen to exist not just in New Orleans, but also in Haiti, Jamaica and other parts of the West Indies these festival traditions have been customary in certain Black countries and local communities. Jonkonnu, Rara, Gaga, Canboulet, and others are festival traditions in the West Indies.

=== Exclusion and subversion ===
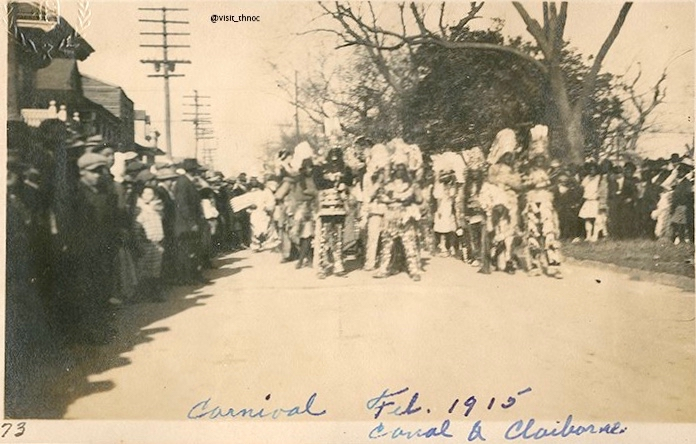
New Orleans Mardi Gras Indians, 1915

In 1857, The Pickwick Club, an all-white gentleman's club, formed the Mystick Krewe of Comus, a white-only carnival krewe. They were soon followed by similar all-white, men-only krewes across the city. These groups often wore blackface and redface, and took part in public celebrations as well as private balls. Black people were initially forbidden from wearing masks during carnival; in response, groups of young Black men used "war paint" to hide their identities instead. After the state legislature allowed masking "from sunrise to sunset", Black people began masking according to the style of Native American ceremonies.

By the 1880s, Becate Batiste, a young creole man of African, French and Choctaw heritage formed the Creole Wild West, in Seventh Ward. Others soon formed their own "tribes". Their visual style, drawing from African and Indigenous traditions, served to satirize and invert the racist masquerades of white krewes. It also allowed Black people, whose African culture had been suppressed by slave laws and the Code Noir, to practice their traditions openly.

=== Hurricane Katrina ===
In 2005, Hurricane Katrina destroyed African-American neighborhoods in New Orleans. Tremé is considered to be the oldest Black neighborhood in America and during post-Katrina continues to experience gentrification. From the 18th and 19th centuries, free Black people owned businesses and mixed with Louisiana Creoles at Tremé. It is estimated that Black people owned eighty percent of the neighborhood. After Hurricane Katrina passed through, over 1,000 Black households along Clairborne Avenue were wiped-out and replaced with 120 white households. According to research from author Shearon Roberts, the changing of racial demographics in post-Katrina affects the continuation of culture for some Black residents. Occupation by white residents of spaces that were once Black-owned and where Black masking and cultural traditions were perpetuated resulted in three consequences: "...economic loss through appropriation, increased forms of criminalization, and the rupturing of Black safe communal spaces." Black New Orleanians experience cultural intrusion and appropriation from outsiders that affects the meaning and history of their traditions.

== Culture ==
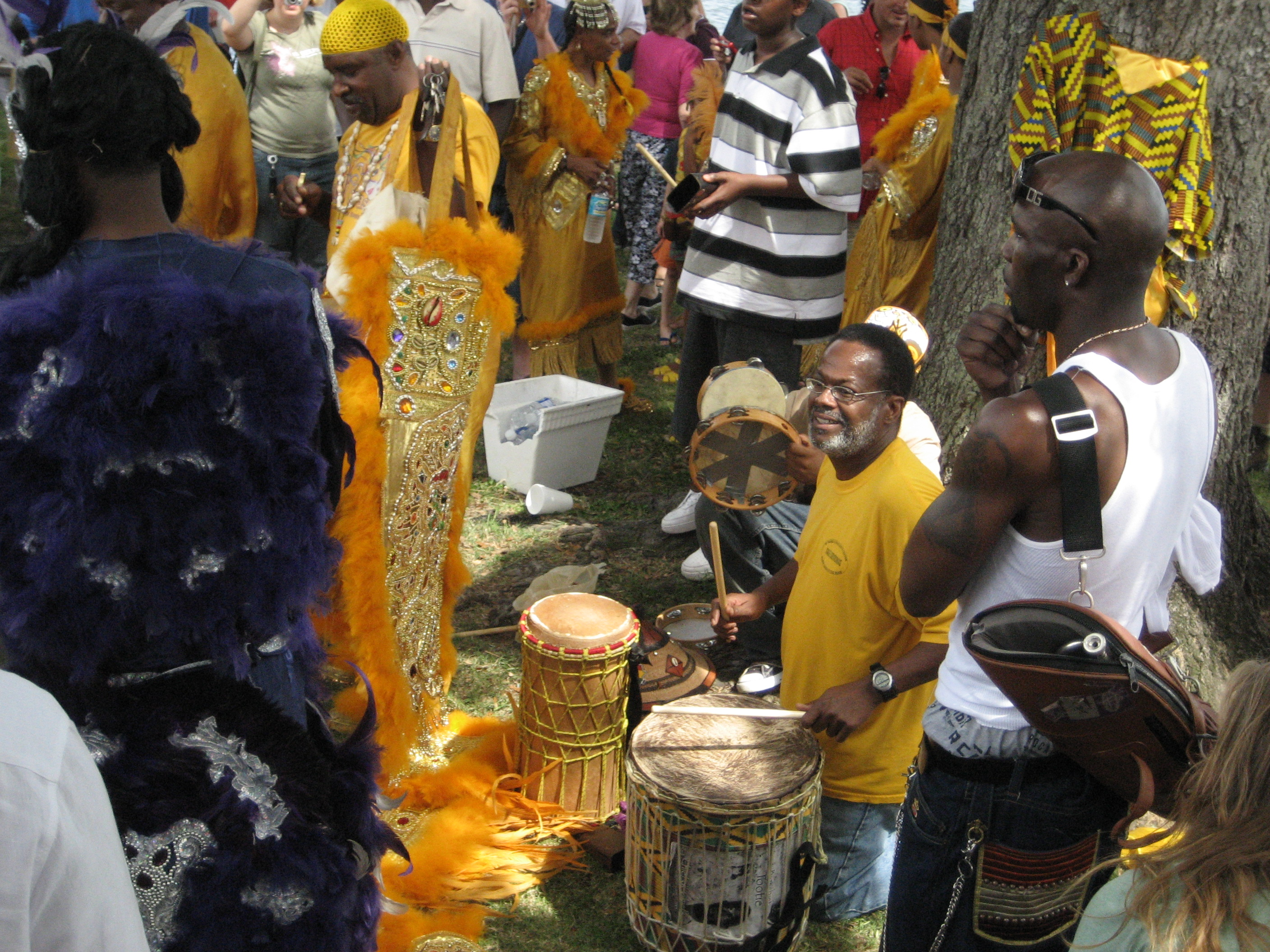
Mardi Gras Indians in 2007 play music using African drums and tambourines on "Super Sunday".

Experts generally agree that Mardi Gras Indian culture is a combination of African, Caribbean, Indigenous, and European influences, which underwent a process of creolization and syncretism in New Orleans. For instance, the beadwork, drumbeats, and aprons worn by Mardi Gras Indians resembles the cultures of West and Central Africa. The masking of the Mardi Gras Indians resembles West African masquerade ceremonies and warrior dances, but also draws on Indigenous motifs. The closest comparisons are between Caribbean carnival cultures—some scholars have even suggested New Orleans should be considered part of the pan-Caribbean region because of its shared heritage. (Note: "The origins of this tradition, which has striking parallels in the Caribbean, especially in Trinidad, have yet to be conclusively documented. The 'Indian' tradition is also cited as another instance of New Orleans' status as the northern frontier of Caribbean culture.")

Black masking traditions were sustained by African Americans despite colonialism, slavery, Black Codes, and racism. (Note: Harrison-Nelson notes the similar cultural practices of Mardi Gras Indians and West Africans in the music, polyrhythms, and regalia. She says: "I would say this tradition is an African-American community neighborhood-based tradition that often uses a Native American motif, which includes the feather headdresses and beadwork. But basically, everything else about it is West African.") After the French required Black people to convert to Catholicism, African and Christian religious traditions were combined to continue traditional practices from African religions without notice. For enslaved and free Africans in the Americas, this included singing, dancing, drumming, and wearing masks and costumes at carnival. In New Orleans early history, African culture resembled the all-male West African secret masquerade societies practiced among the Igbo and Yoruba. As Black people continued to practice their traditional cultures, they also incorporated Native American and Caribbean elements, in turn creating the diverse Black masking carnival traditions in the diaspora and in New Orleans.

Scholars Fehintola Mosadomi and Joyce M. Jackson noted similar ceremonial practices of the Yoruba Egungun and Mardi Gras Indians—both are performed in the streets with music and folk rituals, have elaborate colorful costumes, and are male-dominated. Masking Indian culture is a rite of passage for Black men and provides manhood and comrade training. Women's role in the tradition was, historically, as embellishment, (Note: Harrison-Nelson continues, "If the chief is pretty, he's prettier with a queen standing next to him.") but over the years, women began to participate too.

Black people in the African diaspora have traditionally used masquerade carnivals to protest oppression. Black carnivals provide a space for Africans Americans to unite, free from exploitation by white Americans. Mardi Gras Indian culture is a form of Black creative resistance to the white supremacy of colonialism and represents a rejection of white carnival norms. (Note: "While masquerading is reminiscent of the communal sociopolitical structures in precolonial Africa, the African Diaspora masked carnivals challenged the political powers and interests of the dominant White elite.”)

=== Language ===
Mardi Gras Indians today have their own secret coded symbols, songs and language only initiates within the community know. In the 19th century, Creole dialects developed differently within each neighborhood because of the diversity of Native languages spoken, each having its own syntax and phonetics. This contributed to a diversity of coded dialects sung by Black masking Indians.

=== Music ===
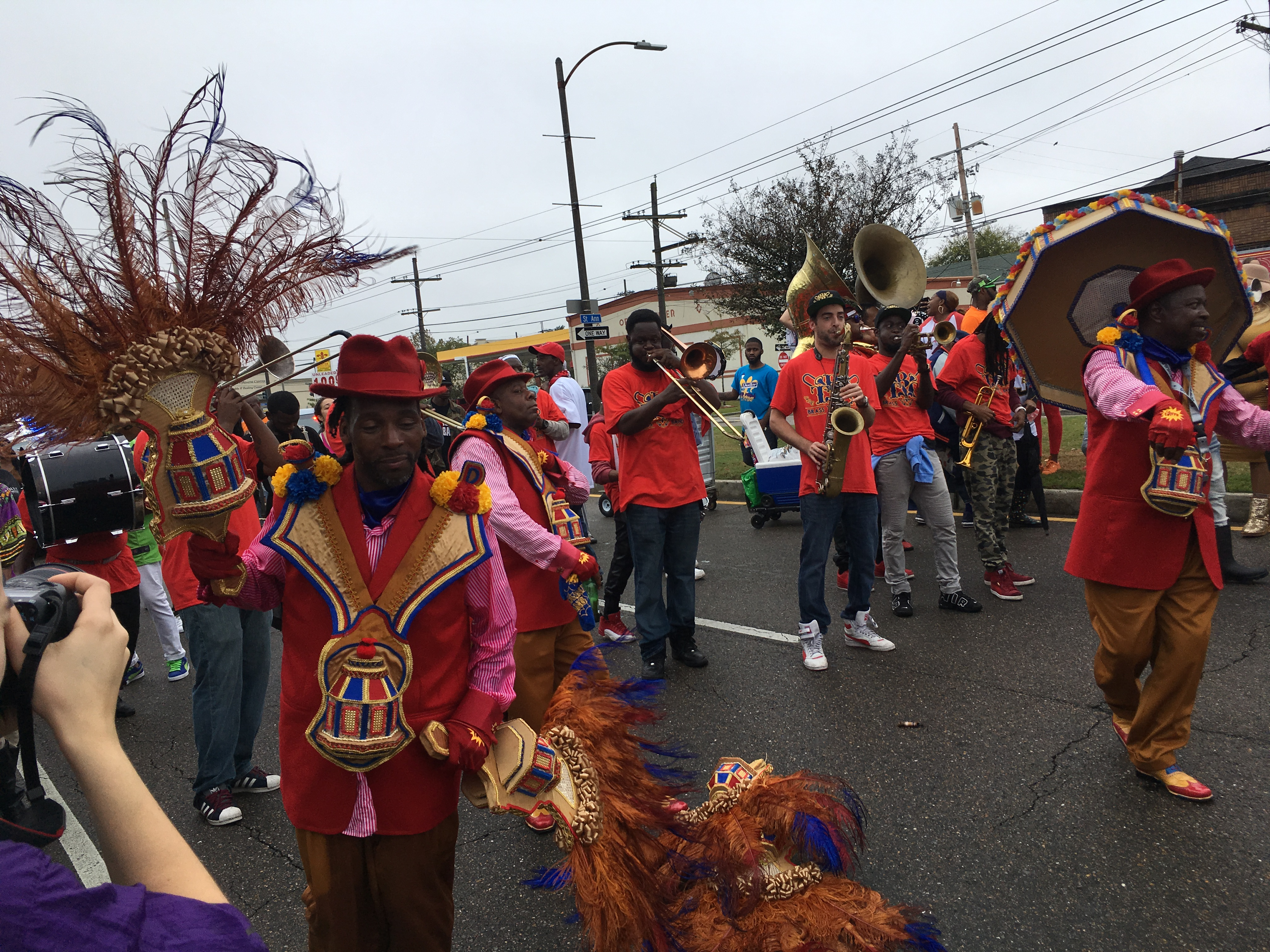
Second line in New Orleans

Mardi Gras Indian music and dance is informed by the Black New Orleanian experience. In 1740, New Orleans' Congo Square was a cultural center for African music and dance; the city was also a major southern trade port that became a cultural melting pot. On Sundays, enslaved African people gathered to sing folk songs, play traditional music, and dance. The lively parties were recounted by a Northern observer as being "indescribable ... Never will you see gayer countenances, demonstrations of more forgetfulness of the past and the future, and more entire abandonment to the joyous existence of the present moment."

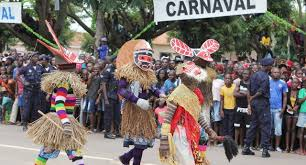
The image demonstrates the Angolan culture and the way of dressing. According to historian Jeroen Dewulf, Kongolese Central African dress and music influenced by the Mardi Gras Indians.

On these occasions, Mardi Gras Indians would play traditional music using belled wrists and ankle bands, congas, and tambourines. The music of Mardi Gras Indians played at Congo square contributed to the creation of jazz. Some Mardi Gras Indian music is derived from African polyrhythms and syncopated beats combined with Native and Creole languages, and French and European musical influences. These Africans rhythms, such as the Bamboula, have been continued to this day. (Note: Charles Siler says: "The Mardi Gras Indians also retained the Bamboula, which describes a drumbeat and dance. For nearly one hundred and twenty years the Bamboula, associated with Louisiana Congo Square legacy, was kept intact within that tradition.") The traditional New Orleans Black masking Indian song Iko Iko, which emerged around this time, is believed to derive from a combination of the Native American Choctaw and Chickasaw languages, Louisiana Creole, French, and West African languages.

Black Masking Indian parades typically have a "second line" of street performers and revelers with brass instruments and drums. These second line brass bands often attend local jazz funerals to play for the funeral procession. Historian Richard Brent Turner says that Central African cultures from Bakongo peoples, Haitian carnivals, and African-American culture which blended at Congo Square are expressed in the Mardi Gras Indians' regalia and music. Mardi Gras Indian musicians include the funk band Cha Wa, singer and "Big Chief" Monk Boudreau, and The Wild Tchoupitoulas.

=== Spirituality ===
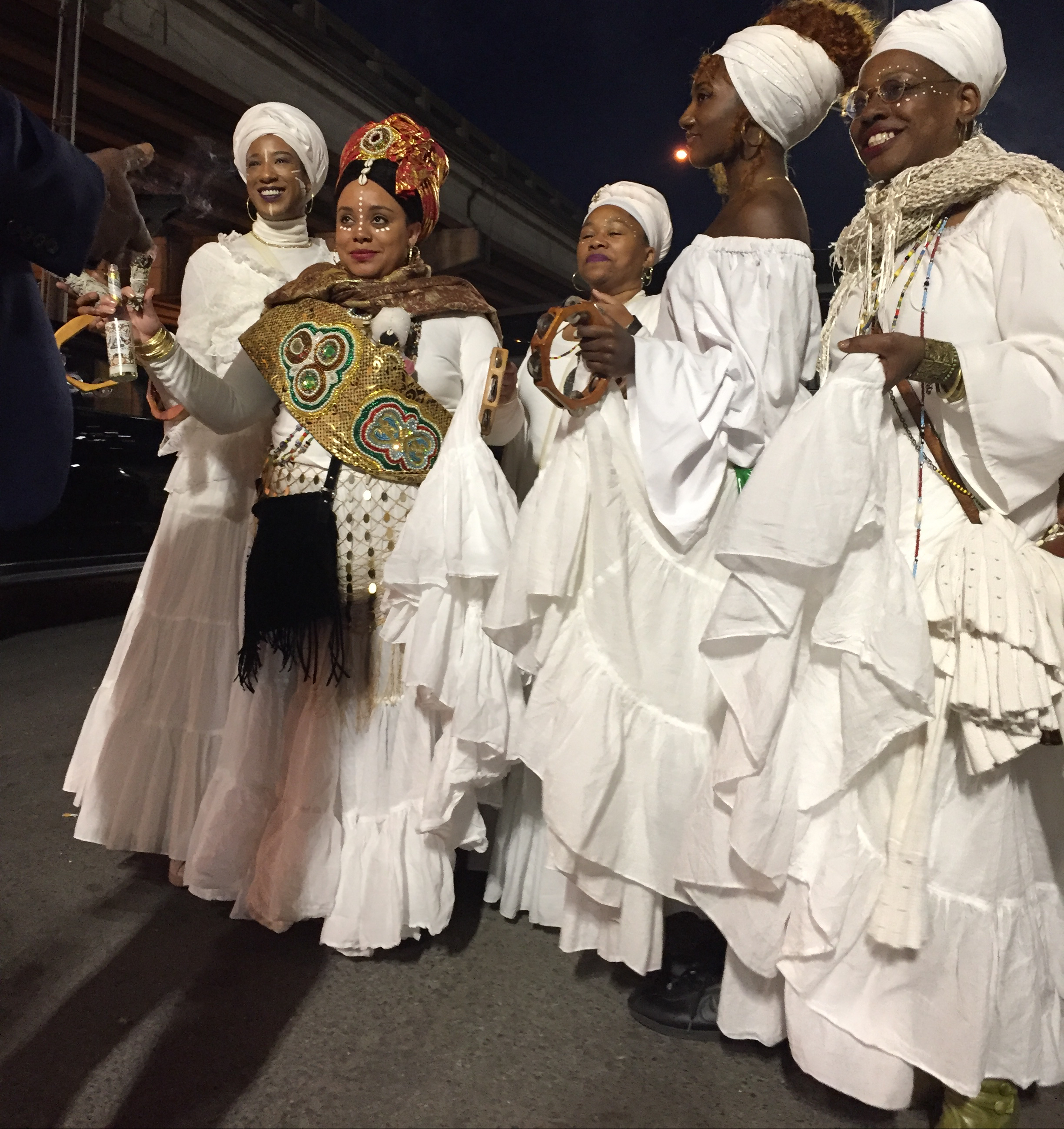
Louisiana Voodoo beliefs and rituals are intertwined with Black Mardi Gras masking traditions.

The Code Noir in French colonies banned all non-Catholic religions and required enslaved and free people to convert to Catholicism. Curator and author Paulette Richards suggests that masquerade performances in the Black Atlantic during and after slavery, in which African and Christian religious traditions were combined, were a way for African peoples in the Americas to continue honoring their ancestral spirits after colonial officials had banned Black people from practicing African religions. Many maskers describe masking as aiming "to enter the spirit world of possession". During jazz funerals, spirits control the bodies of the dancers so the spirit of the deceased can transition peacefully. During Mardi Gras, the masks symbolize spirituality and freedom.

Mardi Gras Indians often form second lines for jazz funerals in Black neighborhoods, marching behind the coffin and mourners. The music is typically somber when they head to church, but becomes celebratory when leaving the church. These funerals feature African customs such as intense drumming, dancing, and call-and-response. Similar funeral processions are seen in West African, Afro-Caribbean, and Afro-Brazilian communities. Mardi Gras Indians also perform healing rituals during their street performances to unite and heal communities.

Before a Mardi Gras Indian observance begins a prayer or chant is said in Louisiana Creole. The song Madi cu defio, en dans day is sung; it is a corruption of a Louisiana Voodoo Creole song, M'alle couri dans deser, that song is also associated with the Afro-Caribbean dance called Calinda. Calinda (or Kalinda) developed in the Caribbean, and was brought to New Orleans by enslaved people from San Domingo and the Antilles. In New Orleans, Calinda became "the dance of Congo Square", a place known for its Mardi Gras Indian traditions.

==== Spiritual church movement ====
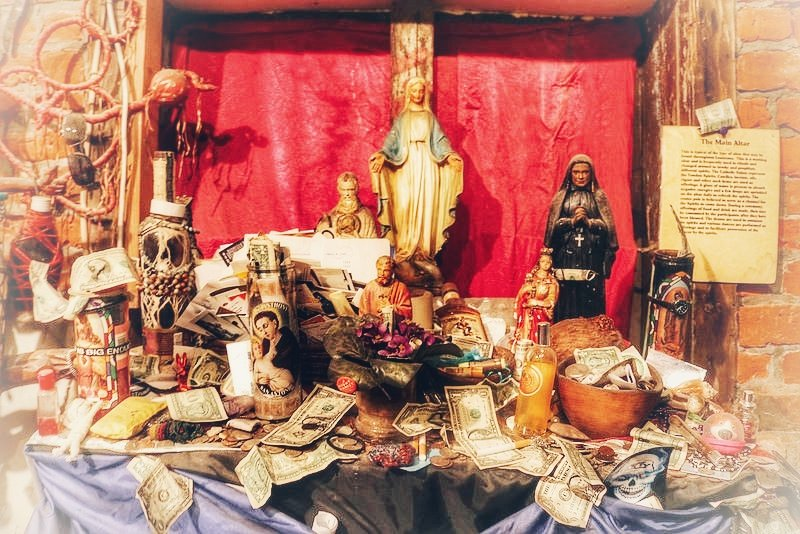
The Voodoo religion influenced New Orleans Black Spiritual churches and Mardi Gras Indian culture.

Mardi Gras Indians attend Spiritual churches because of a shared interest in the history of Native American resistance and spirit possession. Mardi Gras Indians also attract churchgoers when they perform ring shout dances with percussion in inner city clubs. In New Orleans, the Spiritual church movement was influenced by Louisiana Voodoo, folk Catholicism, Protestantism, Spiritualism, Bakongo and Nkisi culture, and other African diaspora religions such as Espiritismo and Palo Mayombe. Native American images were incorporated into the practices of New Orleans Spiritual churches as early as 1852.

After Leafy Anderson moved to New Orleans in 1920, many Spiritual churches introduced traditions associated with Mardi Gras Indians, including summoning the spirits of Native American resistance leaders such as Black Hawk, White Eagle, Red Cloud, and White Hawk. Anderson wore a Native American chief's mantle during her services to call the spirit of Black Hawk, her favorite spirit guide, who today symbolizes protest and empowerment for the marginalized women in the churches. This summoning tradition continued into the late 20th century. In the 1980s, James Anderson wore the suit of deceased tribal member Big Chief Jolley to a Black Hawk ceremony at Infant Jesus of Prague Spiritual Church. One church minister reportedly dressed as a Mardi Gras Indian to summon the spirits of Black Hawk and Reverend Adams, resulting in a "séance". Many Spiritual churches have altars to Indigenous figures, Catholic saints, ancestors, Archangel Michael, and other spirits. In one Spiritual church, a three-foot-high Indian statue is decorated with a Mardi Gras Indian headdress and bead patches.

=== African diasporan influences ===
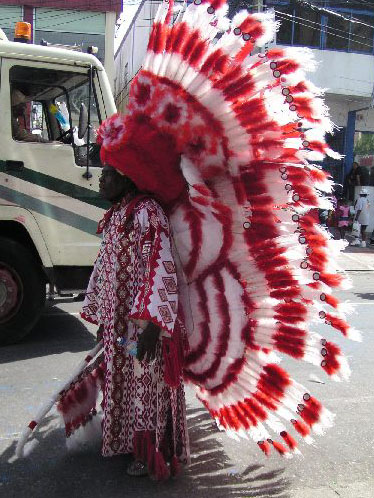
An Indian costume with an exaggerated headdress in the Caribbean Island of Trinidad. Caribbean carnival and spirituality influenced by Mardi Gras Indian culture.

Scholars have noted the similar musical, dance, and regalia practices of Black people across the African diaspora. (Note: An article from Tulane University suggests: "It is generally agreed that the Mardi Gras Indian tradition has strong Afro-Caribbean folk roots. Many observers and scholars perceive specific parallels with costumes and music of the junkanoo parades of the Bahamas, and some street celebrations in Haiti. In a broader sense the Mardi Gras Indians represent one of many reflections of New Orleans' on-going status as an epicenter of African cultural retention in America. The Indians utilize many shared traits of African and African-American music, include call-and-response, syncopation, polyrhythm with a unifying time-line, melisma, the encouragement of spontaneity, and the extremely porous boundary between performers and audiences.") The arrival of Haitian slaves during the Haitian Revolution and Dominican slaves in 1809 assimilated more Africans into the culture of Black Americans of New Orleans. Many of those Africans had Yoruba ancestry. The masquerade culture of Egungun has syncretized elements of the culture of New Orleans created by enslaved and Black communities.

By the 20th century, more Haitian immigrants settled in Louisiana. Haitians are known for rara festival culture as opposed to Black American carnivals. Other Afro-Caribbean communities started to settle in New Orleans as well. their cultures share carnival backgrounds of suits, dances and music, too.

Historian Jeroen Dewulf describes similar masking traditions—where Black people dress as Indigenous people—in Cuba, Peru, Trinidad, and Brazil. Feathered headdresses are worn in the Americas and by Kongo people in Central Africa. In African and Native American cultures, feathers have a spiritual meaning; they elevate the wearer's spirit and connect them to the spirit realm. Kongo people wear feathered headdresses in ceremonies and festivals; they are worn by African chiefs and dancers; and feathers are placed on Traditional African masks to bring in good medicine. These practices continued in the Americas. The designs of African headdresses blended with headdresses worn by Indigenous people, creating unique styles across the diaspora.

Mardi Gras Indian performances tell a story about their ancestors escaping slavery on the Underground Railroad. Author Natalie Medea describes the Young Seminole Hunters, a tribe which sculpts elaborate suits to honor the roles the Seminole people had in liberating enslaved Black people.

==== Carnival culture in the diaspora ====
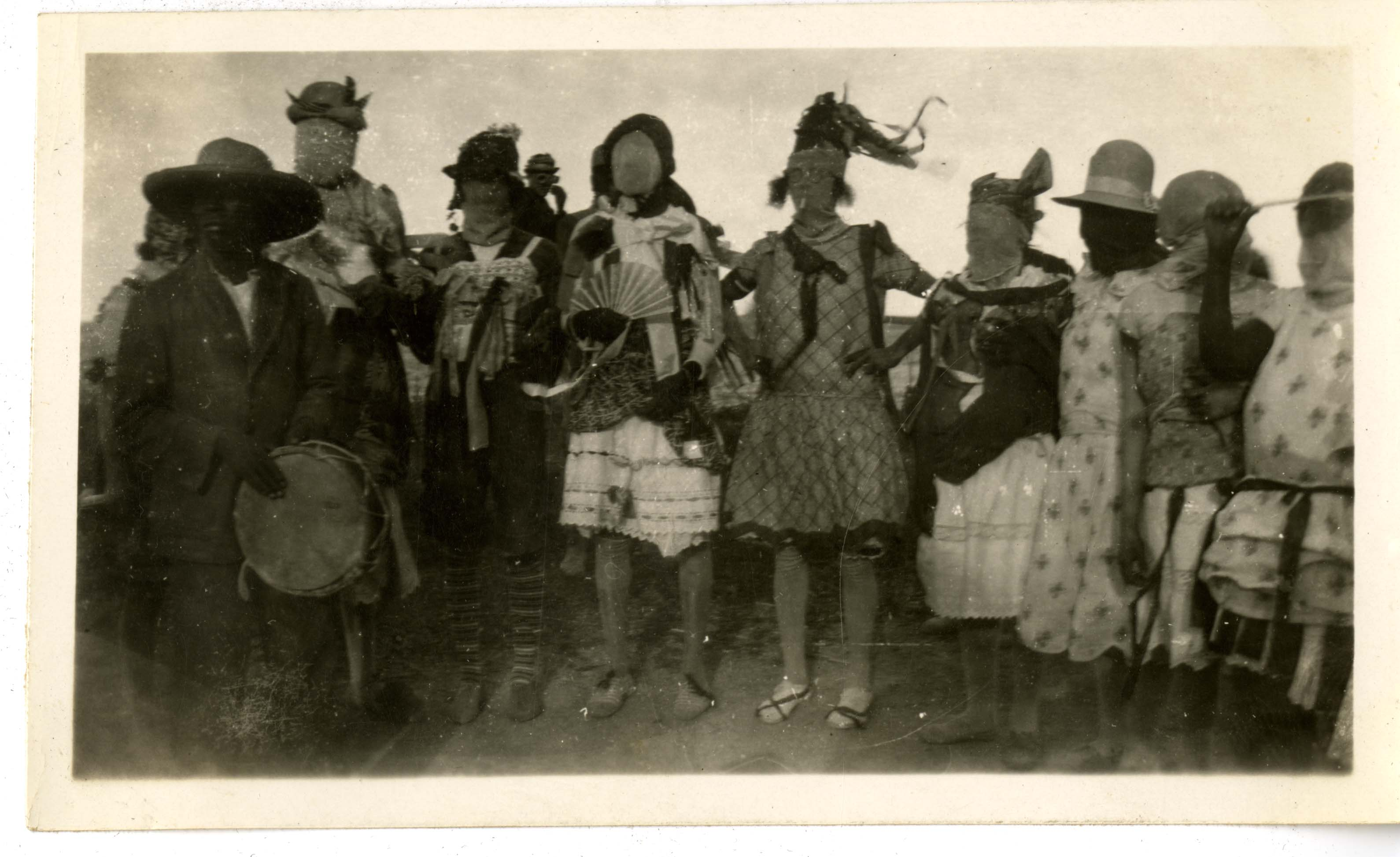
"Mardi-Gras" at Fort Liberté N. Haiti

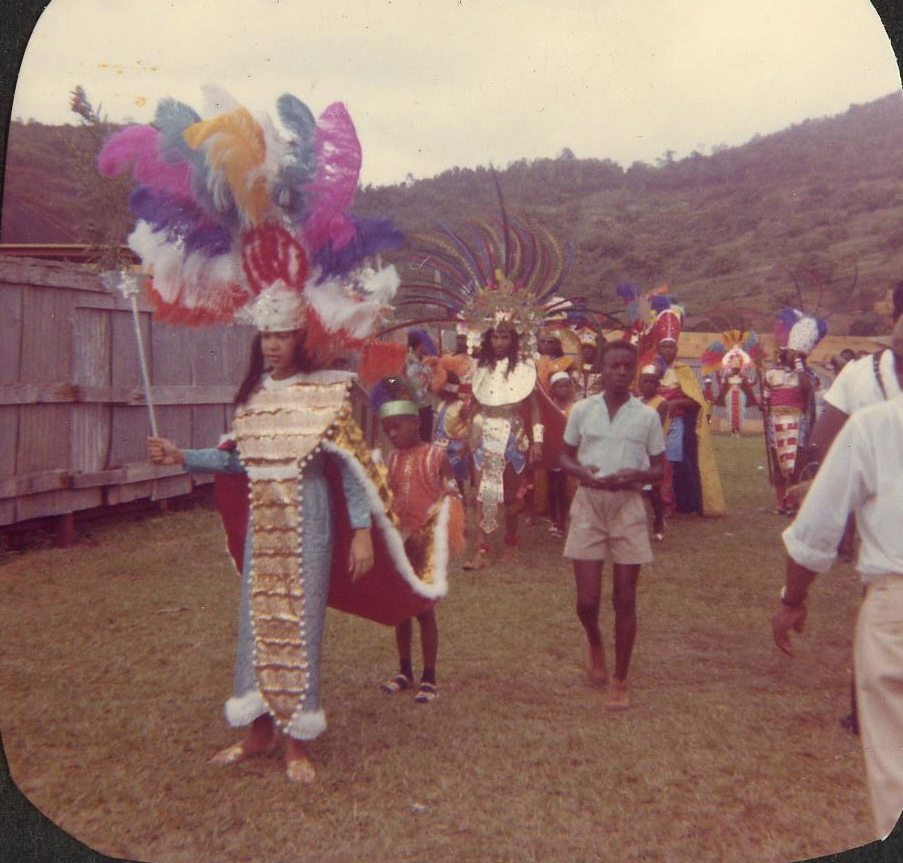
A carnival in Grenada in 1965

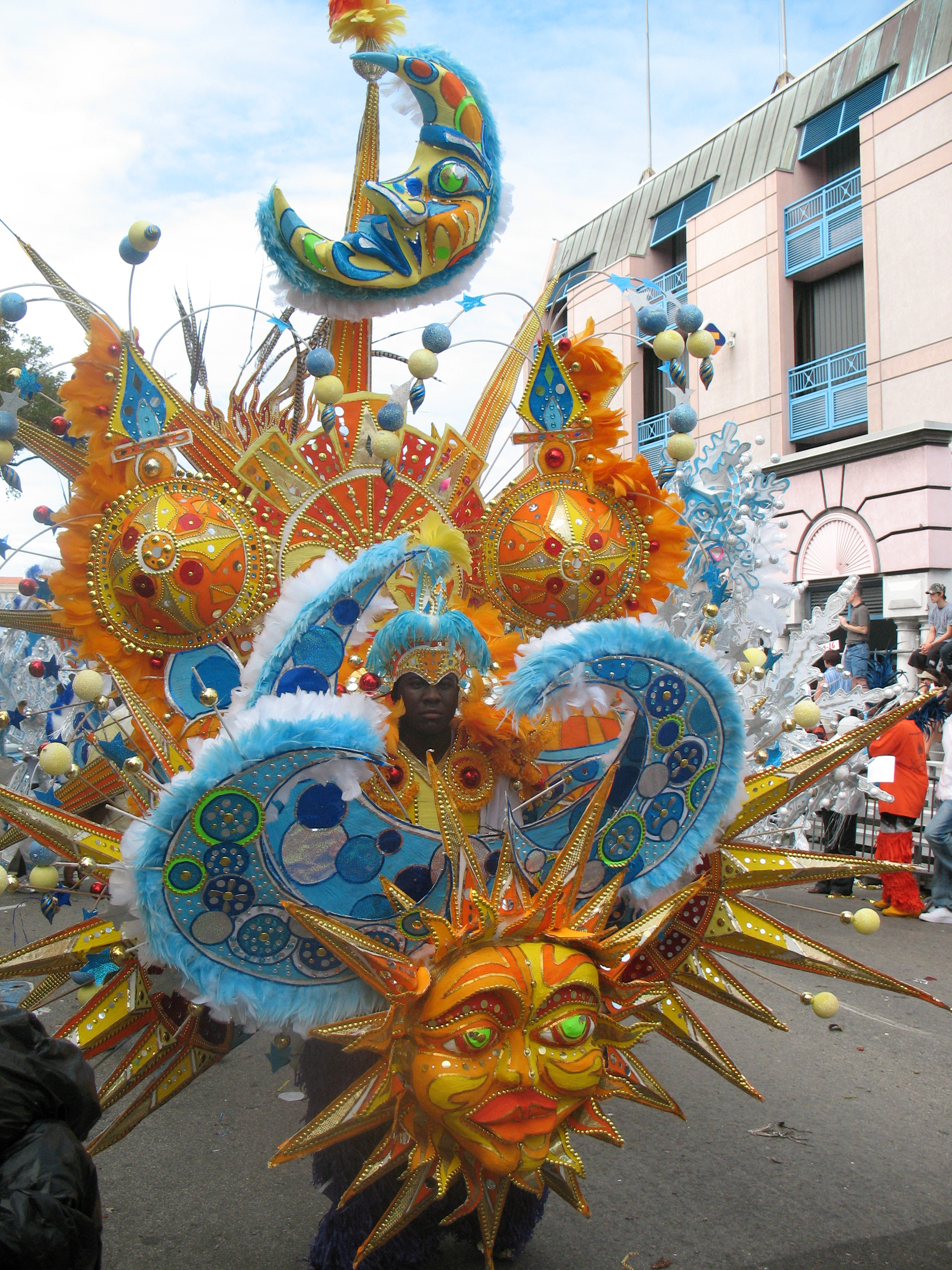
A junkanoo costume worn by Black people in the Bahamas is similar to other carnival and festival cultures in the Black diaspora.

Many Pan-American carnivals in the African diaspora have performances and regalia which resemble those of Mardi Gras Indians, such as:

- Second Line Parades - New Orleans and Cuba
- Ruberos groups – Cuba
- Escolas de Samba, Capoeira – Brazil
- Maracatu parades- Brazil
- Rara festival – Haiti
- 19th Century Jametta Carnival – Trinidad
- Trinidad and Tobago Carnival
- Jokonnu – West Indies
- Sociedad de las Congas – Panama
- French Guiana
- L'agya – Martinique

==== Masquerade ====
Black masking traditions in New Orleans are a combination of Native American and African American folk art that was sustained by Black Americans as "an expression of Black resistance to [a] white supremacist environment" and a rejection of white carnival norms. Author Raphael Njoku says: "While masquerading is reminiscent of the communal sociopolitical structures in precolonial Africa, the African Diaspora masked carnivals challenged the political powers and interests of the dominant White elite."

For many Black people, Mardi Gras—and masking in particular—is a cultural and a spiritual experience with strong ties to the African diaspora. Some Black masking Indians describe a "successful" masking experience as including "a sensation of being possessed". Masking Indian Chief Zulu says: "Once you put a mask on, you're not a person any more. You become the energy or entity of what it is you're masking." Mardi Gras Indian Albert Lambreaux describes transforming into "Big Chief" when he wears his suit. As Big Chief he becomes an authority in the community. This change of identity only occurs during Mardi Gras when Black maskers wear their regalia. This mirrors Sub-Saharan African masking traditions where a person's identity changes when they mask; the masks invite the gods to possess the individual, take them to another plane of existence, or relay messages to the community.

While the African tradition is a male right of passage, as were the masquerade traditions in West and Central Africa, in New Orleans, many Black women partake in this tradition of masking as well. Cherice Harrison-Nelson says partaking in the Mardi Gras Indian tradition was a spiritual and personal choice. Five generations of her family have masked as Indians. Harrison-Nelson notes the similar cultural practices of Mardi Gras Indians and West Africans in the music, polyrhythms, and regalia. She says: "I would say this tradition is an African-American community neighborhood-based tradition that often uses a Native American motif, which includes the feather headdresses and beadwork. But basically, everything else about it is West African."

From the 1960s, Mardi Gras Indians began to intentionally incorporate more imagery from African cultures and African diaspora religions in their regalia.

==== War dances ====
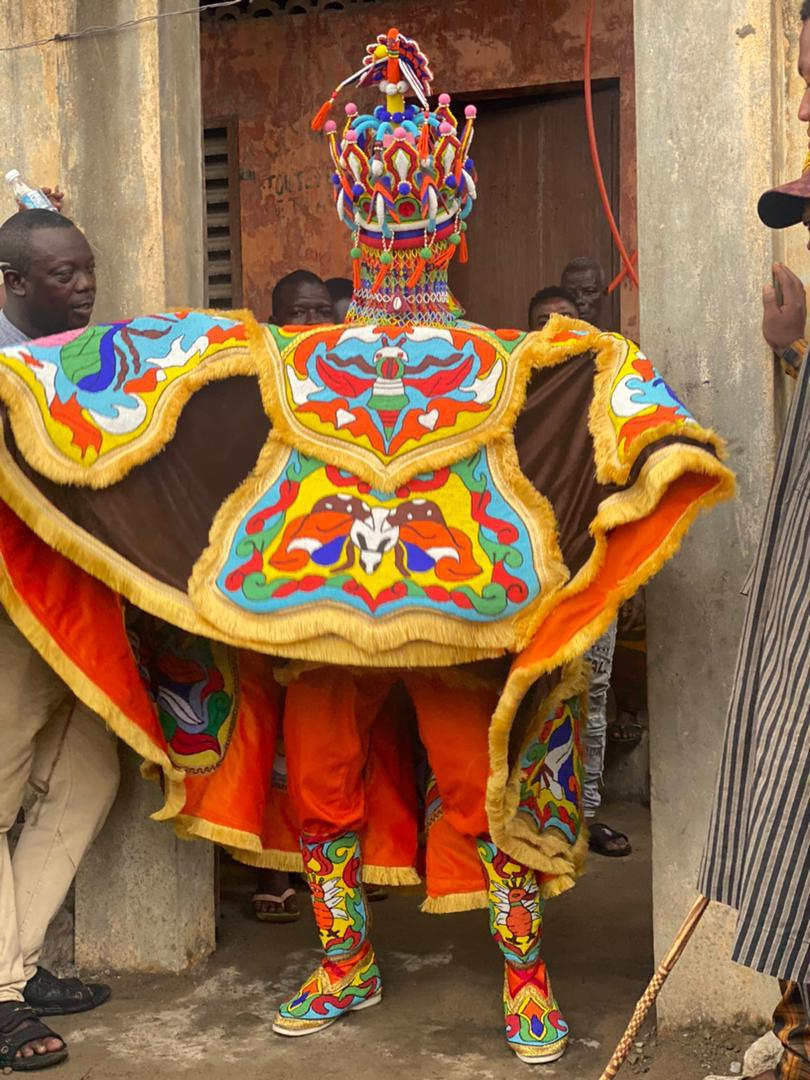
An Egungun ceremony in Benin. Scholars suggest the regalia (suits) of Mardi Gras Indians have influenced West African ceremonial cultures.

In the 1720s, the dance called Calinda (or Kalinda) developed in the Caribbean, based on African martial arts. It was brought to New Orleans by enslaved people from San Domingo and the Antilles. In Haiti and Trinidad, Calinda was a form of stick fighting and was performed during carnivals by the enslaved. In New Orleans, it became a voodoo dance and "the dance of Congo Square". The Calinda dance was performed in Congo Square around Mardi Gras time. Other dance influences were the chica, an Afro-Caribbean dance, and bamboula, an African derived dance, that were performed at Congo Square by free and enslaved people.

The performances of Mardi Gras Indians also display influences from mock-war in Native American culture. Also there are mock-war performances in Africa by warriors called sangamento from the Kingdom of Kongo. The word is derived from a verb in the Kikongo language, ku-sanga, denoting ecstatic dancers. In Portuguese ku-sanga became sangamento. Kongo people in Central Africa performed dances decorated in African feather headdresses and wore belts with jingle bells. Sangamento performers dance using leaps, contortions, and gyrations. similar to the bell styles of Mardi Gras Indians who use tambourines. During the transatlantic slave trade, Bantu people were enslaved in the Americas. Sangamentos were a brotherhood of men with a semi-underground culture that resembles the Mardi Gras Indian tradition at Congo Square. Scholars at Duke University found that Kongo peoples' culture influenced African diaspora religions, Afro-American music, and the dance and musical styles of Mardi Gras Indians.

=== Indigenous cultural influences ===
Masking Indians honor the assistance given their ancestors by incorporating American Indian symbols into their carnivals. Native American resistance is also a key theme in Mardi Gras Indian performances. (Note: An article from the Louisiana State Museum comments on the American Indian influences in Mardi Gras Indian culture. "The foundation of Black masking Indian visual storytelling is rooted in Native American resistance. Many of their suits showcase battle scenes depicting victorious Native Americans at war with U.S. soldiers." An article from UNESCO states why African Americans mask as Native people because they are "asserting dignity and respect for Indian resistance to white domination.") Black Mardi Gras Indians tell these stories of Black–Indigenous solidarity through their regalia. Scholars have found reports of Native American motifs on costumes and in parades in New Orleans since the 18th century, though Mardi Gras Indians began to incorporate more imagery from African cultures and African diaspora religions into their regalia from the 1960s.

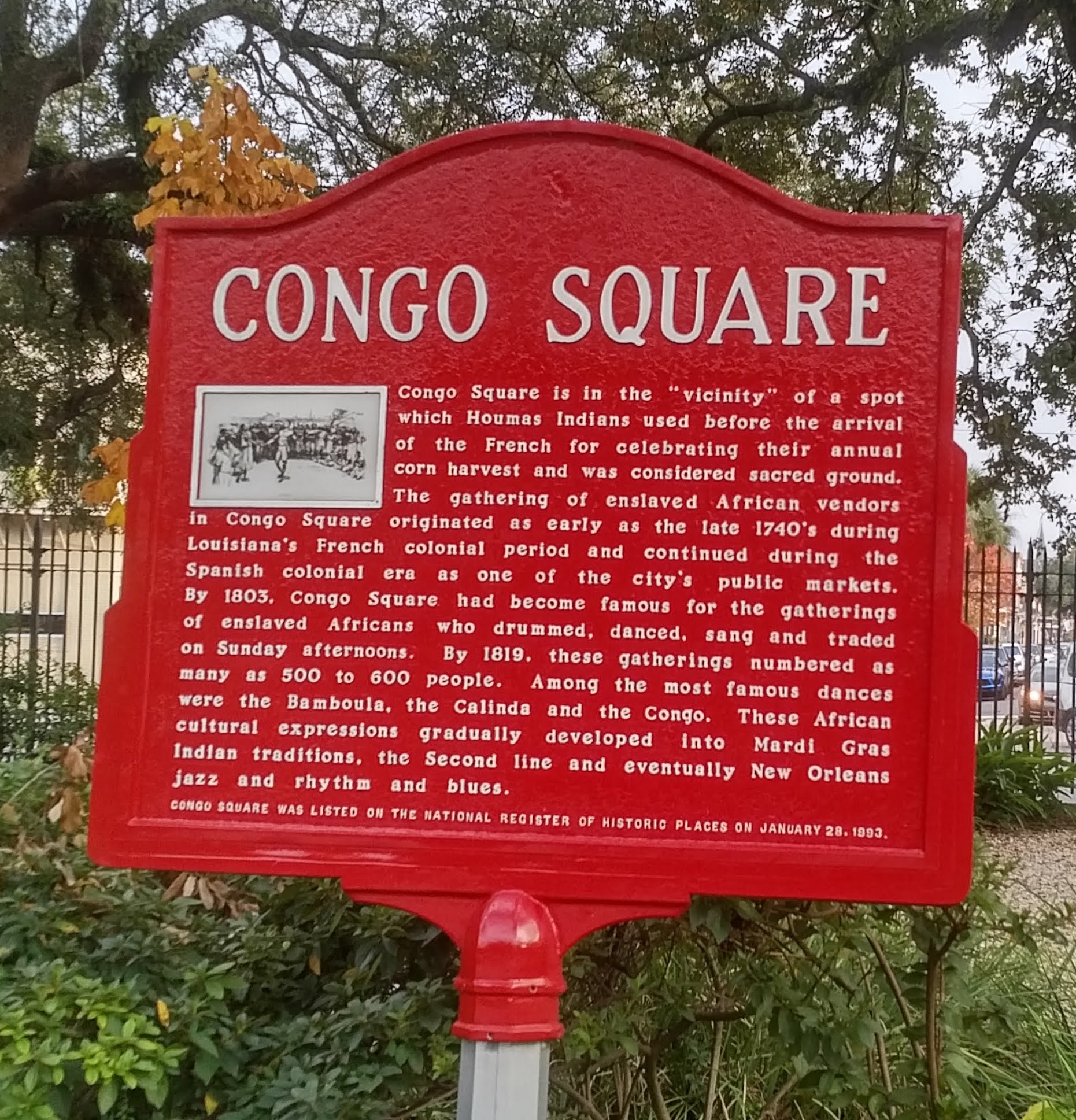
Indigenous people, enslaved Africans, and free Creoles of color had their festivals at Congo Square. Enslaved Africans incorporated elements from Native American culture.

During the late 1740s and 1750s, many enslaved Africans fled to the bayous of Louisiana where they encountered Native Americans. The Underground Railroad went through several Native American communities (local tribes included the Chitimacha, Natchez, Houma, Atakapa, and Tunica). In 1729, 280 enslaved Africans joined the Natchez to resist the French in the Natchez revolt. During these contacts, Black people adopted elements of local Native culture and blended it with their own West African and Afro-Caribbean traditions. The Chitimacha were the first to make a public musical procession in New Orleans called Marche du Calumet de Paix; this practice was likely inspired similar processions by Black New Orleanians, who gathered at Congo Square. (Note: "Members of the Chitimacha tribe marched through the city conducting a Calumet Ceremony, or a Peace Pipe Ceremony. They sang, danced, made speeches, and touched each other while sharing a pipe to celebrate peace amongst each other. A similar celebration was adopted by slaves who famously met at Congo Square." "The African American communities adopted aspects of Native culture such as their dancing techniques and their innate feather designs. They incorporated these elements into already existent parts of their culture- predominately their West African and Afro-Caribbean song and dance.") Accounts describe Black gangs dressed as "Native American militia" as early as 1836. A source from 1849 refers to Black performers on Congo Square fully covered in "the plumes of the peacock".

From 1884 to 1885, Buffalo Bill's Wild West show wintered in New Orleans, and had a multicultural cast and crew of Black, Chinese, Mexican, European and Indigenous people. (Note: Some of the cast may also have included former Buffalo Soldiers of the U.S. Ninth Cavalry Regiment who, after the American Civil War, had fought the Plains Indians on the Western Frontier.) Some scholars suggest the show may have been an indirect influence on the Mardi Gras Indians. Michael P. Smith suggests that, given the racial conditions in New Orleans at the time, these shows would have galvanized local Black audiences to identify with the plight of the Native Americans and see a shared enemy in white supremacy. (Note: Smith: "Knowing well the vernacular, multicultural character of the modern city, and having attended 'Cowboy and Indian' movies in black neighborhoods myself — where the attending public heartily supports the Indians rather than the cowboys — I would suspect that the [Buffalo Bill's Wild West] show focused attention on the plight of blacks and Indians together as outcast peoples threatened by a common enemy: white chauvinism and America's 'Christian' interest in reshaping the world in the mold of Anglo-American civilization.") Ann Dupont believes this "rekindled" the "allegiance and affinity" between Black people and Native Americans. In 1885, the first recorded Mardi Gras Indian gang was formed by Becate Batiste, a putative Black Indian; the tribe was named "The Creole Wild West". Though the New Orleans traditions of Black masking predate Buffalo Bill's show, Smith suggests the name of Batiste's tribe may have been an intentional response to it. (Note: Smith himself states that Black people in New Orleans masked as Indians prior to this, as has Maurice M. Martinez. Kalamu ya Salaam and Barbara Bridges say the similarities with other African-diasporic customs suggest Buffalo Bill's was not a major influence, and that Mardi Gras Indians should be seen in a largely pan-Caribbean context. Mardi Gras Indians reject the suggestion their culture was significantly influenced by Buffalo Bill's Wild West show because "it emphasizes imitation over originality and agency, attributing what they consider a sacred tradition to a cheap form of entertainment that exploited rather than honored Native Americans".) That same year, 50 to 60 Plains Indians reportedly also marched in native dress for Mardi Gras. Towards the end of the 19th century and into the 20th century, the presence of Native American ancestor worship in the city's Spiritual church movement may also have influenced Mardi Gras Indian traditions.

The use of some Native American motifs, such as in the names for tribes or gangs, has begun to decline among some Mardi Gras Indians; alternate names for the subculture have also been suggested, such as "Black Maskers" and the "Maroons of Urban New Orleans". Some tribes have removed the words "Indian Red" from their music. Author Michael Smith says that "Indian Red" is a Mardi Gras Indian prayer song that honors various gang members past and present, and calls for peace and justice. Andrew Pearse suggests the origins of "Indian Red" comes from a carnival song in Trinidad, "Indurubi", which may have come from the Spanish Indio Rubi ("Indian Red").

== Suits ==
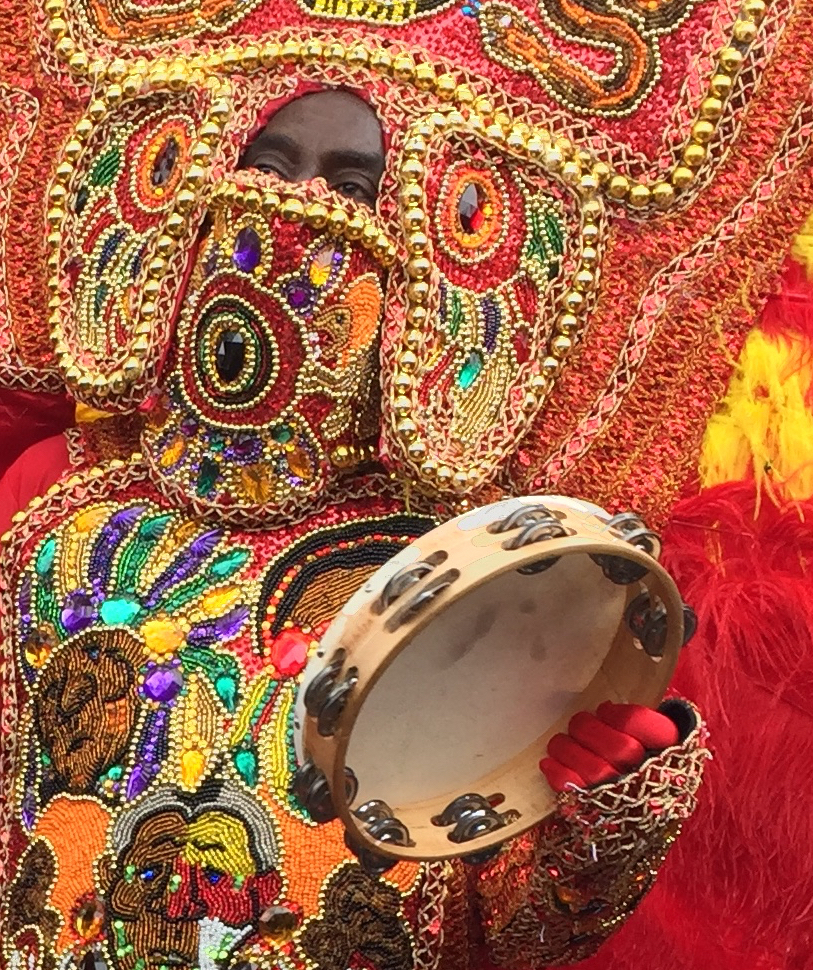
A blending of cultures shown in regalia

Mardi Gras Indian suits cost thousands of dollars in materials alone and can weigh upwards of one hundred pounds (45 kg). A suit usually takes between six and nine months to plan and complete, but can take up to a year. (Note: Darryl Montana, son of the Big Chief of the Yellow Pocahontas "Hunters" tribe states that the suits each year cost around $5,000 in materials that can include up to 300 yards of down feather trimming.) Mardi Gras Indians design and create their own suits; elaborate bead patches depict meaningful and symbolic scenes. Beads, feathers, and sequins are integral parts of a Mardi Gras Indian suit. The beadwork is entirely done by hand and features a combination of color and texture. The suits incorporate volume, giving the clothing a sculptural sensibility. Uptown New Orleans tribes tend to have more pictorial suits; downtown tribes have more 3D suits both with Native American influences. The suits are revealed on Super Sunday. Some of the suits are displayed in museums throughout the country.

Even though men are more numerous among the Mardi Gras Indians, women can become "Queens" who make their own regalia and masks. Author Cynthia Becker states the Mardi Gras Indian suits "express people's religious beliefs, historical pride, and racial heritage". Cherice Harrison-Nelson says her suits tell her family's history—the story of an ancestor who was stolen and enslaved. Harrison-Nelson adds the Ghanaian Adinkra symbols to her suits to acknowledge West Africa. Tiara Horton, Queen of the 9th Ward Black Hatchet tribe, created a Black Lives Matter suit in 2020 before the murder of George Floyd, showing beaded images of Sandra Bland, Trayvon Martin, and the Obamas. For Horton, the Mardi Gras Indian tradition is her way of protesting.

In 2024, to preserve this practice for younger generations, the Arts New Orleans' Young Artist Movement provided funding for local young Black artists to create Mardi Gras Indian suits.

=== Cultural designs ===
When making their suits, Mardi Gras Indians incorporate cultural designs from North American Indigenous cultures, African American, and African depictions within suits, making their regalia a unique form of Black-American folk art. Mardi Gras Indians initially decorated their ornaments with pearls, rhinestones, turkey feathers, fish scales, discarded beads, and sequins—along with their brightly colored ostrich feather headdresses, these can weigh over 150 pounds. Maskers have adopted a range of visual styles over the centuries, such as those in 1781 who were banned for "exhibitions against the public quietness" or those from the 1823 carnival who wore crowns of gold oblong boxes stacked on their heads. In 1804 and 1813, a German American and Swiss traveler saw Black men in "oriental and Indian dress" wearing different colored Turkish turbans. Over the years, their suits became more elaborate and colorful, some even incorporated inspirations from Africa. West African elements include cowrie shells, kente cloth, raffia, and traditional face masks and shields. Researchers have described a Nigerians using beading technique from "Uptown styles" while Bakongo are influenced from the suits of "Downtown styles."

==== African diasporan influences ====
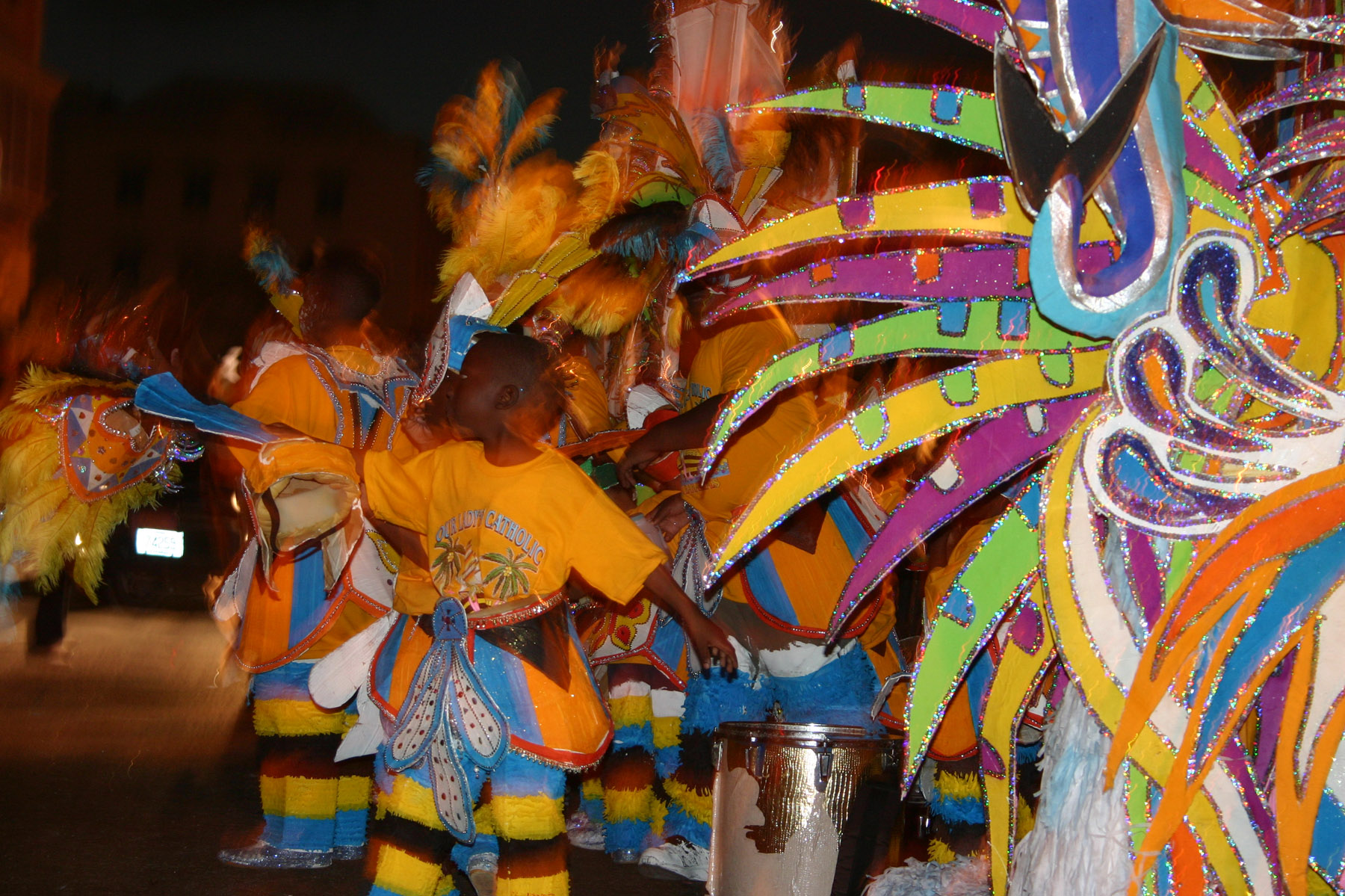
Junkanoo Festival in Nassau, Bahamas. Mardi Gras has influenced festival and carnival cultures in the Caribbean, the Bahamas, and Africa.

Over the years, Mardi Gras Indians have increasingly incorporated designs from African and African diaspora cultures in their suits such as beadwork, conch shells, dried grass strands, and designs from Bahamian Junkanoo dancers. Victor Harris, a Black Louisianan, reflects the design work of Bambara and Mandinka cultures with the use of animistic designs, raffia, and feathers.

After Emperor Haile Selassie I visited New Orleans in 1954, Rastafari influences also began to appear in suit designs. Demond Melancon incorporates Rasta colors (red, green, and gold) into his suit, and beads into his regalia historical people associated with the movement, such as the Ethiopian Emperor and his wife, Empress Menen Asfaw. By sewing these Black figures into his suits, he conjures their spirits. The Rastafari movement also inspired Eric Burt to bead cultural symbols from the religion. Some Black Mardi Gras Indians admire Rastas and display this in their music and regalia.

Some Black maskers practice traditional African religions in their daily lives and incorporate this into Mardi Gras. Mystic Medicine Man of the Golden Feather Hunters tribe shows his Congo ancestry by sewing the word nganga, a word in Kikongo that means a spiritual and herbal healer in Central Africa, into his suits. Other Black masking tribes such as the Spirit of Fi Yi Yi and the Mandingo Warriors were founded to connect with African masquerade traditions. Members of this tribe mask as Elegba, an orisha (divine spirit) that rules communication and the crossroads. Dow Edwards displays his devotion to the orisha Shango in his suits as Spy Boy of the Mohawk Hunters. Black maskers also turn to the Yoruba religion for inspiration in their designs. They blend European parading traditions and fuse the Yoruba orisha Oshun sacred imagery with the designs of their suits. Other maskers adapt Pan-African, Black Power, and Egyptian iconography into their regalia.

The Black Spiritual church movement in New Orleans in the 1920s may have influenced the regalia of Mardi Gras Indians. Some masking Indians practice Catholicism and blend Catholic saints, traditions, and feast days into their Caribbean and African religious practices during Mardi Gras.

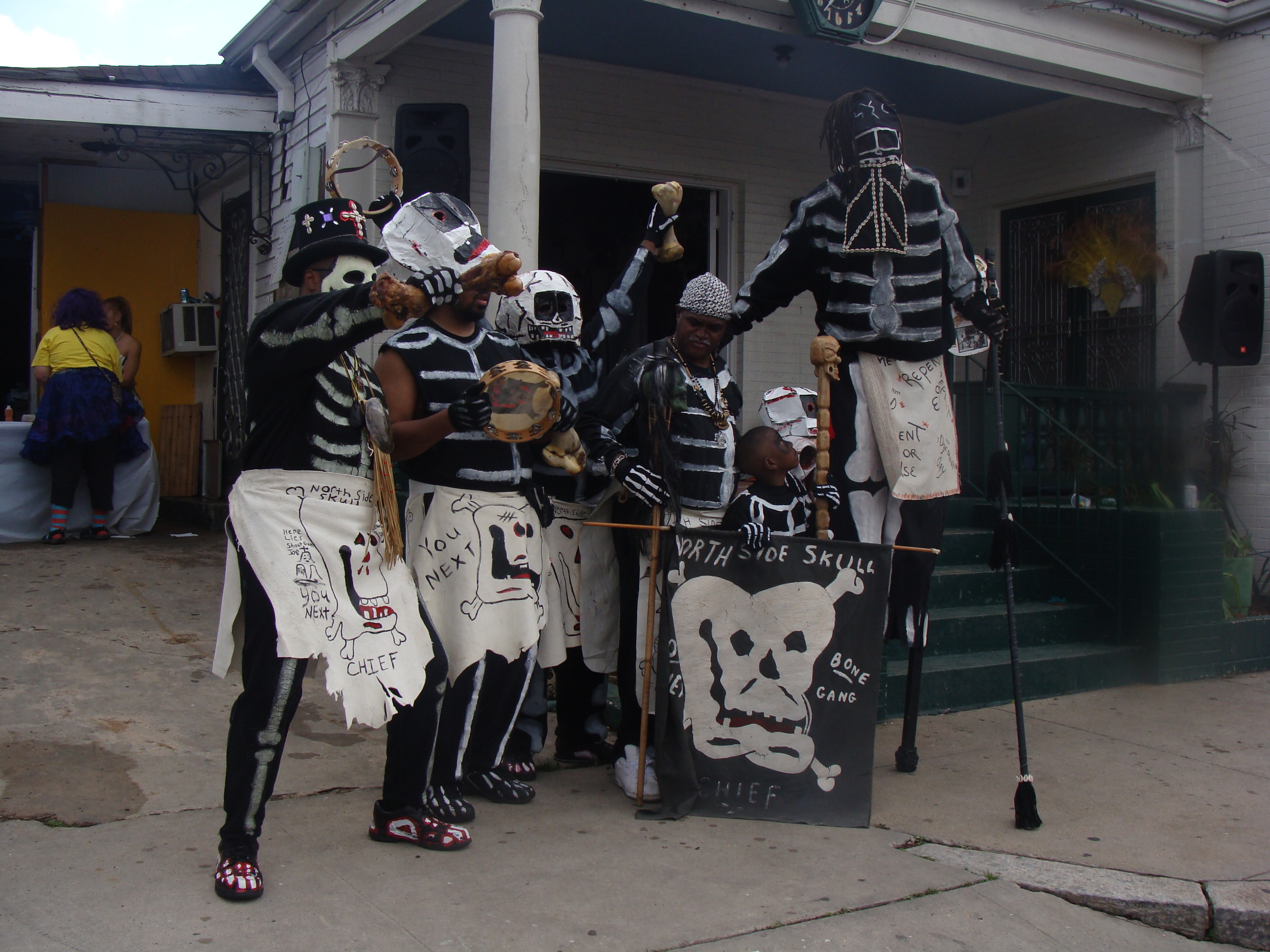
Skull and Bones maskers at the Backstreet Museum during Mardi Gras Day in Treme, New Orleans, in 2008

Mardi Gras Indians' suits also include sequined pouches inspired by healers in the Haitian Vodou community. Some masking Indians practice Louisiana Voodoo and incorporate symbols and colors from the religion into their suits. Ty Emmecca is a Big Chief of the Black Hawk Voodoo gang and his gang beads religious symbols from the religion into their regalia and performs Voodoo healing rituals during Mardi Gras. Emmecca makes patches for his suits that are similar to Haitian Vodou drapo, which are handsewn ceremonial sequin flags.

Islamic influences have also been observed in the tradition. During the transatlantic slave trade, enslaved West African Muslims were brought to New Orleans. In the 1960s, many Black people in the city practiced Islam for political and religious reasons. Two Black Masking Indians recently incorporated symbols and Islamic religious beliefs into their suits: Floyd Edwards made a breastplate with an apron honoring Mansa Musa, the 14th-century ruler of the Islamic Mali Empire; and Peteh Muhammad Haroon beaded an image of Elijah Muhammad, leader of the Nation of Islam, and the Muslim symbols of a crescent and star.

Mardi Gras Indians design their suits to emphasize their ancestral connections to African and Afro-Caribbean cultures. They have preserved many of their West-Central African culture by way of decorative folk art, music, and dance. Historian of Black Studies Joseph E. Holloway states that carnivals in New Orleans resemble African-influenced festivals from the Caribbean. The continuation of African and Afro-Caribbean influences in Mardi Gras encourages a Pan-African identity among Black people in New Orleans because of the similar decorative designs seen in regalia across the Black diaspora.

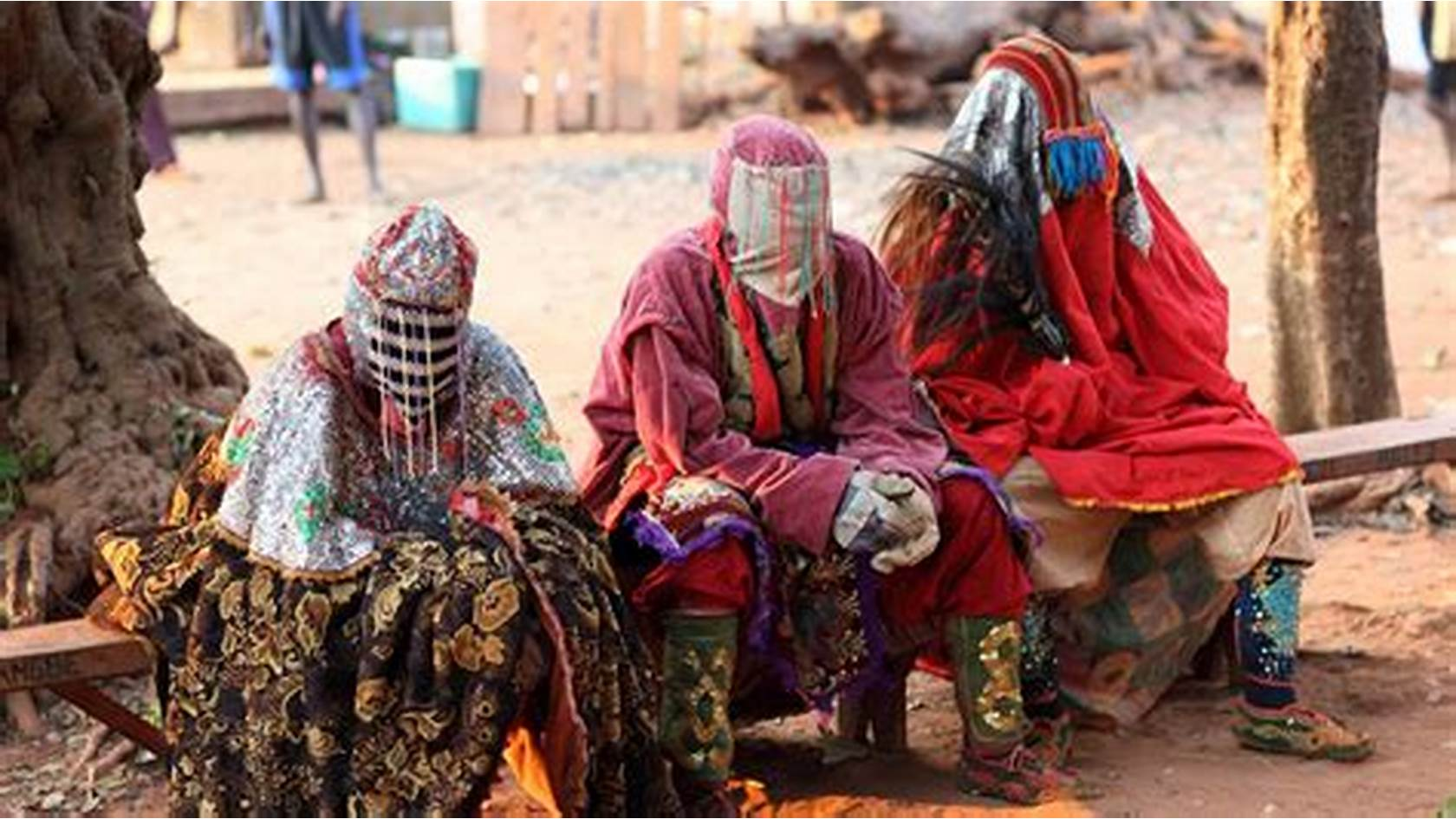
Egungun regalia

Scholars also see Igbo masquerade dances in West Africa as another cultural influence in Mardi Gras Indian communities. Igbo masquerade dancers are an all-male fraternal organization. (Note: Researcher Raphael Njoku says of this connection: "Joyce Jackson and Fehintola Mosadomi have pinpointed the origins of the Black Mardi Gras Indian carnival tradition from the colonial encounters 'between black and red men, the Afro-Caribbean ties to Trinidad, Cuba, and Haiti, the links to West African dance and musical forms, the social hypothesis stressing fraternal African-American bonds in the face of oppression.'") Egungun regalia also influenced the ceremonies and suits of Black Mardi Gras Indians. The Yoruba wear Egungun masks to invoke and honor ancestral spirits. The masks signify the souls of deceased relatives who return to earth to interact with their living descendants. This cultural influence is also shown in the images of ancestors and Black historical people beaded into Mardi Gras Indians' suits. Beading is often described as a spiritual experience for Black New Orleanians, who have described entering a meditative trance when sewing their suits.

==== Native American influences ====
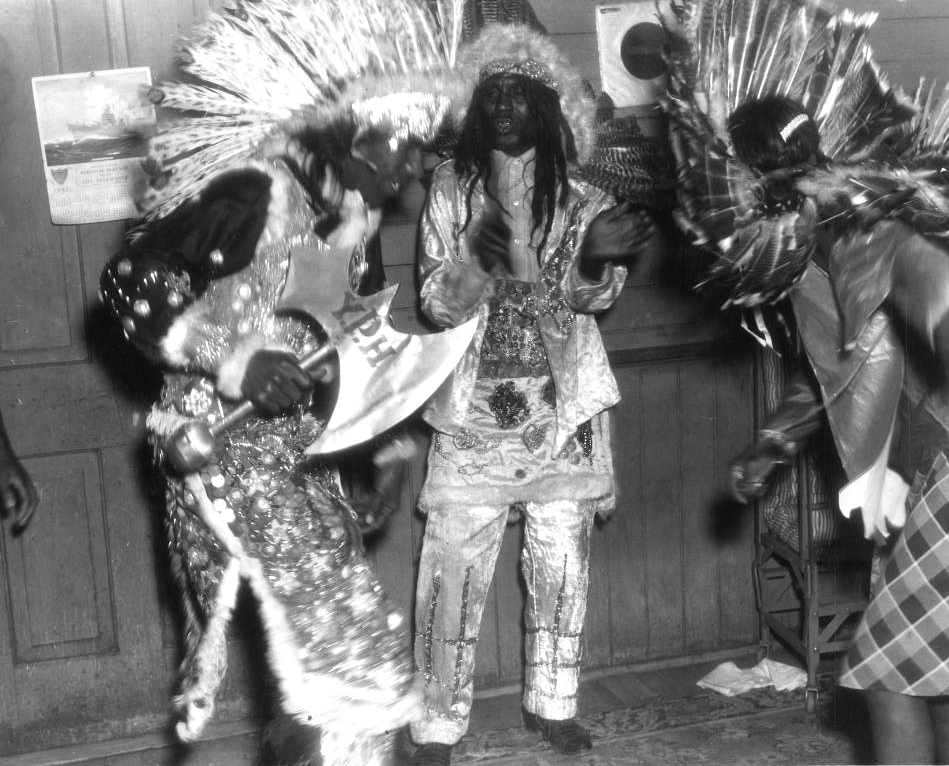
Chief and members of the "Yellow Pocahontas" "tribes" St. Joseph's Day, 1942; their suits show more American Indian influences.

Native American motifs are incorporated into the headdresses and feather designs of Mardi Gras Indian regalia. (Note: Becker states: "Mardi Gras Indian headdresses resembled the so-called war bonnets worn by Native American chiefs and warriors in the Plains region, among the Sioux, Crow, Blackfoot, Arapaho, Cheyenne, and Plains Cree. Despite the name, these headdresses were typically worn by Native Americans on ceremonial occasions rather than into battle. Plains Indian men wearing such "war bonnets" were the frequent subjects of late nineteenth century photographers and often appeared on postcards and other forms of widely circulating popular media, which came to represent the archetypal "classic" Native American. The fact that the headdresses worn by Black Indians clearly drew on those worn by Native American men from the northern Plains rather than from the southeastern United States, such as the Choctaw and the Houma, raises both historical and interpretive questions.") The Mardi Gras Indians take inspiration from Native American resistance and their fight against white U.S. cavalry soldiers. Some Mardi Gras Indians report that they call on the spirit of Sauk leader Black Hawk for peace and justice.

Some of the Mardi Gras Black Indians' regalia may be influenced by popular depictions of Native Americans and their cultures. For instance, Mardi Gras Indians sometimes wear war bonnets, even though the Indigenous people who helped enslaved people escape from slavery were from Southeastern Native American tribes that do not wear war bonnets.

=== Cultural preservation ===
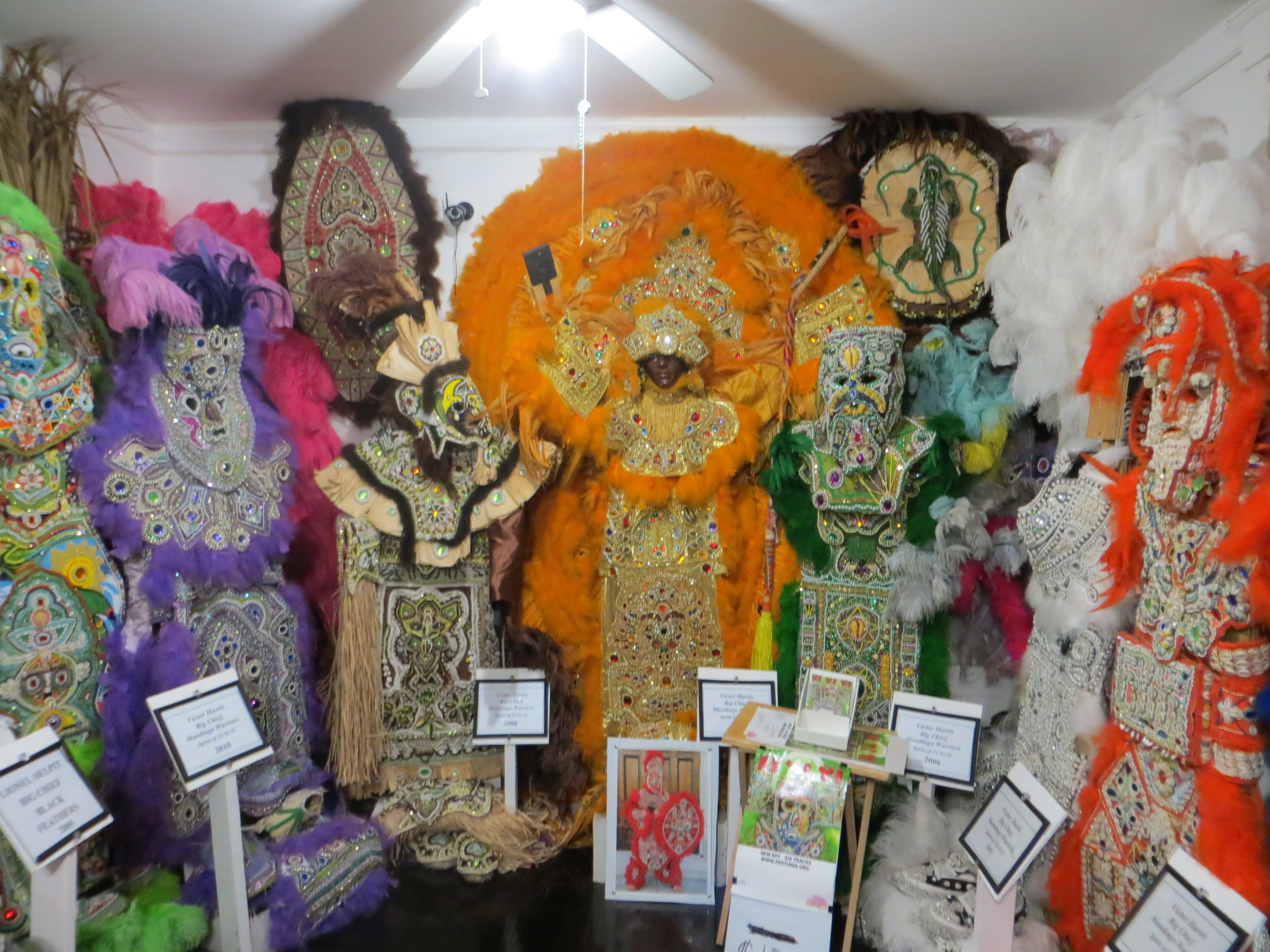
Suits displayed at Backstreet Cultural Museum

The Mardi Gras Indians traditions are considered a unique artform and ritual which represents New Orleans' Black culture. Curators are preserving the history of Mardi Gras Indians by displaying and storing their elaborate suits in museums. To preserve the suits, curators work with the makers to prevent damage.

The Historic New Orleans Collections Museum has partnered with the city's Black arts community to preserve their culture. Curator Loren Brown says of the process:

These suits are not just pretty costumes; as many practitioners have stated, they also hold a deeper spiritual significance, and so we must consider a respectful way to care for them. For instance, when repairs are necessary, it may be best to have the original maker or a member of the maker's tribe perform the work instead of a textile conservator.

== Tribes ==
Mardi Gras Indians organize in groups known as "tribes" (or "gangs"). Typically, they identify by tribe names, rather than as "Mardi Gras Indians" or "Black Masking Indians". Scholars have described the Mardi Gras Indian tribes as spiritual secret societies, mutual-aid organizations, and social clubs. Group names are influenced by street names, ancestry and important cultural figures. The Transatlantic Slave Trade introduced West Africans to Native Americans, for example, some Black Americans descend from Senegalese or Mandinka people in West Africa; and once in America those interactions caused some to have Native American ancestry. Tribes with Seminole in their name reflect stories of enslaved people who escaped slavery and found refuge in the Seminole Nation. Plains Indian names may be inspired by depictions of Native Americans in popular culture. During parades, some tribes are identified by their masks.

- 7th Ward Creole Hunters
- 7th Ward Hard Headers
- 7th Ward Hunters
- 9th Ward Hunters
- Algiers Warriors 1.5
- Apache Hunters
- Black Cherokee
- Black Eagles
- Black Feather
- Black Hatchet
- Black Hawk Hunters
- Black Mohawks
- Black Seminoles
- Burning Spears
- Carrollton Hunters
- Cheyenne Hunters
- Chippewa Hunters
- Choctaw Hunters
- Comanche Hunters
- Congo Nation
- Creole Apache
- Creole Osceola
- Creole Wild West
- Flaming Arrows
- Geronimo Hunters
- Golden Arrows
- Golden Blades
- Golden Comanche
- Golden Eagles
- Golden Feather Hunters
- Golden Star Hunters
- Guardians of the Flame
- Hard Head Hunters
- Louisiana Star Choctaw Nation
- LoyalBreed Apache Warriors
- Mandingo Warriors
- Mohawk Hunters
- Monogram Hunters
- Morning Star Hunters
- Northside Skull and Bones Gang
- Red Hawk Hunters
- Red Flame Hunters
- Red White and Blue
- Seminole Hunters
- Seminole (Mardi Gras Indian Tribe)
- Spirit of FiYiYi (aka Fi-Yi-Yi)
- Timbuktu Warriors
- Trouble Nation
- Unified Nation
- Uptown Warriors
- Washitaw Nation
- White Cloud Hunters
- White Eagles
- Wild Apache
- Wild Bogacheeta
- Wild Tchoupitoulas
- Wild Magnolias
- Wild Mohicans
- Yellow Pocahontas
- Yellow Jackets
- Young Navaho
- Young Brave Hunters
- Young Monogram Hunters
- Young Cheyenne
- Young Seminole Hunter

Groups are largely independent, but a pair of umbrella organizations loosely coordinates the Uptown Indians and the Downtown Indians. The Mardi Gras Indian Council coordinates between more than 40 active tribes, which range in size from half a dozen to several dozen members. Their suits are displayed in museums in Louisiana and the Smithsonian.

Traditionally, Mardi Gras Indians were only seen in public in full regalia on Mardi Gras Day, Saint Joseph's Day (March 19) and the Sunday nearest to Saint Joseph's Day ("Super Sunday"). In recent years, it has become more common to see Mardi Gras Indians at other festivals and parades in the city as well. For example, the New Orleans Jazz & Heritage Festival has hired tribes to appear at their festival.

=== Parade formation and protocol ===
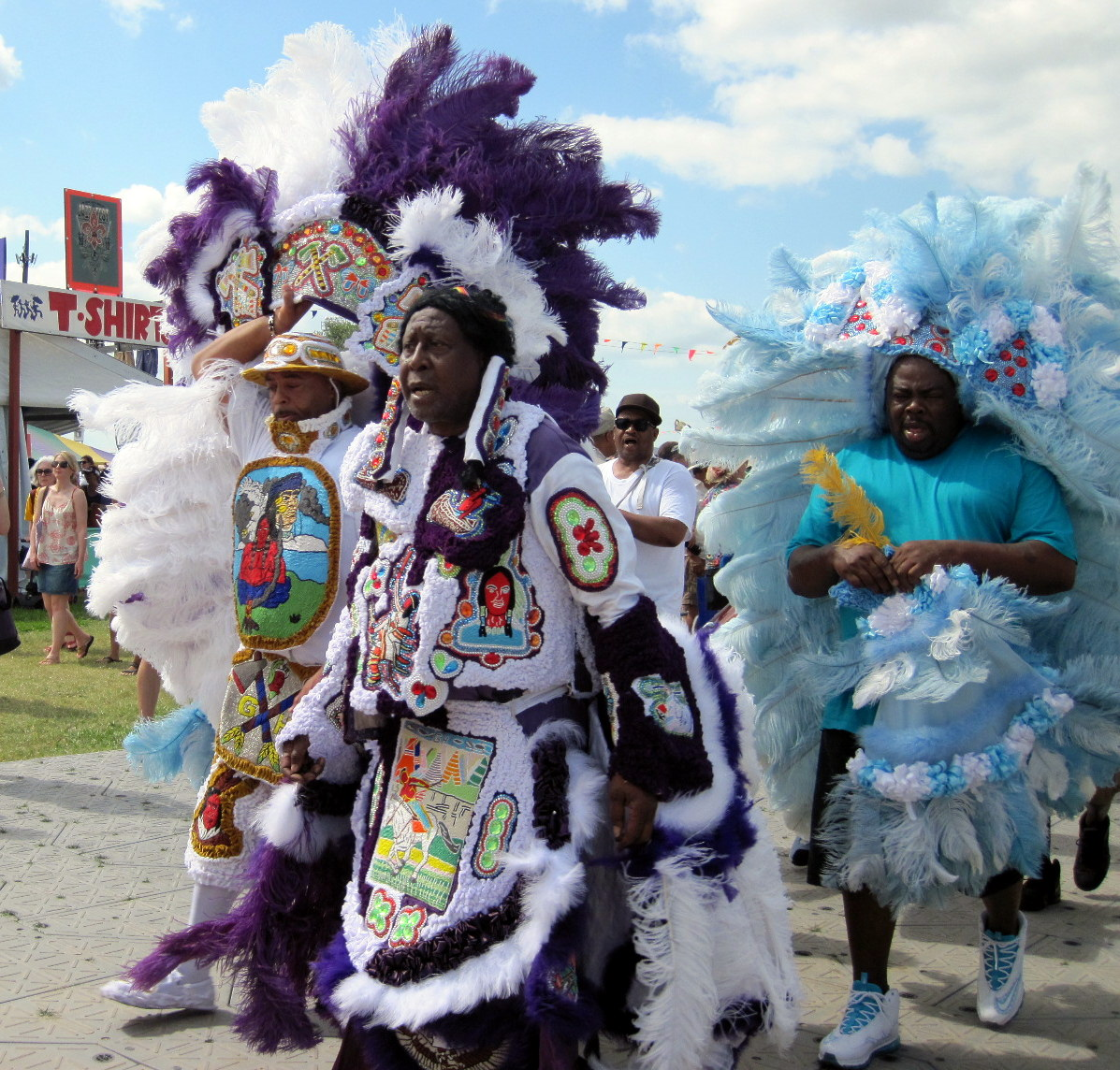
Jazz Fest in New Orleans in 2012 at a Mardi Gras Indian parade

The Mardi Gras Indians play various traditional roles. Many blocks ahead of the Indians are plain-clothed informants keeping an eye out for any danger. The procession begins with "spyboys", dressed in light "running suits" that allow them the freedom to move quickly in case of emergency. Next comes the "first flag", an ornately dressed Indian carrying a token flag in their gang colours. Closest to the "Big Chief" is the "Wildman" who usually carries a symbolic weapon. Finally, there is the Big Chief, who decides where to go and which tribes to meet (or ignore). The entire group is followed by a "second line" of percussionists and revelers. Traditionally, the second line would also have to protect the front line of paraders from violence.

During the march, the Indians dance and sing traditional songs particular to their individual tribes. They use creole dialects or patois, loosely based on different African and European languages. The Big Chief decides where the group will parade; the parade route is different each time. When two tribes come across each other, they either pass by or meet for a symbolic fight. Each tribe lines up and the Big Chiefs taunt each other about their suits and their tribes. The drum beats of the two tribes intertwine, and the face-off is complete. Both tribes continue on their way.

==== Skull and Bones gangs ====
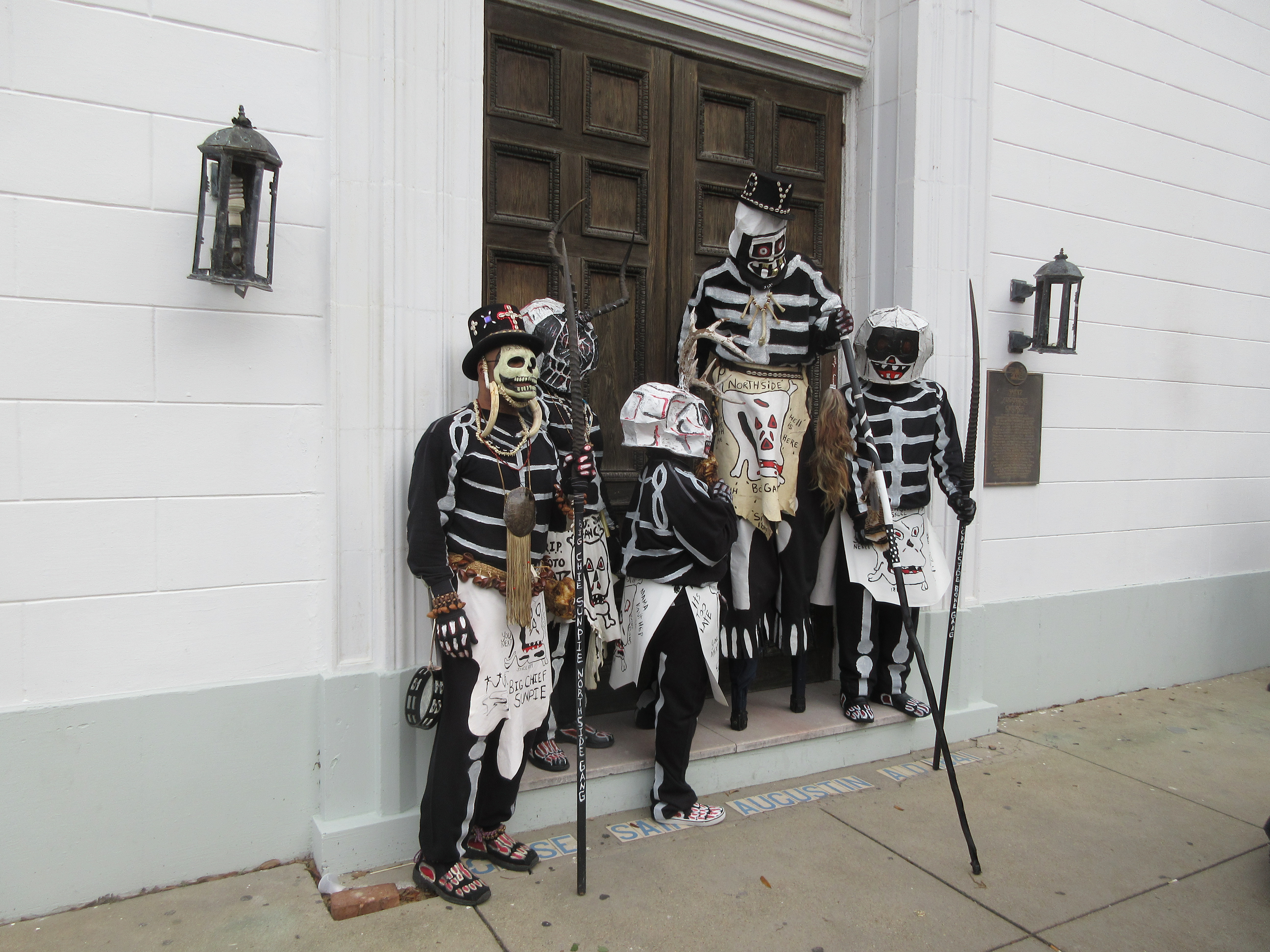
Northside Skull and Bones gang, Mardi Gras Morning in Treme in 2018

The Northside Skull and Bones gang and other masking traditions continue at Treme during Mardi Gras. According to local oral history, the Skull and Bones Gangs started in 1819 in Treme. Black Maskers dress in black costumes with painted white skeleton bones to honor the dead and to caution the living that death is inevitable. Participants state that the tradition came to New Orleans by way of Caribbean and African cultures where the dead are honored in the Haitian Vodou religion. Skull and Bones masker Bruce "Sunpie" Barnes traveled to Africa and said he saw skeleton-like spirits and Voodoo markets. During Mardi Gras, Barnes recognizes the Guédé, a family of spirits in Haitian Vodou that are guardians of the cemetery. Skull and Bones gangs act as spiritual town guardians and carnival town criers. Jazz historian John McCusker found skeleton maskers were referenced in archives dating back to 1875. A 1902 local newspaper, Times-Democrat, referenced young Black maskers on the streets of North Claiborne Avenue, North Robertson and Annette.

==== Conflict ====
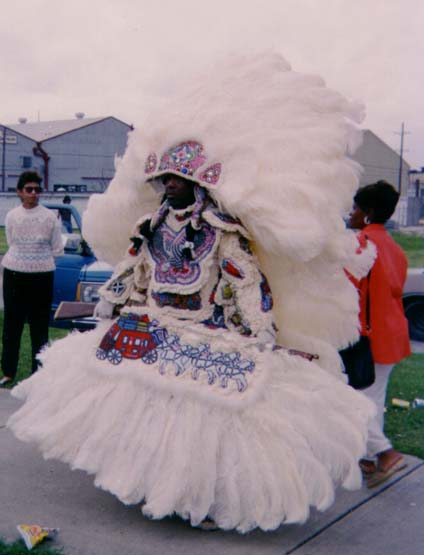
Mardi Gras Indian getting ready

In the early days of the Mardi Gras Indians, masking and parading was also a time to settle grudges. This part of Mardi Gras Indian history is referenced in James Sugar Boy Crawford's song, "Jock-A-Mo" (better known and often covered as "Iko Iko"), based on their taunting chants. Violence began to decline from the 1950s, and by the 1960s, "Chief of Chiefs" Allison Montana worked to end regular violence between the Mardi Gras Indian tribes. He said, "I was going to make them stop fighting with the gun and the knife and start fighting with the needle and thread." Today, the Mardi Gras Indians settle their fights through the "prettiness" of their suits instead of violence.

== Racism ==
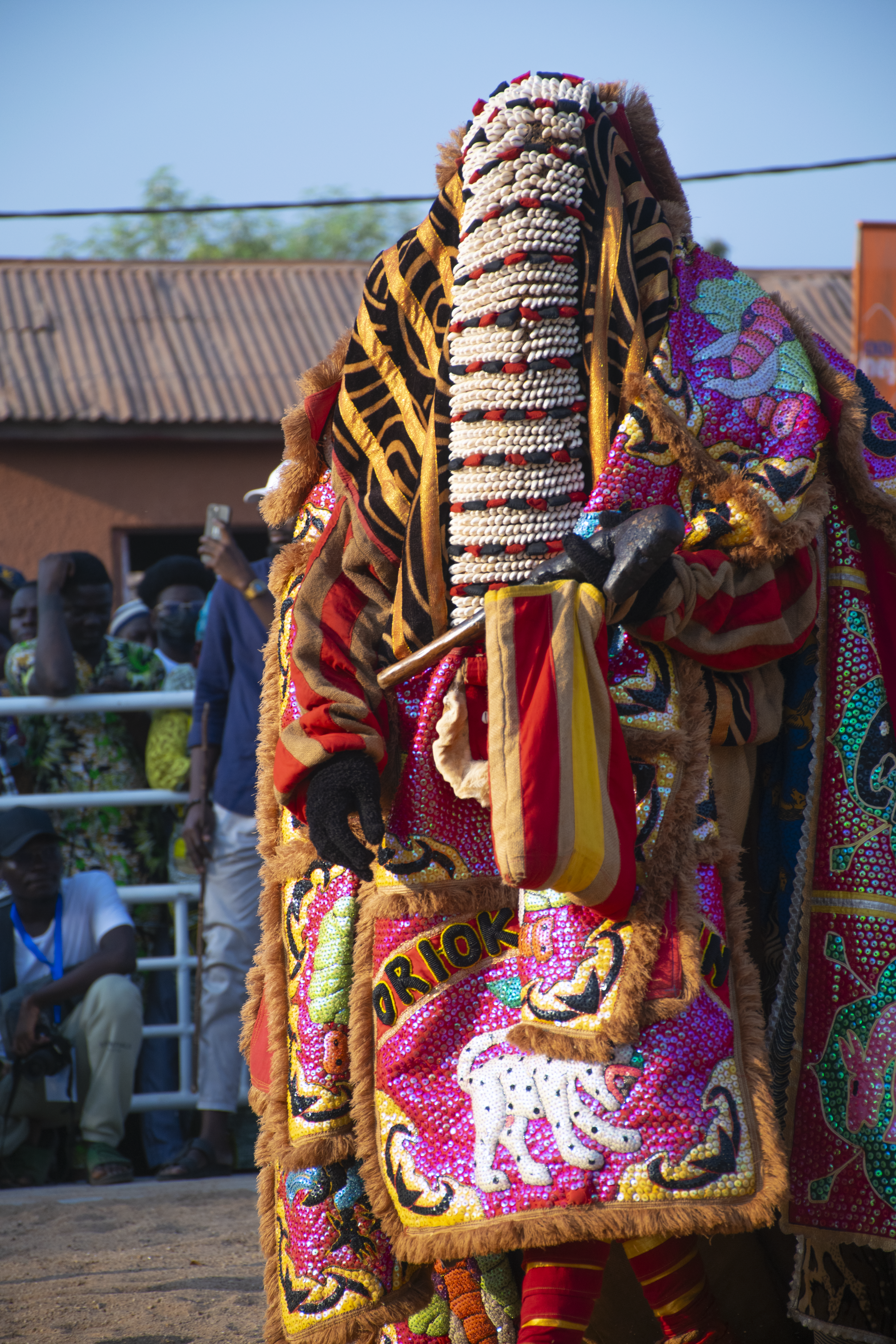
An Egungun ceremony in Benin. The suits of Mardi Gras Indians have influenced West African ceremonial costumes.

The cultural performances of Mardi Gras Indians are rooted in the history of racial discrimination in New Orleans. Free and enslaved Black people were banned from attending Mardi Gras by white New Orleans carnival krewes. Instead, African American communities celebrated Mardi Gras by incorporating Native American and Black diasporic rhythms, drumming, dance, and masking traditions into their own festivities, and masked as Indians to tell stories of enslaved people escaping slavery and finding refuge in Native American communities. Masking allowed Black Americans to celebrate their African heritage under a more acceptable guise as "Indians", while showing solidarity with, and paying tribute to, Native American ancestors and allies. (Note: Scholar Karen Williams says: "Masking Indian allows the African-American to 'safely' call attention to his likeness to the Indian, at the same time veiling from the dominant white culture what he is actually doing - flamboyantly expressing his African ancestry". Ann Dupont says: "The Indian masking tradition is used by the black working-class males of the tribes to metaphorically express the 'exotically marginalized' position of the Native American Indian and the African American by using mediums of expression deeply rooted in African heritage.")

Mardi Gras Indians have continued to experience marginalization and police brutality into the 21st century. In response, the Mardi Gras Indian Council formed in 1985 to facilitate better coordination between the 32 tribes and their members.

=== Cultural appropriation ===
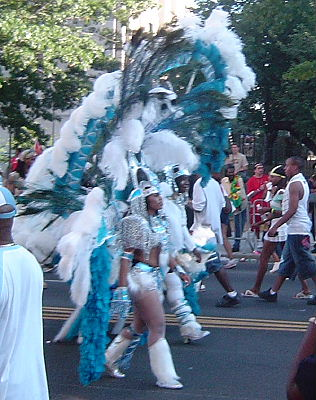
West Indian parades influenced carnivals in New Orleans.

Most scholars agree that Mardi Gras Indian traditions subvert the racial stereotypes used by white New Orleanians during the 18th, 19th and 20th centuries. At the time, white revelers often used caricatures of Native Americans and Black people. Early descriptions of Black revelers indicate that free and enslaved Black people caricatured these European traditions in turn, like other celebratory reflections found in African, Caribbean and Indigenous traditions.

Indigenous motifs continue to appear in the suits and regalia of Mardi Gras Indians and some krewes are named after Native American groups, although most of the costumes and music derive from Caribbean traditions with older West and Central African roots. Some scholars and campaigners have therefore suggested that the use of these Native American motifs is a form of cultural appropriation. Scholars have also debated whether the use of "war paint" and feathered headdresses is based on negative stereotypes of Indigenous peoples.

The campaigner Adrienne Keene (Cherokee Nation) says she is unsure if the Mardi Gras Indian tradition is cultural appropriation, but that it makes many Native Americans uncomfortable. She suggests that because "The history of Mardi Gras Indians comes out of a history of shared oppression and marginality between the Black and Native residents", the tradition may have evolved "outside of the realm of cultural appropriation into a distinct culture and community".

New Orleans filmmaker Jonathan Isaac Jackson says the Mardi Gras Indians have their own unique tradition, which emerged from syncretism of West African and Native American traditions, but suggests that white people and outsiders have begun using Mardi Gras Indian practices without these traditional connections to the culture. He says:

People are moving away from New Orleans, and people are moving into New Orleans that aren't affiliated with the culture. One of the big things I was looking at and thinking about is the idea that, at some point, we would see white tribes. I was trying to figure out how to document or tell a story where it's understood how connected to our ancestors this tradition truly is. It's a way of saying, 'We don't want you to not dress up as a Mardi Gras Indian because you're not Black. We want you to respect the fact that you shouldn't want to dress up as a Mardi Gras Indian because it's associated with Black culture and its roots go back all the way back to Africa.'

Mardi Gras Indians have worked with lawyers to copyright their creations and prevent people from profiting off their designs.

==== Popular caricatures ====
Folklorist Michael P. Smith and historian Ann Dupont suggest early Black maskers may have "rekindled" a historic solidarity with Native Americans in part as a response to seeing racist caricatures of Native Americans and Black people in carnival and popular culture. Scholars Shane Lief and John McCusker have suggested that Mardi Gras Indian traditions were influenced, at least in part, by negative portrayals of Black and Native American people in the minstrel shows and Wild West shows of the 19th and early 20th centuries. Wild West shows sometimes had Black performers who worked alongside Asians, Mexicans, and Native Americans. (Note: For example, Warner McCary, a Black man who escaped slavery in Natchez and took on a Native American persona ("Okah Tubbee"), was a popular performer in New Orleans.)

Smith and others also suggest that Mardi Gras Indians had masked as Indigenous people before such racialized portrayals became popular. Scholars such as Maurice Martinez, Jeroen Dewulf, and Kalamu ya Salaam suggest that ultimately Caribbean cultures influenced the Mardi Gras Indian tradition, noting the Black masking traditions found in parts of the Caribbean and South America that predate popular Eurocentric interpretations of Native Americans. In these regions, Black people "masked" as Indigenous people because of a shared history of oppression.

==== Reasons for masking ====
Scholar Nikesha Elise Williams suggests two reasons why Black Americans mask as Indigenous people:

Masking as indigenous has served at least two important purposes. It's a way to pay homage to their ancestors and their friendship with the Native American tribes that harbored them 'while also paying tribute to the warrior culture of African tribes that were enslaved on the continent and brought over to the new world...'

David Guss says that when Black Americans "mask" as Indigenous peoples they are not trying to be Native American; they are telling a visual story of how enslaved Africans escaped slavery in Louisiana and found refuge in nearby Native American villages. He says Black people are not ridiculing or parodying Native Americans. Guss describes the Mardi Gras Indians, Andean natives that dress as European colonists, and other examples of one ethnicity dressing or masking as another ethnicity as practising "ethnic cross-dressing".

==== Terminology ====
Donald Harrison Jr., a member of the Congo Nation group, says that his group changed their name because "some Native Americans may be angry about it", and chose an African name because they are "an African-American tribe of New Orleans".

Demond Melancon, a member of the Young Seminole Hunters, suggests the name of this cultural tradition should also change: "It's been a hidden culture for 250 years and you have to know where it really comes from." He says that because the masking tradition originated in Africa, the subculture should be called "Black Maskers". Author Michael P. Smith suggests calling them the "Maroons of Urban New Orleans".

Some Mardi Gras Indians have also decided to drop the words "Indian Red" from the song of the same name to avoid offending Indigenous people. The song "Indian Red" has been called a "prayer" for the Black Masking tradition, and has been used since at least the 1940s.

== In popular culture ==
- The HBO series Treme features one tribe of Mardi Gras Indians, the Guardians of the Flame, in one of the major plot lines weaving through the series, featuring preparations, the parades, as well as strained relationships with the police department.
- The song "Iko Iko" mentions two Mardi Gras Indian tribes.
- Beyoncé's 2016 visual album Lemonade showcases a Mardi Gras Indian circling a dining table, paying homage to the New Orleans culture.
- In the Freeform series Cloak & Dagger, based on the eponymous Marvel Comics characters, Tyrone Johnson's father and brother were Mardi Gras Indians prior to the events of the show. When Tyrone discovers his signature cloak, it is revealed his brother was working on it while training to be a spyboy.

== Sources ==
- Barnett, James F. Jr. (2007). The Natchez Indians: A History to 1735. Jackson, Mississippi: University Press of Mississippi. ISBN 9781578069880. OCLC 86038006.
- Le Page du Pratz, Antoine-Simon (1774) [French version published in 1763]. The History of Louisiana. London, United Kingdom: T. Becket. OCLC 1949294.
