= Lionel Delpit =

Black Feather Big Chief Lionel Delpit (1957—July 7, 2011) was a "tribal chief" of the Black Feather Mardi Gras Indians. He was renowned for his intense singing voice and smooth dances during performances, as well as his natural leadership.
