= Delpit marriage case =

Quebec marriage and religious controversy

The Delpit marriage case, sometimes known as the Delpit affair (French: l'affaire Delpit), was a controversy concerning marriage and religion in Quebec at the turn of the 20th century.

On 2 May 1893, Édouard Delpit, aged 23, married Marie Berthe Aurore Jeanne Côté, aged 16 and 2 months, in Montreal. At birth, both Delpit and Côté were Catholic. They later abandoned the faith. They were married by Reverend William S. Barnes, a Unitarian minister.

The marriage did not go well. Côté filed for divorce in court. After Côté's filing, Delpit sought assistance from the "ecclesiastical authorities", requesting a declaration that the marriage was a nullity. Delpit argued that his marriage to Côté was a clandestine marriage because Delpit and Côté were Catholic but had been married by a Protestant. A clandestine marriage was a marriage performed contrary to canon law.

Delpit won initially. Monsignor Marois, (Note: Likely Cyrille Alfred Marois. See Jesuits' Estates Act. Montreal: Witness Printing House. 1889. p. 21. OCLC 1047482390.) the vicar general of Quebec, declared the marriage void in canon law. On 23 November 1900, an ecclesiastic judgment issued at Rome confirmed the Quebec determination, holding that the Delpit marriage was void in canon law because clandestine. On 13 January 1901, Archbishop Paul Bruchési sent a pastoral letter to Quebec churches stating that civil courts had no authority to overturn ecclesiastical authorities' determination of a marriage's validity. On 16 January, Delpit filed in the Quebec Superior Court to request that the judgment at Rome be given effect in Quebec.

On 30 March, in a judgment cited 20 RJQ (CS) 338, Justice John Sprott Archibald of the Superior Court held that ecclesiastical authorities had no power to declare a marriage void in Quebec civil law—and therefore that the marriage was valid in Quebec.

== Sources ==
- The Delpit Case. Montreal: Charles Hébert. 1901. ISBN 9780659908971. OCLC 1042118581.
