= Louise Delpit =

French academic

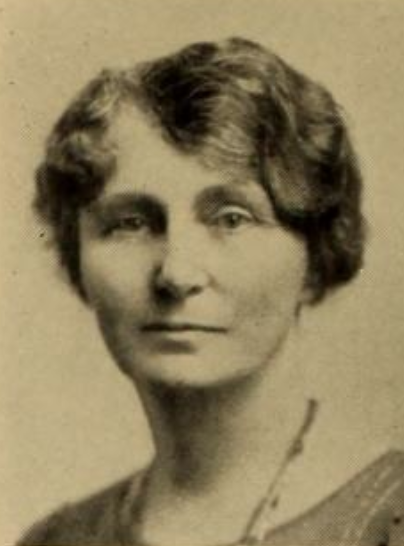
- Louise Delpit, from the 1929 yearbook of Smith College
- Born: 1870s Beaumont-du-Perigord, France
- Died: March 27, 1954; France
- Occupation(s): Professor of French language and literature
- Relatives: Albert Delpit (uncle)

Louise Delpit (1870s – March 27, 1954) was a French educator. She was a professor of French language and literature at Smith College from 1908 to 1940, and did relief work in France during World War I.

== Early life and education ==
Delpit was born in Beaumont-du-Perigord, France, one of the six children of Édouard Delpit and Joséphine Charrier Delpit. Her father and his brother Albert Delpit were both writers born in New Orleans. She graduated from the College Sévigné in Paris.

== Career ==
Delpit taught at the Brearley School in New York City from 1900 to 1904, and at the Baldwin School near Philadelphia from 1904 to 1906. She became a professor of French at Smith College in 1908. She was a scholar of French theatre, and acted in campus productions of French plays. She supervised Smith students on study trips in Paris. She was a member of the American Association of University Professors. She retired in 1940.

"Hers was the dignity and refinement of a bygone age," recalled Marjorie Hope Nicolson at the time of Delpit's retirement. "In her bearing, in her speech, and in her attitude she has exemplified the decorum, the restraint, and the self-control of the great classical period, yet she possessed also the quick wit, the mind, and the fundamental charm of the great period whose literature she loved."

In 1914, Delpit received the palmes academiques from the French government, for distinguished work in the field of education. During World War I, Delpit raised funding for relief work, returned to France, and with her mother and siblings organized a village hospital in her hometown.

== Publications ==
- L'Age d'Or de la Litterature Francaise (1909)
- Paris-théâtre contemporain: Rôle Prépondérant des Scènes d'Avant - Garde depuis Trente Ans (1925)
- Representative contemporary French lyrics, 1885-1925 (1927)
- Paris-théâtre contemporain: deuxième partie (1938)

== Personal life ==
Delpit died in France, in 1954, around the age of 80.
