= Albert Delpit =

French novelist and playwright (1849 – 1893)

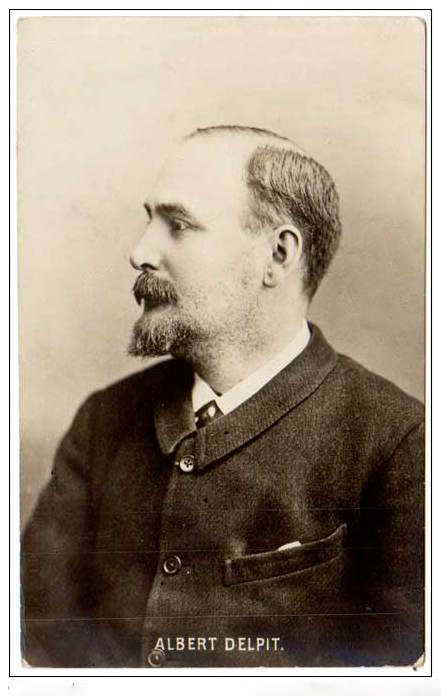
- Born: January 30, 1849; New Orleans, United States
- Died: January 4, 1893 (aged 43); Paris, France
- Occupations: Novelist, playwright
- Relatives: Louise Delpit (niece)
- Writing career
- Period: 19th century
- Notable works: Les Malédictions, L'Invasion 1870, Jean-nu-pieds, La Famille Cavalié, La Marquise
- Notable awards: Legion of Honour, Prix Montyon, Prix de poésie de l'Académie française

Albert Delpit (January 30, 1849 – January 4, 1893) was a French novelist and playwright.

== Biography ==
Born in 1849 in New Orleans, Albert Delpit was the son of a wealthy tobacco merchant, Jean Adrien Delpit (1806–1883), and Marie Félicité Plaix (1822–1876). He came to France at a young age to study in Paris and Bordeaux. He initially worked for magazines established by Alexandre Dumas père, such as Le Mousquetaire and Le d’Artagnan, while beginning to write his own works.

During the Franco-Prussian War of 1870, he served voluntarily and wrote a collection of verses titled L’Invasion (1870), which achieved great success. The French Academy awarded him the Prix Montyon in 1871, the Prix de poésie in 1873, and the Prix Vitet in 1880. His American nationality saved him from death during the Paris Commune; he served as an aide-de-camp to Admiral Saisset, who attempted mediation. In 1883, he engaged in a duel with Alphonse Daudet, accusing him of various literary offenses.

Delpit became a French citizen in 1892. He died on January 5, 1893, at his residence in the 8th arrondissement of Paris, and was buried in the Montmartre Cemetery (28th division).

== Works ==
=== Novels ===
- Les Malédictions (1869)
- L'Invasion 1870 (1870)
- Jean-nu-pieds, chronique de 1832 (1874)
- La Famille Cavalié (1878)
- La Marquise (1882)

=== Plays ===
- L'Apothéose de Lamartine (1869)
- La Voix du maître (1870)
- Le Fils de Coralie (1880)
- Le Père de Martial (1883)
- Mademoiselle de Bressier (1887)
- Passionnément (1891)

=== Poetry ===
- Le Repentir, récit d'un curé de campagne (1873)
- La Vieillesse de Corneille (1877)
- Sur les bords de la Nonnette et de la Beuvronne (1886)

=== Others ===
- La Volonté nationale (1870)
- Huit jours d'histoire : le commandement de l'amiral Saisset du 19 au 25 mars 1871 (1871)
- Boj srdce mateřského (1886)
