= Family Groove =

Studio album by the Neville Brothers
- Released: May 5, 1992
- Studio: New Orleans Recording Company, Louisiana
- Genre: R&B
- Length: 56:25
- Label: A&M
- Producer: The Neville Brothers, David Wolinski, David Leonard

The Neville Brothers chronology
Brother's Keeper (1990)	Family Groove (1992)	Mitakuye Oyasin Oyasin/All My Relations (1995)

Professional ratings
Review scores
Source	Rating
AllMusic	3/5 stars
Calgary Herald	B+
Orlando Sentinel	3/3 stars

Family Groove is the sixth studio album by the Neville Brothers. Rose of Sharon Witmer writes in her AllMusic review, "This is vintage Neville Brothers philosophy delivered as always with the funky beat and unique Neville sound that has captivated fans all over the world."

== Track listing ==
No.	Title	Writer(s)	Length
1.	"Fly Like an Eagle"	Steve Miller	4:45
2.	"One More Day"	Cyril Neville; David "Hawk" Wolinski; Gaynielle Neville	5:17
3.	"I Can See it in Your Eyes"	Aaron Neville; Ivan Neville	4:55
4.	"Day to Day Thing"	Phil Roy; Bob Thiele Jr.; Billy Valentine	4:54
5.	"Line of Fire"	Art Neville; Eric Kolb; Chuck Sheefel; Dwayne St. Romaine; Ron Cuccia	4:25
6.	"Take Me to Heart"	Cyril Neville; David Foreman	3:48
7.	"It Takes More"	Phil Roy; Bob Thiele Jr.; Billy Valentine	4:46
8.	"Family Groove"	Cyril Neville; Gerald Tillman; Omari Neville; Eric Kolb	4:48
9.	"True Love"	Art Neville; Daryl Johnson; David "Hawk" Wolinski	3:35
10.	"On the Other Side of Paradise"	Art Neville; Cyril Neville; Eric Kolb	3:45
11.	"Let My People Go"	Phil Roy; Bob Thiele Jr.; Billy Valentine	5:50
12.	"Saxafunk"	Charles Neville; David "Hawk" Wolinski	3:08
13.	"Maori Chant"	Traditional	2:29
Total length:			56:25

== Personnel ==
Musicians

- Aaron Neville – vocals
- Art Neville – keyboards, vocals
- Cyril Neville – percussion, vocals
- Charles Neville – saxophone
- Willie Green – drums
- Tony Hall – bass
- Eric Struthers – guitar
- David "Hawk" Wolinski – keyboards, guitar, drums
- John Moore – guitar on track 7
- Daryl Johnson – rhythm guitar, backing vocals on track 8
- Jason Neville – rap on track 2
- Steve Miller – guitar, vocals on track 1
- Mervin Campbell – trumpet
- Curtis Watcon – trumpet
- Emanuel Steib – trombone
- Greg Tardy – tenor saxophone
- Ricky Caesar – tuba

Production

- Producer: David "Hawk" Wolinski, David Leonard, the Neville Brothers
- Recording and mixing: David Leonard
- Engineer assistant: Steve Homelfarb, Trina Shoemaker
- Mastering: Steve Hall, Wally Traugott
- Production manager and keyboard technician: Eric Kolb
- Production assistant: Dave Cheramie
- Drum technician: Kelsey Smith
- D-Drum technician: Guy Gelso
- Assistant keyboard technician: Michael Paz
- Design: Len Peltier, Peter Grant
- Art direction: Len Peltier
- Photography: Guzman

== Charts ==
Chart performance for Family Groove
Chart (1992)	Peak position
Australian Albums (ARIA)	70
Dutch Albums (Album Top 100)	71
German Albums (Offizielle Top 100)	46
New Zealand Albums (RMNZ)	11
Norwegian Albums (VG-lista)	13
Swedish Albums (Sverigetopplistan)	29
Swiss Albums (Schweizer Hitparade)	11
