= Eric Johanson =

American guitarist and musician from Louisiana

- Born: Alexandria, Louisiana, United States
- Genres: Blues rock
- Occupation(s): Singer, guitarist, songwriter
- Instrument(s): Vocals, guitar
- Years active: 2000s–present
- Website: https://www.ericjohanson.com/

Eric Johanson is an American blues rock singer, guitarist, and songwriter. Johanson has performed with Tab Benoit, Cyril Neville, Anders Osborne, the Neville Brothers, Terrance Simien, JJ Grey, Eric Lindell, Mike Zito, and at events including the Chicago Blues Festival, Edmonton Blues Festival, New Orleans Jazz & Heritage Festival, and the Byron Bay Bluesfest (Australia).

== Life and career ==
He was born and raised in Alexandria, Louisiana, United States, and was presented with his first guitar when he was five years old. He heard blues music regularly through performances by his family members; one grandfather was a piano tuner and jazz clarinetist, his grandmother was a pianist, and he had aunts proficient on cello and bass. Johanson also acquired a passion for the hard rock recordings of Metallica, Megadeth, and White Zombie. He played in a local blues band before traveling regularly to New Orleans in his mid-teens, to avail himself of the opportunity to play with more mature and capable musicians. He later relocated there and graduated from the University of New Orleans.

Johanson became part of the local music scene in New Orleans but, when Hurricane Katrina struck that area in August 2005, he lost his home and nearly all of his possessions. The trauma of the event led to Johanson emigrating to New Zealand in 2006. He returned to New Orleans in 2010, and became an in-demand session musician for artists including Cyril Neville, Anders Osborne, and the Neville Brothers. He also played in the bands of Terrance Simien and Corey Henry's Treme Funktet. In 2017, Johanson's reputation came to the attention of Tab Benoit, who signed Johanson to his own Whiskey Bayou Records record label. Johanson's debut album, Burn It Down, which included percussion on the recording by Benoit and was produced and engineered by the latter, was released in October that year. It contained 10 original numbers plus Johanson's version of the Chuck Berry penned, "Oh Louisiana". For most of the next two years, Johanson toured with Benoit as part of the Whiskey Bayou Revue. In January 2019, Nola Blue Records issued a duet album, featuring Johanson and his long lost, then re-united, first cousin, Tiffany Pollack, entitled Blues in My Blood. The same year, Johanson took part in a jam concert with the North Mississippi Allstars's Luther Dickinson, at the New Orleans Jazz & Heritage Festival.

In early 2020, Johanson signed a recording contract with Nola Blue Records. This led to him to his next album, Below Sea Level, which was recorded at Zebra Ranch Studios in the North Mississippi hill country. In addition to Johanson's guitar and vocals, it saw Cody Dickinson play drums, Terrence Grayson on bass, and Ray Jacildo adding a Hammond organ contribution to one track. The collection had all 12 tracks penned by Johanson. Produced by Luther Dickinson, Below Sea Level was released on September 18, 2020. The album's title and one of the tracks therein, "Buried Above Ground", are homages to New Orleans. Johanson stated, "The title of the song refers to the fact that people are typically 'Buried Above Ground' in New Orleans, due to the high water table and the fact that much of the city is actually below sea level. The song itself is an expression of the journey I've been through with the city, leaving and coming back, and figuring out this is where I need to be".

Like many, Johanson had to re-think his approach during the COVID-19 pandemic in the United States. He decided to issue a weekly, acoustic, live stream of songs, covering a diverse range of music genres, based on social media interaction and requests between Johanson and his fan base. Johanson utilised several high-tech audio recording gadgetry to give an authentic and crystal clear sound quality, including using Pro Tools, noting that the online competition was strong for such a venture. One of the songs tackled was Johanson's resonator guitar rendition of Nine Inch Nails', "Head Like a Hole". In late 2020, Johanson, having had positive feedback from his streamed service, noted "I'm working right now on a little release of acoustic covers. Yeah, which I hope to have out in the spring. Partially that's from requests I've had from a lot of people that have been watching the livestream every week. I thought, let’s do it, it’s a good thing to do in between albums while I’m thinking about the next one coming together".

The demand led to the issue of Covered Tracks, Vol. 1 and Covered Tracks, Vol. 2, in early 2021. The collection housed Johanson's acoustic interpretations of a diverse mix of material including a rendition of Chicago's hit single, "25 or 6 to 4", the evergreen "The House of the Rising Sun" plus Gregg Allman's "Midnight Rider". Other songs reformulated were The Cardigans' "Feathers and Down", Taj Mahal's "Lovin' in My Baby's Eyes", with the Willie Dixon penned "My Babe", along with the Neville Brothers' "Yellow Moon", the Beatles' "And I Love Her", plus older source material such as Mississippi Fred McDowell's "Goin' Down to the River" and the jazz standard, "My Melancholy Baby".

In the early part of 2022, Johanson issued the double live album, Live at DBA: New Orleans Bootleg. Four of his albums have all made a top ten slot in the Billboard Top Blues Albums Chart. These are Below Sea Level, Covered Tracks: Vol. 1, Covered Tracks: Vol. 2, and Live at DBA: New Orleans Bootleg. One of his more recent contributions was as a guest guitarist on Monk Boudreaux's 2021 album, Bloodstains & Teardrops. In 2023, Johanson released The Deep and the Dirty on Ruf Records; a collection produced by Jesse Dayton. In August 2023, it entered the Billboard chart at number one.

Johanson has performed with Cyril Neville, Anders Osborne, the Neville Brothers, Terrance Simien, JJ Grey, Eric Lindell, Mike Zito, and at events including the Chicago Blues Festival, Edmonton Blues Festival, New Orleans Jazz & Heritage Festival, and the Byron Bay Bluesfest (Australia).

== Discography ==
=== Albums ===
Year	Title	Record label	Additional credits
2017	Burn It Down	Whiskey Bayou Records	
2019	Blues in My Blood	Nola Blue Records	Tiffany Pollack & Eric Johanson
2020	Below Sea Level	Nola Blue Records	
2021	Covered Tracks, Vol. 1	Self-released	
2021	Covered Tracks, Vol. 2	Self-released	
2022	Live at DBA: New Orleans Bootleg	Self-released	
2023	The Deep and the Dirty	Ruf Records	
2025	Live from Mississippi	Ruf Records	
