= Treacherous Too!: A History of the Neville Brothers, Vol. 2 (1955–1987) =

Treacherous Too!: A History of the Neville Brothers, Vol. 2 (1955-1987)

Compilation album by The Neville Brothers
- Released: February 1, 1991
- Genre: R&B
- Length: 58:09
- Label: Rhino

The Neville Brothers chronology
Brother's Keeper (1990)	Treacherous Too!: A History of the Neville Brothers, Vol. 2 (1955-1987) (1991)	Family Groove (1992)

Professional ratings
Review scores
Source	Rating
Allmusic	4.5/5 stars

Treacherous Too!: A History of the Neville Brothers, Vol. 2 (1955–1987) is the follow-up to Treacherous: A History of The Neville Brothers (1955–1985), also released by Rhino. William Ruhlmann of AllMusic writes in his review of the album that "the Neville Brothers had more than enough stray tracks from their decades of local music-making around New Orleans to justify this second, single-disc follow-up to Rhino's first Nevilles history."

== Track listing ==
No.	Title	Writer(s)	Performers	Length
1.	"Your Time's Up"	Lou Welsch; Ken Elliot; Frank Adams	The Hawketts	2:35
2.	"Oooh-Whee Baby"	Art Neville	Art Neville	2:11
3.	"What's Going On"	Seth David; Mac Rebennack	Art Neville	2:04
4.	"How Many Times"	Allen Toussaint	Aaron Neville	2:42
5.	"Humdinger"	Aaron Neville	Aaron Neville	2:41
6.	"Skeet Skat"	Allen Toussaint	Art Neville	2:44
7.	"Lover Of Love"	Allen Toussaint	Art Neville	2:35
8.	"Hook, Line And Sinker"	Eddie Bocage	Art Neville	2:37
9.	"Why Worry"	Lee Diamond; George Davis	Aaron Neville	2:35
10.	"Jailhouse"	Aaron Neville	Aaron Neville	3:16
11.	"She's On My Mind"	Leo Nocentelli	Aaron Neville	2:44
12.	"Tell Me What's On Your Mind"	Leo Nocentelli	Cyril Neville	2:52
13.	"Break Away"	Cyril Neville	The Neville Brothers	4:29
14.	"Mojo Hannah"	Mentor Williams; Marshall Paul	The Neville Brothers	5:31
15.	"Midnight Key"	Jimmy Buffett; Will Jennings; Michael Utley	The Neville Brothers	4:29
16.	"Drift Away"	Mentor Williams	The Neville Brothers	4:01
17.	"Spirits Of The World"	Joe Esposito; Richie Zito	The Neville Brothers	4:29
18.	"Wake Up"	Cyril Neville; Brian Stoltz	The Neville Brothers	3:34
Total length:				58:09

All track information and credits were taken from the CD liner notes.
