= Mitakuye Oyasin Oyasin/All My Relations =

Studio album by the Neville Brothers
- Released: 1996
- Label: A&M
- Producer: James Stroud, the Neville Brothers

The Neville Brothers chronology
Live on Planet Earth (1994)	Mitakuye Oyasin Oyasin/All My Relations (1996)	The Very Best of the Neville Brothers (1997)

Mitakuye Oyasin Oyasin/All My Relations is an album by the American musical group the Neville Brothers, released in 1996. Arvol Looking Horse allowed the Nevilles to use a Lakota phrase for the album's title. The band supported the album with a North American tour.

== Production ==
The album was coproduced by James Stroud. Ten members of the Neville extended family worked on the album; Cyril Neville was in part inspired to use family members after attending the Million Man March. Gaynielle Neville cowrote three of the songs. Bob Weir played guitar on the cover of the Grateful Dead's "Fire on the Mountain"; the song was nominated for a Grammy Award. Aaron Neville solos on the cover of Bill Withers's "Ain't No Sunshine". Charles Neville played saxophone on the album. Dann Huff played guitar. "You're Gonna Make Your Momma Cry" addresses a person addicted to crack cocaine.

== Critical reception ==
Professional ratings
Review scores
Source	Rating
AllMusic	3/5 stars
Calgary Herald	4/5 stars
Entertainment Weekly	B
The Guardian	3/5 stars
MusicHound Rock: The Essential Album Guide	3.5/5 stars
(The New) Rolling Stone Album Guide	2/5 stars
USA Today	3/4 stars
The Virgin Encyclopedia of R&B and Soul	3/5 stars

Entertainment Weekly noted that "when the Neville Brothers ignore their pair of aces—Mardi Gras music and Aaron’s ethereal warble—they come perilously close to generic funk." The Guardian called the album "a tasteful collection of eclectic tunesmithery with bouncy Caribbean beats, gospel-flavoured hymns and soulful ballads." The Fort Worth Star-Telegram considered it to be one of the group's best albums, writing that "the sound is strongly informed by the '70s soul of Hi Records." USA Today labeled the album "an incongruous mix of slick radio-aimed ballads and funky Afro-Caribbean jumpers."

AllMusic deemed Mitakuye Oyasin Oyasin/All My Relations "an album of small pleasures rather than the larger statement it seems intended to be."

== Track listing ==
No.	Title	Length
1.	"Love Spoken Here"
2.	"The Sound"
3.	"Holy Spirit"
4.	"Soul to Soul"
5.	"Whatever You Do"
6.	"Saved by the Grace of Your Love"
7.	"You're Gonna Make Your Momma Cry"
8.	"Fire on the Mountain"
9.	"Ain't No Sunshine"
10.	"Orisha Dance"
11.	"Sacred Ground"
