= Uptown (Neville Brothers album) =

Studio album by the Neville Brothers
- Released: March 1987
- Label: EMI America
- Producer: Jim Gaines (executive producer)

The Neville Brothers chronology
Treacherous: A History of the Neville Brothers (1986)	Uptown (1987)	Yellow Moon (1989)

Uptown is an album by the American musical group the Neville Brothers, released in 1987. The album's title is an homage to the New Orleans neighborhood in which the Nevilles grew up. The group supported the album by touring with Santana.

The album peaked at No. 155 on the Billboard 200.

== Production ==
After four commercially unsuccessful albums, the Nevilles brought in outside writers, producers, and musicians, including Jerry Garcia, Branford Marsalis, and Keith Richards. The album was overseen by Jim Gaines, then best known as Huey Lewis's producer, who agreed to executive produce only if he was allowed to make a "non-traditional" New Orleans album. Uptown was recorded in Metairie, Louisiana.

"Midnight Key" was cowritten by Jimmy Buffett. Clive Langer and Alan Winstanley also contributed to the album.

== Critical reception ==
Professional ratings
Review scores
Source	Rating
AllMusic	2/5 stars
Robert Christgau	B+
The Encyclopedia of Popular Music	2/5 stars
MusicHound R&B: The Essential Album Guide	2.5/5 stars
The Rolling Stone Album Guide	1.5/5 stars
Windsor Star	B+

Spin wrote: "By stripping them of all but the most subtle New Orleansisms, the Nevilles sound like Journey. Or Rick Springfield. Or instant mashed potatoes." Robert Christgau thought that "between adult themes, solidly insinuating tunes, uncommonly grizzled vocals, and faint indigenous lilt, what we have here is a pretty damn good [Contemporary Hit Radio] album."

The Globe and Mail considered that "the long-term pleasures come from Art Neville's rock steady keyboards and growling voice." USA Today thought that "the undistinquished playing offers little of the funky fire that has made the Nevilles New Orleans' top rhythm band." The Star Tribune opined that, "at best, this slick production evokes vintage Tower of Power with a Southern accent; at worst, it's as bland as the made-for-radio barroom-rock 'n' soul of Huey Lewis."

AllMusic wrote that the album contains the group's "usual tight playing and exuberant collective vocals." The Rolling Stone Album Guide panned the use of "sequencers and electronic percussion."

== Track listing ==
No.	Title	Length
1.	"Whatever It Takes"	3:51
2.	"Forever ... For Tonight"	4:13
3.	"You're the One"	4:21
4.	"Money Back Guarantee (My Love Is Guaranteed)"	4:35
5.	"Drift Away"	3:58
6.	"Shek-A-Na-Na"	3:59
7.	"Old Habits Die Hard"	3:46
8.	"I Never Needed No One"	3:57
9.	"Midnight Key"	4:24
10.	"Spirits of the World"	4:26

== Personnel ==
- Aaron Neville — vocals
- Cyril Neville — vocals, percussion
- Charles Neville — saxophone
- Art Neville — keyboards, vocals
- Brian Stoltz — guitar; piano on "Shek-A-Na-Na"
- Daryl Johnson — bass, backing vocals; synthesizer on "Whatever It Takes"
- Willie Green — drums

Additional musicians

- Branford Marsalis — saxophone on "Drift Away", "I Never Needed No One", "Midnight Key" and "Spirits of the World"
- Ronnie Montrose — guitar on "Whatever It Takes"
- Carlos Santana — guitar on "Forever ... For Tonight"
- Jerry Garcia — guitar on "You're the One"
- Richie Zito — guitar on "Spirits of the World"
- Keith Richards — rhythm guitar on "Midnight Key"
- Clem Clempson — sitar on "Old Habits Die Hard"
- Cory Lerios — keyboards on "Forever ... For Tonight", "You're the One" and "Money Back Guarantee (My Love Is Guaranteed)"
- Eric Kolb — keyboards
- Steve Nieve — keyboards on "Old Habits Die Hard"
- Luis Jardim — percussion on "Shek-A-Na-Na"
