= The Wild Tchoupitoulas (album) =

Studio album by the Wild Tchoupitoulas
- Released: 1976
- Recorded: Sea-Saint, New Orleans
- Genre: Mardi Gras Indian music
- Length: 35:15
- Label: Mango
- Producer: Allen Toussaint, Marshall Sehorn, Art Neville, Charles Neville

The Wild Tchoupitoulas is a 1976 album by the New Orleans Mardi Gras Indian tribe the Wild Tchoupitoulas. While not a commercial success, the album was well received critically and the experience recording it encouraged the four Neville brothers to perform together for the first time as a group.

== Background ==
The word Tchoupitoulas is derived from the name of an Indian tribe and is believed to mean "those who live at the river". According to Library of Congress, "Since the 19th century, bands of African-Americans in New Orleans have masqueraded as American Indians during Mardi Gras. They wear elaborate, homemade costumes planned and constructed throughout the year preceding the celebration, and take to the streets chanting merry boasts about their tribes. Their music is one of the many rich strands of New Orleans music, and Indians themselves are celebrated in many songs originating in the city."

== Music and lyrics ==
The album features the "call-and-response" style chants typical of Mardi Gras Indians. Vocals were provided by George Landry, as "Big Chief Jolly", as well as other members of his Mardi Gras tribe. Instrumentation was provided in part by members of the New Orleans band the Meters. The album also features Landry's nephews and the Neville Brothers providing harmonies and some instrumentation. Meaningful of the geographic location of New Orleans as a Caribbean city, "Meet de Boys on the Battlefront" is based on the melody and rhythm of Trinidadian calypso artist Lord Invader's 1943 "Rum and Coca Cola" made famous in the U.S. by the Andrews Sisters in 1944.

== Critical reception ==
Professional ratings
Review scores
| Source | Rating |
|---|---|
| AllMusic | 5/5 stars |
| Christgau's Record Guide | A |

In 2012, the album was added to the U.S. Library of Congress' National Recording Registry, a designation of "cultural, artistic and historic importance to the nation's aural legacy."

Reviewing in AllMusic, Stephen Erlewine ranked the album among New Orleans greats and wrote: the group "locks into an extraordinary hybrid that marries several indigenous New Orleans musics, with swampy, dirty funk taking its place in the forefront. There are only eight songs, and they are all strung together as if they're variations on the same themes and rhythms. That's a compliment, by the way, since the organic, flowing groove is the key to the album's success."

Robert Christgau placed the album on his top six New Orleans classics list. He called the music "ecstatic" and "celebratory". Reviewing in Christgau's Record Guide (1981), he wrote: "Here we have eight songs about dressing up in Indian costume on Mardi Gras; many of them are also about fighting with other Indians. You've probably heard the [Louisiana Creole] before, and maybe the irresistible melodic elements, too, although I can't tell any more, because I've played this 'repetitive' record so many times it sounds like where they all started (which it may be). For a while, I believed side two inferior, but eventually a longing for 'Big Chief Got a Golden Crown' set in and now I prefer it for listening. Side one is the best non- (or anti-) disco dance music in years."

== Track listing ==
All tracks composed by George Landry, except as noted.

| No. | Title | Writer(s) | Length |
|---|---|---|---|
| 1. | "Brother John" | Cyril Neville | 3:37 |
| 2. | "Meet de Boys on the Battlefront" | melody and rhythm based on Rupert Westmore Grant aka Lord Invader's "Rum and Coca Cola" | 3:24 |
| 3. | "Here Dey Come" | | 4:07 |
| 4. | "Hey Pocky A-Way" | Art Neville, Ziggy Modeliste, Leo Nocentelli, George Porter | 3:59 |
| 5. | "Indian Red" | | 7:21 |
| 6. | "Big Chief Got a Golden Crown" | | 4:01 |
| 7. | "Hey Mama (Wild Tchoupitoulas)" | | 4:46 |
| 8. | "Hey Hey (Indians Comin')" | George Landry, Cyril Neville | 4:00 |

== Personnel ==
Credits adapted from AllMusic and Louisiana Music Factory.

Composition and arrangement

- George Landry – composer
- Art Neville – arrangement
- Charles Neville – arrangement

Vocals and tribe roles

- Big Chief Jolly – George Landry
- Second Chief – Norman Bell
- Trail Chief – Booker T. Washington
- Flag Boy – Candy Hemphill "Carl" Christmas
- Spy Boy – Amos Landry

Performance

- Art Neville – keyboards, background vocals, producer, composer (track 4)
- Charles Neville – percussion, background vocals, producer
- Cyril Neville – congas, background vocals, composer (tracks 1, 8)
- Aaron Neville – piano, background vocals
- Ziggy Modeliste – drums, composer (track 4)
- Leo Nocentelli – guitar, composer (track 4)
- George Porter Jr. – bass, composer (track 4)
- Teddy Royal – guitar
- Willie Harper – background vocals

Production

- Allen Toussaint – producer
- Marshall Sehorn – producer
- Roberta Grace – engineer
- Ken Laxton – engineer, remastering, remixing
- Paul A. Howrilla – album jacket design and photography
- Carleatis – artwork
- Photographique Studios – design
- Ruth Kaplan – CD art adaptation

== See also ==
Rumble: The Indians Who Rocked the World
