= The Tattooed Heart =

Studio album by Aaron Neville
- Released: April 18, 1995
- Studios: Ocean Way (Hollywood, California); World Famous Flamingo (Los Angeles, California); Dinosaur (New Orleans, California); Sound Stage (Nashville, Tennessee)
- Genres: Pop, soul, country
- Length: 54:33
- Label: A&M
- Producers: Steve Lindsey; Keith Stegall

Aaron Neville chronology
Aaron Neville's Soulful Christmas (1993)	The Tattooed Heart (1995)	To Make Me Who I Am (1997)

The Tattooed Heart is an album by the American musician Aaron Neville, released in 1995. The first single was "Can't Stop My Heart from Loving You (The Rain Song)", which Neville sang on an episode of All My Children. The album peaked at No. 64 on the Billboard 200. It sold more than 500,000 copies. Neville promoted the album by touring with his brothers.

== Production ==
The album was produced by Steve Lindsey, with additional production by Keith Stegall on tracks 9 and 12. "Use Me" is a cover of the Bill Withers song. Aaron's brothers Charles and Cyril sang on the song. "For the Good Times" is a cover of the Kris Kristofferson song; it contains backing vocals by Kelly Willis. "Crying in the Chapel" is a cover of the pop-gospel standard. Steve Cropper played guitar on the album.

== Critical reception ==
Professional ratings
Review scores
Source	Rating
The Encyclopedia of Popular Music	2/5 stars
The Indianapolis Star	2.5/4 stars
Los Angeles Times	2.5/4 stars
MusicHound Rock: The Essential Album Guide	2.5/5 stars
(The New) Rolling Stone Album Guide	3/5 stars

The Guardian wrote that the songs "are nothing special but Neville transcends their flaws." Newsday opined that "Neville's new release purports to be classic pop soul with country and gospel elements, but what it really calls to mind is the kind of mid-'70s soft rock exemplified by Art Garfunkel's Breakaway and Boz Scaggs' Silk Degrees." The Kingston Whig-Standard labeled The Tattooed Heart "a classic easy-listening soul album." The Indianapolis Star concluded that "Neville conveys more commercial savvy than passion."

The Hartford Courant called Neville's voice "a glider of an instrument, amazingly pure and angelically lilting." The Hamilton Spectator deemed the album "a pleasant mixture of adult contemporary and country." The Vancouver Sun determined that "Neville's airy wail sails free and clear of all snags and almost mesmerizes the listener into a restful half-sleep." The Los Angeles Times considered the album to be a "seamless collection of stylishly rendered lite soul, pop and country."

== Track listing ==
No.	Title	Writer(s)	Length
1.	"Can't Stop My Heart from Loving You (The Rain Song)"	Diane Warren	4:17
2.	"Show Some Emotion"	Andrew Gold, Brock Walsh, Greg Prestopino	4:35
3.	"Everyday of My Life"	Sharon Robinson	5:04
4.	"Down into Muddy Water"	Dennis Linde	3:39
5.	"Some Days Are Made for Rain"	Jon Lind, Phil Galdston	5:06
6.	"Try (A Little Harder)"	Holly Knight, Mike Chapman	4:10
7.	"Beautiful Night"	Greg Prestopino, Matthew Wilder	4:21
8.	"My Precious Star"	Bruce Roberts, Franne Golde	3:33
9.	"Why Should I Fall in Love"	Brock Walsh, Phil Galdston	4:05
10.	"Use Me"	Bill Withers	4:58
11.	"For the Good Times"	Kris Kristofferson	4:34
12.	"In Your Eyes"	Aaron Neville, Pamela Hayes	3:09
13.	"Crying in the Chapel"	Artie Glenn	3:02

== Personnel ==
- Aaron Neville – vocals
- Jim Cox – Wurlitzer electric piano (1, 4, 5), organ (1–3, 6, 8, 14), accordion (1), acoustic piano (2, 7, 8, 14), RMI piano (3), clavinet (10)
- Claude Gaudette – synth strings (1, 5, 7, 12)
- Barry Beckett – organ (9, 11, 12)
- Hargus "Pig" Robbins – acoustic piano (9, 11, 12)
- Steve Lindsey – organ (10)
- Art Neville – synthesizers (10)
- Dean Parks – guitars (1–6, 8, 13, 14), acoustic guitar (7, 10), electric guitar (9), guitar solo (9)
- Steve Cropper – guitars (2, 6), guitar solo (2), electric guitar (7)
- Waddy Wachtel – guitars (6)
- John Willis – acoustic guitar (9, 11, 12)
- Reggie Young – electric guitar (9, 11, 12)
- Brent Mason – electric guitar (11, 12)
- Paul Franklin – pedal steel guitar (9, 11, 12)
- Freddie Washington – bass (1–8, 10, 14)
- Glenn Worf – bass (9, 11, 12)
- John Robinson – drums (1)
- Ed Greene – drums (2–6, 8, 10, 14)
- Matt Chamberlain – drums (7)
- Eddie Bayers – drums (9, 11, 12)
- Luis Conte – percussion (1–8, 10, 14)
- Alan Estes – vibraphone (2, 3, 8, 14)
- Bill Reichenbach Jr. – trombone (1)
- Lon Price – horns (2, 4, 6)
- Bill Churchville – horns (2, 4, 6)
- Nick Lane – horns (2, 4, 6)
- Greg Smith – horns (2, 4, 6)
- Lee Thornburg – horns (2, 4, 6)
- Charles Neville – saxophone (10)
- Mickey Raphael – harmonica (4)
- Sid Page – violin (1, 5, 7, 12)
- Stuart Duncan – fiddle (9, 11), mandolin (12)
- David Campbell – string arrangements (1–3, 5–9, 12), string conductor (2, 3, 6, 8, 9), synth strings (10)
- Mort Lindsey – string arrangements and conductor (11)
- Steve Dorff – string arrangements and conductor (13)
- Alex Brown – backing vocals (1–7), vocal ad-libs (1, 4)
- Jim Gilstrap – backing vocals (1, 8, 14)
- Jackie Gouche – backing vocals (1–7)
- Khris Kellow – backing vocals (1, 3)
- Darryl Phinnessee – backing vocals (1, 8, 14)
- Sharon Robinson – backing vocals (1, 3)
- Gary Stockdale – backing vocals (1)
- Billy Valentine – backing vocals (1, 6)
- Mona Lisa Young – backing vocals (1–7)
- Dorian Holley – backing vocals (8)
- Cyril Neville – backing vocals (10)
- Kelly Willis – harmony vocal (11)
- Kevin Dorsey – backing vocals (14)
- Phillip Ingram – backing vocals (14)

Production

- David Anderle – executive producer
- Steve Lindsey – producer
- Keith Stegall – producer (11, 12)
- Gabe Veltri – recording (1–10, 13, 14)
- John Kelton – recording (11, 12)
- Koji Egawa – assistant engineer (1–10, 13, 14)
- John Hendrickson – assistant engineer (1–10, 13, 14)
- Richard Huredia – assistant engineer (1–10, 13, 14)
- Mark Ralston – assistant engineer (11, 12)
- Bill Schnee – mixing at Schnee Studios (North Hollywood, California)
- Doug Sax – mastering at The Mastering Lab (Hollywood, California)
- Julie Larson – project coordinator
- Roxane Stueve – production coordinator (11, 12)
- Chuck Beeson – art direction, design
- Rebecca Chamlee – design
- Victoria Pearson – photography
