= Tattooed Heart (disambiguation) =

Tattooed Heart is a 2016 album by Ronnie Dunn.

Tattooed Heart may also refer to:

- "Tattooed Heart", the title track from the Ronnie Dunn album
- "Tattooed Heart", a song by Ariana Grande from the album Yours Truly, 2013
- The Tattooed Heart, a 1995 album by Aaron Neville
