= Brother's Keeper (Neville Brothers album) =

1990 studio album by the Neville Brothers

Studio album by the Neville Brothers
- Released: August 7, 1990
- Studios: Ultransonic, New Orleans
- Genres: New Orleans R&B, soul, funk
- Length: 55:53
- Label: A&M
- Producers: Malcolm Burn, the Neville Brothers

The Neville Brothers chronology
| Yellow Moon (1989) | Brother's Keeper (1990) | Family Groove (1992) |

Professional ratings
Review scores
| Source | Rating |
|---|---|
| AllMusic | 3/5 stars |
| Select | 3/5 medals |

Brother's Keeper is the fifth studio album by the New Orleans band the Neville Brothers. It was released in 1990 on A&M Records.

The album features background vocals performed by Linda Ronstadt on "Fearless", as well as Buffy Sainte-Marie and Marva Wright on "Sons and Daughters."

== Critical reception ==
Cee Dee of Off Beat Magazine begins the review of Brother's Keeper with: "Set to hit the streets on August 7, The Nevilles' latest is probably the most-anticipated album in recent New Orleans history. And this album was well worth the wait."

Chris Willman of the LA Times concludes his review by saying that "the brothers have produced yet another keeper."

Curt Fields has mixed feelings about the album, and writes: "To be sure, there are some incandescent moments on Brother's Keeper, but they are fewer in number than the group's fans are accustomed to hearing."

- See original reviews for full articles. Links can be found in the references section of this article.

== Track listing ==
| No. | Title | Writer(s) | Length |
|---|---|---|---|
| 1. | "Brother Blood" | Charles Neville; Ron Cuccia | 4:34 |
| 2. | "Brother Jake" | Aaron Neville; Joel Neville; Cyril Neville; Art Neville; Charles Neville; Willie Green; Tony Hall; Renard Poché | 4:47 |
| 3. | "Steer Me Right" | Aaron Neville; Joel Neville; Cyril Neville; Art Neville; Charles Neville; Willie Green; Tony Hall; Malcolm Burn | 3:15 |
| 4. | "Fearless" (background vocals by Linda Ronstadt) | Gary Nicholson; Wally Wilson; Brian Stoltz | 4:12 |
| 5. | "Sons and Daughters" (background vocals by Buffy Sainte-Marie and Marva Wright) | Art Neville; Malcolm Burn; Lorraine Neville; Arthel Neville; Ian Neville | 5:02 |
| 6. | "Fallin' Rain" | Link Wray | 4:01 |
| 7. | "Jah Love" | Cyril Neville; Bono | 3:22 |
| 8. | "River of Life" | Cyril Neville; Darryl Johnson; Brian Stoltz | 5:19 |
| 9. | "Witness" | Cyril Neville; Hack Bartholomew; Willie Green | 4:04 |
| 10. | "My Brother's Keeper" | Aaron Neville; Joel Neville; Cyril Neville; Art Neville; Charles Neville; Willie Green; Tony Hall | 3:36 |
| 11. | "Sons and Daughters" (Reprise) | Art Neville; Malcolm Burn; Lorraine Neville; Arthel Neville; Ian Neville | 4:09 |
| 12. | "Mystery Train" | Sam Phillips; Herman Parker | 4:31 |
| 13. | "Bird On a Wire" | Leonard Cohen | 5:01 |
| Total length: | | | 55:53 |

- Track information and credits verified from the album's liner notes.

== Personnel ==
- Aaron Neville – vocals, keyboards, percussion
- Art Neville – vocals, keyboards
- Cyril Neville – vocals, percussion
- Charles Neville – vocals, saxophone, percussion, keyboards
- Willie Green – drums
- Tony Hall – bass, backing vocals
- Eric Struthers – guitar
- Leo Nocentelli – guitar
- Daryl Johnson – additional bass, guitar, keyboards, backing vocals
- Ronald Jones – additional drums
- Wally Wilson – keyboards on "Fearless"
- Brian Stoltz – acoustic guitar and keyboards on "Fearless"
- Bill Dillon – additional guitar on "Fearless"
- Daniel Lanois – additional guitar on "Fearless"
- Eugene Ross – additional guitar on "Witness"
- Herman "Hack" Bartholomew – trumpet, vocals and piano on "Witness"
- Renard Poché – trombone and guitar solo on "Brother Jake"
- Tim Green – tenor saxophone
- Fred Kemp – baritone saxophone
- Roger Lewis – baritone saxophone
- Reggie Houston – baritone saxophone
- Ivan Neville – vocals on "Brother Jake"
- Gaynielle Neville – backing vocals on "Brother Blood"
- Linda Ronstadt – backing vocals on "Fearless"
- Buffy Sainte-Marie – backing vocals on "Sons and Daughters"
- Marva Wright – backing vocals on "Sons and Daughters"
- Malcolm Burn – additional instruments and backing vocals
- Steve Jordan – vocals, additional drums, guitars, additional bass on "River of Life"
- Ken "Snakebite" Jacobs – baritone saxophone on "River of Life"
- George Sartin – guitar on "River of Life"
- Emanuel Steib – trombone on "River of Life"
- Charles Brady and Eric Colb – ideas and inspiration on "Sons and Daughters"

== Charts ==
Chart performance for Brother's Keeper
| Chart (1990) | Peak position |
|---|---|
| Australian Albums (ARIA) | 87 |
| Austrian Albums (Ö3 Austria) | 22 |
| Dutch Albums (Album Top 100) | 37 |
| German Albums (Offizielle Top 100) | 15 |
| New Zealand Albums (RMNZ) | 4 |
| Swedish Albums (Sverigetopplistan) | 48 |
| Swiss Albums (Schweizer Hitparade) | 5 |
| UK Albums (Official Charts) | 35 |
