= Yellow Moon (Neville Brothers album) =

1989 studio album by the Neville Brothers

Studio album by the Neville Brothers
- Released: March 1989
- Recorded: New Orleans
- Genres: New Orleans R&B, soul, funk
- Length: 52:40
- Label: A&M
- Producer: Daniel Lanois

The Neville Brothers chronology
Uptown (1987)	Yellow Moon (1989)	Brother's Keeper (1990)

Yellow Moon is an album by the Neville Brothers, released in 1989. The track "Healing Chant" won best pop instrumental performance at the 32nd (1989) Grammy Awards.

The album peaked at No. 66 on the Billboard 200.

== Production ==
Yellow Moon was produced by Daniel Lanois. It was recorded in New Orleans, in a vacated apartment.

== Critical reception ==
Professional ratings
Review scores
Source	Rating
AllMusic	4/5 stars
Robert Christgau	A
The Encyclopedia of Popular Music	4/5 stars
MusicHound Rock: The Essential Album Guide	3.5/5 stars
Orlando Sentinel	4/5 stars
Ottawa Citizen	5/5 stars
Q	5/5 stars
Rolling Stone	4/5 stars
(The New) Rolling Stone Album Guide	3.5/5 stars

Robert Christgau wrote: "Whether isolating rhythm-makers, adding electronic atmosphere, or recontextualizing 'natural'-seeming instrumental effects ... Lanois isn't afraid to go for drama, and while drama does have a way of palling eventually, the songs are worth the risk." Spin thought that "instead of running from the bayou backbeat ... the Nevilles let the funky rhythms flow where they may." USA Today opined that "cynics will say that Lanois has thrown out the baby with the bathwater, but that ignores the fact that 'My Blood' and 'Wild Injun' rock with subtlety, and that Yellow Moon is an adventurous stretch for a band that can boogie in its sleep."

== Track listing ==
1. "My Blood" (Daryl Johnson, Cyril Neville, Willie Green, Charles Moore) – 4:11
2. "Yellow Moon" (Aaron Neville) – 4:04
3. "Fire and Brimstone" (Link Wray) – 3:57
4. "A Change Is Gonna Come" (Sam Cooke) – 3:43
5. "Sister Rosa" (Daryl Johnson, Cyril Neville, Charles Moore) – 3:29
6. "With God on Our Side" (Bob Dylan) – 6:37
7. "Wake Up" (Cyril Neville, Brian Stoltz, Willie Green) – 3:21
8. "Voodoo" (Aaron Neville, Daryl Johnson, Cyril Neville, Brian Stoltz, Willie Green) – 4:26
9. "The Ballad of Hollis Brown" (Bob Dylan) – 5:45
10. "Will the Circle Be Unbroken" (A. P. Carter) – 5:16
11. "Healing Chant" (Aaron Neville, Tony Hall, Cyril Neville, Brian Stoltz, Willie Green) – 4:34
12. "Wild Injuns" (Aaron Neville, Tony Hall, Cyril Neville, Brian Stoltz, Willie Green) – 3:17

== Personnel ==
- Aaron Neville – vocals, percussion, additional keyboards
- Art Neville – vocals, keyboards
- Charles Neville – saxophones, backing vocals, percussion
- Cyril Neville – vocals, hand drums, percussion
- Brian Stoltz – guitar, backing vocals, additional percussion
- Tony Hall – bass, backing vocals, additional percussion
- Willie Green – drums, Chinese drum
- Brian Eno – keyboards, sound effects, vocals on "A Change Is Gonna Come"
- Daniel Lanois – guitar, keyboards, backing vocals
- Malcolm Burn – keyboards, guitar
- The Dirty Dozen Brass Band – horns
- Eric Kolb – keyboard programming
- Kenyatta Simon and Kufaru Mouton – percussion on "My Blood"
- Aashid Himmons and Terry Manual – keyboards on "Sister Rosa"
