= Blues in My Blood =

Studio album by Tiffany Pollack & Eric Johanson
- Released: February 15, 2019
- Genre: Southern Gothic, blues, blues rock
- Length: 46:03
- Label: Nola Blue Records
- Producer: Jack Miele, Brennt Arcedment (co-producer)

Tiffany Pollack chronology
Tiffany Pollack & Co. (EP) (2018)	Blues in My Blood (2019)	Bayou Liberty (2021)

Eric Johanson chronology
Burn It Down (2017)	Blues in My Blood (2019)	Below Sea Level (2020)

Professional ratings
Review scores
Source	Rating
Elmore Magazine	88/100

Blues in My Blood is the debut album of the team up of Tiffany Pollack and Eric Johanson, released on February 15, 2019, on Nola Blue Records.

== Background ==
Tiffany Pollack had been making music in New Orleans for a while, forming the band Beaucoup Crasseaux, then giving up music to pursue another career in the funeral industry and have children. She eventually returned to music, joining The Dapper Dandies and forming the jazz band Tiffany Pollack and Co. Pollack had been adopted at birth, and at age twenty-five was reunited with her biological family, where she discovered she was first cousin to blues-rock guitarist Eric Johanson, who was lead guitarist for Cyril Neville and Terrance Simien, and who had released his debut solo album Burn It Down in 2017. The cousins' mothers encouraged the two to work together. The two performed together at various locations, their first public performance was at the Arts Council of Central Louisiana's A-Town Jazz Series. From the recordings of that performance, Nola Blues Records offered them a deal to make an album together.

== Track listing ==
No.	Title	Writer(s)	Length
1.	"Blues in My Blood"	Tiffany Pollack, Eric Johanson, Jack Miele	3:54
2.	"Memories to Forget"	Johanson, Miele	4:49
3.	"Keep It Simple"	Pollack, Johanson	3:55
4.	"Michael"	Pollack, Miele	4:50
5.	"Diamonds on the Crown"	Johanson, Miele	3:06
6.	"No Expectations"	Mick Jagger, Keith Richards	3:34
7.	"Do I Move You?"	Nina Simone	3:29
8.	"Slave of Tomorrow"	Johanson	5:23
9.	"Get Lost with Me"	Johanson	4:52
10.	"River"	Joni Mitchell	3:34
11.	"If I Had a Hammer"	Pete Seeger, Lee Hays	4:37
Total length:			46:03

== Personnel ==
Musicians

- Tiffany Pollack - vocals
- Eric Johanson – vocals, guitar
- Jack Miele - additional guitar, percussion for "Blues in My Blood", "Memories to Forget", "Michael", "Diamonds on the Crown", "Slave of Tomorrow", and "River"
- Phil Wang – bass for "Keep It Simple", "No Expectations", "Do I Move You?", "Get Lost with Me", and "If I Had a Hammer"
- John Gros – organ, piano for "Blues in My Blood", "Keep It Simple", "No Expectations", "Do I Move You?", "Get Lost with Me", and "If I Had a Hammer"
- Brentt Arcement – drums, plus organ, piano, and percussion for "Blues in My Blood", "Memories to Forget", "Michael", "Diamonds on the Crown", "Slave of Tomorrow", and "River"
- Sean Carey – backing vocals for "If I Had a Hammer"
- Johnny Sansone - harmonica for "Memories to Forget"
- 504 Horns - brass for "Michael"

Production

- Jack Miele - producer, engineer, mixed at The Music Shed Studios in New Orleans, Louisiana
- Brentt Arcement - co-producer
- JP Therrien - assistant engineer
- Jeff Silcio - assistant engineer
- Joe Causey - mastering at Voyager Mastering
