= Minha Loja de Discos =

Brazilian television documentary series

Minha Loja de Discos (Portuguese pronunciation: [miɲa loʒa dɛ dʒiscos]; English: My Record Store) is a Portuguese-language television documentary series focusing on independent record stores and local music scenes in various cities. The series was produced by Ton Ton Films in partnership with Canal Bis, running for three seasons from 2013 to 2015.

== Synopsis ==
The first season of the documentary centered on the United Kingdom, the second season covered the United States, and the third season covered a variety of countries. Seasons consisted of 13 episodes, each dedicated to a different independent record store and its role within the local music scene. Interviewees included store owners, musicians, employees, and customers.

The series aired on the Brazilian TV channel Canal Bis, with the first season running from July to September 2013, the second from September to November 2014, and the third from September to November 2015.

The documentary was covered by Brazilian media outlets, including *O Globo* and *Folha de S.Paulo*.

The series was directed and produced by Elisa Kriezis and Rodrigo Pinto, with scripts by Kika Serra and Pedro Serra, and editing by Felipe David Baron.

== Seasons ==
=== First season: Minha Loja de Discos UK ===
The first season explored independent record stores in the United Kingdom, featuring interviews with store owners and musicians.

Featured stores:

- Record Store Day - UK
- Sister Ray - London
- Jumbo Records - Leeds
- Truck Store - Oxford
- Rough Trade - London
- Resident - Brighton
- Monorail - Glasgow
- Piccadilly Records - Manchester
- Rise - Bristol
- Sounds of the Universe - London
- The Diskery - Birmingham
- Phonica - London
- Spillers Records - Cardiff

Featured artists: The Maccabees, Franz Ferdinand, Portishead, Primal Scream, Alt-J, Peter Hook, Gang of Four, and more.

=== Second season: Minha Loja de Discos USA ===
The second season focused on North America, specifically independent record stores and music scenes in the United States.

Featured stores:

- Louisiana Music Factory - New Orleans
- Amoeba Music - Los Angeles
- Somewhere in Detroit - Detroit
- Jazz Record Mart - Chicago
- Waterloo Records - Austin
- Goner Records - Memphis
- Grimey's New and Preloved Music - Nashville
- Poobah Records - Los Angeles
- Academy Records - New York
- Aquarius Records - San Francisco
- Mississippi Records - Portland
- Hungry Ear Records - Honolulu
- Easy Street Records - Seattle

Featured artists: Jeff Mills, Carl Craig, Moby, OK Go, Animal Collective, Marky Ramone (Ramones), Lee Ranaldo (Sonic Youth), and others.

=== Third season: Minha Loja de Discos Worldwide ===
The third season took a global approach, covering record stores in various countries.

Featured stores:

- Pet Sounds - Stockholm
- Louie Louie - Lisbon
- Balades Sonores - Paris
- Smekkleysa - Reykjavik
- Baratos Afins - São Paulo
- Chico - Beirut
- Hard Wax - Berlin
- Third Ear - Tel Aviv
- RPM Records - Bogota
- Tropicalia Records - Rio de Janeiro
- Mercurio Disqueria - Buenos Aires
- Casa Brasilis - São Paulo
- Discos Bora Bora - Granada
