= The Deep and the Dirty =

Studio album by Eric Johanson
- Released: July 28, 2023
- Studio: Signal Hill Recording
- Genre: Blues rock
- Length: 47:49
- Label: Ruf
- Producer: Jesse Dayton, Rueben Williams (Executive), Thomas Ruf (Executive)

Eric Johanson chronology
Live at DBA: New Orleans Bootleg (2022)	The Deep and the Dirty (2023)

Professional ratings
Review scores
Source	Rating
American Songwriter	3.5/5 stars
Blues Rock Review	8.5/10 stars

The Deep and the Dirty is Eric Johanson's fourth studio album, and seventh overall album, released on July 28, 2023, on Ruf Records. The twelve songs on the album were recorded in two days, supported by bassist Eric Vogel and Grammy-winning drummer Terence Higgins.

Johanson's manager suggested Jesse Dayton to produce the album. Dayton had him play each track live about five times to figure out what worked and what didn't work. By the time the musicians recorded the tracks live in the studio, Johanson had the live experience of working with Dayton to draw upon, allowing him to dial in on the sound he wanted.

== Track listing ==
All tracks are written by Eric Johanson and Jesse Dayton unless otherwise noted

No.	Title	Writer(s)	Length
1.	"Don't Hold Back"	Johanson	4:06
2.	"The Deep and the Dirty"	Johanson	3:47
3.	"Beyond the Sky"	Johanson	3:45
4.	"Undertow"		3:22
5.	"Just Like New"		4:20
6.	"Elysian Fields"		4:21
7.	"Galaxy Girl"		3:30
8.	"Familiar Sounds"		4:12
9.	"Gets Me High"	Johanson	3:46
10.	"Stepping Stone"		3:40
11.	"Borrowed Time"	Johanson	4:14
12.	"She Is the Song"		4:46
Total length:			47:49

== Personnel ==
Musicians

- Eric Johanson – vocals, guitar
- Eric Vogel – bass
- Terrence Higgins – drums
- Patrick Herzfeld – shaker, tambourine
- Jesse Dayton – shaker, tambourine

Production

- Jesse Dayton - producer
- Reuben Williams - executive producer
- Thomas Ruf - executive producer
- Patrick Herzfeld - engineering & mixing
- Warren Defever - mastering at Third Man Mastering
