= David Leonard (music producer) =

American record producer

David Leonard is an American record producer and audio engineer.

== Production discography ==
- 1981: Chaka Khan – What Cha' Gonna Do for Me – co-engineer
- 1981: Go-Go's – Beauty and the Beat – mixing assistant
- 1982: Toto – Toto IV – co-engineer
- 1983: Go-Go's – Vacation – studio assistant
- 1985: Fishbone – Fishbone – co-engineer, mixer
- 1986: Fishbone – In Your Face – co-mixer
- 1986: Eddie Money – Can't Hold Back – co-engineer
- 1986: Various Artists – Quicksilver – engineer
- 1987: Sheena Easton – No Sound But a Heart – co-producer
- 1988: Michelle Shocked – Short Sharp Shocked – mixer
- 1988: Parthenon Huxley – Sunny Nights – mixer
- 1989: Belinda Carlisle – Runaway Horses – co-engineer
- 1989: The Outfield – Voices of Babylon – co-producer
- 1991: Susanna Hoffs – When You're a Boy – co-engineer, co-mixer
- 1992: The Men – The Men – producer and engineer
- 1992: Soul Asylum – Grave Dancers Union – co-mixer
- 1992: Sophie B. Hawkins – Tongues and Tails – co-mixer
- 1992: The Neville Brothers – Family Groove – producer, mixer, recorder
- 1993: Dwight Yoakam-This Time-mix engineer
- 1993: John Mellencamp – Human Wheels – co-producer
- 1994: Alison Moyet – Essex – co-mixer
- 1995: October Project – Falling Farther In – engineer
- 1997: Indigo Girls – Shaming of the Sun – co-producer
- 1998: Ace of Base – Cruel Summer – co-mixer
- 1998: Barenaked Ladies – Stunt – co-producer, co-engineer, co-mixer
- 1999: Moist – Mercedes 5 and Dime – producer
- 2000: Earthsuit – Kaleidoscope Superior – producer
- 2000: Hootie and the Blowfish – Scattered, Smothered and Covered – co-mixer
- 2000: Geddy Lee – My Favourite Headache – co-producer
- 2000: Tara MacLean – Live from Austin – producer, mixer
- 2001: Paul McCartney – Driving Rain – co-mixer
- 2001: Rustic Overtones – ¡Viva Nueva! – co-producer, co-engineer, co-mixer
- 2002: Rush – Vapor Trails – mixer
- 2004: Juliana Hatfield – In Exile Deo – co-producer
- 2004: k.d. lang – Hymns of the 49th Parallel – engineer, mixer
- 2004: Rush – Feedback – producer
- 2005: Audio Adrenaline – Until My Heart Caves In – producer
- 2006: Shaye – Lake of Fire – co-mixer
- 2008: k.d. lang – Watershed – co-engineer, mixer
- 2010: David Leonard – The Quickening – songwriter, artist
- 2023: John Mellencamp – Orpheus Descending – engineering, mixing

== Awards ==
- 1983 – Co-engineer of Best Engineered Album, Non-Classical – for Toto IV.
- 2006 – Producer of Best Rock Gospel Album – for Until My Heart Caves In.
