= Banjo & Sullivan: The Ultimate Collection =

Studio album by Banjo and Sullivan
- Released: June 28, 2005
- Recorded: Chop Shop Hollywood, CA
- Genre: Country
- Length: 32:24
- Label: Hip-O
- Producer: Jesse Dayton; Rob Zombie

Professional ratings
Review scores
Source	Rating
Allmusic	3/5 stars

Banjo & Sullivan: The Ultimate Collection is an album by Jesse Dayton and Lew Temple, recording as the fictional characters Banjo and Sullivan from Rob Zombie's 2005 American horror film The Devil's Rejects.

The album was conceived as a spin-off project inspired by on-set conversations between filmmaker Zombie and actor Lew Temple, who portrayed 'Adam Banjo' in the film. Soon after, Temple's long-time friend Jesse Dayton (an Austin, Texas-based alt-country musician and songwriter) was approached to helm the project as producer and bandleader with Temple and Dayton sharing songwriting credit.

The album is presented as a greatest hits compilation from the 1970s, contemporary with the film's setting.

== Track listing ==
1. "Dick Soup" – 2:27
2. "I Don't Give a Truck" – 2:45
3. "Honeymoon Song" – 3:26
4. "I'm at Home Getting Hammered (While She's Out Getting Nailed)" – 2:43
5. "Killer on the Lamb" – 3:54
6. "I'm Trying to Quit, but I Just Quit Trying" – 2:56
7. "She Didn't Like Me (But She Loved My Money)" – 3:19
8. "Roy's Ramble" – 2:29
9. "Lord, Don't Let Me Die in a Cheap Motel" – 3:08
10. "Free Bird" – 5:17

== Personnel ==
- Steve Chadie - Engineer, Mixing
- Jesse Dayton - Guitar (Acoustic), Bass, Guitar, Vocals, Percussion, Producer, Mixing
- Sara Hamilton - Background Vocals
- Gavin Lurssen - Mastering
- Riley Osbourne - Piano, Organ (Hammond), Fender Rhodes, String Arrangements
- Gene Page - Photography
- Renato Queden - Illustrations
- Dana Smart - Supervisor
- Elmo Sproat - Bass (Upright)
- Adam Starr - Product Manager
- Beth Stempel - Production Coordination
- Lew Temple - Lyrics (with Jesse Dayton)
- Brian Thomas - Banjo, Dobro, Pedal Steel
- Eric Tucker - Drums
- Jodie Wilson - Project Coordinator
- Rob Zombie - Executive Producer, Art Direction, Art Design
