= Bring It On Home... The Soul Classics =

Bring It On Home… The Soul Classics

Studio album by Aaron Neville
- Released: September 19, 2006
- Studio: C.R.C. Studios, Chicago, IL; Hiatus Studios, New York, NY; Ocean Way Recording, Hollywood, CA; Paragon Studios, Franklin, TN; Piety Street Recording, New Orleans, LA
- Genre: R&B
- Length: 54:48
- Label: Burgundy Records
- Producer: Stewart Levine

Aaron Neville chronology
Mojo Soul (2006)	Bring It On Home… The Soul Classics (2006)	I Know I've Been Changed (2010)

Professional ratings
Review scores
Source	Rating
AllMusic	4/5 stars
Robert Christgau	(2-star Honorable Mention)

Bring It On Home… The Soul Classics is an album by Aaron Neville, in which he covers several classic soul songs that were made popular from 1957 to 1971. The album was released September 19, 2006, and reached No. 20 on the Billboard Top R&B/Hip-Hop Albums chart and No. 38 on the Billboard 200 chart dated October 6, 2006.

== Track listing ==
No.	Title	Writer(s)	Original Artist	Length
1.	"Rainy Night in Georgia" (with Chris Botti)	Tony Joe White	Brook Benton (1969)	4:37
2.	"Ain't No Sunshine"	Bill Withers	Bill Withers (1971)	3:36
3.	"(Sittin' On) The Dock of the Bay"	Steve Cropper; Otis Redding	Otis Redding (1968)	4:25
4.	"Stand by Me"	Ben E. King; Jerry Leiber; Mike Stoller	Ben E. King (1961)	3:48
5.	"You Send Me"	Sam Cooke	Sam Cooke (1957)	4:12
6.	"Respect Yourself" (with Mavis Staples)	Luther Ingram; Mack Rice	The Staple Singers (1971)	4:04
7.	"When a Man Loves a Woman"	Calvin Lewis; Andrew Wright	Percy Sledge (1966)	3:21
8.	"Let's Stay Together" (with Chaka Khan)	Al Green; Willie Mitchell; Al Jackson Jr.	Al Green (1971)	4:01
9.	"It's All Right"	Curtis Mayfield	The Impressions (1963)	3:30
10.	"People Get Ready" (with Art Neville & David Sanborn)	Curtis Mayfield	The Impressions (1965)	4:04
11.	"My Girl"	William Robinson, Jr.; Ronald White	The Temptations (1964)	3:56
12.	"Ain't That Peculiar"	William Robinson, Jr.; Pete Moore; Bobby Rogers; Marv Tarplin	Marvin Gaye (1965)	3:38
13.	"A Change Is Gonna Come"	Sam Cooke	Sam Cooke (1964)	4:08
14.	"(Your Love Keeps Lifting Me) Higher and Higher" (Bonus Track)	Gary Jackson; Raynard Miner; Carl Smith	Jackie Wilson (1967)	3:28
Total length:				54:48

Track information and credits adapted from the album's liner notes.

== Personnel ==
Musicians

- Aaron Neville – vocals
- Neil Larsen – acoustic piano, electric piano, organ, arrangements, horn arrangements, string arrangements (7)
- Ray Parker Jr. – electric guitar, backing vocals (9)
- Heitor Pereira – acoustic guitar, electric guitar
- Freddie Washington – bass, backing vocals (9)
- James Gadson – drums, backing vocals (9)
- Dan Higgins – saxophones
- David Woodford – saxophones
- Lee Thornburg – trumpet
- Stewart Levine – arrangements
- Aaron Zigman – string arrangements (1–6, 8–14)

Additional musicians

- Joe Sample – acoustic piano (3–5, 8, 14), electric piano (3–5, 8, 14)
- Art Neville – organ (10)
- Jack Ashford – tambourine (3, 6, 9, 12, 14)
- Lenny Castro – percussion (4, 5, 8, 10, 11)
- David Sanborn – saxophone (10)
- Chris Botti – trumpet (1)
- Mavis Staples – vocals (6)
- Chaka Khan – vocals (8)
- Jason Neville – backing vocals (6, 9, 14)
- Aaron Neville, Jr. – backing vocals (6, 9, 14)
- Arnold McCuller – backing vocals (6, 10, 14)
- Lamont Van Hook – backing vocals (6, 10, 14)
- Fred White – backing vocals (6, 10, 14)
- The Dixie Cups – backing vocals (6, 9, 12, 14):
  - Barbara Anne Hawkins
  - Rosa Lee Hawkins
  - Athelgra Neville

== Production ==
- Joseph DiMuro – executive producer
- Stewart Levine – producer
- Rik Pekkonen – engineer, mixing
- Wesley Fontenot – engineer
- Mathieu LeJeune – engineer
- Dean Sharenow – engineer
- Matt Weeks – engineer
- Wesley Seidman – assistant engineer
- Bernie Grundman – mastering at Bernie Grundman Mastering (Hollywood, CA)
- Pete Ganbarg – A&R
- Rich Davis – production coordination
- Jennifer Liebeskind – project direction
- Tony Ward – project direction
- Jeff Schulz – art direction, design
- Danny Clinch – photography
- Kyoko Motonaga – grooming
- April Johnson – stylist
- David Ritz – sleeve notes
- Kent Sorrell – management

== Charts ==
Chart (2006)	Peak position
US Top R&B/Hip-Hop Albums (Billboard)	20
US Billboard 200	37
