= WWOZ =

Community radio station in New Orleans

Coordinates: 29.9571°N 90.0754°W

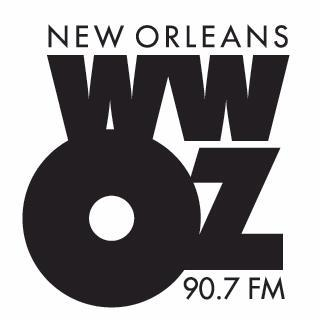
- New Orleans, Louisiana; United States
- Broadcast area: New Orleans metropolitan area
- Frequency: 90.7 MHz (HD Radio)
- Branding: WWOZ 90.7 FM

Programming
- Language: English
- Format: Jazz, Blues, New Orleans community music

Ownership
- Owner: New Orleans Jazz & Heritage Foundation; (Friends of WWOZ, Inc.)

History
- First air date: December 4, 1980
- Call sign meaning: The Wonderful Wizard of Oz

Technical information
- Licensing authority: FCC
- Facility ID: 22659
- Class: C1
- ERP: 100,000 watts
- HAAT: 134 meters (440 ft)

Links
- Public license information: Public file; LMS
- Webcast: Listen Live
- Website: WWOZ.org

WWOZ (90.7 FM) is a non-profit community-supported radio station in New Orleans. It is owned by the New Orleans Jazz & Heritage Foundation. The station specializes in music from or relating to the cultural heritage of New Orleans and the surrounding region of Louisiana. The playlist includes jazz, blues, local, regional and world music.

The studios and offices are in the Jackson Brewery building in the French Quarter of New Orleans. The transmitter is on Canal Street at Lasalle Street atop a Tulane University building.

== Programming ==
WWOZ programming is most heavily weighted toward contemporary jazz and rhythm & blues, with other programming including traditional jazz, blues, Cajun music, zydeco, old time and country music, bluegrass, Gospel, Celtic music and World music.

As the station is known for its support of local music, local musicians are often guests on programs and sometimes perform live over the air, especially for the station's twice-yearly membership drives. Musicians and singers such as Rob Cambre, Samirah Evans, Alan Fontenot, Bob French, Hazel the Delta Rambler, Sam Cammarata, Ernie K-Doe, Bobby Mitchell, Davis Rogan, Tom Saunders, John Sinclair, Don Vappie, Dr. Michael White and others have had their own shows on the station.

WWOZ is also known for its location broadcasts of live music events, including the annual New Orleans Jazz & Heritage Festival, co-owned with the station.

In 2018, WWOZ was honored with the Prestige Award for Station of the Year by the Louisiana Association of Broadcasters in recognition of its on-air programming, the large number of volunteer hosts, live music broadcasts, as well as its "WWOZ in the Schools" program.

== History ==
The founders of WWOZ were brothers Walter and Jerry Brock, from Texas, who thought New Orleans needed a community radio station and began organizing it in the mid-1970s. Jerry is also the co-founder of the Louisiana Music Factory and a record producer engaged in the works of various local artists. The Nora Blatch Educational Foundation (named after radio pioneer Nora Blatch, wife of Lee De Forest) was established as a non-profit organization to hold the station license. The call letters WWOZ were chosen as a reference to The Wonderful Wizard of Oz, and specifically the line, "Pay no attention to the man behind the curtain", meaning that attention should be given to the program content rather than the personalities of the disc jockeys.

The station began broadcasting on December 4, 1980 from a tiny transmitter building in Bridge City, Louisiana beneath their shared rented broadcast tower. A few months later the broadcasts moved to the space the station had been using in a dilapidated two-room apartment upstairs from the music club Tipitina's at Napoleon Avenue and Tchoupitoulas Street in Uptown New Orleans.

Conditions at WWOZ in the early 1980s were spartan. The studio and office had no air conditioning, and for a time just before moving out of the Tipitina's site, the only running water to the tiny bathroom was from a neighbor's garden hose run in through a window. Everyone who did a show volunteered hours of time on other tasks to keep the station going, from addressing envelopes to sweeping the floor. When artists performing live downstairs at Tipitina's gave their permission, their performances were broadcast via a microphone lowered through a hole in the floor. When permission to broadcast live performances downstairs could not be obtained, programming went to pre-recorded reel-to-reel tapes, as the music downstairs made it too loud in the studio to talk over the microphones and the vibrations made it impossible to use the station's turntables.

In 1985, WWOZ moved the studio to a building in Louis Armstrong Park in the Tremé neighborhood. With the station facing financial difficulties, in 1986 the license was transferred to the New Orleans Jazz & Heritage Foundation (parent organization of the New Orleans Jazz and Heritage Festival) which helped subsidize the operation. The station later added an office in a small house across St. Philip Street from the studio.

In 1996, the station began streaming their broadcast online, before this practice became common. In the same year, Better Than Ezra, an alternative rock band from New Orleans, released a song titled "WWOZ", where they mention this radio station.

=== Effects of Hurricane Katrina ===
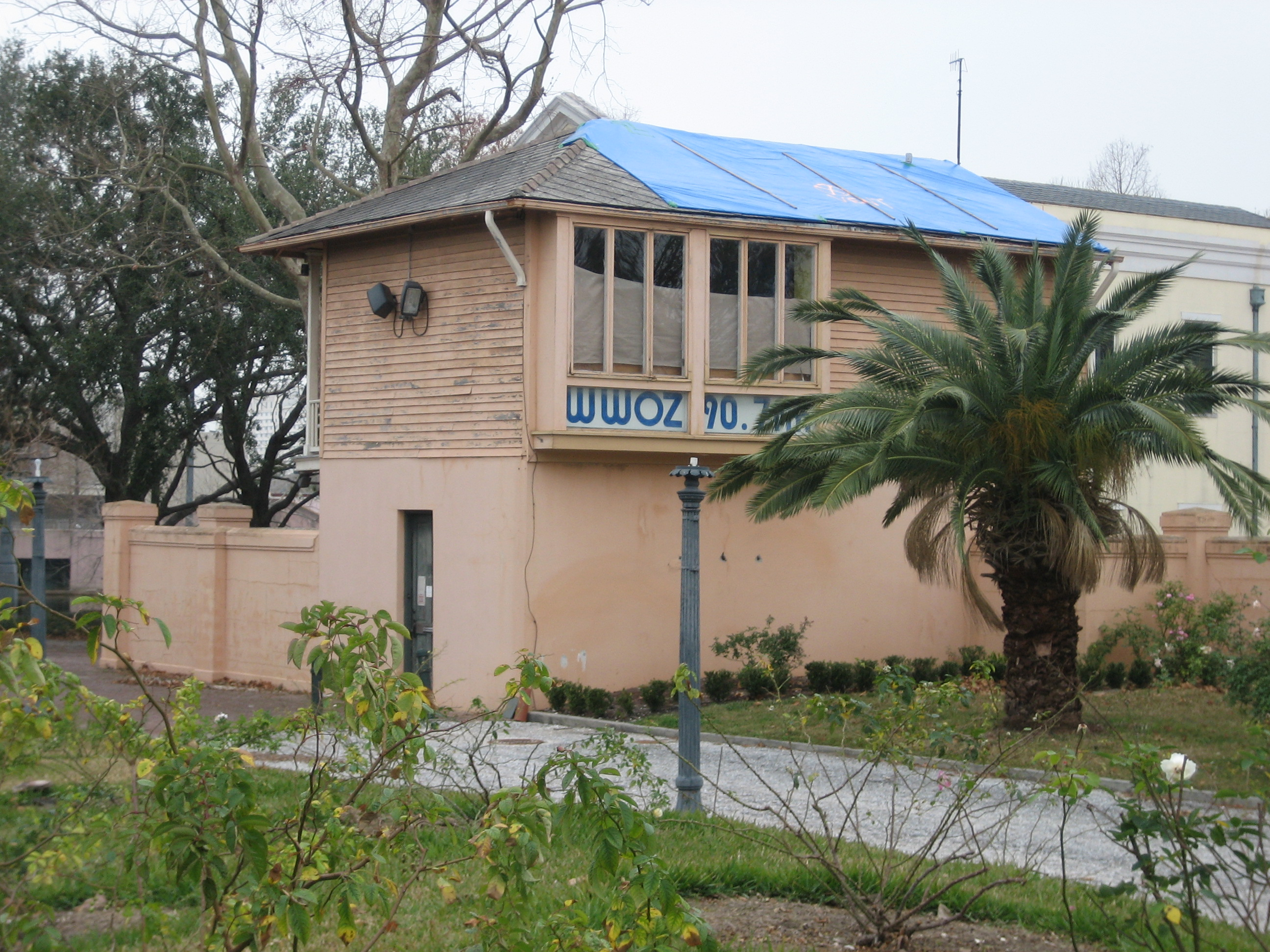
Former WWOZ studio after Hurricane Katrina, January 2006

WWOZ made the decision to go off the air at midnight on August 27, 2005, in anticipation of Hurricane Katrina to allow its programmers and staff to evacuate the city. It actually went off the air slightly earlier, just after 10 pm. The last song played before signing off that night was "What the Heck, Let’s Discotheque" by Side Effect, spun by DJ Soul Sister. In the storm the WWOZ studio suffered minor damage but the Park's power system was wiped out and not a repair priority in the big picture, while the WWOZ staff, like the rest of the New Orleans population, was scattered to shelter in several states. But the station's transmitter atop the Tidewater Building on Canal Street in downtown New Orleans was found to be intact and serviceable, given a studio source. Within a week WWOZ initiated a webcast as "WWOZ in Exile" via Internet servers at WFMU in New Jersey. Many long term listeners from around the country donated tapes of WWOZ broadcasts from years gone by, some of which were rebroadcast in part or whole. On October 18, 2005, WWOZ resumed limited hours of broadcasting over the air in New Orleans, via studio space provided by Louisiana Public Broadcasting in Baton Rouge, Louisiana. The station returned a physical studio to New Orleans in December 2005, using temporary office and studio space at the French Market office building, returning to its airwaves on 15 December.

Much of WWOZ's programming has long been based on the large personal record collections of the various programmers, many of which were lost in the disaster. For some time after the station returned to the air, one programmer did a series of shows entirely from CDs rescued from the debris in post-Katrina muck.

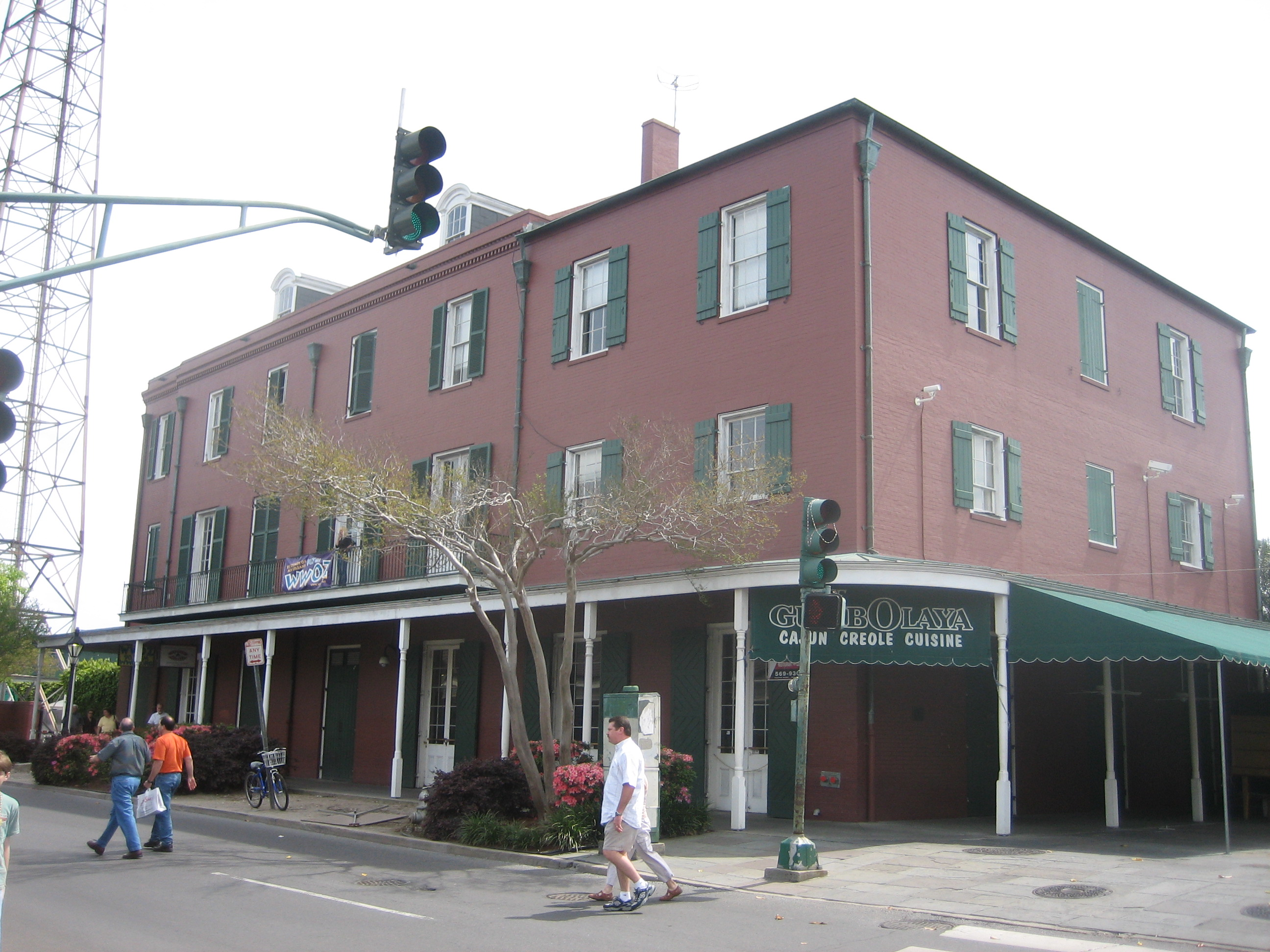
Post-Katrina WWOZ studios were on the second floor of this French Quarter building

At first, the French Quarter studio was expected to be a temporary arrangement for approximately a year. However agreements were made for WWOZ to use more space in the French Market office building for studio and office space, and WWOZ remained at this location, with supplemental offices at the New Orleans Healing Center and in Kenner, Louisiana.

WWOZ moved their studio and offices to the Jax Brewery on November 28, 2023, marking the occasion with a second line parade. They occupy the entire top (fifth) floor of the former brewery.

Pre-Katrina, thousands of hours of New Orleans music performances on tape via WWOZ were stored in a non-descript storage site. The floodwaters stopped at the storage container's loading dock and were not lost. The tapes were later shipped to the Library of Congress, which had previously named the WWOZ collection to its National Recording Registry. The Library agreed to store, catalog, and digitize the collection, a process which was expected to take many years to complete. By April 2016, the collection of over 2,000 recordings was made available to the public via walk-in listening in the Library's Recorded Sound Research Center in the Madison Building on Capitol Hill.

== Translator ==
In July 2021 a translator for WWOZ was granted, W270CS 101.9 Gulfport Mississippi. This translator was on the air from July 20, 2021 until Hurricane Ida flooded the transmitter site. The translator was built on a ham radio tower 30 yards away from the tower where it is licensed to broadcast from. In November 2021 W270CS filed an STA with the FCC to go silent due to an unspecified technical issue. Because the FCC frowns upon a station going silent within its first year on the air, a letter of inquiry was sent to the owner of W270CS in February 2022. The FCC wanted evidence that W270CS was constructed with the intent of not being on the air only temporarily. The only proof of the translator being on the air since the license was issued in September was a 6 hour test in March 2022 from a temporary site. The FCC was not satisfied with the response by the owner and deleted the license in June 2022.

== Show hosts ==
WWOZ's on-air show hosts are all volunteers and receive no compensation for the music that they play on the station, primarily playing from their personal collections of music. Most of them are deeply involved in the New Orleans music community and many are musicians. The station does have a small staff of paid personnel who handle the day-to-day operations of the station.

== Dramatized depictions of WWOZ ==
Fictionalized versions of WWOZ were featured on the HBO series Treme and some episodes of NCIS: New Orleans.

== See also ==
- List of jazz radio stations in the United States
- List of community radio stations in the United States
