= Daryl Johnson (musician) =

American singer

- Born: New Orleans, Louisiana, United States
- Genres: Funk, blues, folk, alternative rock, rock
- Occupations: Musician, bassist, singer, composer, songwriter, producer
- Instruments: Bass, recorder, vocals, drums, percussion

Daryl Johnson (born in New Orleans, Louisiana) is an American bass player, singer, songwriter, composer and producer. Johnson is well known for playing with The Neville Brothers and Bob Dylan, and for producing Daniel Lanois' solo albums.

== Musical career ==
Johnson worked as a session musician for many notable artists including Isaac Bolden and Jean Knight. At the beginning of his career, he was often featured on funk albums, later moving to more rock, blues and folk music.

Producer Daniel Lanois (U2, Bob Dylan, Brian Eno, Peter Gabriel, Neil Young) has played an important role in his musical career. Lanois helped him get notoriety, mainly due to some of his own collaborations, such as with Brian Eno, Emmylou Harris and Bob Dylan.

Since 2010, he has been a member of the supergroup Black Dub, whose other band members are Daniel Lanois (vocals and guitar), drummer Brian Blade (Joni Mitchell, Wayne Shorter, Joshua Redman), with whom Johnson worked with in the past, and singer Trixie Whitley. The group's self-titled first studio album was released in 2010, filled with music that grows from the rich soil of gospel, blues and pop. Johnson was also a member of Spyboy, Emmylou Harris´s backing band that she formed for a tour to perform songs from her 1995 career-redefining album, Wrecking Ball. Besides Daryl Johnson on bass, the power trio was composed of country singer-songwriter Buddy Miller on guitar and Brady Blade on drums.

Johnson also worked with Trixie Whitley on her solo project The Engine, on which he played several instruments, and which he also co-produced. He had previously worked with Trixie Whitley's father, Chris Whitley, on his 1991 release, Living With The Law.

Besides his many credits as a performer, Johnson has also collected a variety of writing and arrangement credits. He has worked as a songwriter on seven albums of The Neville Brothers, as well as on albums of Emmylou Harris, Black Dub, Daniel Lanois, Ian Moore, and others.

== Discography ==
- Richie Havens, The End Of The Beginning (1976)
- Lee Dorsey, Night People (1978)
- Family Players Band, I Love Funk 'N' Roll (1982)
- The Neville Brothers, Neville-ization (1984)
- The Neville Brothers, Nevillization II: Live At Tipitina's (1987)
- The Neville Brothers, Uptown (1987)
- Bobby King & Terry Evans, Live And Let Live! (1988)
- Bobby King & Terry Evans, Saturday Night (1988)
- Bob Dylan, Oh Mercy (1989)
- Ross Wilson, Dark Side Of The Man (1989)
- Daniel Lanois, Still Water (1989)
- Youssou N'Dour, Set (1990)
- The Neville Brothers, Brother's Keeper (1990)
- Eno/Cale, Wrong Way Up (1990)
- Chris Whitley, Living With The Law (1991)
- Aaron Neville, Warm Your Heart (1991)
- Vernard Johnson, I'm Alive (1991)
- Zachary Richard, Snake Bite Love (1992)
- The Neville Brothers, Family Groove (1992)
- Peter Gabriel, Us (1992)
- Daniel Lanois, Rocky World (1993)
- John Mooney, Testimony (1993)
- Daniel Lanois, For The Beauty Of Wynona (1993)
- Terrance Simien, There's Room For Us All (1993)
- Lisa Germano, Inconsiderate Bitch (1994)
- Emmylou Harris, Wrecking Ball (1995)
- Ian Moore, Modernday Folklore (1996)
- Joe Henry, Trampoline (1996)
- Luscious Jackson, Fever In Fever Out (1996)
- Midnight Oil, Breathe (1996)
- Brian Eno, Sonora Portraits (1999)
- Marianne Faithfull, Vagabond Ways (2000)
- Emmylou Harris, Red Dirt Girl (2000)
- Daniel Lanois, Shine (2003)
- Vic Chesnutt, Silver Lake (2003)
- Emmylou Harris, Stumble Into Grace (2003)
- Sarah McLachlan, Afterglow (2003)
- Peter Gabriel, Hit (2003)
- Daniel Lanois, Rockets (2004)
- Amy Correia, Lakeville (2004)
- Rasmus Helner, Fire In A Stone (2006)
- Sarah McLachlan, Wintersong (2006)
- Bob Dylan, Tell Tale Signs (2008)
- Brian Blade, Mama Rosa (2009)
- Black Dub, Black Dub (2010)
- Trixie Whitley, The Engine (2010)
- Big Crux, Nature Cruising (2011)
- Robbie Robertson, How To Become Clairvoyant (2011)
- Emmylou Harris, Live In Germany 2000 (2011)

== Filmography ==
- Tonight Show - 1993
- "Here Is What Is" - 2007 documentary (premiered at the 2007 Toronto International Film Festival)
