= Christmas Prayer =

Studio album by Aaron Neville
- Released: October 4, 2005
- Recorded: May 2003–May 2005
- Studio: New Orleans & Nashville
- Genre: Christmas
- Length: 53:22
- Label: Tell It
- Producer: Aaron Neville; Art Neville; Barry Beckett; Milton Davis; John Chelew; Gary Lux; Mark Mazzetti

Aaron Neville chronology
Gospel Roots (2005)	Christmas Prayer (2005)	Mojo Soul (2006)

Christmas Prayer is Aaron Neville's fourteenth studio album and his second Christmas album. It was released October 4, 2005. The album peaked at No. 3 on Billboard's Gospel chart, No. 14 on their Christian chart and at No. 74 on the R&B chart.

== Critical reception ==
Professional ratings
Review scores
Source	Rating
AllMusic	3.5/5 stars

Thom Jurek of AllMusic writes, "Neville brings home the Christmas season and its good news origins with a quiet passion, a deep sense of reflection, and elegance."

== Track listing ==
No.	Title	Writer(s)	Length
1.	"Christmas Prayer"	Greg Barnhill	3:47
2.	"Go Tell It on the Mountain"	John Wesley Work Jr.	4:19
3.	"Mary's Boy Child"	Jester Hairston	3:53
4.	"White Christmas"	Irving Berlin	2:33
5.	"Joy to the World"	Isaac Watts; George Frideric Handel	2:23
6.	"Merry Christmas Baby"	Charles Brown	2:48
7.	"Hark! The Herald Angels Sing"	Felix Mendelssohn; Charles Wesley	2:49
8.	"The First Noel"	Traditional	6:00
9.	"Christmas Everyday"	Aaron Neville; Milton Davis	4:14
10.	"O Come All Ye Faithful"	John Francis Wade	4:28
11.	"Ave Maria"	Franz Schubert	4:50
12.	"It Came Upon a Midnight Clear"	Edmund Hamilton Sears; John Baptiste Calkin	3:38
13.	"Amen"	Curtis Mayfield	3:07
14.	"Amazing Grace" (unlisted track)	John Newton	4:33
Total length:			53:22

Track information and credits adapted from the album's liner notes.

== Charts ==
Chart (2010)	Peak position
US Top Gospel Albums (Billboard)	3
US Christian Albums (Billboard)	14
US Top R&B/Hip-Hop Albums (Billboard)	74
