= Below Sea Level =

Studio album by Eric Johanson
- Released: September 18, 2020
- Recorded: February 2020
- Studio: Zebra Ranch Studios
- Genre: Blues, Southern rock
- Length: 43:46
- Label: Nola Blue Records
- Producer: Luther Dickinson, Eric Johanson

Eric Johanson chronology
Blues in My Blood (2019)	Below Sea Level (2020)	Covered Tracks, Vol. 1 (2021)

Professional ratings
Review scores
Source	Rating
All About Jazz	4/5 stars

Below Sea Level is Eric Johanson's second solo studio album, released on September 18, 2020, on Nola Blue Records. The album was recorded at Luther Dickinson's Zebra Ranch Studios in late February, 2020.

In 2019 at the New Orleans Jazz and Heritage Festival, Johanson joined Luther Dickinson at an all-star jam concert. At that meeting Johanson and Dickinson decided to join to make Johanson's next album, with Dickinson producing and Cody Dickinson of the North Mississippi Allstars on drums.

== Track listing ==
All tracks are written by Eric Johanson

No.	Title	Length
1.	"Buried Above Ground"	3:24
2.	"Down to the Bottom"	3:45
3.	"Changes the Universe"	4:06
4.	"Never Tomorrow"	2:51
5.	"Hammer on the Stone"	4:07
6.	"Have Mercy"	3:46
7.	"River of Oblivion"	4:36
8.	"Nowhere to Go"	2:36
9.	"Open Hearted Woman"	4:29
10.	"Dose of Forget"	2:56
11.	"Love Is Rebellion"	3:46
12.	"Riverbend Blues"	3:24
Total length:		43:46

== Personnel ==
Musicians

- Eric Johanson – vocals, guitar
- Terrence Grayson – bass
- Cody Dickinson – drums
- Ray Jacildo – B3 organ on "Changes the Universe"

Production

- Luther Dickinson - producer
- Eric Johanson - co-producer
- Kevin Houston - engineering
- M. Allen Parker - mixing
- Chris Chetlan - mastering
