= Jesse Dayton =

American singer-songwriter

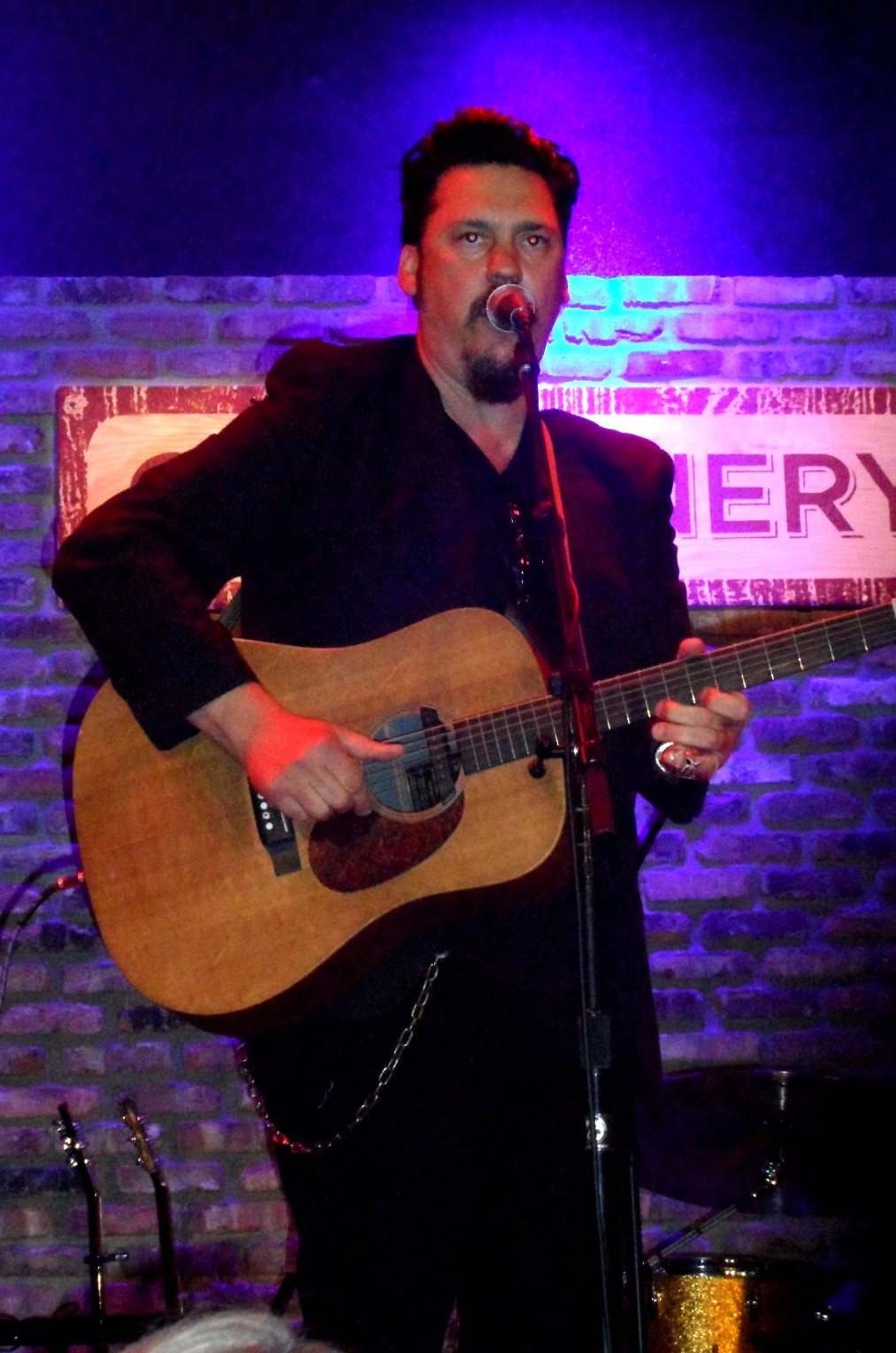
- Dayton in 2014

Background information
- Born: Beaumont, Texas
- Genres: Alternative country; rockabilly
- Occupations: Musician, record producer
- Instruments: Guitar, singer
- Website: www.jessedayton.com

Jesse Dayton is an American musician and record producer from Austin, Texas best known for his guitar contributions to albums by country musicians including Johnny Cash, Waylon Jennings, and Willie Nelson. He is also notable for his collaborations with horror film director Rob Zombie, who has commissioned Dayton on multiple occasions to record music to accompany his films.

== Career ==
Dayton was born in Beaumont, Texas, where he was raised on the music of George Jones, Hank Williams, and Lefty Frizzell, all the while harboring an affinity for the spirit of punk with bands like the Clash. After touring with two rockabilly bands, the Road Kings and the Alamo Jets, Dayton ventured off into solo territory, recording his Americana-chart-topping record Raisin' Cain.

With Lucinda Williams Dayton performed at Bill Clinton's second inaugural ball.

Since then Dayton has released several different solo albums and worked with a variety of country rock artists, most notably Waylon Jennings and Johnny Cash on Right for the Time (1996) after Jennings injured his picking thumb and required a guitar stand-in. Dayton also contributed guitarwork on albums by the Supersuckers and Kris Kristofferson.

In 2004, horror film director Rob Zombie commissioned Jesse Dayton to record an album for the fictional characters Banjo and Sullivan from his sophomore feature The Devil's Rejects. The resulting album was a collection of tongue-in-cheek honky-tonk country entitled Banjo & Sullivan: The Ultimate Collection. In Zombie's Halloween II, Dayton performs as the lead singer and guitarist of the fictional psychobilly band Captain Clegg and the Night Creatures. He released an album entitled Rob Zombie Presents...Captain Clegg and the Night Creatures on August 28, same day as the film Halloween II premiered. Following this, Jesse Dayton wrote and directed the 2013 horror film Zombex, starring Malcolm McDowell, Lew Temple and Sid Haig.

In 2014 he toured with John Doe both as the opening act and a member of Doe's backing band. In 2015 Dayton played guitar in the band X on their US tour, filling in for Billy Zoom who had been diagnosed with cancer. In 2016 he again toured with John Doe as well being the opener on the Supersuckers European and US tours.

On September 16, 2016, he released his ninth album titled The Revealer on his Hardcharger Records imprint through Blue Élan Records. This was followed by The Outsider in 2018. 2019 saw the release of a live album, On Fire in Nashville, and Mixtape Volume 1, a collection of covers. In 2020, Dayton released the Gulf Coast Sessions EP, as well as Texas '45 RPM Showdown, a limited 7 inch vinyl made in conjunction with Record Store Day.

On October 30 & 31, 2021, Jesse played guitar at the Danzig Sings Elvis shows (along with Glenn Danzig-vocals, Steve Zing-drums, and Ronnie King- piano) at the Hollywood Roosevelt hotel in Los Angeles, California.

== Awards and honors ==
In 2023, Dayton and musician Samantha Fish received OffBeat's Best of the Beat Awards in the categories of Best Music Video (for "Deathwish") and Best Blues Album (for Death Wish Blues).

== Discography ==
=== Albums ===
- Raisin' Cain (Justice, 1995)
- Hey Nashvegas! (Stag, 2001)
- Tall Texas Tales (Stag, 2003)
- Country Soul Brother (Stag, 2004)
- Banjo & Sullivan: The Ultimate Collection with Lew Temple (Hip-O/UMe, 2005; as 'Banjo & Sullivan')
- South Austin Sessions (Stag, 2005)
- Holdin' Our Own with Brennen Leigh (Stag, 2007)
- Captain Clegg and the Nightcreatures (Zombie A Go-Go/Stag, 2009; as 'Captain Clegg and the Nightcreatures')
- One for the Dance Halls (Stag, 2010)
- Jesse Sings Kinky (Stag, 2012; tribute to Kinky Friedman)
- Tall Walkin' Texas Trash (Dayton Productions, 2015; limited edition/sold only at shows)
- The Revealer (Hardcharger/Blue Élan, 2016)
- The Outsider (Hardcharger/Blue Élan, 2018)
- On Fire in Nashville (Hardcharger/Blue Élan, 2019)
- Mixtape Vol. 1 (Hardcharger/Blue Élan, 2019)
- Sings Doug Sahm & Townes Van Zandt (Texas 45 RPM Showdown!) [7" single] (Hardcharger/Blue Élan, 2020)
- Gulf Coast Sessions (Hardcharger/Blue Élan, 2020)
- Beaumonster (Hardcharger, 2021)
- Death Wish Blues with Samantha Fish (Rounder, 2023)
- The Hard Way Blues (Hardcharger, 2024)

=== With The Road Kings ===
- The Roadkings (Bullet, 1993)
- Rockabilly (Bullet/My Way [Finland], 1994)
- Live At The Satellite Lounge! (Alter Ego, 1996 [1997])
- Road Kings (Surfdog/Hollywood, 1999)
- 17 Classics [compilation] (self release)
