= The Wild Tchoupitoulas =

Group of Mardi Gras Indians

- Origin: New Orleans, Louisiana
- Genres: Mardi Gras Indian music, funk
- Years active: 1976

The Wild Tchoupitoulas were originally a group of Mardi Gras Indians formed in the early 1970s by George "Big Chief Jolly" Landry. Landry, with his self-identified Choctaw heritage, had been an active performer in the Mardi Gras Indian styling for a number of years. The group is named after the Tchoupitoulas tribe who also gave their name to Tchoupitoulas Street.

With help from local New Orleans musicians the Meters, the Wild Tchoupitoulas recorded an eponymous album, which featured the "call-and-response" style chants typical of Mardi Gras Indians. Vocals were provided by Landry, as well as other members of his Mardi Gras tribe. Instrumentation was provided in part by members of the Meters. The album also notably featured Landry's nephews, the Neville Brothers, providing harmonies and some of the instrumentation. The album was produced by famed New Orleans writer-musician-producer Allen Toussaint.

While not a financial success, the album and The Wild Tchoupitoulas' style was well received critically and the experience working with them encouraged the four Neville brothers to continue performing together as a group.

== Discography ==
- The Wild Tchoupitoulas (1976)
