= Louisiana Music Factory =

Record store in New Orleans, Louisiana

Coordinates: 29.95304°N 90.06605°W

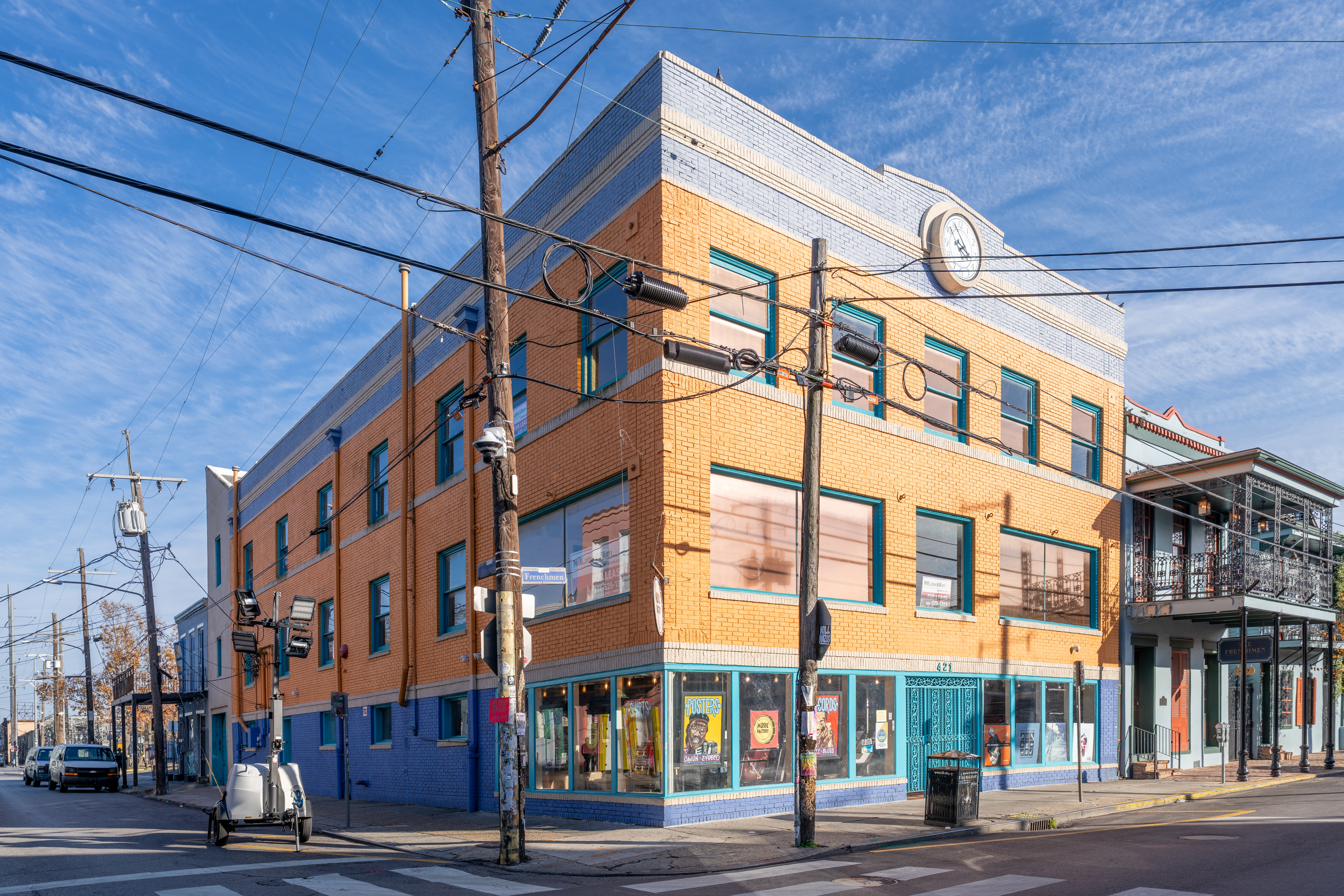
Current Store on Frenchman Street (2026)

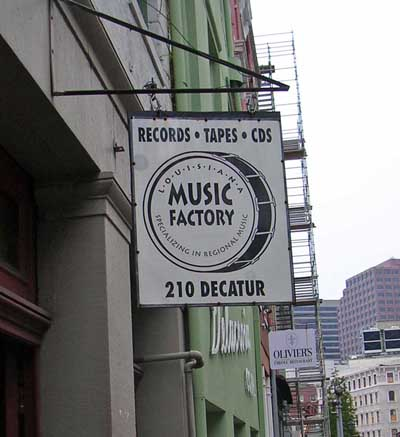
Louisiana Music Factory's former location on Decatur Street

Louisiana Music Factory is an independent record and CD store located on Frenchmen Street in the Faubourg Marigny neighborhood of New Orleans, Louisiana. Its specialty is local music, and is well known among music aficionados around the world. Its rich inventory of New Orleans and Louisiana music include CDs and vinyl of traditional jazz, blues, rhythm and blues, zydeco and Cajun music, many of which are on local independent labels and hard to find outside the Louisiana region.

The store also holds weekly in-store performances throughout the year. Many performances showcase local artists, especially during the New Orleans Jazz & Heritage Festival period.

== History ==
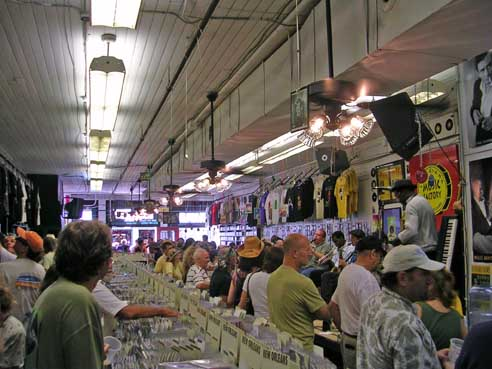
Inside the store's former location on Decatur Street

The store was opened in February 1992 by founders Jerry Brock and Barry Smith on North Peters Street in the French Quarter. Brock had been known as one of the founders of the local community radio station WWOZ, and a producer who first recorded the Dirty Dozen Brass Band.

In 1996, the store moved to a location on Decatur Street within the French Quarter. The Decatur Street store was two-storied, devoting the second floor to vintage vinyl. In 2001, Brock left the store to pursue other opportunities, and Smith became the sole owner.

The store suffered little damage by Hurricane Katrina in 2005 and was one of the first record stores to reopen after the storm.

In March 2014, the store moved to its current location at 421 Frenchmen Street, downriver from the Decatur Street location.
