= Charles Neville (musician) =

American R&B and jazz saxophonist (1938–2018)

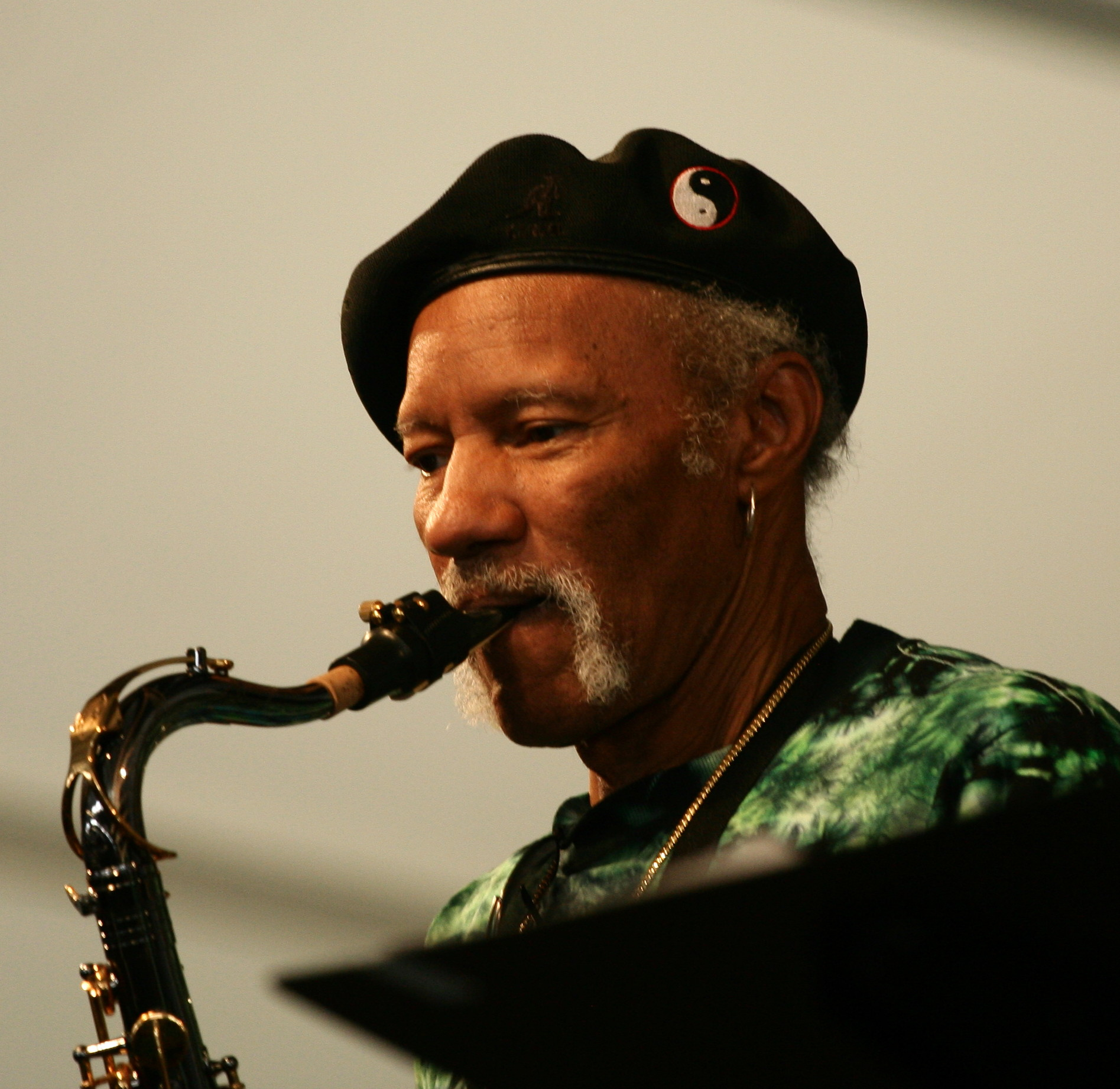
- Neville playing sax at Jazz Fest, 2011

Background information
- Born: December 28, 1938; New Orleans, Louisiana, U.S.
- Died: April 26, 2018 (aged 79) Huntington, Massachusetts, U.S.
- Genres: R&B, Jazz, Funk, Pop
- Occupation: musician
- Instrument: saxophone
- Years active: 1954–2018
- Website: www.charlesnevillesite.com

Charles Neville (December 28, 1938 – April 26, 2018) was an American R&B and jazz musician best known as part of The Neville Brothers. Known onstage as "Charlie the horn man", his saxophone playing helped earn the group a Grammy Award for best pop instrumental performance.

== Early life ==
The second oldest of the four Neville brothers, Charles Neville was born in New Orleans on December 28, 1938, to Arthur Lanon Neville Sr. and Amelia (Landry) Neville and was raised in the Calliope housing project with his musical brothers, Art, Aaron, and Cyril. Their uncle, George "Big Chief Jolly" Landry, was lead singer of the Mardi Gras Indian group The Wild Tchoupitoulas. Charles left home when he was 15 to play saxophone with the Rabbit's Foot Minstrel Show. When back in New Orleans, he played in the house band at the Dew Drop Inn.

He served in the Navy from 1956 to 1958 and discovered the music scene on Beale Street while stationed in Memphis, Tennessee, later touring with B.B. King and Bobby (Blue) Bland.

== Career ==
He joined the band of fellow New Orleanian Larry Williams, but his addiction to heroin landed him short jail terms for the shoplifting that sometimes supported his habit. He finally overcame his addictions in 1986. Beginning in 1963 he served three and a half years at Louisiana State Penitentiary at Angola for possession of marijuana. He practiced in the prison music room with other incarcerated New Orleans musicians, notably pianist James Booker and drummer James Black. Moving to New York City after release from prison, he explored modern jazz and toured with Johnnie Taylor, Clarence Carter, and O. V. Wright.

In 1976 he returned to New Orleans when his maternal uncle, George "Big Chief Jolly" Landry, called Charles and his brothers Art, Aaron, and Cyril together to record with his Mardi Gras Indian group, The Wild Tchoupitoulas. The blend of traditional and funk music on The Wild Tchoupitoulas album (1976) has made it an icon of New Orleans musical culture.

Shortly afterward, the four brothers formed The Neville Brothers, recording more than a dozen albums and building a worldwide following. For years they were the closing act on the main stage of the New Orleans Jazz and Heritage Festival.

Charles's saxophone playing was especially notable on the title track of their best-selling album, Yellow Moon (1989), and helped earn the group its only Grammy, for best pop instrumental performance, for the album's, "Healing Chant".

He moved to rural Massachusetts in the 1990s with his wife, Kristin Neville, and children and continued to perform and record with family members and a wide variety of musicians for the rest of his life. His recordings include an album with the groups Diversity, with jazz and classical musicians, and Songcatchers, with Native American musicians.

Neville is interviewed on screen and appears in performance footage with the Neville Brothers in the 2005 documentary film Make It Funky!, which presents a history of New Orleans music and its influence on rhythm and blues, rock and roll, funk and jazz. In the film, the band performs "Fire on the Bayou" with guests Ivan and Ian Neville.

In 2008 he released his own album, reflecting his interests in Eastern spirituality, Safe in Buddha’s Palm. He returned often to New Orleans, playing with his jazz combos at Snug Harbor and with his daughter, jazz and funk singer Charmaine Neville. He also performed with two of his sons, Talyn and Khalif, as the New England Nevilles. After 2012 he toured with Aaron Neville's solo band and appeared with him for Aaron's first performance at the French Quarter Festival in 2017. Charles's last Jazz Fest performance was with Dr. John in 2017.

He was scheduled to join in "The Neville Family Groove", a musical celebration of the Nevilles at Tipitina's in November 2017, but was by then hospitalized with pancreatic cancer, from which he died on April 26, 2018, at the age of 79 years old.

== Discography ==
- 1990 Charles Neville & Diversity (Delta) Diversity
- 1994 Dreaming in Color (A&M) Songcatchers
- 2008 Safe in Buddha’s Palm (CD Baby) Charles Neville
