= The Neville Brothers =

American rhythm and blues, soul, and funk band

- Origin: New Orleans, Louisiana, U.S.
- Genres: R&B, soul, funk
- Years active: 1976–2012, 2015
- Labels: Capitol, Black Top, A&M, EMI, Columbia, Back Porch
- Past members: Aaron Neville; Art Neville; Charles Neville; Cyril Neville; Ivan Neville

The Neville Brothers were an American R&B/soul/funk group formed in 1976 in New Orleans, Louisiana.

== History ==
The group notion started in 1976 when the four brothers of the Neville family, Art (1937–2019), Charles (1938–2018), Aaron (b. 1941), and Cyril (b. 1948) came together to take part in the recording session of the Wild Tchoupitoulas, a Mardi Gras Indian group led by the Nevilles' uncle, George Landry ("Big Chief Jolly").

Their debut album, The Neville Brothers, was released in 1978 on Capitol Records.

In 1987, the group released Uptown on the EMI label, featuring guests including Branford Marsalis, Keith Richards, and Carlos Santana. The following year saw the release of Yellow Moon from A&M Records produced by Daniel Lanois. The track "Healing Chant" from the album won the Grammy Award for Best Pop Instrumental Performance at the 1990 Grammy ceremony.

In 1990, the Neville Brothers contributed "In the Still of the Night" to the AIDS benefit album Red Hot + Blue produced by the Red Hot Organization.

Also in 1990, they appeared on the bill at that year's Glastonbury Festival. Due to Art Neville devoting more time to his other act, The Meters, the band kept a low profile in the late 1990s onto the early 2000s. They made a comeback in 2004, however, with the album, Walkin' in the Shadow of Life, on Back Porch Records, their first newly recorded effort in five years.

All brothers except Charles, a Massachusetts resident, had been living in New Orleans, but following Hurricane Katrina in 2005 Cyril and Aaron moved out of the city. Aaron moved to Austin briefly at the invitation on his friend, the late blues club impresario, Clifford Antone. They had not been performing in New Orleans since Katrina hit the city; however, they finally returned to perform there at the New Orleans Jazz & Heritage Festival in 2008, being given the closing spot which had been reserved for them for years.

Infrequently, Aaron's son Ivan Neville (keyboards) and Art's son Ian Neville (electric guitar), both of the band Dumpstaphunk, have played with the Neville Brothers.

The Neville Brothers appear in performance footage in the 2005 documentary film Make It Funky!, which presents a history of New Orleans music and its influence on rhythm and blues, rock and roll, funk and jazz. In the film, they perform "Fire on the Bayou" with guests Ivan and Ian Neville.

The group formally disbanded in 2012 but reunited in 2015 for a farewell concert in New Orleans. Charles Neville died of pancreatic cancer on April 26, 2018, at the age of 79. Art Neville died on July 22, 2019, at the age of 81. A cause of death was not provided.

In June 2026, CBS News included the Neville Brothers' song Brother John / Iko Iko in its list of the 250 essential American songs of the past 250 years.

== Discography ==
=== Studio albums ===
| Year | Title | Label | Peak chart positions | | |
| Year | Title | Label | US | NZ | UK |
|---|---|---|---|---|---|
| 1978 | The Neville Brothers | Capitol | — | — | — |
| 1981 | Fiyo on the Bayou | A&M | 166 | — | — |
| 1987 | Uptown | EMI America | 155 | — | — |
| 1989 | Yellow Moon | A&M | 66 | 16 | — |
| 1990 | Brother's Keeper | A&M | 60 | 4 | 35 |
| 1992 | Family Groove | A&M | 103 | 11 | — |
| 1996 | Mitakuye Oyasin Oyasin/All My Relations | A&M | — | — | — |
| 1999 | Valence Street | Columbia | — | — | — |
| 2004 | Walkin' in the Shadow of Life | Back Porch/EMI | — | — | — |
"—" denotes releases that did not chart or were not released in that territory.

=== Live albums ===
- 1984: Neville-ization (Black Top)
- 1987: Nevillization 2 (Live at Tipitina's Volume 2) (Spindletop)
- 1994: Live on Planet Earth (A&M)
- 1998: Live at Tipitina's (1982) (Rhino)
- 2010: Authorized Bootleg: Warfield Theatre, San Francisco, CA, February 27, 1989 (A&M)

=== Compilation albums ===
- 1986: Treacherous: A History of the Neville Brothers (1955–1985) (Rhino)
- 1991: Treacherous Too!: A History of the Neville Brothers, Vol. 2 (1955-1987) (Rhino)
- 1997: The Very Best of the Neville Brothers (Rhino)
- 1998: Greatest Hits (A&M)
- 1999: Uptown Rulin' – The Best of the Neville Brothers (A&M)
- 2004: 20th Century Masters – The Millenium Collection: The Best of the Neville Brothers (A&M)
- 2005: Gold (Hip-O/UMe)

=== Singles ===
| Year | Single | Peak positions | | | | | | | Album |
| Year | Single | US R&B | AUS | NZ | NLD | GER | IRE | UK | Album |
|---|---|---|---|---|---|---|---|---|---|
| 1978 | "Washable Ink / Speed of Light" | — | — | — | — | — | — | — | The Neville Brothers |
| 1979 | "Sweet Honey Dripper / Dance Your Blues Away" | — | — | — | — | — | — | — | Non-album single |
| 1981 | "Sitting In Limbo / Brother John / Iko Iko" | — | — | — | — | — | — | — | Fiyo on the Bayou |
| 1987 | "Whatever It Takes" | — | — | — | — | — | — | — | Uptown |
| 1989 | "Sister Rosa" | 75 | 154 | 23 | — | — | — | — | Yellow Moon |
| 1989 | "Yellow Moon" | — | 89 | — | 21 | — | — | — | Yellow Moon |
| 1989 | "With God on Our Side" | — | — | — | 53 | — | 26 | 47 | Yellow Moon |
| 1990 | "A Change Is Gonna Come" | — | — | — | — | — | — | — | Yellow Moon |
| 1990 | "Bird on a Wire" | — | 160 | 5 | — | 35 | — | 72 | Brother's Keeper |
| 1990 | "River of Life" | — | 159 | — | — | — | — | — | Brother's Keeper |
| 1990 | "Fearless" | — | — | 40 | — | — | — | — | Brother's Keeper |
| 1991 | "Sons and Daughters" | — | — | — | — | — | — | — | Brother's Keeper |
| 1991 | "Drift Away" | — | — | 19 | — | — | — | — | Treacherous Too! A History of the Neville Brothers |
| 1992 | "Fly Like an Eagle" | — | 44 | 8 | 66 | — | — | — | Family Groove |
| 1992 | "One More Day" | — | — | 29 | — | — | — | — | Family Groove |
| 1992 | "On the Other Side of Paradise" | — | — | — | — | — | — | — | Family Groove |
| 1993 | "Take Me to Heart" | — | 200 | — | — | — | — | — | Family Groove |
"—" denotes releases that did not chart or were not released.

=== Related albums ===
- 1976: The Wild Tchoupitoulas (with four of The Neville Brothers)
- 1997: Wyclef Jean Presents The Carnival by Wyclef Jean (guest appearance on "Mona Lisa")
