= Aaron Neville =

American singer (born 1941)

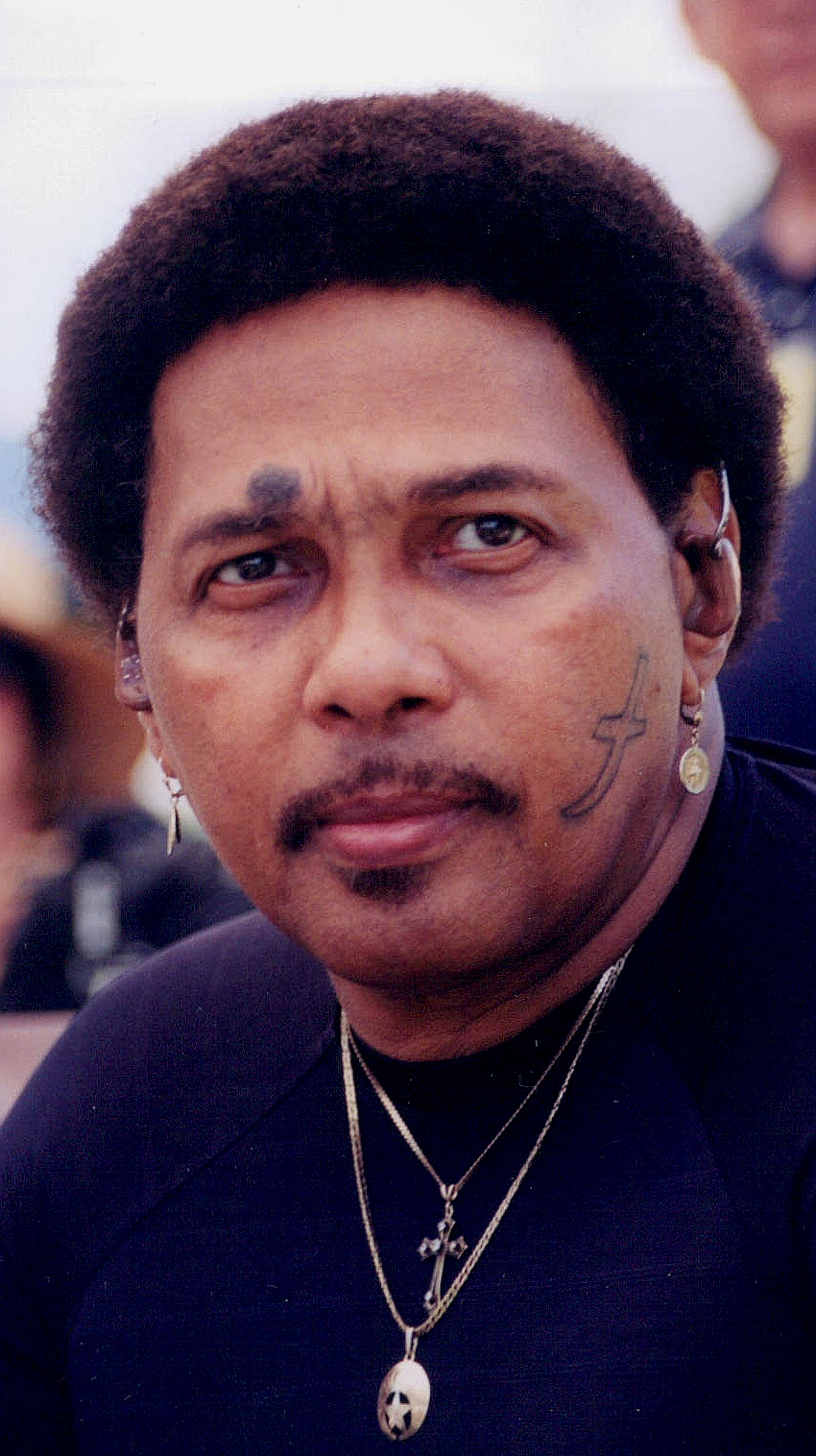
- Neville in 1999

Background information
- Born: Aaron Joseph Neville; January 24, 1941 (age 85)
- Origin: New Orleans, Louisiana, U.S.
- Genres: R&B; soul; country; gospel; jazz; pop
- Occupation: Singer
- Years active: 1960–present
- Labels: Minit; Par-Lo; Curb; A&M; Chordant; EMI; Burgundy
- Website: aaronneville.com

Aaron Joseph Neville (born January 24, 1941) is an American singer renowned for his distinctively smooth, vibrato-heavy tenor and a genre-crossing career that spans R&B, soul, gospel, jazz, country, and pop. He gained national prominence with his 1966 single "Tell It Like It Is", which peaked at number two on the Billboard Hot 100 and was later inducted into the Grammy Hall of Fame.

As a solo artist, Neville achieved three consecutive RIAA platinum-selling albums in the 1990s and topped the Billboard Jazz chart with Nature Boy: The Standards Album. He has earned four Grammy Awards, four Top 10 Gospel albums, and a Grammy nomination for Best Male Country Vocal Performance for his 1993 cover of "The Grand Tour". His duets with Linda Ronstadt, including "Don't Know Much" and "All My Life", both topped the Adult Contemporary chart and won Grammy Awards. He has also performed the United States national anthem at the Super Bowl on two occasions, including a 2006 rendition alongside Aretha Franklin and Dr. John.

In addition to his solo work, he is a founding member of the Neville Brothers, alongside his brothers Art, Charles, and Cyril. Neville contributed to notable compilations such as Rhythm, Country and Blues (with Trisha Yearwood) and The Bodyguard soundtrack. In 2023, he won his fourth Grammy Award for Best American Roots Performance for "Stompin' Ground", a collaboration with the Dirty Dozen Brass Band. That same year, he was named one of Rolling Stone's 200 Greatest Singers of All Time.

== Career ==
The first of Neville's singles that was given airplay outside of New Orleans was "Over You", released in 1960. His first hit single was "Tell It Like It Is", released by local musician/arranger George Davis, a friend from school, and band-leader Lee Diamond. The song topped Billboard's R&B chart for five weeks in 1967 and also reached No. 2 on the Billboard Hot 100 (behind "I'm a Believer" by the Monkees). It sold more than one million copies, and was awarded a gold disc.

Neville released his first solo album since the late 1960s in 1986 with the independent release Orchid in The Storm. In 1989, Neville teamed up with Linda Ronstadt on the album Cry Like a Rainstorm, Howl Like the Wind which included four duets by the pair. Amongst them were the No. 1 Grammy-winning hits "Don't Know Much" and "All My Life". "Don't Know Much" reached No. 2 on the Hot 100, and was certified Gold for selling a million copies, while the album was certified Triple Platinum for US sales of more than three million.

Following the success of Cry Like a Rainstorm, Howl Like the Wind, Ronstadt produced his 1991 album Warm Your Heart including the hit single "Everybody Plays the Fool", a cover of the 1972 Main Ingredient song, which reached No. 8 on the Billboard Hot 100 and another duet with Ronstadt "Close Your Eyes". Warm Your Heart was certified platinum in 1997 for more than a million sales in the U.S.

During 1993 and 1994, Neville expanded his repertoire as a recording artist and ventured into making country music. In 1993, Neville released the platinum-selling The Grand Tour on A&M Records with lead single "Don't Take Away My Heaven" reaching No. 4 on the Adult Contemporary chart (where previous hits "Don't Know Much", "All My Life", and "Everybody Plays the Fool" all reached number one). The follow-up single "The Grand Tour", a cover of country music legend George Jones' 1974 hit, peaked at No. 38 on the Billboard country singles chart, and was highly acclaimed by fans and critics, resulting in a nomination for the Grammy Award for Best Male Country Vocal Performance at the 36th Annual Grammy Awards in 1994. He followed the album up with another platinum seller Aaron Neville's Soulful Christmas.

Neville's next country music project involved appearing on 1994's Rhythm, Country and Blues, an album of duets featuring R&B and Country artists performing renditions of classic country and R&B songs. Neville recorded a version of "I Fall to Pieces", a major crossover hit for Patsy Cline originally released in 1961, with Trisha Yearwood that resulted in Neville and Yearwood winning the Grammy Award for Best Country Collaboration with Vocals at the 37th Annual Grammy Awards. As a result, Neville became one of the only African American recording artists to win a Grammy within the Country genre. In April 1994, Neville appeared on Sesame Street to sing the song "I Don't Want to Live on the Moon" as a duet with Ernie.

Neville's 1995 release, The Tattooed Heart, featuring covers of classics by Bill Withers and Kris Kristofferson went gold, while 1997's pop-oriented ...To Make Me Who I Am included songwriting contributions from contemporary hitmakers Babyface and Diane Warren as well as two new duets with Ronstadt, including a cover of "The First Time Ever I Saw Your Face". This was followed by a 2000 gospel album Devotion, which topped the US gospel album chart, and his 2003 debut for Verve Records entitled Nature Boy: The Standards Album, which topped the US jazz album chart. The album saw Neville covering selections from the Great American Songbook, including another Ronstadt duet "The Very Thought of You".

In August 2005, Neville's home in Eastern New Orleans was destroyed by Hurricane Katrina; he evacuated to Memphis, before the hurricane hit. He went to Austin to visit his friend Clifford Antone, then moved to Nashville. He performed Randy Newman's "Louisiana 1927" on NBC's A Concert for Hurricane Relief on September 2, 2005, and "A Change is Gonna Come" at the New York benefit concert From the Big Apple to the Big Easy. When he didn't return to the city by early 2008, the New Orleans Jazz and Heritage Festival temporarily changed its tradition of having the Neville Brothers close the festival. However, the band, including Aaron, returned for the 2008 Jazzfest, which returned to its traditional seven-day format for the first time since Katrina. He then moved back to New Orleans area, to the nearby city of Covington.

Neville signed to Sony BMG's new Burgundy Records label in late 2005 and recorded an album of songs by Otis Redding, Marvin Gaye, Curtis Mayfield, Sam Cooke and others for Bring It On Home...The Soul Classics, released on September 19, 2006. The album, produced by Stewart Levine, features collaborations between Neville and Chaka Khan, Mavis Staples, Chris Botti, David Sanborn, Art Neville, and others. The album's first single was a remake of The Impressions' 1963 classic "It's All Right".

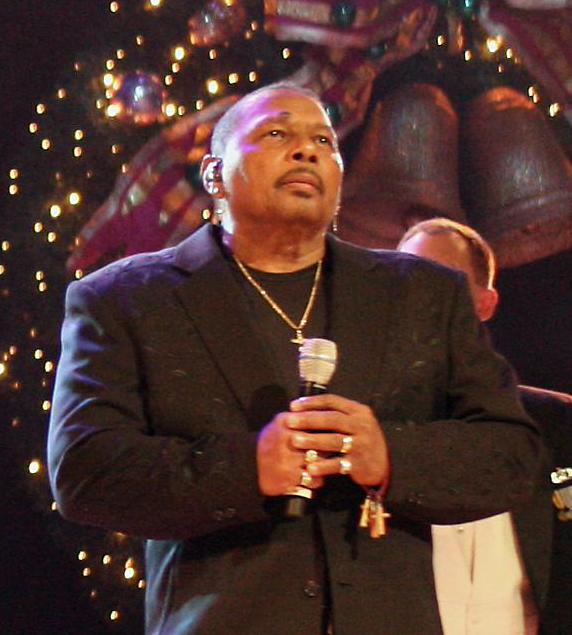
Neville in 2007

Neville's career has included work for television, movies and sporting events. He sang the United States national anthem in the 1996 movie The Fan, starring Robert De Niro and Wesley Snipes. Neville also sang the anthem at the WWF's SummerSlam 1993 and at WCW's Spring Stampede 1994. Neville has twice performed the anthem at the Super Bowl. His first appearance was at Super Bowl XXIV in 1990 in New Orleans. He returned to the event at Super Bowl XL in 2006, performing alongside Aretha Franklin and Dr. John on keyboards, in a performance that was widely praised and served as a tribute to New Orleans in the wake of Hurricane Katrina.

Neville sang the theme music to the children's TV series Fisher-Price Little People and the songs for the sixth volume, "Discovering Seasons." He also sang a new version of "Cotton", for Cotton Incorporated which was introduced during the 1992 Summer Olympics. In 1988 he recorded "Mickey Mouse March" for Stay Awake: Various Interpretations of Music from Vintage Disney Films, one of Various Artists. Neville (along with brothers Art and Cyril) did background vocals for the songs "Great Heart", "Bring Back the Magic", "Homemade Music", "My Barracuda", and "Smart Woman (in a Real Short Skirt)" on Jimmy Buffett's Hot Water, released in 1988.

Neville was interviewed on screen and appeared in performance footage with his brothers in the 2005 documentary film Make It Funky!, which presents a history of New Orleans music and its influence on rhythm and blues, rock and roll, funk and jazz. The Nevilles perform "Fire on the Bayou" in the film. On October 27, 2006, Neville made a guest appearance on an episode of the soap opera The Young and the Restless. He sang "Stand by Me" and "Ain't No Sunshine", from his album, Bring It On Home ... The Soul Classics.

In 2008, he released Gold, which includes a double album of his hits. He also released an album of traditional carols called Christmas & Hits Duos. The song "Christmas Prayer" was featured on the ER episode The High Holiday.

In 2009, Neville, along with the Mt. Zion Mass Choir, released a version of the song "A Change Is Gonna Come" on the compilation album Oh Happy Day. In 2010, Neville and his brother Art performed with The Meters.

Neville was the featured artist for the 100th Anniversary Celebration of the University of Memphis Centennial Concert September 30, 2011, at the Cannon Center for the Performing Arts. That year, Neville toured New Zealand with The Blind Boys of Alabama and Mavis Staples.

In January 2013, paying tribute to the songs of his youth, Blue Note Records released Neville's My True Story, a collection of 12 doo-wop tunes, produced by Don Was and Keith Richards, with backing by musicians such as Benmont Tench from Tom Petty and the Heartbreakers. In March 2015, he was named the year's recipient of the Laetare Medal. In October 2015, Keith Richards selected the song "My True Story" as one of his Desert Island Discs.

In May 2021, the 80-year old Neville announced his retirement from touring, but said he may still record albums or perform occasionally for special events or festivals.

In 2023, Rolling Stone ranked Neville at number 104 on its list of the 200 Greatest Singers of All Time.

In June 2026, CBS News included Neville's single Angola Bound in its list of the 250 essential American songs of the past 250 years.

== Personal life ==
Neville is from New Orleans, Louisiana. He has mixed African-American, white, and Choctaw heritage. His uncle, George "Big Chief Jolly" Landry, was lead singer of the Mardi Gras Indian group the Wild Tchoupitoulas.

Neville got his facial tattoo (of a sword) when he was 16 years old. Speaking to Billboard in 2019, he recalled that "My dad made me scrub it with Brillo Pads and Octagon Soap. The skin came off, but the tattoo stayed. But some years later, I had an album out called The Tattooed Heart [in 1995], and we were doing a special thing in a tattoo parlor, so I let them go over it and outline it – freshen it up."

Neville married Joel (pronounced Jo-EL) Roux Neville on January 10, 1959. Together they had four children: Ernestine, Aaron "Fred" Jr., and musicians Ivan and Jason. Neville is also the uncle of journalist Arthel Neville.

In 2008, during a People magazine photo shoot, Neville met photographer Sarah Ann Friedman. They were married in New York on November 13, 2010.

Neville is Catholic, with a devotion to St. Jude, to whom he has credited his success and survival. He wears a St. Jude Medal as a left earring.

== Discography ==
=== Studio albums ===
Year	Album	Peak chart positions							Certifications	Label
Year	Album	US R&B	US Christ	US Gospel	US Jazz	US	AUS	UK Jazz	Certifications	Label
1966	Tell It Like It Is	—	—	—	—	—	—	—		Par Lo Records
1967	Like It 'Tis	—	—	—	—	—	—	—		Minit
1986	Orchid in the Storm	—	—	—	—	—	140	—		Passport; Rhino; Hyena
1991	Warm Your Heart	62	—	—	—	44	51	—	RIAA: Platinum; MC: Gold	A&M
1993	The Grand Tour	—	—	—	—	37	154	—	RIAA: Platinum; MC: Gold	A&M
1993	Aaron Neville's Soulful Christmas	—	—	—	—	36	176	—	RIAA: Platinum; MC: Gold	A&M
1995	The Tattooed Heart	50	—	—	—	64	150	—	RIAA: Gold	A&M
1997	To Make Me Who I Am	73	—	—	—	188	—	—		A&M
2000	Devotion	—	28	7	—	—	—	—		Chordant
2002	Humdinger	—	—	—	—	—	—	—		EMI
2003	Believe	—	14	2	—	191	—	—		Telit
2003	Nature Boy: The Standards Album	85	—	—	1	—	—	—		Verve
2005	Gospel Roots	—	—	25	—	—	—	—		Chordant
2005	Christmas Prayer	74	14	3	—	—	—	—		EMI Gospel
2006	Mojo Soul	—	—	—	—	—	—	—		Music Avenue
2006	Bring It On Home... The Soul Classics	20	—	—	—	37	—	—		Burgundy
2010	I Know I've Been Changed	50	29	10	—	—	—	—		EMI Gospel
2013	My True Story	7	—	—	—	45	—	15		Blue Note
2016	Apache	—	—	—	—	—	—	—		Tell It Records
"—" denotes releases that did not chart or were not released in that territory.

=== Compilation albums ===
- Greatest Hits (1990)
- The Very Best of Aaron Neville (2000)
- 20th Century Masters – The Millennium Collection: The Best of Aaron Neville (2002)
- Brother to Brother (2003)
- Love Songs (2003)
- Aaron Neville & Friends (Sky Blue Music, 2007)
- Gold (2008) 2-CD

=== Singles (Lead Artist) ===
Year	Title	Peak chart positions							Album
Year	Title	US	US AC	US R&B	US Cou.	CAN	CAN AC	AUS	Album
1960	"Over You"	—	—	21	—	—	—	—	Non-album song
1966	"Tell It Like It Is"	2	—	1	—	96	2	—	Tell It Like It Is
1967	"She Took You for a Ride"	92	—	—	—	—	—	—	Tell It Like It Is
1972	"Baby I'm-a Want You"	—	—	—	—	—	—	—	Non-album songs
1973	"Hercules"	—	—	—	—	—	—	—	Non-album songs
1978	"The Greatest Love"	—	—	—	—	—	—	—	Non-album songs
1991	"Everybody Plays the Fool"	8	1	—	—	19	—	52	Warm Your Heart
1991	"Somewhere Somebody"	—	6	—	—	43	15	—	Warm Your Heart
1992	"Close Your Eyes" (with Linda Ronstadt)	—	38	—	—	90	—	—	Warm Your Heart
1993	"Don't Take Away My Heaven"	56	4	—	—	17	12	162	The Grand Tour
1993	"The Grand Tour"	90	—	—	38	—	—	—	The Grand Tour
1993	"Don't Fall Apart on Me Tonight"	—	26	—	—	37	—	—	The Grand Tour
1994	"I Owe You One"	—	—	—	—	51	29	—	The Grand Tour
1994	"I Fall to Pieces" (with Trisha Yearwood)	—	—	—	72	—	—	—	Rhythm, Country and Blues
1994	"Even If My Heart Would Break" (with Kenny G)	—	—	—	—	—	—	—	The Bodyguard: Original Soundtrack Album
1994	"Betcha by Golly, Wow"	—	—	—	—	32	—	—	The Grand Tour
1995	"Can't Stop My Heart from Loving You (The Rain Song)"	99	23	—	—	—	—	—	The Tattooed Heart
1995	"For the Good Times"	—	—	—	—	—	—	—	The Tattooed Heart
1996	"Use Me"	—	—	93	—	—	—	—	The Tattooed Heart
1996	"Crazy Love" (with Robbie Robertson)	—	25	—	—	—	—	—	Phenomenon: Music from the Motion Picture
1997	"Say What's in My Heart"	—	26	—	—	—	—	—	To Make Me Who I Am
2006	"It's All Right"^{A}	—	28	—	—	—	—	—	Bring It On Home...
"—" denotes releases that did not chart

- ^{A} "It's All Right" peaked at No. 12 on Hot Contemporary Jazz Songs chart

=== Guest singles ===
Year	Title	Artist	Peak chart positions						Certifications	Album
Year	Title	Artist	US	US AC	AUS	CAN	CAN AC	UK	Certifications	Album
1989	"Don't Know Much"	Linda Ronstadt	2	1	2	4	1	2	BPI: Silver	Cry Like a Rainstorm, Howl Like the Wind
1990	"All My Life"	Linda Ronstadt	11	1	—	10	1	96		Cry Like a Rainstorm, Howl Like the Wind
1990	"When Something Is Wrong with My Baby"	Linda Ronstadt	78	5	—	29	10	—		Cry Like a Rainstorm, Howl Like the Wind
1996	"That's What My Love Is For"	Anne Murray	—	—	—	—	15	—		Anne Murray
"—" denotes releases that did not chart

=== Music videos ===
Year	Video	Director
1989	"Don't Know Much"	
1991	"Everybody Plays The Fool"	
1993	"Don't Take Away My Heaven"	Zack Snyder
1993	"The Grand Tour"	Jim Shea
1993	"Please Come Home for Christmas"	Bronwen Hughes
1994	"I Fall to Pieces" (w/ Trisha Yearwood)	Charley Randazzo
1995	"Can't Stop My Heart From Loving You (The Rain Song)"	
1995	"For the Good Times"	Jim Shea
1995	"Use Me"	
2006	"Stand By Me"	

== Awards and honors ==
- 32nd Grammy Awards – Best Pop Performance by a Duo or Group with Vocal – "Don't Know Much" with Linda Ronstadt (winner)
- 33rd Grammy Awards – Best Pop Performance by a Duo or Group with Vocal – "All My Life" with Linda Ronstadt (winner)
- 34th Grammy Awards – Best Male Pop Vocal Performance – Warm Your Heart (nominee)
- 36th Grammy Awards – Best Male Pop Vocal Performance – "Don't Take Away My Heaven" (nominee)
- 36th Grammy Awards – Best Male Country Vocal Performance – "The Grand Tour" (nominee)
- 37th Grammy Awards – Best Country Collaboration with Vocals – "I Fall To Pieces" with Trisha Yearwood (winner)
- 41st Grammy Awards – Best Traditional R&B Performance – "To Make Me Who I Am" (nominee)
- 65th Grammy Awards – Best American Roots Performance – "Stompin' Ground" with Dirty Dozen Brass Band (winner)

== Filmography ==
- Everybody's All-American (1988)
- Zandalee (1991)
- The Fan (1996)
- Mulholland Falls (1996)
- Boycott (2001)
- Sandy Wexler (2017) Netflix
- Linda Ronstadt: The Sound of My Voice (2019)
