= Cyril Neville =

American percussionist and singer (born 1948)

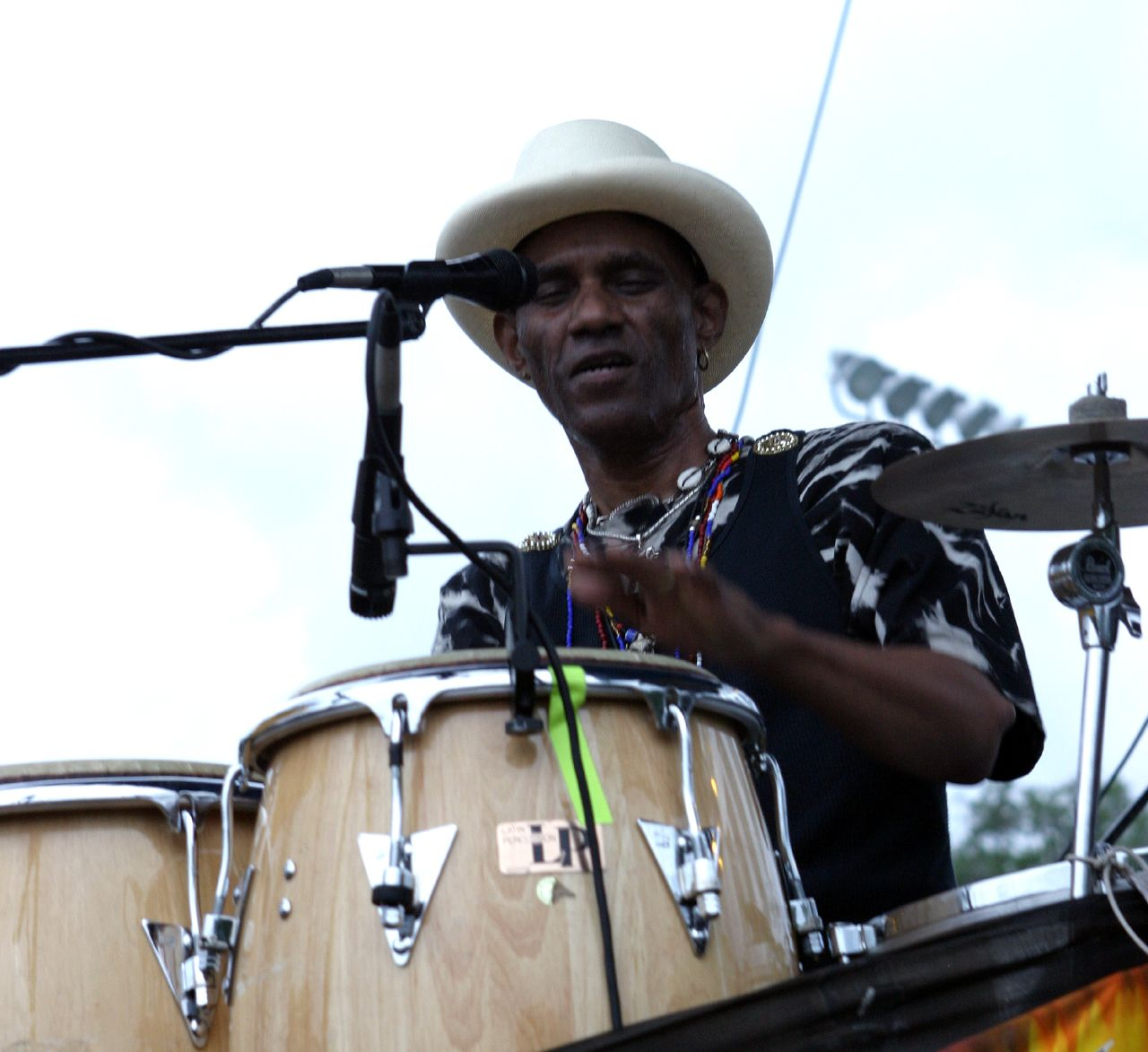
- Neville performing in 2007

Background information
- Born: Cyril Garrett Neville; October 10, 1948 (age 77); New Orleans
- Origin: New Orleans, Louisiana, U.S.
- Genres: R&B, funk, blues
- Occupation: Musician
- Instrument: Percussion
- Label: M.C. Records

Cyril Garrett Neville (born October 10, 1948) is an American percussionist and vocalist who first came to prominence as a member of his brother Art Neville's funky New Orleans–based band, The Meters. He joined Art in the Neville Brothers band upon the dissolution of the Meters.

== Career ==
He has appeared on recordings by Bob Dylan, Robbie Robertson, Edie Brickell, Willie Nelson, Dr. John and The New Orleans Social Club among others.

Neville is interviewed on screen and appears in performance footage with The Neville Brothers in the 2005 documentary film Make It Funky!, which presents a history of New Orleans music and its influence on rhythm and blues, rock and roll, funk and jazz. In the film, the band performs "Fire on the Bayou" with guests Ivan and Ian Neville. Neville was also featured in the 2006 documentary film New Orleans Music in Exile.

In 2005, Neville joined up with Tab Benoit for the Voice of the Wetlands Allstars to bring awareness to Louisiana's rapid loss of wetlands along the Gulf Coast. The band also features Waylon Thibodeaux, Johnny Sansone, Anders Osborne, Monk Boudreaux, George Porter Jr., Johnny Vidacovich, and Dr. John. The band has become a main feature at the annual New Orleans Jazz & Heritage Festival.

After Hurricane Katrina he moved to Austin, Texas, but as of 2012 lives in Slidell, Louisiana. Soul Rebels Brass Band featured Neville as a special guest on their Rounder Records debut record, Unlock Your Mind, released on January 31, 2012. The Soul Rebels' name was conceived by Neville at the New Orleans venue Tipitina's, where the band was opening.

In 2010, Neville joined popular New Orleans funk band Galactic. He put aside his solo career to tour internationally with the band.

In 2012, Cyril Neville joined forces with Devon Allman (son of Gregg Allman of The Allman Brothers Band), award-winning blues-rock guitarist Mike Zito, bassist Charlie Wooton, and Grammy-winning drummer Yonrico Scott to form Royal Southern Brotherhood, a blues-rock supergroup.

== Citations ==
- "Cyril Neville may be the youngest of the Neville Brothers, the first family of New Orleans rock and R&B, but he has just made his best album". – Billboard
- "a refreshingly original approach to the music" (*** 1/2) – Chicago Sun-Times

== Discography ==
- 1994: The Fire This Time (Endangered Species) with The Uptown Allstars
- 1998: Soulo (Endangered Species) solo album
- 2000: New Orleans Cookin' (Endangered Species) solo album
- 2003: For The Funk Of It (Kongo Square) with The Uptown Allstars
- 2007: The Healing Dance (Jomar/Silk) with Tribe 13
- 2009: Brand New Blues (M.C.) solo album
- 2012: Royal Southern Brotherhood (Ruf) with Royal Southern Brotherhood
- 2012: Live in Germany (Ruf) with Royal Southern Brotherhood
- 2013: Magic Honey (Ruf) solo album
- 2014: Heartsoulblood (Ruf) with Royal Southern Brotherhood
- 2015: Don't Look Back (Ruf) with Royal Southern Brotherhood
- 2026: Don't Wait Til I'm Gone solo album

== Awards and honors ==
As a member of the Neville Brothers, Cyril won the 1989 Grammy Award for Best Pop Instrumental Performance for the song "Healing Chant".

In 1996, he and his brothers were nominated for the Grammy Award for Best Pop Performance by a Duo or Group with Vocals for the song "Fire on the Mountain".

They were also nominated for the 1999 Grammy Award for Best Traditional R&B Vocal Performance for the album Valence Street.

In 2014, Neville (as a solo) was nominated for a Blues Music Award in the 'Contemporary Blues Album of the Year' category for his album Magic Honey.
