= List of Connecticut College alumni =

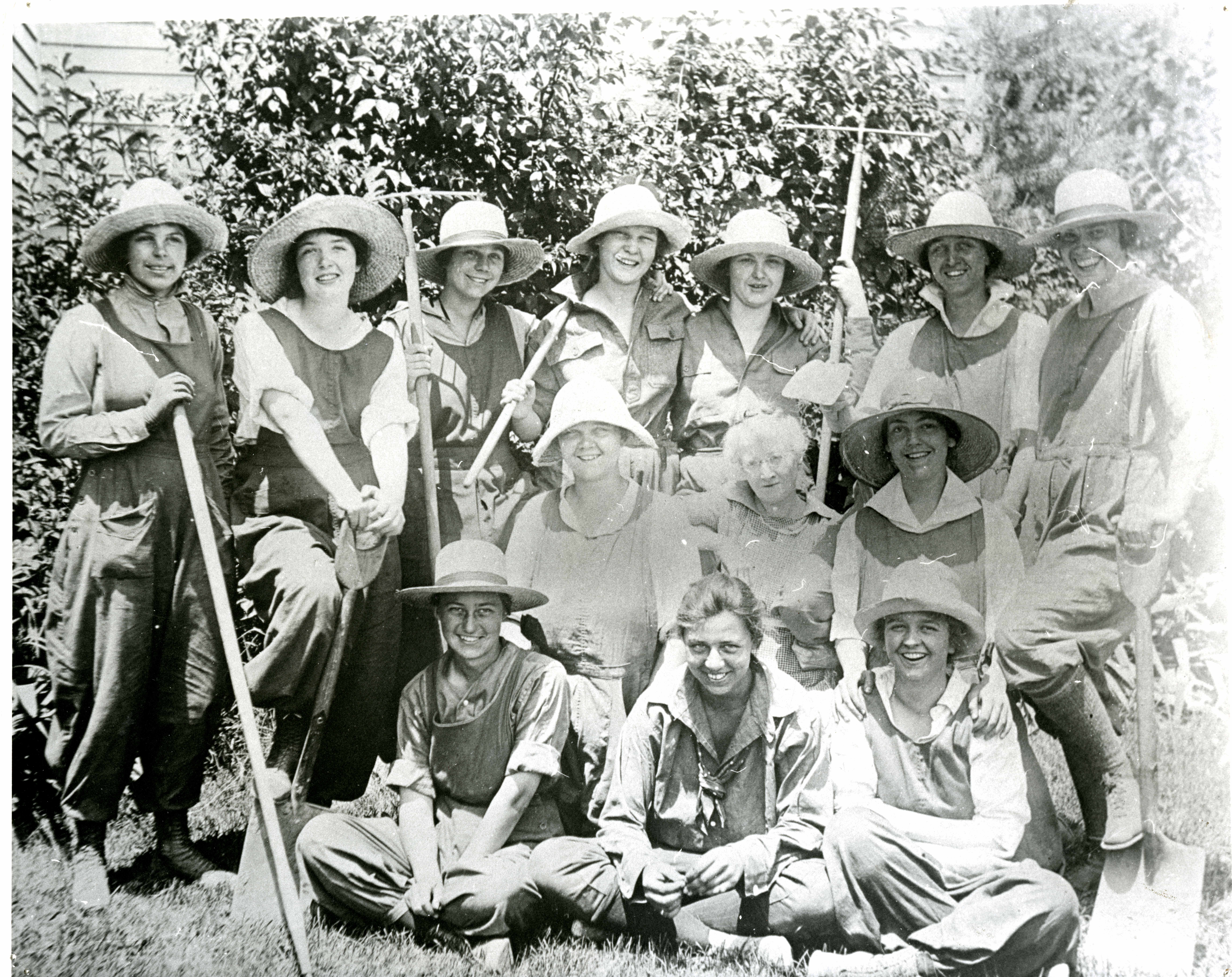
A unit of thirteen Connecticut College students pose in their worker's uniforms in 1917. During World War I, they worked as farmerettes.

This is a list of notable alumni of Connecticut College.

== Literature and poetry ==
- Michael Collier ('76): Poet Laureate of Maryland, 2001–2004; Director of The Bread Loaf Writers' Conference, Middlebury College
- Dobby Gibson ('93): poet
- Aracelis Girmay ('99): poet
- Cecelia Holland ('65): novelist
- Gayl Jones ('72): novelist, poet, playwright
- William Lychack ('88): novelist
- Luanne Rice ('77): novelist

== Authors and writers ==
- Sloane Crosley ('00): best-selling author; essayist; publicist with Vintage Books
- David Grann ('89): journalist and best-selling and staff writer at The New Yorker
- Joshua Green ('94): senior national correspondent at Bloomberg Businessweek and a weekly columnist for the Boston Globe
- Jazmine Hughes ('12): writer and editor; currently a story editor at The New York Times Magazine
- Nan Kempner ('52): socialite, contributing editor of Vogue
- Elizabeth Peer ('57): journalist; first female foreign bureau chief at Newsweek
- A. B. Stoddard ('89): journalist, political commentator, associate editor of The Hill

== Academia ==
- Edward Burger ('85): professor of mathematics, Williams College
- Deborah Carr ('88): distinguished professor of sociology, Boston University, member of American Academy of Arts and Sciences
- Martha Chen: lecturer in public policy, Harvard Kennedy School
- Cynthia Enloe ('60): research professor of international relations and women's studies, Clark University
- Haden Guest ('93): director of the Harvard Film Archive, and lecturer at Harvard University
- David Haussler ('75): professor at University of California, Santa Cruz, member of National Academy of Sciences and American Academy of Arts and Sciences
- Roxanne Johnson: chemist working at United States Environmental Protection Agency
- Mark Samuels Lasner: Senior Research Fellow at the University of Delaware
- Shelley Taylor ('68): social psychologist, pioneer in health psychology, winner of Distinguished Scientific Contribution Award from APA
- Ellen Vitetta ('64): director, Cancer Immunobiology Center, University of Texas Southwestern Medical Center National Acad. Sciences; Institute of Medicine; American Acad. Arts and Sciences

== Design, art, and art history ==
- Agnes Gund: philanthropist, art patron and collector, advocate for arts education
- Christine Y. Kim: associate curator of contemporary art at Los Angeles County Museum of Art; former associate curator at the Studio Museum in Harlem
- Peter Som ('93): fashion designer, winner of the 2002 Ecco Domani Fashion Foundation prize
- Marcia Tucker: first female curator of the Whitney Museum; founding director of the New Museum of Contemporary Art

== Television and radio ==
- H. Jon Benjamin ('88): actor, comedian and writer best known for his voice-over roles
- Molly Cheek ('73): It's Garry Shandling's Show
- Lee Eisenberg ('99): writer and producer for The Office and the film Year One
- Chris Gifford ('81): co-creator of the Peabody Award-winning children's series Dora the Explorer
- Scott Lowell: actor, Queer as Folk
- Leland Orser ('82): actor
- Christof Putzel ('01): award-winning journalist and correspondent for Al Jazeera America
- Joan Rivers: actress, comedian; attended CC briefly, then transferred to Barnard College
- Susan Saint James: actress, Kate & Allie; attended CC, did not graduate
- Sam Seder: writer, actor, political commentator, radio host on Air America
- Alec Sulkin ('95): writer and executive producer on Family Guy, The Orville and the 85th Academy Awards
- Wellesley Wild ('94): writer and executive producer on Family Guy, The Orville and the 85th Academy Awards

== Film, theater and dance ==
- Chrystelle Trump Bond: dancer, choreographer, author, and dance historian
- Ted Chapin ('72): president and executive director, Rodgers and Hammerstein Organization
- Charles Chun ('90): actor; has appeared in Criminal Minds, Scrubs, Everybody Loves Raymond, Ned's Declassified School Survival Guide and How I Met Your Mother
- David Dorfman (MFA '81): Professor of Dance, chair of Dance Department, choreographer of modern dance
- Sean Fine ('96): winner of Academy Award for Best Documentary (Short Subject) for Inocente; director of Academy Award-nominated feature documentary War/Dance
- Jeffrey Finn ('92): Broadway producer, nominated for 2005 Tony Award for Best Revival of a Play for On Golden Pond
- Matthew Gentile ('12): film director and screenwriter, American Murderer
- Judy Irving ('68): Emmy Award and Sundance-winning filmmaker
- Raja Feather Kelly ('09): dancer and choreographer and serves as the artistic director of the New Brooklyn Theatre
- Leland Orser ('82): actor and director known for Taken, Taken 2 and Se7en
- Estelle Parsons ('49): stage, film, and television actor; winner of 1967 Academy Award for Best Supporting Actress for Bonnie and Clyde
- Kevin Wade ('76): screenwriter, Working Girl, Meet Joe Black

== National Theater Institute alumni (accredited by Connecticut College) ==
- Greg Allen
- Emily Bergl
- Adam Bock (The Receptionist)
- Gordon Clapp (NYPD Blue)
- Jack Coleman (Heroes)
- Rachel Dratch (SNL)
- Chris Elliott (SNL)
- Paul Hodes
- Kristina Klebe
- John Krasinski (The Office)
- Jeremy Piven (Grosse Point Blank, PCU)
- Michael Portnoy
- Sam Robards
- Kate Robin (Six Feet Under)
- Mark Teschner

== Music ==
- Sean Greenhalgh ('01): member of indie rock band Clap Your Hands Say Yeah
- Robbie Guertin ('02): member of indie rock band Clap Your Hands Say Yeah
- Vance Gilbert ('79): singer-songwriter, folk musician
- Chris Harford: singer, songwriter
- Alec Ounsworth ('00): member of indie rock band Clap Your Hands Say Yeah
- Lee Sargent ('00): member of indie rock band Clap Your Hands Say Yeah
- Tyler Sargent ('00): member of indie rock band Clap Your Hands Say Yeah
- Henrik Takkenberg ('90): musician, songwriter, producer

== Government, law and public policy ==
- Debo Adegbile ('91): lawyer in private practice who also serves as a Commissioner for the United States Civil Rights Commission
- Esther Batchelder (1919): nutritionist, home economist, head of Food and Nutrition division of the US Department of Agriculture
- Helen Lehman Buttenwieser ('27): lawyer, member of Lehman family
- Nina F. Elgo ('84): judge of the Connecticut Appellate Court
- Marie L. Garibaldi ('56): associate justice of the Supreme Court of New Jersey
- Catherine Gregg: philanthropist and First Lady of New Hampshire (1953–1955)
- Mary Ann Handley: Connecticut state senator
- Dorcas Hardy ('68): commissioner of the Social Security Administration
- Joanne Head: New Hampshire state representative
- Bruce Hoffman ('76): corporate chair in Counterterrorism and Counterinsurgency, director of the RAND Corporation's Washington Office, professor at Georgetown University
- Jay Hooper ('16): Vermont State Representative
- Joan R. Kemler ('47): first woman to serve as Connecticut State Treasurer (1986–87)
- Suzi Oppenheimer ('56): New York state senator
- Erik Raven ('96), United States Under Secretary of the Navy
- Sean Spicer ('93): 30th White House Press Secretary
- Jay Stamper ('95): Democratic candidate for U.S. Senate from South Carolina
- Susan Thomases ('65): attorney, presidential adviser
- Patricia McGowan Wald ('48): U.S. Court of Appeals for the District of Columbia judge; member of International Criminal Tribunal for the Former Yugoslavia; member of the Iraq Intelligence Commission
- Kimba Wood ('66): federal judge, U.S. District Court, Southern District of New York

== Business ==
- Tim Armstrong ('93): CEO of America Online (AOL); former Google Inc. vice president, Advertising Sales
- Ethan Brown (?): CEO of Beyond Meat
- Alice Rogoff: former wife of David Rubenstein

== Athletics ==
- Anita DeFrantz ('74): former vice president of the International Olympic Committee, member of bronze medal U.S. women's eight-oared shell, 1976 Montreal Summer Olympics
- Jim Gabarra ('82): Olympic soccer player
- Jeff Idelson ('86): former director of the National Baseball Hall of Fame and Museum
- AJ Marcucci ('21): professional soccer player for New York Red Bulls
- Jan Merrill ('79): Olympic long-distance runner
- Rand Pecknold ('90): current head coach of the Quinnipiac University Men's Ice Hockey team
- Tim Young ('92): Olympic silver medalist in quadruple sculling
- Maggie Shea ('11): Olympic sailor

== Other notable people associated with Connecticut College ==
- Blanche Boyd: Professor of English and Writing
- Pauline Hamilton Dederer: Professor of Biology
- Edward Harkness: Conn College benefactor, Standard Oil heir and advocate of the Harkness Table method
- Barkley Hendricks: Professor of Art
- Carl Kimmons ('73): US Navy officer; first person to rise through the Navy's ranks from mess attendant to commissioned officer
- Lillian Rosanoff Lieber: mathematician and author
- William Meredith: winner of the Pulitzer Prize for poetry, and Professor of English at the college, 1955–1983
- William Wuyke: former Venezuelan Olympian; strength and conditioning coach

== Presidents ==
- Frederick Henry Sykes: president, 1913–1917
- Benjamin T. Marshall: president, 1917–1928
- Katherine Blunt: president, 1929–1943, 1945–1946
- Dorothy Schafer: president, 1943–1945
- Rosemary Park: president, 1947–1962
- Charles E. Shain: president, 1962–1974
- Oakes Ames: president, 1974–1988
- Claire L. Gaudiani: president, 1988–2001
- David K. Lewis: interim president, 2001
- Norman Fainstein: president, 2001–2006
- Leo Higdon: president, 2006–2013
- Katherine Bergeron: president, 2014–2023
- Leslie Wong: interim president, 2023–2024
- Andrea Chapdelaine: president, 2024–present
