= Connie Wanek =

American poet (born 1952)

- Born: June 1, 1952 (age 73) Madison, Wisconsin
- Occupation: Poet
- Years active: 1997–present

Connie Wanek (born June 1, 1952) is an American poet.

== Life ==
She was born in Madison, Wisconsin, and grew up in Las Cruces, New Mexico. In 1989, she moved with her family to Duluth, Minnesota. She now divides her time between Minnesota and New Mexico.

Her work appeared in Poetry, The Atlantic Monthly, The Virginia Quarterly Review, Quarterly West, Poetry East, Prairie Schooner, and Missouri Review.

She has published four books of poetry, one book of short prose, and served as co-editor (with Joyce Sutphen and Thom Tammaro) of the comprehensive historical anthology of Minnesota women poets, called To Sing Along the Way (New Rivers Press, 2006). Ted Kooser, Poet Laureate of the United States (2004–2006), named her a Witter Bynner Fellow of the Library of Congress for 2006.

== Awards ==
- Willow Poetry Prize
- Jane Kenyon Poetry Prize.
- 2006 Witter Bynner Fellowship of the Library of Congress by United States Poet Laureate Ted Kooser.
- 2009 George Morrison Artist of the Year

== Work ==
- Bonfire: poems. New Rivers Press. 1997. ISBN 978-0-89823-178-6.
- Hartley Field: poems. Holy Cow! Press. 2002. ISBN 978-0-930100-99-5.
- On Speaking Terms. Copper Canyon Press. 2010. ISBN 978-1-55659-294-2.
- Rival Gardens. University of Nebraska Press. 2016. ISBN 978-0-8032-6964-4.
- Summer Cars. Will o' the Wisp Books. 2014. ISBN 978-0-9793128-6-1.
- Consider the Lilies: Mrs. God Poems. 2018. ISBN 978-1-7220805-0-1.
- Marshmallow Clouds: Two Poets At Play Among Figures Of Speech. (w/Ted Kooser, Illustrator: Richard Jones) 2022. ISBN 978-1536203035.

=== Anthologies ===
- Joyce Sutphen; Thom Tammaro; Connie Wanek, eds. (2006). To Sing Along the Way: Minnesota Women Poets from Pre-Territorial Days to the Present. New Rivers Press. ISBN 978-0-89823-232-5.
- Billy Collins, ed. (2003). Poetry 180: a turning back to poetry. Random House Trade Paperbacks. ISBN 978-0-8129-6887-3.
