= Alec Ounsworth =

American singer-songwriter

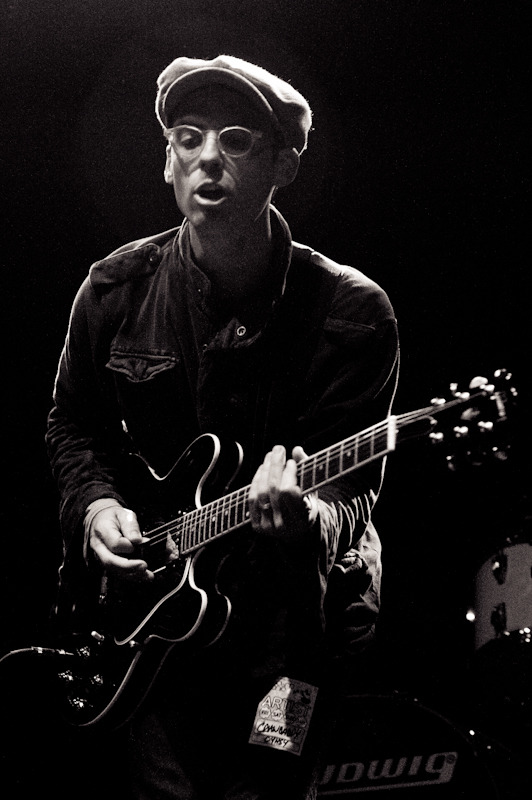

Background information
- Born: December 1, 1977 (age 48)
- Origin: Philadelphia, Pennsylvania, United States
- Genres: Indie rock, folk rock

Alec Ounsworth (born December 1, 1977) is an American singer, songwriter, guitarist and frontman of indie rock band Clap Your Hands Say Yeah. He is also a member of The Pelican Picnic and Flashy Python. His first solo album, Mo Beauty was released October 20, 2009, on Anti- Records.

== History ==
Ounsworth was born in Pennsylvania and grew up in Mount Airy, Philadelphia. Around his mid-teens, he started writing and recording music — a hobby that would stay near to him throughout his time as a student at Connecticut College. In college, he shared a dorm room with Lee Sargent during their first year. They would both graduate in 2000.

Sargent, who had a special interest in Ounsworth's songs, contacted him in 2004 via Friendster about starting a band. After several contacts, Clap Your Hands Say Yeah was formed, and the band started playing live shows and recording demos.

Prior to the success of Clap Your Hands Say Yeah, Ounsworth released several home demos of his work onto the internet, many of them being early versions of songs that Clap Your Hands Say Yeah would record. All ties between him and the files have been severed, as both flashypython.com and his MySpace page have been deleted. The files are still distributed among fans over the Internet.

== Musical equipment ==
Ounsworth's collection of guitars includes two Fender Telecasters, a Fender Stratocaster, a Gibson Hummingbird, and a Gibson SG. He also has at least four acoustic guitars, two of which are made by Gibson. On April 4, 2007, he sported a Gibson Flying V guitar on Clap Your Hands Say Yeah's appearance on Late Night with Conan O'Brien.

He employs the Vox AC30 amp to produce the sound he desires. On his tours with Clap Your Hands Say Yeah, he has played through a 4x10 Fender Hot Rod DeVille.

== Personal life ==
On January 12, 2007, Ounsworth married Emily Jean Stock, who is the inspiration behind the song of the same name on the album Some Loud Thunder. In 2008, they had a daughter, Rosemary. In 2020, Ounsworth and Emily Jean Stock divorced.

== Discography ==
=== Solo albums ===
- 2009: Mo Beauty

=== with Clap Your Hands Say Yeah ===
- 2005: Clap Your Hands Say Yeah
- 2007: Some Loud Thunder
- 2007: Live at Lollapalooza 2007: Clap Your Hands Say Yeah
- 2011: Hysterical
- 2014: Only Run
- 2017: The Tourist
- 2021: New Fragility

=== with Flashy Python ===
- 2009: Skin and Bones
