= Robbie Guertin =

American singer

- Robbie Guertin performing live at the Middle East Downstairs in Cambridge, MA on November 12, 2007.

Background information
- Origin: Belmont, Massachusetts, USA
- Genres: Indie rock

Robbie Guertin is a former keyboardist/guitarist/backup vocalist for the indie rock band Clap Your Hands Say Yeah and a drummer/vocalist for the band Radical Dads.

== History ==
Robbie grew up in Belmont, Massachusetts and went to Belmont High School. He attended college at Connecticut College along with the other members of Clap Your Hands Say Yeah prior to the group's formation where he studied art. Robbie is featured in The Warhol Economy: How Fashion Art & Music Drive New York City in regards to Clap Your Hands Say Yeah.

Robbie was also the primary art director and often the artist for all of Clap Your Hands Say Yeah's album and single covers, as well as several concert posters. The first album's artwork was a collaboration with artist Dasha Shishkin.

On July 3, 2012 Guertin publicly announced that after a final show in New York City on July 7, he would no longer be a member of Clap Your Hands Say Yeah.

Robbie and Dasha Shishkin also collaborated to create BB&PPINC. They were one of the artists featured in By Hand: The Use of Craft in Contemporary Art. BB&PPINC had a solo exhibition and book release party at About Glamour Gallery in Brooklyn .

Robbie was also in the band Uninhabitable Mansions which also featured Tyler Sargent from Clap Your Hands Say Yeah along with Annie Hart from Au Revoir Simone, along with Chris Diken. Uninhabitable Mansions is also an art collective and record label.

Robbie currently plays drums and sings in the band Radical Dads

== Discography ==
=== with Clap Your Hands Say Yeah ===
- 2005: Clap Your Hands Say Yeah
- 2007: Some Loud Thunder
- 2007: Live at Lollapalooza 2007: Clap Your Hands Say Yeah
- 2011: Hysterical

=== with Uninhabitable Mansions ===
- 2009: "We Misplaced a Cobra in the Uninhabitable Mansion" 7-inch single
- 2009: 'Nature is a Taker" LP

=== with Radical Dads ===
- 2010: "Recklessness" 7-inch single
- 2011: 'Mega Rama" LP
- 2011: "Skateboard Bulldog" 7-inch single
- 2012: "Torrential Zen" 7-inch split single
- 2013: 'Rapid Reality" LP
- 2013: "Creature Out" 7-inch single
- 2014: "Cassette Brain" Cassette Tape EP
- 2015: "Universal Coolers" LP
- 2020: "Paved Mountain" LP
