= Benjamin Vogt =

Benjamin Vogt may refer to:

- Benjamin Vogt (poet) (born 1976), American poet and essayist
- Benjamin Vogt (politician) (1863–1947), Norwegian politician
- Benjamin Vogt (footballer), Liechtensteiner footballer
