= Maya Pindyck =

American poet and scholar (born 1978)

Maya Pindyck (born 1978) is an American poet, scholar, and visual artist. She is director of writing and a professor at Moore College of Art and Design.

== Biography ==
Pindyck grew up in Newton, Massachusetts, United States and Tel Aviv, Israel, attending K-12 schools in both Boston and Tel Aviv. She is Jewish, and was raised secular. She earned her Bachelor of Arts in fine arts and philosophy from Connecticut College. She has a Master of Fine Arts in poetry from Sarah Lawrence College, and a PhD in English education from Columbia University's Teacher's College. Her chapbook Locket, Master earned her a fellowship from the Poetry Society of America. She has shared that creating visual art is what first led her into poetry.

She is a director of writing and a professor of liberal arts at Moore College of Art and Design.

Her favorite writers include Sherman Alexie, Anne Carson, and Lucille Clifton.

== Recognition ==
Pindyck has received several grants, including a National Endowment for the Arts fellowship in 2019. She was awarded the 2021 Philip Levine Prize for Poetry.

Her collection Friend Among Stones won New Rivers Press' Many Voices Project Award.

== Works ==
Pindyck is the author of the following works:

- Impossible Belonging (Anhinga Press, 2023)
- A Poetry Pedagogy for Teachers (Bloomsbury, 2022)
- Emoticoncert (Four Way Books, 2016)
- Friend Among Stones (New Rivers Press, 2009)
- Locket, Master (chapbook, 2006)

She has had poems published in Granta (Hebrew edition), Los Angeles Review, Massachusetts Review, Pleiades, Quarterly West, and Seneca Review.

Pindyck is also a visual artist, and has exhibited her work in galleries in the United States and Germany. She also created the cover art for Philadelphia-based Clap Your Hands Say Yeah's album Hysterical.
