= Mo Beauty =

Studio album by Alec Ounsworth
- Released: October 20, 2009
- Recorded: 2009, Piety St. Studios, New Orleans, Louisiana
- Genres: Folk, indie rock
- Label: Anti- Records
- Producer: Steve Berlin

Professional ratings
Review scores
Source	Rating
American Songwriter	link
The A.V. Club	(B) link
onethirtybpm	(74%) link
Paste	(81/100) link
Pitchfork Media	(7.7/10) link
PopMatters	(5/10) link
Robert Christgau	(dud)
Slant Magazine	link
Spin	link
Stereo Subversion	(6/10) link
Under the Radar	(6/10) link

Mo Beauty is the debut album by Clap Your Hands Say Yeah frontman Alec Ounsworth. It was released October 20, 2009, on Anti- Records. In August 2009, Ounsworth released Skin and Bones as Flashy Python.

The title is the name of shop in the Tremé section of New Orleans, a photograph of which is on the album cover.

== Track listing ==
1. "Modern Girl (...With Scissors)"
2. "Bones in the Grave"
3. "Holy, Holy, Holy Moses (Song for New Orleans)"
4. "That Is Not My Home (After Bruegel)"
5. "Idiots in the Rain"
6. "South Philadelphia (Drug Days)"
7. "What Fun."
8. "Me and You, Watson"
9. "Obscene Queen Bee #2"
10. "When You've No Eyes"
11. "Dr. So and So" (iTunes only Bonus Track)
12. "Big Microscope" (iTunes only Bonus Track)
13. "Dim Wit Road" (iTunes only Bonus Track)

== Personnel ==
- Alec Ounsworth - Vocals, Guitar
- George Porter Jr. - Bass guitar
- Stanton Moore – Drums
- Robert Walter – Keyboards, B3 Organ
- Matt Sutton – Baritone and Pedal Steel Guitars
- Steve Berlin - Producer
- Mark Mullins, Craig Klein, Greg Hicks, Washboard Chaz, Shannon Powell, John Boute, Al "Carnival Time" Johnson, and Meschiya Lake. - Various Instrumentation
