= Robert Lacy (disambiguation) =

Robert Lacy is a writer.

Robert Lacy may also refer to:

- Robert Lacy (MP) for Stamford (UK Parliament constituency)
- Robert Lacy, Bishop of Limerick

== See also ==
- Robert de Lacy, two barons of Pontefract
- Robert Lacey (disambiguation)
