= Sean Greenhalgh =

Sean Greenhalgh may refer to:

- Sean Greenhalgh (lacrosse)
- Sean Greenhalgh (musician)

== See also ==
- Shaun Greenhalgh, British artist and former art forger
