= Robert Lacy =

Robert Lacy (born 1930s) is an American writer whose short stories and essays have been published in a large number of publications including The Best American Short Stories, Ploughshares, The Oxford American, Virginia Quarterly Review and The Gettysburg Review. He has also published several books of fiction and essays.

== Life ==
Lacy was born and raised in east Texas, and served in the United States Marines Corps from 1955 to 1959. He received his Bachelor of Journalism degree from the University of Texas, Austin (1962) before enrolling in the Iowa Writers' Workshop at the University of Iowa, where he was a student of Richard Yates. He earned his Master of Fine Arts degree in 1966. He taught Creative Writing in the Department of English, University of Oregon (1966–1969) and in the Department of English, Slippery Rock College (1969–1972). He left academia for journalism and briefly became a reporter and copyeditor for the Minneapolis Star Tribune. He was appointed Research Analyst and then Assistant Director of the Office of Senate Research in the Minnesota Senate (1973–1983). He resumed a journalistic career when he became a columnist and reviewer for the Minneapolis Star Tribune, 1987-1998 and also resumed a teaching career when he was an Adjunct Faculty Member in the Program of Creative and Professional Writing, University of Minnesota, 1990-1995. He also served as a faculty member of the Loft Literary Center from 1989 to 2003. He lives in Medicine Lake, Minnesota.

== Writing career ==
Lacy has published a large number of short stories and essays in magazines and literary journals such as The Oxford American, Ploughshares, The Gettysburg Review, Shenandoah, Virginia Quarterly Review, The Sewanee Review and other places. He has also been reprinted in anthologies including The Best American Short Stories, The Best of Crazyhorse: Thirty Years of Poetry and Fiction, A Ghost at Heart's Edge: Stories and Poems of Adoption, and The Next Parish Over: A Collection of Irish American Writing.

His fiction was first collected in book form in The Natural Father: Stories, released in 1997 by New Rivers Press. Since then two subsequent collections of his fiction have been released, I Remember Highway 80: Stories and Happy Birthday, Dear Darrell and Other Stories, released in 2017 and 2019 respectively by Stephen F. Austin State University Press.

In 2021, Stephen F. Austin State University Press released The House on Brown Street, a collection of his essays. Among Lacy's notable essays is "Icarus," published in the fall 2003 issue of North Dakota Quarterly and focusing on Arnold Samuelson, who in 1934 hitchhiked from Minneapolis to Key West to meet Ernest Hemingway and later wrote a book about the author. The essay follows Samuelson's life after he spent a year with Hemingway, with Lacy comparing Samuelson to Icarus, who flew too close to the sun.

== Reviews ==
William Kittredge said that "Robert Lacy's stories are direct, honest, grace-filled, and useful. We see ourselves in the mirror of their transactions, and we are moved to forgive and love one another. The Natural Father is that good thing, a book that both sweetens and illuminates our lives."

== Bibliography ==
=== Books ===
- The House on Brown Street, Stephen F. Austin State University Press, 2021.
- Happy Birthday, Dear Darrell and Other Stories, Stephen F. Austin State University Press, 2019
- I Remember Highway 80: Stories, Stephen F. Austin State University Press, 2017.
- The Natural Father: Stories, New Rivers Press, 1997.

=== Selected short stories ===
- "Win a Few Lose a Few", The Saturday Evening Post, Volume 238, Issue 25, December 18, 1965.
- "The Natural Father", Crazyhorse
- "Up in the Ozarks", South Dakota Review, Fall 1997
- "Donald Ross is Dying", Ploughshares, Spring 1989
- "Second Wives" The Antioch Review, Volume 54.1, Winter 1996, page 95
- "Verlin", The Antioch Review, Volume 114.1, Winter 2006, page 143-148
- "Occurrence at 133 Park Street, Apartment 2A", The Carolina Quarterly, Volume 59.1, Winter 2008, page 48

=== Selected essays ===
- "Three Snapshots from a Minneapolis Album", North Stone Review, 2002
- "Icarus," North Dakota Quarterly Volume 70 Number 4, Fall 2003
- "A Season In the Dismal Trade," The Virginia Quarterly Review, Winter 2003, pp. 134–142
- "Sing a Song of Sonny", Sewanee Review, Volume 114, Number 1, Spring 2005 pp. 309–316
- "From Here to Eternity and the American Experience," Sewanee Review - Volume 115, Number 4, Fall 2007, pp. 641–646
- "A Reason to Write," Sewanee Review - Volume 115, Number 1, Winter 2007, pp. 110–115
- "Threnody for Henry," Shenandoah, Washington and Lee University
- "Joyce", North Dakota Quarterly, Volume 75 Number 1, Winter 2008
- "Malcolm Lowry's Under the Volcano", North Dakota Quarterly, Volume 75.1, Winter 2008 ISSN 0029-277X

== Awards and honors ==
- Loft McNight Fellowship, Minnesota, 1984.
- Winner, Midwest Voices fiction competition, 1985.
- Winner, Midwest Voices fiction competition, 1996.
- Winner of the Maureen Egen Writers Exchange Award
- Finalist, Minnesota Book Awards
- Notable essay citations in the 2002, 2005, 2006, 2009, and 2013 editions of The Best American Essays
