= Washboard (musical instrument) =

Musical percussion instrument

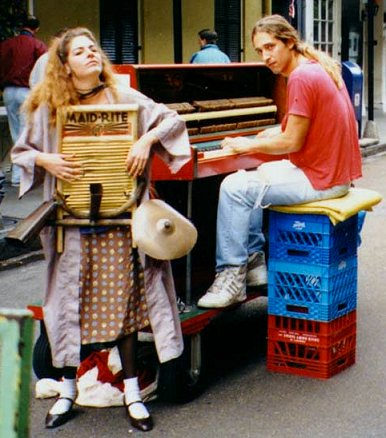
Washboard player accompanying piano

The washboard and frottoir (from Louisiana French "frotter", to rub) are used as a percussion instrument, employing the ribbed metal surface of the cleaning device as a rhythm instrument. As traditionally used in jazz, zydeco, skiffle, jug band, and old-time music, the washboard remains in its wooden frame and is played primarily by tapping, but also by scraping with thimbles. Often the washboard has additional traps, such as a wood block, a cowbell, and even small cymbals.

Conversely, the frottoir (zydeco rubboard) dispenses with the frame and consists simply of the metal ribbing hung around the neck. It is played primarily with spoon handles or bottle openers in a combination of strumming, scratching, tapping and rolling.

The frottoir or vest frottoir is played as a stroked percussion instrument, often in a band with a drummer, while the washboard generally is a replacement for drums.

There is a Polish traditional jazz festival and music award named "Złota Tarka" (Golden Washboard). In Ukrainian folk music, washboards, or "zatulas", are also occasionally used.

== Performance ==
A washboard being played

There are three general ways of deploying the washboard for use as an instrument. The first, mainly used by American players like Washboard Chaz of the Washboard Chaz Blues Trio and Ralf Reynolds of the Reynolds Brothers Rhythm Rascals, is to drape it vertically down the chest. The second, used by European players like David Langlois of the Blue Vipers of Brooklyn, Ben Turner of Piedmont Bluz, and Stephane Seva of Paris Washboard, is to hold it horizontally across the lap, or, for more complex setups, to mount it horizontally on a purpose-built stand. The third (and least common) method, used by Washboard Sam, Súle Greg Wilson of the Carolina Chocolate Drops and Sankofa Strings, and Deryck Guyler, is to hold it in a perpendicular orientation between the legs while seated, so that both sides of the board might be played at the same time.

In a jug band, the washboard can also be stroked with a single whisk broom and functions as the drums for the band, playing only on the back-beat for most songs, a substitute for a snare drum.

In Zydeco bands, the frottoir is usually played with bottle openers, to make a louder sound. It tends to play counter-rhythms to the drummer.

In a four-beat measure, the washboard will stroke on the 2-beat and the 4-beat. Its best sound is achieved using a single steel-wire snare-brush or whisk broom. However, in a jazz setting, the washboard can also be played with thimbles on all fingers, tapping out much more complex rhythms, as in The Washboard Rhythm Kings, a full-sized band, and Newman Taylor Baker.

A frottoir is played with a stroking instrument (usually with spoon handles or a pair of bottle-openers) in each hand. In a 4-beat measure, the frottoir will be stroked 8 to 16 times. It plays more like a Latin percussion instrument, rather than as a drum. The rhythms used are often similar to those played on Guiro.

== History ==
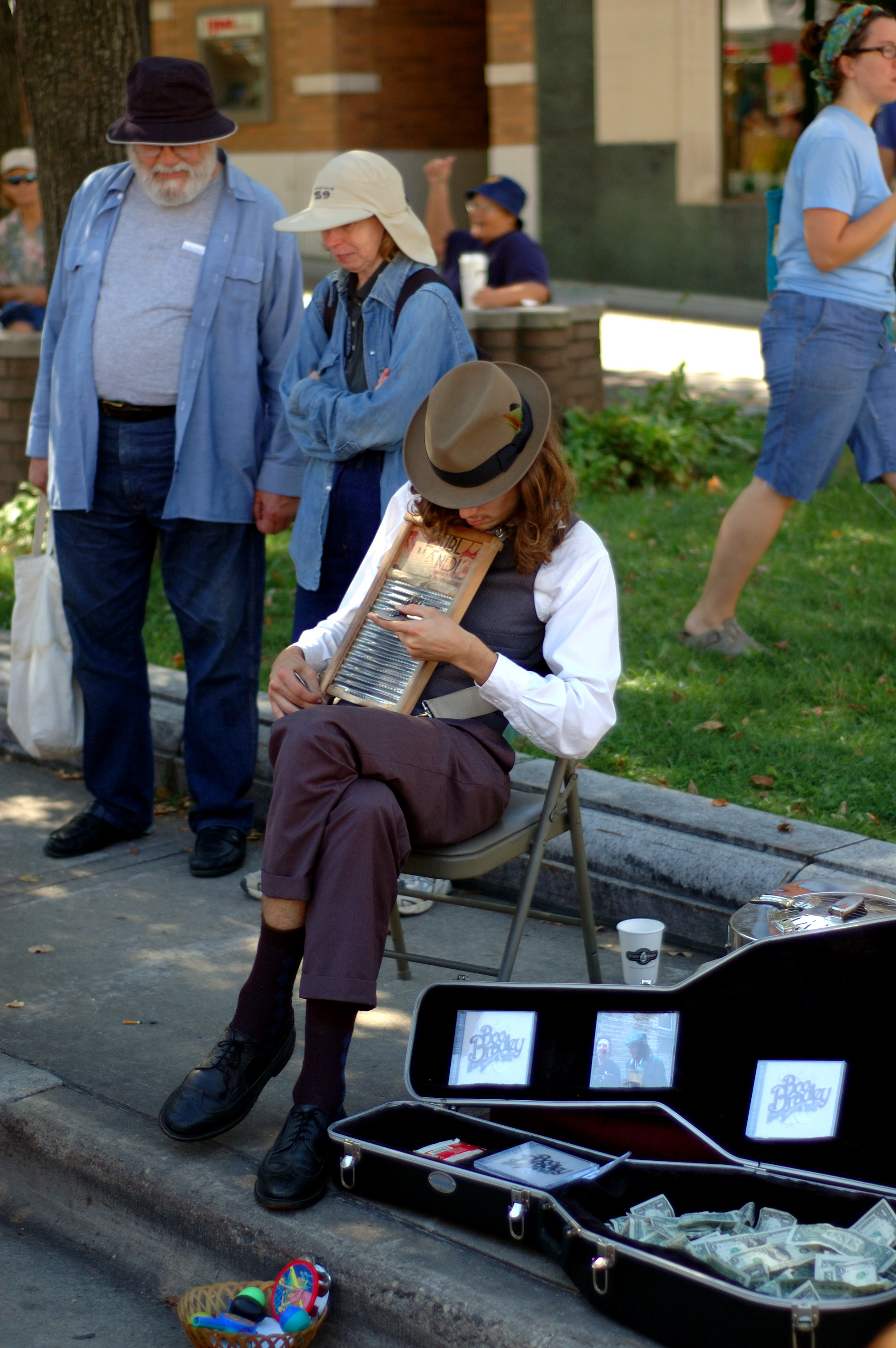
A busker in Madison, Wisconsin, playing a washboard

The washboard as a percussion instrument ultimately derives from the practice of hamboning as practiced in West Africa and brought to the new world by enslaved Africans. This led to the development of Jug bands which used jugs, spoons, and washboards to provide the rhythm. Jug bands became popular in the 1920s. Washboard Doc, Washboard Willie, and Washboard Sam were famous players.

The frottoir, also called a Zydeco rub-board, is a mid-20th century invention designed specifically for Zydeco music. It is one of the few musical instruments invented entirely in the United States and represents a distillation of the washboard into essential elements (percussive surface with shoulder straps). It was designed in 1946 by Clifton Chenier and fashioned by Willie Landry, a friend and metalworker at the Texaco refinery in Port Arthur, Texas. Clifton's brother Cleveland Chenier famously played this newly designed rubboard using bottle openers. Likewise, Willie's son, Tee Don Landry, continues the traditional hand manufacturing of rubboards in his small shop in Sunset, Louisiana, between Lafayette and Opelousas.

In 2010 Saint Blues Guitar Workshop launched an electric washboard percussion instrument called the Woogie Board.

== Notable players ==
In 1941, Spike Jones, known for playing the drums during the 1930s, started to perform with his washboard which would be his icon for his City Slickers that formed that same year.

In British Columbia, Canada, Tony McBride, known as "Mad Fingers McBride", performs with a group called The Genuine Jug Band. Tony is referred to as "The Canadian Washboard King". His percussion set-up was created by Douglas Fraser, of the same band. The washboard set-up was seen in Modern Drummer magazine, August 2014 edition. Also from Canada, Washboard Hank toured with Fred Eaglesmith.

Musician Steve Katz famously played washboard with the Even Dozen Jug Band. His playing can be heard on the group's self-titled Elektra recording from 1964. Katz reprised his washboard playing on Played a Little Fiddle, a 2007 recording featuring Steve Katz, Stefan Grossman and Danny Kalb. Katz's washboard approach is notable as he plays the instrument horizontally. Additionally, Katz uses fingerpicks instead of thimbles.

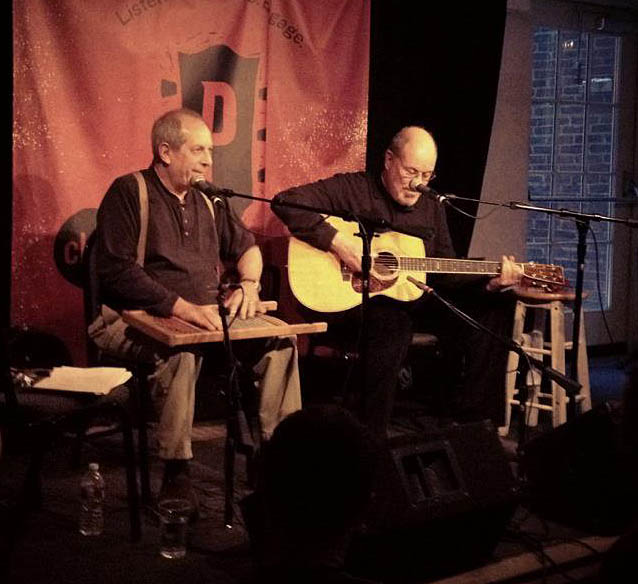
Steve Katz

In Belgium, Luc Brughmans uses it in te "La planche à jazz" plays horizontally, with attachment to à snare harness.

In their earliest incarnations as The Quarrymen, The Beatles were a skiffle band, featuring Pete Shotton on washboard.

During their early years, Mungo Jerry frequently featured washboard on stage and on record, played by Joe Rush.

Tim "Thumper" Hogan, plays the washboard on three Grammy-nominated albums with The Muddy Basin Ramblers, based out of Taipei, Taiwan.

Jim "Dandy" Mangrum, lead singer of Southern rock band Black Oak Arkansas, is well known for incorporating the washboard into many of the band's songs, notably "When Electricity Came to Arkansas".

Self-taught Elizabeth Bougerol has made the washboard a key element of The Hot Sardines jazz band.

Cody Dickinson, a member of hill country blues bands the North Mississippi Allstars and Country Hill Revue plays an electrified washboard on a self-written track, "Psychedelic Sex Machine". The song is almost entirely centered around the sound of the washboard, captured by a small clip-on microphone. The sound is then sent through a wah-wah and other effects pedals to create a fresher, more innovative and up-to-date sound for the washboard.

Robin Rapuzzi is the washboard player for New Orleans old-time jazz band Tuba Skinny.

The English actor Deryck Guyler was well known for his washboard-playing skills.

At least one player has twice appeared at Carnegie Hall.

Washboard Chaz (Charles Leary) is a contemporary New Orleans–based blues musician appearing in the Playing for Change videos and currently plays regularly with several bands, including the Washboard Chaz Blues Trio, Tin Men, and Palmetto Bug Stompers. In 2026, he was featured on the cover of Living Blues magazine (issue 302), in a career retro by music journalist Robert H. Cataliotti.

Chris "Necro" Wilkinson played washboard for the punk rock and rhythm & blues group The Kings of Nuthin' and Meagan Michelle plays it for folk punk group Days N' Daze.
