= Clap Your Hands Say Yeah (album) =

Studio album by Clap Your Hands Say Yeah
- Released: June 28, 2005
- Recorded: 2005, Recording Studio, Brooklyn, New York and Providence, Rhode Island
- Genre: Indie rock
- Length: 38:36
- Label: Wichita
- Producer: Adam Lasus and Clap Your Hands Say Yeah. Keith Souza Engineered (tracks 2, 3, 5, 10–12), and Tyler Sargent (track 9)

Clap Your Hands Say Yeah chronology
Clap Your Hands Say Yeah (2005)	Some Loud Thunder (2007)

Singles from Clap Your Hands Say Yeah
- 1. "Is This Love?" Released: December 5, 2005; 2. "In This Home on Ice" Released: February 27, 2006; 3. "The Skin of My Yellow Country Teeth" Released: July 17, 2006

Professional ratings
Aggregate scores
Source	Rating
Metacritic	84/100
Review scores
Source	Rating
AllMusic	3.5/5 stars
Blender	4/5 stars
The Guardian	4/5 stars
The Irish Times	4/5 stars
Mojo	4/5 stars
NME	7/10
Pitchfork	9.0/10
Q	4/5 stars
Uncut	3/5 stars
The Village Voice	A−

Clap Your Hands Say Yeah is the debut studio album by American musical project Clap Your Hands Say Yeah, self-released in the United States on 28 June 2005, and released in the United Kingdom on 23 January 2006 by Wichita Recordings. Produced and mixed by Adam Lasus, the album and the band rose to fame after buzz and attention built up on various MP3 blogs and a very positive ("9.0/10") review from influential music website Pitchfork. Clap Your Hands Say Yeah was listed as one of the 50 most important recordings of the decade by National Public Radio's All Songs Considered.

The success of the album started after bassist Tyler Sargent began mailing out copies of the album from his apartment. As of November 2009, the album has sold more than 125,000 copies in the United States. Although the band still has no official record deal in the United States, they have signed a distribution deal to make the album available to a wider audience. In the UK, the band signed to independent record label Wichita Recordings.

The song "The Skin of My Yellow Country Teeth" was featured on the 2005 episode "Email Surveillance" of the NBC show The Office as well as the 2011 film The Art of Getting By.

The album cover was created from a drawing by artist Dasha Shishkin and was designed, colored and lettered by group member Robbie Guertin.

== Track listing ==
All lyrics and music written by Alec Ounsworth except where indicated.

1. "Clap Your Hands!" – 1:48
2. "Let the Cool Goddess Rust Away" – 3:23
3. "Over and Over Again (Lost and Found)" – 3:09
4. "Sunshine and Clouds (And Everything Proud)" – 1:02
5. "Details of the War" – 3:31
6. "The Skin of My Yellow Country Teeth" – 5:43 (Ounsworth, Lee Sargent, Robbie Guertin, Tyler Sargent, Sean Greenhalgh)
7. "Is This Love?" – 3:11
8. "Heavy Metal" – 4:01
9. "Blue Turning Gray" – 1:17 (Tyler Sargent)
10. "In This Home on Ice" – 3:58
11. "Gimmie Some Salt" – 3:03
12. "Upon This Tidal Wave of Young Blood" – 4:34

=== Bonus tracks ===
The UK release, on Enhanced CD, contains a link to bonus live tracks. All songs were recorded live at The Black Cat in Washington, D.C., on 13 September 2005.

1. "Is This Love?"
2. "Details of the War"
3. "Gimmie Some Salt"
4. "In This Home on Ice"

== Personnel ==
- Sean Greenhalgh – Group Member
- Lee Sargent – Group Member
- Robbie Guertin – Group Member
- Joe Lambert – Mastering
- Adam Lasus – Producer, Engineer, Overdubs, Mixing
- Alec Ounsworth – Lead vocals, guitars
- Tyler Sargent – Engineer, Group Member
- Keith Souza – Engineer
