= Greg Kuzma =

American poet (born 1944)

Greg Kuzma (born July 14, 1944 in Rome, New York) is an American poet, essayist, poetry reviewer, and editor, who has written and published more than 30 books. Mostly in the 1970s, more than 300 of his poems were published in the nation's most prestigious journals. At that time, he founded the Best Cellar Press, under which he produced handset letterpress chapbooks giving other poets who have become some of America's best known poets an early audience, including U.S. Poet Laureate Ted Kooser, Albert Goldbarth, Wendell Berry, Alfred Starr Hamilton and Richard Shelton. The Best Cellar Press was the inspiration for the current Backwaters Press in Omaha. In the 1970s, Kuzma also founded the pioneering and influential literary magazine, Pebble. As an author, he has been largely collected by libraries worldwide.

== Works ==
Kuzma's poetry collections include Song for Someone Going Away and Other Poems (Ithaca House, 1971), Good News (Viking, 1973), and Selected Early Poems 1958–1983 (Carnegie Mellon University, 2010).

Kuzma is also the author of the essay collections What Poetry Is All About (1998) and A Book of Rereadings: Two (2008). Over more than forty years, his poetry has appeared in almost every notable literary publication in the nation: The New Yorker, The Paris Review, The Hudson Review, Poetry Northwest, Antioch Review, TriQuarterly, Witness and Poetry. Kuzma won the 1974 Theodore Roethke award for the best poem appearing that year in Poetry Northwest. He received a National Endowment for the Arts Literature Fellowship in 1981.

According to the Poetry Foundation's biography, Kuzma is "known among writers and former students as a brilliant, mercurial spirit, likely to forget more poetry than most of us will ever know," Kuzma's long free-verse poems often investigate the frame of personal memory. Kuzma has spoken about reading in the context of his experience as editor of a small press: “I am not even sure I believe in such a thing as good poetry.… There has not been a single poet, no matter how various my initial impressions, that has not brought something in me alive, to life, or sustained life.”

Greg Kuzma earned a BA and an MA at Syracuse University. Kuzma is professor emeritus at the University of Nebraska–Lincoln where he taught contemporary poetry and poetry writing from 1968 to 2011. Kuzma and his wife, Barb, live in Crete, Nebraska. Kuzma was inducted into the Rome (New York) Arts Hall of Fame in 2010.
