= In This Home on Ice =

Single by Clap Your Hands Say Yeah

from the album Clap Your Hands Say Yeah
- B-side: "Gimmie Some Salt" / "Cigarettes"
- Released: February 27, 2006
- Recorded: 2005
- Genre: Indie rock, alternative rock
- Label: Wichita Recordings
- Songwriter(s): Alex Ounsworth, Lee Sargent, Robbie Guertin, Tyler Sargent, Sean Greenhalgh
- Producer(s): Adam Lasus

Clap Your Hands Say Yeah singles chronology
"Is This Love?" (2005)	"In This Home on Ice" (2006)	"The Skin of My Yellow Country Teeth" (2006)

"In This Home on Ice" is a song by Brooklyn-based indie rock band Clap Your Hands Say Yeah, from their eponymous debut album. The song was released as a single in the United Kingdom by Wichita Recordings on February 27, 2006. The single was backed with another track from the eponymous album, "Gimmie Some Salt", and a non-album track, "Cigarettes." The single reached #68 on the UK Singles Chart.

== Track listing ==
=== CD single ===
1. "In This Home on Ice" – 3:58
2. "Gimmie Some Salt" (BBC 6Music Gideon Coe Session) – 3:03
3. "Cigarettes" (BBC 6Music Gideon Coe Session) – 3:10

=== 7" single ===
1. "In This Home on Ice"
2. "Upon This Tidal Wave of Young Blood" (BBC 6Music Gideon Coe Session)
