= Ted Kooser =

American poet (born 1939)

- Born: April 25, 1939 (age 87); Ames, Iowa, U.S.
- Education: Iowa State University (BS 1962); University of Nebraska–Lincoln (MA 1968)
- Occupations: Poet, professor
- Writing career
- Language: English
- Genres: Poetry, essays
- Notable works: Delights & Shadows (2004); The Poetry Home Repair Manual (2005)
- Notable awards: Pulitzer Prize for Poetry (2005); United States Poet Laureate (2004–2006)
- Website: www.tedkooser.net

Theodore J. Kooser (born April 25, 1939) is an American poet. He won the Pulitzer Prize in Poetry in 2005. He served as Poet Laureate Consultant in Poetry to the Library of Congress from 2004 to 2006. Kooser was one of the first poets laureate selected from the Great Plains, and is known for his conversational style of poetry.

== Biography ==
=== Early life ===
Ted Kooser was born in Ames, Iowa, on April 25, 1939. Growing up, Kooser attended Ames Public Schools for elementary and middle school. When Kooser arrived at Ames High School, his interest diverted from the library, and it went to cars. He joined the Nightcrawlers Car Club and became secretary of the group in 1956. His motivation for writing in high school can be in part credited to one of his teachers, Mary McNally, who encouraged him to continue writing essays and poems that reflected his life.

=== Education ===
Kooser graduated from Ames High School with a class of 175 students and enrolled at Iowa State University, the alma mater of his uncles. He began writing short nonfiction stories for the Iowa State student literary magazine. He also joined the Iowa State Writer's Round Table, which he credits for fine-tuning his writing skills; Iowa Senator Tom Harkin was also a part of the group. In 1961, Kooser moved to Marshalltown, Iowa, to student teach English classes. The following year he graduated with a BS in English education from Iowa State University and moved to Cedar Rapids, Iowa, to live with his parents. He was offered a graduate readership opportunity at the University of Nebraska and in 1963, he and his wife moved to Lincoln, Nebraska. After winning the Vreeland Award for poetry in 1964, he soon after lost his graduate readership from the University for his poor GPA. In 1967, he received his MA from Nebraska.

=== Career ===
After earning his MA, Kooser worked at Bankers Life Nebraska. He eventually went on to work for Lincoln Benefit Life (a subsidiary of Allstate), an insurance company, for 35 years before retiring as vice president at the age of 60. He wrote for an hour and a half before work every morning, and by the time he retired, Kooser had published seven books of poetry. Kooser taught as a Presidential Professor in the English department of the University of Nebraska–Lincoln and is currently a Professor Emeritus.

On August 12, 2004, he was named Poet Laureate Consultant in Poetry by the Librarian of Congress to serve a term from October 2004 through May 2005.

In April 2005, Theodore J. Kooser was appointed to serve a second term as Poet Laureate Consultant in Poetry. During that same week, Kooser received the 2005 Pulitzer Prize for Poetry for his book Delights & Shadows (Copper Canyon Press, 2004). Edward Hirsch wrote: "There is a sense of quiet amazement at the core of all Kooser's work, but it especially seems to animate his new collection of poems, Delights & Shadows."

Kooser's most recent books are Kindest Regards: New and Selected Poems and Red Stilts (2020).

He founded and hosted the newspaper project "American Life in Poetry". In 2020, Kooser chose Kwame Dawes, a chancellor of the Academy of American Poets, to be his successor as of January 1, 2021. Kooser also edits the Ted Kooser Contemporary Poetry series published by the University of Nebraska Press.

=== Midwest Poetry Renaissance ===
Ted Kooser was part of the Midwest Poetry Renaissance in the 1960s and 1970s. The Midwest Poetry Renaissance drew on elements of Rural America through a five-state swath of the Great Plains region. Poets of the Midwest were respected among artists throughout the country due to being informed of larger societal forces, such as the distrust of a media-driven culture.

More small presses opened up in that time, and Midwestern poets began publishing more work. Warren Woessner regards the catalyst of the MPR to be the anthology Heartland in 1967. The movement began to develop after that point, along with the works of Ted and other poets such as Victor Contoski, Mak Vinz, David Steinglass, Gary Gildner, James Hazard, Greg Kuzma, Judith Minty, and Kathy Weigner (as well as many others) who exemplified the rural subject matter and conversational tone. Most of the poets were in their twenties or early thirties and published their first books.

Ted was in his late twenties and thirties during the decade the Midwest Poetry Renaissance occurred. He published his first book through the University of Nebraska Press at age 30, titled "Official Entry Blank." Ted's first full-length book was already out of print by the early 1970s, at which time he became more of a small press poet like many other poets in the Midwest. Ted continued to receive publication of individual poems within anthologies and published several more books in small presses. He also began to edit The New Salt Creek Reader, which had six anthologies by 1974.

According to Warren Woessner, a poet during the Midwest Poetry Renaissance, the movement ended in 1975 with the publication of Heartland II.

=== Poetic Style ===
Ted Kooser is known for his conversational style of poetry that is accessible to a nonliterary public. Critic Dana Gioia, in his book Can Poetry Matter?, describes Kooser's style as "drawn from common speech, with subject matter common to the Midwest." Kooser's early and contemporary work involves both troubles for Midwesterners, and observations from everyday life. Recurring themes include love, family, place, and time, but he does not consider himself a regional poet.

== Personal life ==
Kooser lives on an acreage near the village of Garland, Nebraska. Kooser has served on the Lincoln Library Board. He was founding president of The Nebraska Literary Heritage Association.

Kooser is married to Kathleen Rutledge, former editor of the Lincoln Journal Star. They have one son and two grandchildren.

== Awards & Honors ==
Title	Year(s)
Two writing fellowships for the National Endowment for the Arts (NEA)	1976 & 1984
Pushcart Prize	1984, 2005, 2009 & 2012
Named United States Poet Laureate Consultant in Poetry	2004 & 2005
Delights & Shadows named as "Best Book of the Year"	2004
Pulitzer Prize for Poetry (Delights & Shadows)	2005
The Best American Essays	2005
University of Nebraska Presidential Professorship	2005, 2006 & 2007
Selected on the three-person jury for Pulitzer Prize for Poetry	2006 & 2011
Dedication of Ted Kooser Elementary School	2009
New York Times Best Illustrated Book, for House Held Up By Trees	2012
Mark Twain Award from The Society for the Study of Midwestern Literature	2013
Independent Publisher's Gold Medal Award for The Wheeling Year	2015

== Bibliography ==
=== Books ===
- Kooser, Ted (1969). Official Entry Blank.
- —— (1971). Grass County.
- —— (1973). Twenty Poems.
- —— (1974). A Local Habitation and a Name.
- —— (1976). Not Coming to Be Barked At.
- —— (1980). Sure Signs: New and Selected Poems.
- —— (1985). One World at a Time.
- —— (1986). The Blizzard Voices.
- —— (1994). Weather Central.
- —— (1995). A Book of Things.
- —— (1999). Riding with Colonel Carter.
- —— (2001). Winter Morning Walks: One Hundred Postcards to Jim Harrison.
- —— (2003). Braided Creek: A Conversation in Poetry. Copper Canyon Press.
- —— (2004). Delights and Shadows. Copper Canyon Press.
- —— (2004). Local Wonders: Seasons in the Bohemian Alps.
- —— (2005). Flying at Night: Poems 1965–1985.
- —— (2005). Lights on a Ground of Darkness: An Evocation of Place and Time.
- —— (2007). The Poetry Home Repair Manual: Practical Advice for Beginning Poets.
- —— (2008). Valentines. University of Nebraska Press.
- —— (2010). Bag in the Wind.
- —— (2012). Pursuing Blackhawk. Cedar Creek Press, Mason City.
- —— (2012). House Held Up by Trees.
- —— (2014). Splitting an Order. Copper Canyon Press.
- —— (2016). The Bell in the Bridge.
- —— (2018). Kindest Regards: New and Selected Poems. Copper Canyon Press.
- —— (2020). Red Stilts. Copper Canyon Press.
- —— (2022). Cotton Candy: Poems Dipped Out of the Air. University of Nebraska Press.
- —— (2024). Raft. Copper Canyon Press.

=== Poems ===
Title	Year	First published	Reprinted/collected	
Carrie	1978	Kooser, Ted (Fall 1978). "Carrie". Prairie Schooner. 52 (4). p. 256.	Kooser, Ted (1980). "Abandoned Farmhouse". "Sure Signs". University of Pittsburgh Press	Kooser, Ted (1980). "Carrie". Sure Signs. University of Pittsburgh Press.
A Birthday Card	1983	Kooser, Ted (November 1983). "A Birthday Card". Poetry. p. 70.		
The Mouse	1983	Kooser, Ted (November 1983). "The Mouse". Poetry. p. 72.		
Lobocraspis Griseifusa	1995	Kooser, Ted (May 1995). "Lobocraspis Griseifusa". Poetry. p. 86.		
New Moon	1995	Kooser, Ted (July 1995). "New Moon". Poetry. p. 86.		
The Early Bird	2003	Kooser, Ted (May 2003). "The Early Bird". Poetry Magazine. p. 75.		
At the Cancer Clinic	2004	Kooser, Ted (May 2004). "At the Cancer Clinic". Delights and Shadows. Copper Canyon Press.	Kooser, Ted (2012). "At the Cancer Clinic". The Writer's Almanac. 2012.	
Father	2004	Kooser, Ted (May 2004). "Father". Delights and Shadows. Copper Canyon Press.	Kooser, Ted (2004). "Father". The Writer's Almanac. 2012.	
Skater	2004	Kooser, Ted (May 2004). "Skater". Delights and Shadows. Copper Canyon Press.	Kooser, Ted (2004). "Skater". Shenandoah. 65 (1).	
Tattoo	2004	Kooser, Ted (June 2003). "Tattoo". Poetry. p. 150.	Kooser, Ted (May 2004). "Tattoo". Delights and Shadows. Copper Canyon Press.	
Flying at Night	2005	Kooser, Ted (January 2005). "Flying at Night". Flying at Night.		
Lantern	2011	Kooser, Ted (Fall 2011). "Lantern". The Kenyon Review. 33 (4).	Kooser, Ted (2013). "Lantern". In Henderson, Bill (ed.). The Pushcart Prize XXXVII : best of the small presses 2013. Pushcart Press. p. 339.	
