= Radical Dads =

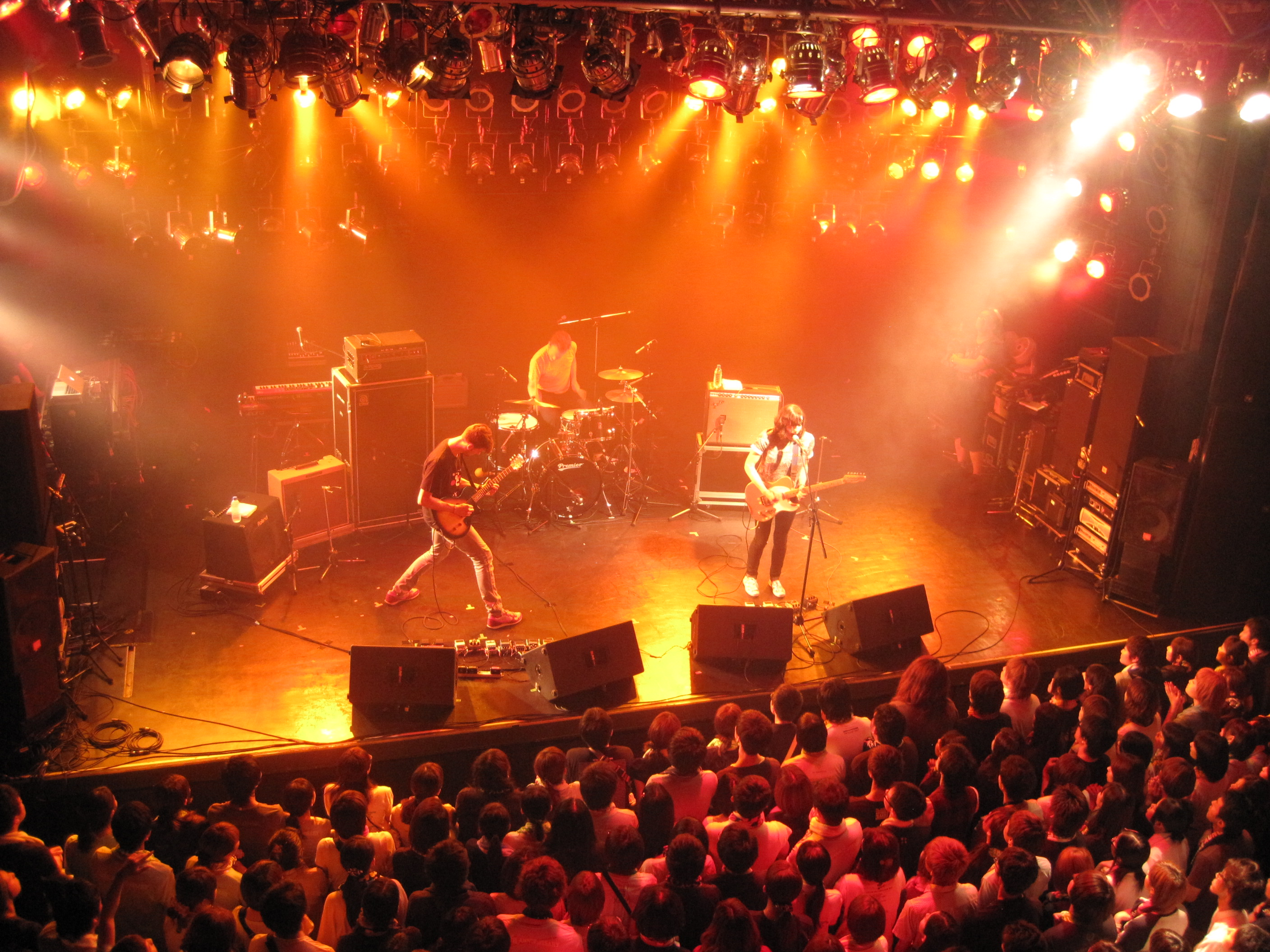

Background information
- Origin: Brooklyn, New York
- Genres: Indie Rock
- Years active: 2011–present
- Labels: Old Flame Records, Uninhabitable Mansions, Loud Baby Sounds, EAU Records
- Members: Lindsay Baker; Chris Diken; Robbie Guertin
- Website: www.radicaldads.com

Radical Dads are an American indie rock band from Brooklyn, New York.

== History ==
Radical Dads released their first full-length album in 2011 titled Mega Rama on CD and digital via record label Uninhabitable Mansions, and later that year also released it on vinyl courtesy of Loud Baby Sounds.

In October 2011, Radical Dads released a 7-inch titled Skateboard Bulldog on Uninhabitable Mansions. Radical Dads released their second full-length album in 2013 on Uninhabitable Mansions titled Rapid Reality.

In November 2015, Radical Dads released a 7-inch on EAU Records titled Creature Out. In February 2015, Radical Dads released their third full-length album on Old Flame Records titled Universal Coolers.

In April 2019, after a four year hiatus, Radical Dads celebrates being 40 years old and still being in a band by releasing a two-song single titled The Face of Loudness on Uninhabitable Mansions.

== Band members ==
- Lindsay Baker (vocals and guitar)
- Chris Diken (guitar)
- Robbie Guertin (drums and vocals)

== Discography ==
- 2010: "Recklessness" 7-inch single (Uninhabitable Mansions)
- 2011: 'Mega Rama" LP (CD: Uninhabitable Mansions, Vinyl: Loud Baby Sounds)
- 2011: "Skateboard Bulldog" 7-inch single (Uninhabitable Mansions)
- 2012: "Torrential Zen" 7-inch split single (Uninhabitable Mansions)
- 2013: 'Rapid Reality" LP (Uninhabitable Mansions)
- 2013: "Creature Out" 7-inch single (EAU Records)
- 2014: "Cassette Brain" Cassette Tape EP (Old Flame Records)
- 2015: "Universal Coolers" LP (Old Flame Records)
- 2019: "The Face of Loudness" two-song single (Uninhabitable Mansions)
- 2020: "Paved Mountain" LP (Uninhabitable Mansions)
