= Being Esther =

2014 novel by Miriam Karmel

- First edition
- Author: Miriam Karmel
- Genre: novel
- Publisher: Milkweed Editions/ (US)
- Publication date: November 11, 2014 (US)
- Pages: 208 (US Edition)
- ISBN: 978-1-57131-105-4

Being Esther (Minneapolis: Milkweed Editions, 2013) is the first novel by Miriam Karmel. It explores the life of an 85-year-old widow, Esther Lustig, who is fully experiencing her days during which she may move from her home. She is currently living alone in a Chicago apartment building, and feels comfortable there, but her over-involved adult daughter wants her to move to an assisted-living facility or "Bingoville".

This novel explores aging and related aspects and maintaining friendships, maintaining boundaries, and maintaining one's choices over one's life.

"Esther has the urge to tell them that growing old is one of the most surprising things that has happened to her," wrote the Twin Cities Daily Planet, calling the novel "a bittersweet joy".

The Star Tribune called Being Esther an accomplished debut that provides illumination into that part of life that is refreshing and positive. Miriam Bradman Abrahams celebrated this clear-eyed vision of Esther's life as "a tale worth telling and reading". Hazel and Wren noted appreciatively Being Esther's authentic voice and its message to "be kinder and more attentive" to those who "have more to share than we think".
