= Holy Cow! Press =

American independent publisher

- Founded: 1977
- Founder: Jim Perlman
- Country of origin: United States
- Headquarters location: Duluth, Minnesota
- Official website: www.holycowpress.org

Holy Cow! Press is an independent publisher based in Duluth, Minnesota. Founded in 1977, they have published more than 135 books.

The press publishes between three and five new books each year, in genres including poetry, fiction, memoir, and biography. Their focus is on writers from the American Midwest, a "territory traditionally ignored by larger indie publishers," according to founder and publisher Jim Perlman, who runs the press out of his home. He also focuses on publishing Native American authors and thematic anthologies.

== Selected publications ==
=== Poetry ===
- Natalie Goldberg (1980), Chicken & In Love
- Joyce Sutphen (2004), Naming the Stars
- Jane Yolen (2011), Things to Say to a Dead Man: Poems at the End of a Marriage and After
- Kimberly Blaeser (2019), Copper Yearning
- Warren Woessner (2019), Exit-Sky
- Richard Terrill (2020), What Falls Away Is Always
- Jane Yolen (2021), Kaddish: Before the Holocaust and After
- Gordon Henry (2022), Spirit Matters: White Clay, Red Exits, Distant Others
- Max Garland (2023), "Into the Good World Again"
- Yael S. Hacohen (2024), "The Dove That Didn't Return"
- Greg Watson (2024), "Stars Unseen"
- Catherine Strisik (2025), "'Goat, Goddess, Moon'"
- Emily Bright (2026), "'This Ground Beneath Our Feet'"
- Joanne Esser (2026), "'Nothing Is Stationary'"

=== Fiction ===
- Miriam Karmel (2017), Subtle Variations and Other Stories

=== Memoir ===
- Brenda Ueland (1996), ME: A Memoir
- Anne-Marie Erickson (2025), "'In the Evening, We'll Dance: A Memoir in Essays on Love & Dementia'"
