= Benjamin Vogt (poet) =

American poet

Benjamin Vogt is an author and garden designer who lives in Nebraska.

He has a PhD in creative writing from the University of Nebraska–Lincoln. He owns Monarch Gardens LLC, a prairie garden design company in eastern Nebraska, and speaks nationally on garden design and landscape ethics at conferences and seminars.

== Bibliography ==
- Prairie Up: An Introduction to Natural Garden Design 3 Fields Books, an imprint of the University of Illinois Press, 2023. ISBN 9780252086779
- A New Garden Ethic: Cultivating Defiant Compassion for an Uncertain Future New Society Publishers. 2017. ISBN 9780865718555
- Afterimage: Poems Stephen F. Austin State University Press. 2012. ISBN 9781936205578
