= Flashy Python =

US musical group

- Origin: Philadelphia, Pennsylvania, United States
- Genre: Indie rock
- Years active: 2005–present
- Label: unsigned
- Members: Alec Ounsworth; Matt Barrick; Toby Leaman; Scott McMicken; Billy Dufala

Flashy Python was a project by Alec Ounsworth of Clap Your Hands Say Yeah. It also featured band members from Dr. Dog, The Walkmen, and Man Man. Their debut album, Skin and Bones, was self-released in 2009.

== History ==
Skin and Bones was released on August 11, 2009, to absolutely no pre-release press. It spontaneously showed up on the Flashy Python official website available for streaming of the entire album and also purchasing details for those who wanted to download the album in high-quality mp3, or buy a physical copy on CD or Vinyl.

== Members ==
- Alec Ounsworth of Clap Your Hands Say Yeah
- Toby Leaman of Dr. Dog
- Scott McMicken of Dr. Dog
- Matt Barrick of The Walkmen
- Billy Dufala of Man Man

Matt Sutton

== Discography ==
=== Albums ===
2009: Skin and Bones
