= Hysterical (album) =

Studio album by Clap Your Hands Say Yeah
- Released: September 20, 2011
- Genre: Indie rock
- Label: Self-released
- Producer: John Congleton

Clap Your Hands Say Yeah chronology
Some Loud Thunder (2007)	Hysterical (2011)	Only Run (2014)

Professional ratings
Aggregate scores
Source	Rating
Metacritic	69/100
Review scores
Source	Rating
AllMusic	3.5/5 stars
The A.V. Club	C
Beats per Minute	62%
Clash	8/10
Consequence of Sound	3.5/5 stars
The Guardian	2/5 stars
The Independent	3/5 stars
NME	7/10
Pitchfork	5.6/10
Rockfreaks.net	7/10 stars
Spin	5/10
Uncut	4/5 stars

Hysterical is the third album by Clap Your Hands Say Yeah. It was released in September 2011.

== History ==
Clap Your Hands Say Yeah's album Hysterical was released on September 12, 2011, in Europe, Japan, and Australia, and September 20 in the United States by Wichita Recordings. The album was produced by John Congleton and features cover art designed by Maya Pindyck. It was the last album to feature long-time backing vocalist Robbie Guertin.

The band released "Same Mistake" and "Maniac" as singles for download from their website. A music video for "Maniac" made by Belgian director Pieter Dirkx was released on September 14, 2011.

== Track listing ==
All lyrics and music written by Alec Ounsworth.

1. "Same Mistake"
2. "Hysterical"
3. "Misspent Youth"
4. "Maniac"
5. "Into Your Alien Arms"
6. "In a Motel"
7. "Yesterday, Never"
8. "Idiot"
9. "Siesta (For Snake)"
10. "Ketamine and Ecstasy"
11. "The Witness' Dull Surprise"
12. "Adam's Plane"
