= Abandoned Farmhouse =

1980 poem by Ted Kooser

"Abandoned Farmhouse" is an American poem in three 8-line stanzas, written by Pulitzer Prize-winning and Poet Laureate, Ted Kooser.

First published in 1980 with Kooser's collection Sure Signs: New and Selected Poems, the poem uses open verse, simple diction and personification of inanimate objects to infer a family's story and possible reasons for their departure, through observation of their abandoned home.

Written almost exclusively in the past tense, The narration personifies and connects inanimate objects observed in and around an empty house. Where the poem itself is primarily inconclusive, its last line shifts the viewpoint from observation, examination, and inference — to present tense rumor.
