= Joyce Sutphen =

American poet (born 1949)

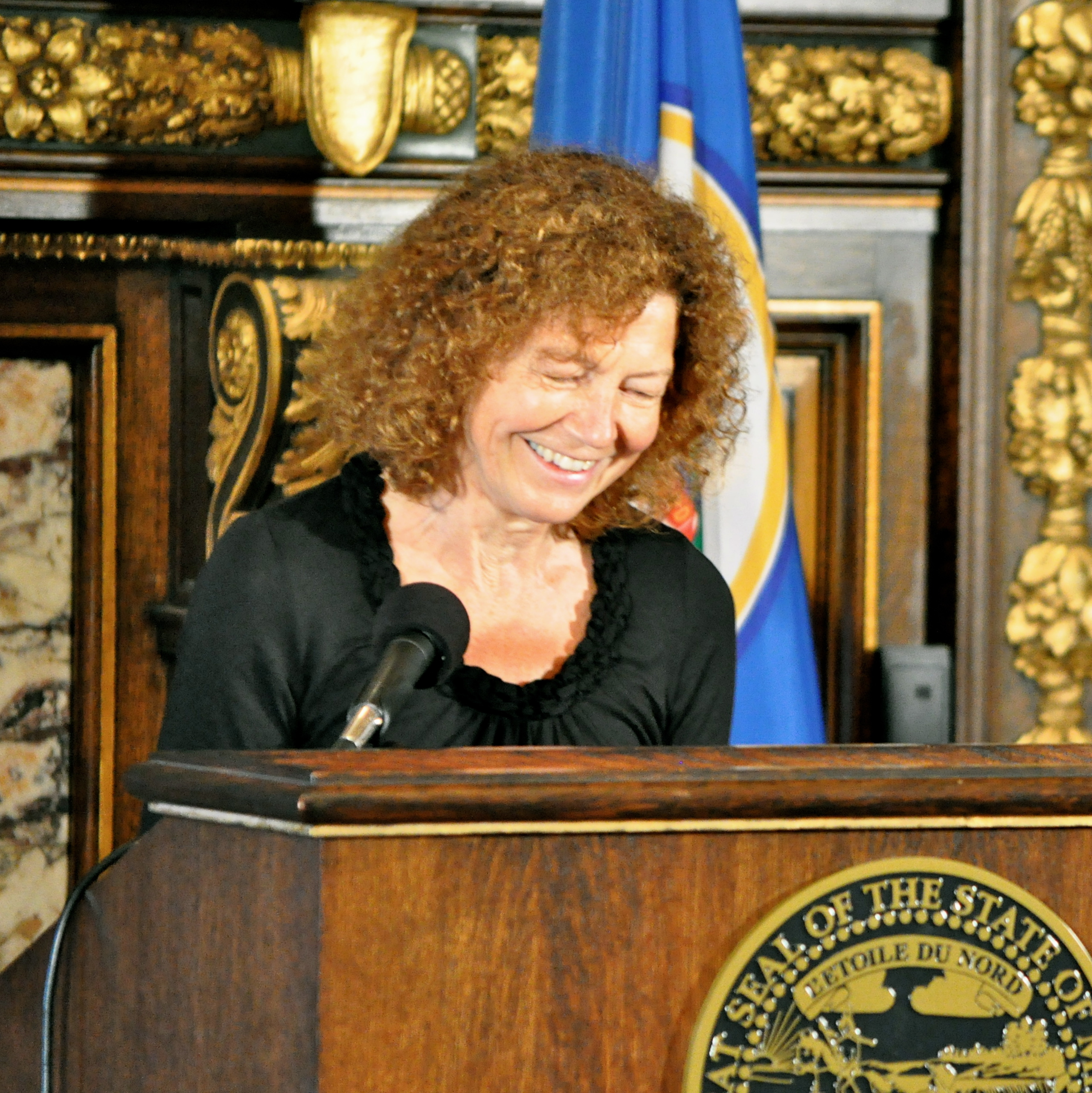
- Sutphen speaking after her appointment as the poet laureate of Minnesota (2011)
- Born: August 10, 1949 (age 77)
- Education: University of Minnesota (PhD)
- Occupation: Poet

Joyce Sutphen (born August 10, 1949) is an American poet who served as Minnesota's Poet Laureate from 2011 to 2021. She was the state's second laureate, appointed by Governor Mark Dayton in August, 2011 to succeed Robert Bly. Sutphen is professor emerita of English at Gustavus Adolphus College in St. Peter, Minnesota.

== Life ==
Sutphen was raised in Saint Joseph, Minnesota, and currently resides in the city of Chaska. She holds degrees from the University of Minnesota, including her Ph.D. in Renaissance Drama.

Her first book of poetry, Straight Out of View (Beacon Press, 1995), won the Barnard New Women's Poets Prize. Her second, Coming Back to the Body (Holy Cow! Press, 2000), was a finalist for a Minnesota Book Award, and her third, Naming the Stars (2004), also from Holy Cow! Press, won the Minnesota Book Award in Poetry.

In 2005, Red Dragonfly Press published a fine press edition of Fourteen Sonnets. Her poems have appeared in American Poetry Review, Poetry, The Gettysburg Review, Water~Stone, Hayden's Ferry, Shenandoah, Luna.

== Prizes ==
- 1994 Barnard Women Poets Prize
- 2005 Minnesota Book Award for Poetry

== Bibliography ==
=== Poetry ===
- Straight Out of View (Beacon Press 1995) ISBN 978-0-8070-6825-0
- Coming Back to the Body (Holy Cow! Press 2000) ISBN 978-0-930100-98-8
- Naming the Stars (Holy Cow! Press 2004) ISBN 978-0-930100-05-6
- First Words (Red Dragonfly Press 2010) ISBN 978-1-890193-91-1
- After Words (Red Dragonfly Press 2013) ISBN 978-1-937693-28-2
- Modern Love & Other Myths (Red Dragonfly Press 2015) ISBN 978-1-937693-68-8
- "The Green House" (Salmon Poetry 2017) ISBN 978-1-910669-61-7
- "Carrying Water to the Field. New and Selected Poems" (University of Nebraska Press 2019) ISBN 978-1-4962-1636-6

=== Chapbooks ===
- Fourteen Sonnets (Red Dragonfly Press 2005)

=== Anthologies ===
- To Sing Along the Way: Minnesota Women Poets from Pre-Territorial Days to the Present, Joyce Sutphen, Connie Wanek, Thom Tammaro, eds. (New Rivers Press 2006) ISBN 978-0-89823-232-5
- 180 More: Extraordinary Poems for Every Day, Billy Collins, ed. (Random House 2005) ISBN 978-0-8129-7296-2
- Boomer Girls: Poems by Women from the Baby Boom Generation, Pamela Gemin and Paula Sergi, eds. (University of Iowa Press 1999) ISBN 978-0-87745-687-2
