= Miriam Karmel =

American novelist and writer

- Born: Chicago, Illinois, U.S.
- Education: University of Wisconsin-Madison (History); University of Rochester (Master's, American labor History); University of North Carolina at Chapel Hill (Master's, Journalism)
- Period: 21st century
- Genre: Novel, Short story
- Notable works: Being Esther (2013), Subtle Variations and Other Stories (2017)
- Notable awards: Minnesota Monthly's 2002 Tamarack Award, Kate Braverman Short Story Prize, Arthur Edelstein Prize for Short Fiction

Miriam Karmel is an American writer. Her first novel, Being Esther (2013), is one of only a few involving characters in their eighties.

Karmel's writing has appeared in numerous publications including Bellevue Literary Review, The Talking Stick, Pearl, Dust & Fire, Passager Books, Jewish Women's Literary Annual, and Water~Stone Review. She is the recipient of Minnesota Monthly's 2002 Tamarack Award, the Kate Braverman Short Story Prize, and the Arthur Edelstein Prize for Short Fiction. Her story Subtle Variations was anthologized in Milkweed Editions' Fiction on a Stick.

== Life ==
Karmel was born in Chicago, Illinois. She earned a degree in history at the University of Wisconsin-Madison, a master's in American labor history from the University of Rochester, and a master's in journalism from University of North Carolina at Chapel Hill that launched her journalism career. She moved to Minnesota in 1978. Her primary focus is on short stories, but she has also written a novel and has other work published as well.

=== Being Esther ===
Karmel's first novel Being Esther was published in 2013 by Milkweed Editions. It concerns an 85-year-old widow, Esther Lustig, who suddenly finds herself elderly and in the midst of a pushed-transition to an assisted-living facility she refers to as 'Bingoville'. The novel moves in and out of time, and suggests looking more closely at those who 'have more to share than we think.'

=== Short fiction ===
In 2009 Karmel's short story Happy Chicken won the Carol Bly Short Story Contest, sponsored by Writers Rising Up, an Eden Prairie, Minnesota-based environmental nonprofit.

In 2017 Miriam Karmel's collection Subtle Variations and Other Stories (October, 2017) won the inaugural Holy Cow! Press First Fiction Award, and a $5,000 cash prize. Karmel's submission was one of 65 manuscripts from around the region. Anthony Bukoski praises Kamel for locating the universal in the details of everyday life, but states a difficulty in some cases of sorting out family relationships.
