= New Fragility =

Studio album by Clap Your Hands Say Yeah
- Released: February 12, 2021
- Studios: Ramble Creek Studios; Silent Partner Studios
- Genre: Indie rock
- Length: 40:56
- Labels: Self-released; Secretly Canadian
- Producer: Alec Ounsworth

Clap Your Hands Say Yeah chronology
The Tourist (2017)	New Fragility (2021)

Singles from New Fragility
- 1. "Hesitating Nation" Released: October 14, 2020; 2. "Thousand Oaks" Released: October 14, 2020; 3. "Where They Perform Miracles" Released: December 18, 2020

Professional ratings
Aggregate scores
Source	Rating
AnyDecentMusic?	6.9/10
Metacritic	72/100
Review scores
Source	Rating
AllMusic	4/5 stars
DIY	2.5/5 stars
The Irish Times	3/5 stars
The Line of Best Fit	6/10
MusicOMH	4/5 stars
Paste	7.7/10
Pitchfork	6.4/10

New Fragility is the sixth studio album by American indie rock band Clap Your Hands Say Yeah. The album was self-released on February 12, 2021.

== Release ==
On October 14, 2020, lead vocalist Alec Ounsworth announced the release of the sixth studio album, along with two singles "Hesitating Nation" and "Thousand Oaks". In a press release, Ounsworth explained the meaning of "Thousand Oaks": "In 2018, there was a shooting in Thousand Oaks, CA which killed 13 people. This song has to do with the impotence of the American government in the face of such tragedies."

The third single "Where They Perform Miracles" was released on December 18, 2020.

== Critical reception ==
New Fragility was met with "generally favorable" reviews from critics. At Metacritic, which assigns a weighted average rating out of 100 to reviews from mainstream publications, this release received an average score of 72 based on 9 reviews. At AnyDecentMusic?, the release was given a 6.9 out of 10 based on 10 reviews.

Matt Collar of AllMusic gave the release four stars out of five, explaining "Recorded and produced by Ounsworth in Austin, Texas with some additional production by Will Johnson, New Fragility is a poetic, deeply personal album that finds Ounsworth searching for an ever-deeper sense of meaning in what often feels like an increasingly tumultuous and fragile world." Reviewing the album for DIY, Chris Hamilton-Peach was heavily critical, noting: "New Fragility strives for structure, toggling between social awareness and slack harmonies in an interplay that never fully attains the unity it craves. Winding orchestral flights propel Innocent Weight, in part redeeming an effort that covers little in the way of new ground, while timely lyrical takes command attention yet lack the frequency to shake off neighbouring songs sinking under their own unwieldy mass. Ian Cohen of Pitchfork wrote: "Alec Ounsworth's latest album is a world of divorce, substance abuse, callous indifference to murder, and also bittersweet nostalgia for that bygone indie-rock era that gave him a platform in the first place."

== Track listing ==
New Fragility track listing
No.	Title	Writer(s)	Length
1.	"Hesitating Nation"	Alec Ounsworth	3:13
2.	"Thousand Oaks"	Alec Ounsworth	4:47
3.	"Dee, Forgiven"	Alec Ounsworth	4:08
4.	"New Fragility"	Alec Ounsworth	3:38
5.	"Innocent Weight"	Alec Ounsworth	3:58
6.	"Mirror Song"	Alec Ounsworth	4:32
7.	"CYHSY, 2005"	Alec Ounsworth	3:35
8.	"Where They Perform Miracles"	Alec Ounsworth	3:52
9.	"Went Looking for Trouble"	Alec Ounsworth	5:46
10.	"If I Were More Like Jesus"	Alec Ounsworth	3:27
Total length:			40:56

== Personnel ==
Credits adapted from AllMusic.

Musicians

- Alec Ounsworth – vocals, bass, guitar, piano
- Will Johnson – drums, guitar
- Jonas Oesterle – drums
- Jaron Olevsky – drums
- Britton Beisenherz – bass
- Carolina Diazgronados – cello
- Veronica Jurkiewicz – viola
- Carlos Santiago – violin
- Gabriel Miller – violin

Technical

- Alec Ounsworth – engineer, producer
- Greg Calbi – mastering
- Will Johnson – producer
- Matthew Poirier – engineer
- Britton Beisenherz – engineer
- Brendan Cooney – string arrangement
- John Agnello − mixing

Production

- Claire Kimock – design
- Beth Ounsworth – cover art
