= Skin and Bones (Flashy Python album) =

Studio album by Flashy Python
- Released: August 11, 2009
- Recorded: 2009, Conshohocken, Pennsylvania
- Genre: Rock
- Length: 41:17
- Label: Self-released
- Producer: Alec Ounsworth

Professional ratings
Review scores
Source	Rating
Pitchfork Media	(6.5/10)
Strangeglue	(6/10)

Skin and Bones is the debut album by Flashy Python. It appeared without any pre-release press on the band's official website, from where it is available for streaming, high-quality mp3 download, and purchase in physical form on CD or Vinyl.

== Track listing ==
All tracks written by Alec Ounsworth.

1. "Let Us Hallucinate Together" - 3:21
2. "The Lady is a Ghost" - 5:31
3. "Ichiban Blues" - 3:30
4. "Skin and Bones" - 4:31
5. "Obscene Queen Bee" - 4:33
6. "In the Darkness" - 4:53
7. "Cattle's New Clothes" - 3:47
8. "Avalon's Snake Breath" - 11:12
9. "King Sutt" - 1:21 (Japanese edition bonus track)
10. "Me and the Wife" - 4:01 (Japanese edition bonus track, alternate version of 'That is Not My Home (After Bruegel)' from Mo Beauty)
11. "All and All" - 5:03 (Japanese edition bonus track)

== Personnel ==
- Alec Ounsworth - Vocals, Hammond Organ, Wurlitzer, Bass Guitar, Piano, Guitar, Percussion, Gong, Mud Guitar, Air Organs, Throat Tom, Accordion, Harmonica, 12-string Guitar, Farfisa, Acoustic Guitar, Mud Vocals, Motu Strings (Violin, Cello, Contrabass)
- Scott McMicken - Guitar, Piano, Drums, Hammond Organ, Percussion, Bass Guitar, Wurlitzer
- Matt Sutton - Baritone Guitar, Pedal-steel Guitar, Acoustic Baritone Guitar
- Quentin Stoltzfus – Bongos, Drums, Guitar
- Mickey Walker – Bass Guitar, Farifsa
- Matt Barrick - Drums
- Toby Leaman - Bass guitar
- Billy Dufala - Saxophone
- David Cope – Piano
- Tyler Sargent - Bass Guitar
- Emily Ounsworth - Trumpet
