= Robert Lacey (disambiguation) =

Robert Lacey (born 1944) is a British historian.

Robert Lacey may also refer to:

- Robert C. Lacey (1886–1943), American businessman and politician from New York
- Bert Lacey (Robert Herbert Lacey, 1900–1984), Australian politician
- Bob Lacey (born 1953), baseball pitcher
- Bob Lacey (American football) (1942–1997), American football wide receiver
- Bob Lacey of The Bob and Sheri Show
- Rob Lacey (1962–2006), British actor and author

== See also ==
- Robert De Lacey (1892–1976), American film director
- Robert Lacey Everett (1833–1916), English farmer and politician
- Robert Lacy (disambiguation)
