= Dasha Shishkin =

Russian artist (born 1977)

Dasha Shishkin (born 1977) is an artist who works in acrylic, gouache, pastel, conté crayon, graphite, and ink, and produces prints by etching. Shishkin's drawings are often painted on both sides of the transparent polyester film known as mylar. Most of her prints are sold through Griffelkunst in Hamburg, a democratic printshop founded in 1935 that distributes select prints to subscription members under the condition they cannot be resold, only given away or inherited.

Shishkin was born in Moscow, Russia in 1977, and immigrated to New York City as a teenager. She studied at the Parsons School of Design, where she produced her first set of prints from 2001 to 2002, The 400 Series, nine etchings so named for the number of minutes she allowed herself to prepare each drawing. One of her drawings from this period was used for Clap Your Hands Say Yeah's 2005 debut album cover. Shishkin earned a master of fine arts degree from Columbia University in 2006, and lives in New York City.
