= Only Run =

Studio album by Clap Your Hands Say Yeah
- Released: June 3, 2014
- Genre: Indie rock
- Label: Self-released

Clap Your Hands Say Yeah chronology
Hysterical (2011)	Only Run (2014)	The Tourist (2017)

Professional ratings
Aggregate scores
Source	Rating
Metacritic	64/100
Review scores
Source	Rating
Pitchfork	5.8/10
Rolling Stone	3/5
Spin	7/10

Only Run is the fourth album by American musical project Clap Your Hands Say Yeah, self-released on June 3, 2014.

== Track listing ==
1. "As Always"
2. "Blameless"
3. "Coming Down" (featuring Matt Berninger)
4. "Little Moments"
5. "Only Run"
6. "Your Advice"
7. "Beyond Illusion"
8. "Impossible Request"
9. "Cover Up" (featuring Kid Koala)

Bonus track

10. "Impossible Request" (alt. version; available via download code)
