= Some Loud Thunder =

Studio album by Clap Your Hands Say Yeah
- Released: January 29, 2007
- Genre: Indie rock
- Length: 45:15
- Label: self-released (US); Wichita (UK); V2 (UK)
- Producer: Dave Fridmann

Clap Your Hands Say Yeah chronology
Clap Your Hands Say Yeah (2005)	Some Loud Thunder (2007)	Hysterical (2011)

Singles from Clap Your Hands Say Yeah
- 1. "Satan Said Dance" Released: February 19, 2007

Professional ratings
Aggregate scores
Source	Rating
Metacritic	63/100
Review scores
Source	Rating
AllMusic	3.5/5 stars
The A.V. Club	B−
Entertainment Weekly	B−
MSN Music (Consumer Guide)	A−
Pitchfork	7.2/10
Rolling Stone	3/5 stars
The Skinny	4/5 stars
Spin	7/10
Stylus	B−
Tiny Mix Tapes	2.5/5 stars

Some Loud Thunder is the second studio album by American musical project Clap Your Hands Say Yeah. It was released on January 29, 2007, in the United Kingdom, and the next day in the United States by Wichita Recordings; but people who pre-ordered the album were able to legally download it from Insound starting January 16. The album was produced by Dave Fridmann, known for his work with Mercury Rev and The Flaming Lips.

The album debuted at #47 on the Billboard 200 album chart with 19,000 copies sold. "Satan Said Dance" was ranked the 95th best song of 2007 by Rolling Stone.

== Track listing ==
All tracks written by Alec Ounsworth, except where noted.

1. "Some Loud Thunder"
2. "Emily Jean Stock"
3. "Mama, Won't You Keep Them Castles in the Air and Burning?"
4. "Love Song No. 7"
5. "Satan Said Dance"
6. "Upon Encountering the Crippled Elephant"
7. "Goodbye to Mother and the Cove" (Ounsworth, Tyler Sargent, Sean Greenhalgh)
8. "Arm and Hammer"
9. "Yankee Go Home"
10. "Underwater (You and Me)"
11. "Five Easy Pieces"
12. "The Sword Song" (Japanese release and iTunes bonus track)
