= Frederick Henry Sykes =

Frederick Henry Sykes (October 21, 1863 – October 14, 1917) was an American college president, born in Queensville, Canada West. He graduated from the University of Toronto in 1885, studied at Johns Hopkins University (1891–95), and afterwards held various teaching positions. From 1903 to 1910 he was professor of English literature and director of extension teaching at Columbia University, then professor of English at Teachers College, Columbia (1910–13). He became the first president of the Connecticut College for Women (1913–17). His publications include:

- French Elements in Middle English (1899)
- Syllabus of a Course of Six Lectures on the Modern English Novel (1901)
- Syllabus of Lectures on Shakespeare (1903)
- Lectures on the History of English Literature in the Nineteenth Century (1904)
- Schools of the Art Industries: A Plea for a New Type of School in the Public School System (1912)
- He wrote several books on English composition, edited various English texts, and was general editor of Scribner's "English Classics Series."
