= Roxanne Johnson =

American chemist

- Education: Connecticut College (BA); University of Rhode Island (MS)
- Scientific career
- Fields: Chemistry
- Workplaces: United States Environmental Protection Agency

Roxanne L. Johnson is an American chemist specialized in developing and applying quantitative methods to determine nutrients, organic and inorganic carbon and total suspended solids in estuarine seawater systems. She works for the United States Environmental Protection Agency.

== Education ==
Johnson completed a B.A. in chemical science at Connecticut College in 1965. In 1997, she earned a M.S. in statistics at the University of Rhode Island (URI).

== Career and research ==
From 1978 to 1982, Johnson was a research assistant in the URI biochemistry department. She was a marine research specialist at URI working for the United States Environmental Protection Agency (EPA) from 1982 to 1988. She worked as an associate chemist for the Science Applications International Corporation on contract with the EPA from 1988 to 1995. In 1995, Johnson joined the Atlantic Ecology Division of the EPA's National Health and Environmental Effects Research Laboratory.

Johnson develops and applies quantitative methods to determine nutrients, organic and inorganic carbon and total suspended solids in estuarine seawater systems. She has developed and applied experimental designs and statistical analyses, using Primer and SAS, to the study of benthic communities as indicators of estuarine health in several New England estuarine systems.
