= William Lychack =

American novelist

Signature
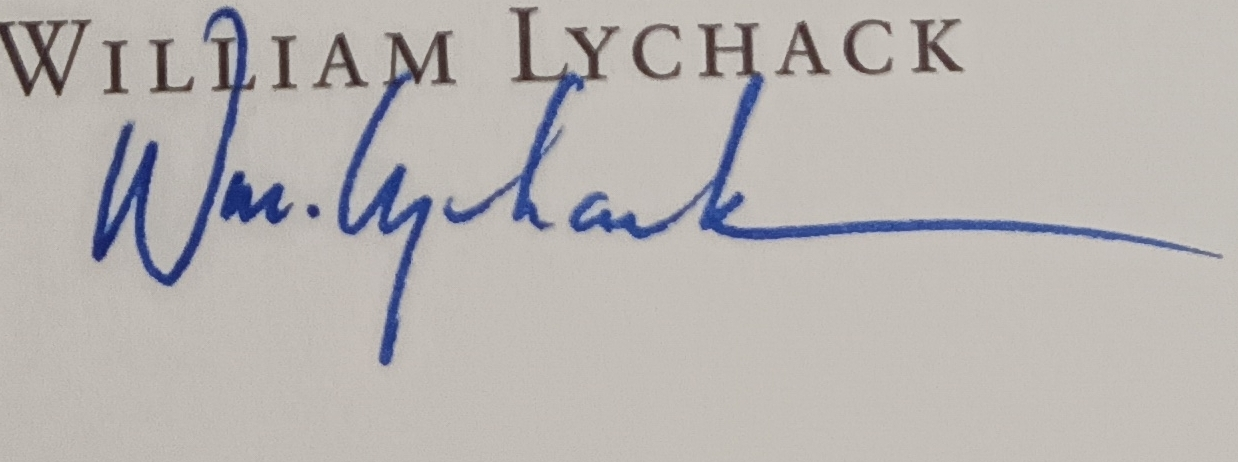

William Lychack (born c. 1966) is the author of two novels, The Wasp Eater and Cargill Falls, along with a short story collection The Architect of Flowers, and other works. His writings have appeared in Conjunctions, Ploughshares, The Southern Review, The American Scholar, Story Magazine, and elsewhere, including The Best American Short Stories, The Pushcart Prize, and on the public radio program This American Life.

== Life ==
Lychack was born around 1966. Lychack has described himself as being estranged from his father, who he only met twice in his life and died when Lychack was 10 years old.

Lychack was the first person in his family to graduate high school. He attended Connecticut College, where, as a sophomore, he took a writing course with Blanche McCrary Boyd. Boyd brought in a number of writers to speak to the students including William Styron, Norman Mailer, Francine du Plessix Gray, Renata Adler, Alexander Cockburn, Joe McGinniss, and Barbara Grizzuti Harrison. Lychack later said, "I imprinted on those big ducks pretty deeply. They were my first permission givers. Theirs were those early books that I worshipped and dog-eared and wanted to emulate. To some degree, they still are."

After graduating college in 1988, Lychack attended the University of Michigan, where he earned an M.F.A. in 1991.

== Writing career ==
Lychack has received a National Endowment for the Arts Fellowship, a Christopher Isherwood Foundation Award, a Sherwood Anderson Award, a Pittsburgh Foundation Grant, and has been a Barnes and Noble Discover Great New Writers Selection. He has worked as an editor at New England Review and Guideposts Magazine, and he has also taught at the University of Michigan, the University of Minnesota, Connecticut College, and Lesley University. From 2006 to 2010 he was the Charles Murray Writer-in-Residence at Phillips Academy. He is currently an associate professor in The Writing Program at University of Pittsburgh.

== Critical response ==
Lychack has been called an experimental writer who uses autobiographical material in his work.

The New York Times described The Wasp Eater as a "spare, meticulous novel (that) opens out like a poem, its deceptively casual images bearing a universe of weight."

== Bibliography ==
=== Novels ===
- Cargill Falls (Braddock Avenue Books, 2020)
- The Wasp Eater (Houghton Mifflin Harcourt, 2004)

=== Short story collections ===
- The Architect of Flowers (Harper Perennial, 2011)

=== Selected Short Fiction ===
- "Cargill Falls," Story Magazine
- "Brownie Versus Mouse," Washington Square Review
- "Fidelity," The New Ohio Review
- "Griswald," The Sun Magazine

=== Selected Nonfiction ===
- Cement and the Foundations of a Company: The Holnam Cement Plants, Their Histories, and People (Holnam, 1997)
- "The Lady and the Monk," The American Scholar
- "In Memory of a Mentor," NPR
- "Notes Toward a Greater Unbalancing," The Southern Review
