= Benjamin Vogt (footballer) =

Liechtenstein footballer

Personal information
- Date of birth: 28 June 1999 (age 27)
- Place of birth: Liechtenstein
- Position: Left-back

Team information
- Current team: Balzers
- Number: 13

Youth career
- –2016: Balzers

Senior career*
Years	Team	Apps	(Gls)
2016–2018	Balzers	2	(0)
2018–2020	Vaduz II		
2020–	Balzers	5	(0)

International career^{‡}
2016–2017	Liechtenstein U19	6	(0)
2017–2020	Liechtenstein U21	14	(0)
2021	Liechtenstein	1	(0)
- * Club domestic league appearances and goals as of 18:58, 31 May 2025 (UTC) ‡ National team caps and goals as of 20:32, 28 March 2021 (UTC)

Benjamin Vogt (born 28 June 1999) is a Liechtensteiner footballer who plays as a left-back for Balzers and the Liechtenstein national team.

== Career ==
Vogt made his international debut for Liechtenstein on 28 March 2021 in a 2022 FIFA World Cup qualification match against North Macedonia.

== Career statistics ==
=== International ===
As of 28 March 2021

Liechtenstein
Year	Apps	Goals
2021	1	0
Total	1	0
