= Washboard Chaz =

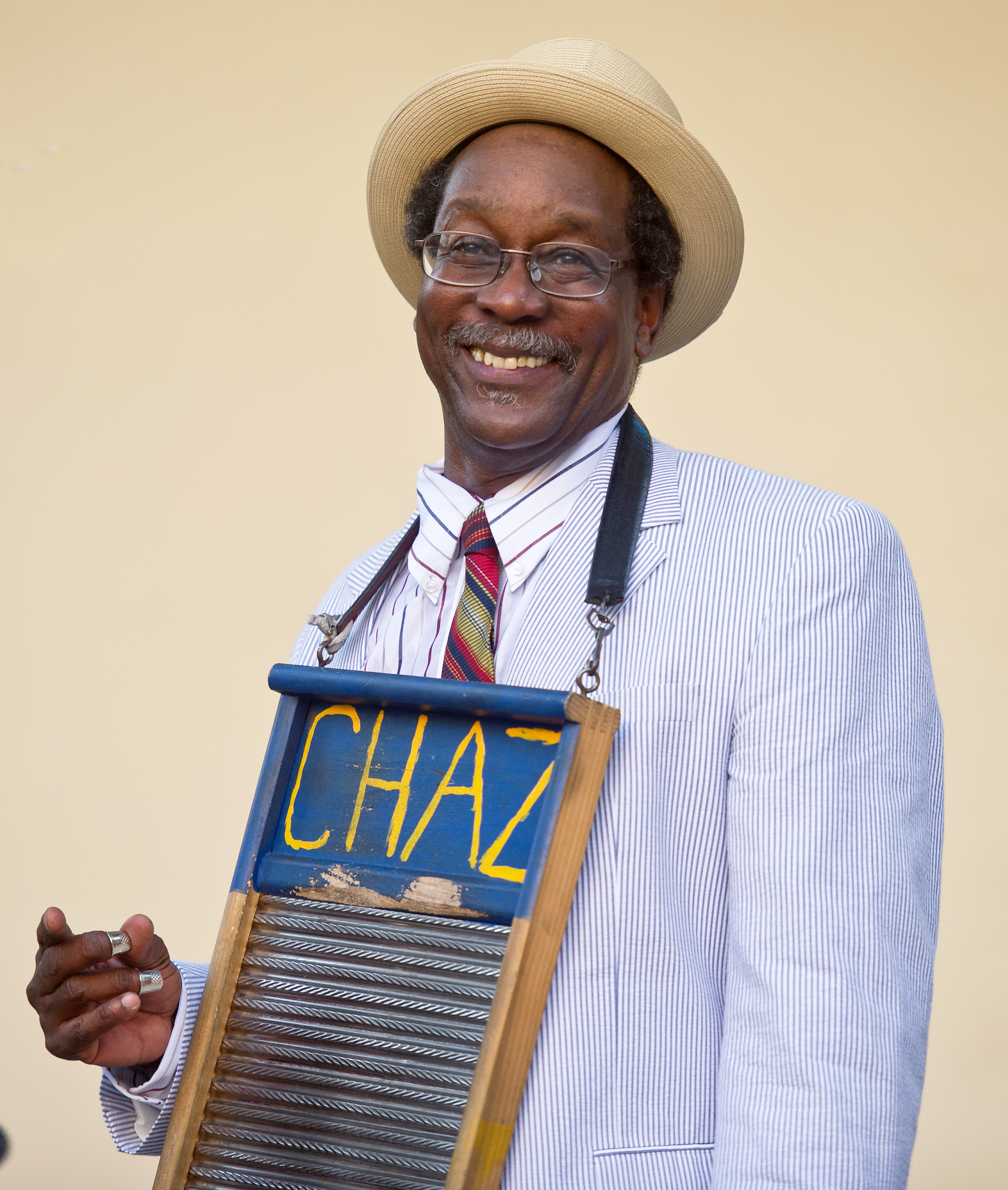
- Washboard Chaz (2011, Lincoln Center, NYC)

Background information
- Born: Charles Leary; Brooklyn, New York, U.S.
- Origin: New Orleans, Louisiana, U.S.
- Genres: Blues, jazz, Western swing
- Occupations: Musician, singer-songwriter
- Instruments: Washboard, vocals
- Years active: 1970s–present

Washboard Chaz (born Charles Leary) is an American acoustic blues and washboard player based in New Orleans, Louisiana. He is known for performing with several New Orleans-based traditional jazz and blues ensembles, including the Washboard Chaz Blues Trio, Tin Men, Washboard Rodeo, and Palmetto Bug Stompers. Chaz has performed and recorded regularly since the 1980s.

== Early life and Colorado ==
Charles Leary was born in 1949 in Brooklyn, New York, and became interested in music as a youth after watching "jazz musicians strut out the door in their fancy suits", following poker games at local roadhouses. He began playing the washboard after picking up the instrument in Key West in the early 1970s, later customizing it with two tin cans, a wood block, and a hotel bell. His washboard is on exhibit at the New Orleans Jazz Museum at the New Orleans Mint.

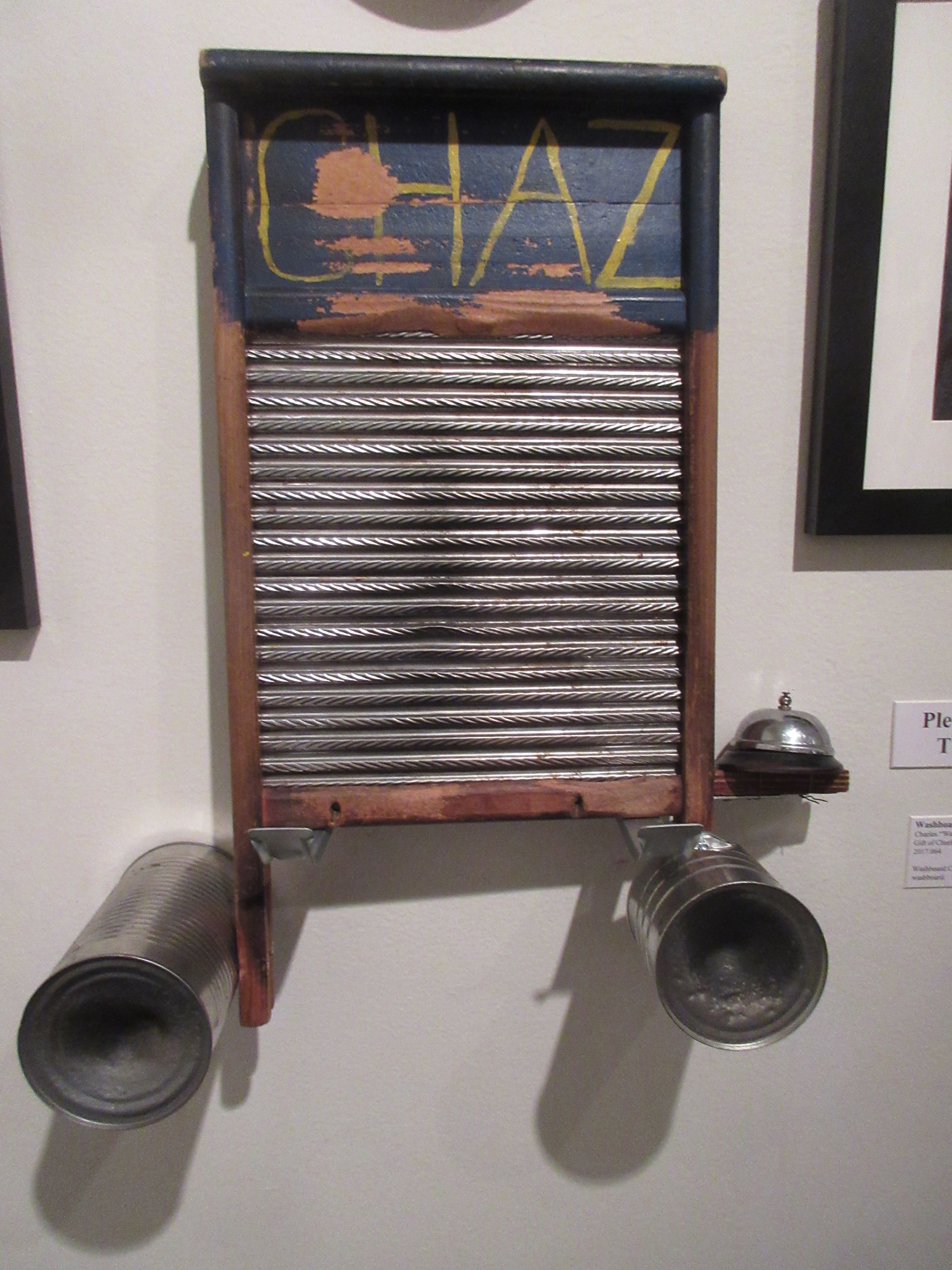
Chaz's Washboard on Exhibit at New Orleans Jazz Museum

Chaz moved to Boulder, Colorado in 1975, where he played with local bands including the Ophelia Swing Band, Prosperity Jazz Band, Judy Roderick and the Forebears, BBQ Bob & Washboard Chaz, and Bleecker Street.

Chaz resided in and was mayor of Gold Hill, Colorado, where he often played at the Gold Hill Inn, a hotel and restaurant founded in 1872, which hosts weekly music and has hosted popular blue grass bands including Peter Rowan and John Hartford and the founders of Leftover Salmon.

After briefly living in Kansas City, Chaz settled in New Orleans in 2000 and began performing regularly with the city's local music scene, including sitting in on Jackson Square with other local musicians including jazz tubist Anthony Lacen a.k.a. Tuba Fats.

== New Orleans ==
After moving to New Orleans, Chaz formed the Washboard Chaz Blues Trio in 2001, performing Piedmont finger-style, Delta, and Chicago blues. Their discography includes Courtyard Blues (2002), Dog Days (2004), Hard Year Blues (2006), and Live at the Spotted Cat (2015).

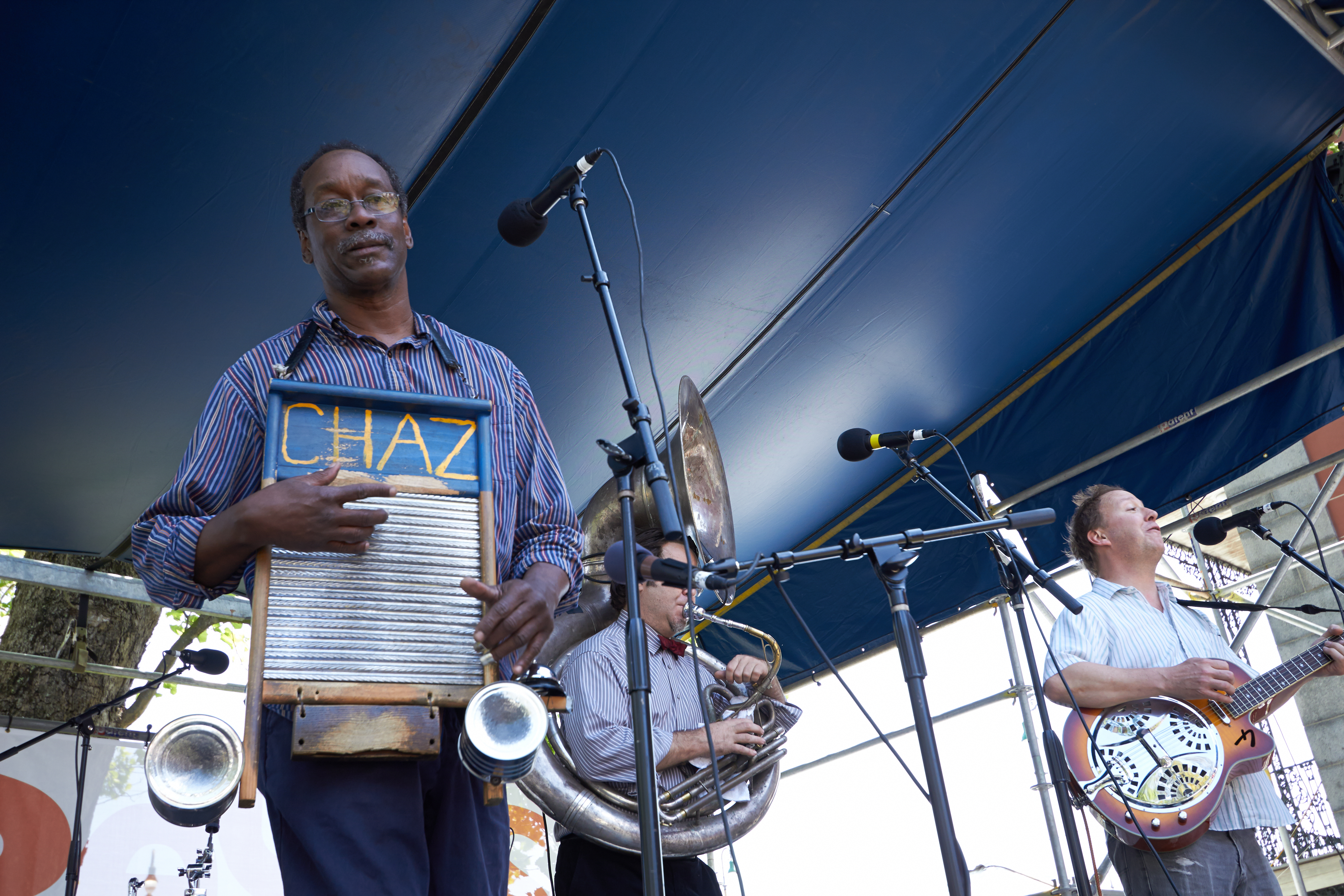
The Tin Men at French Quarter Fest 2013

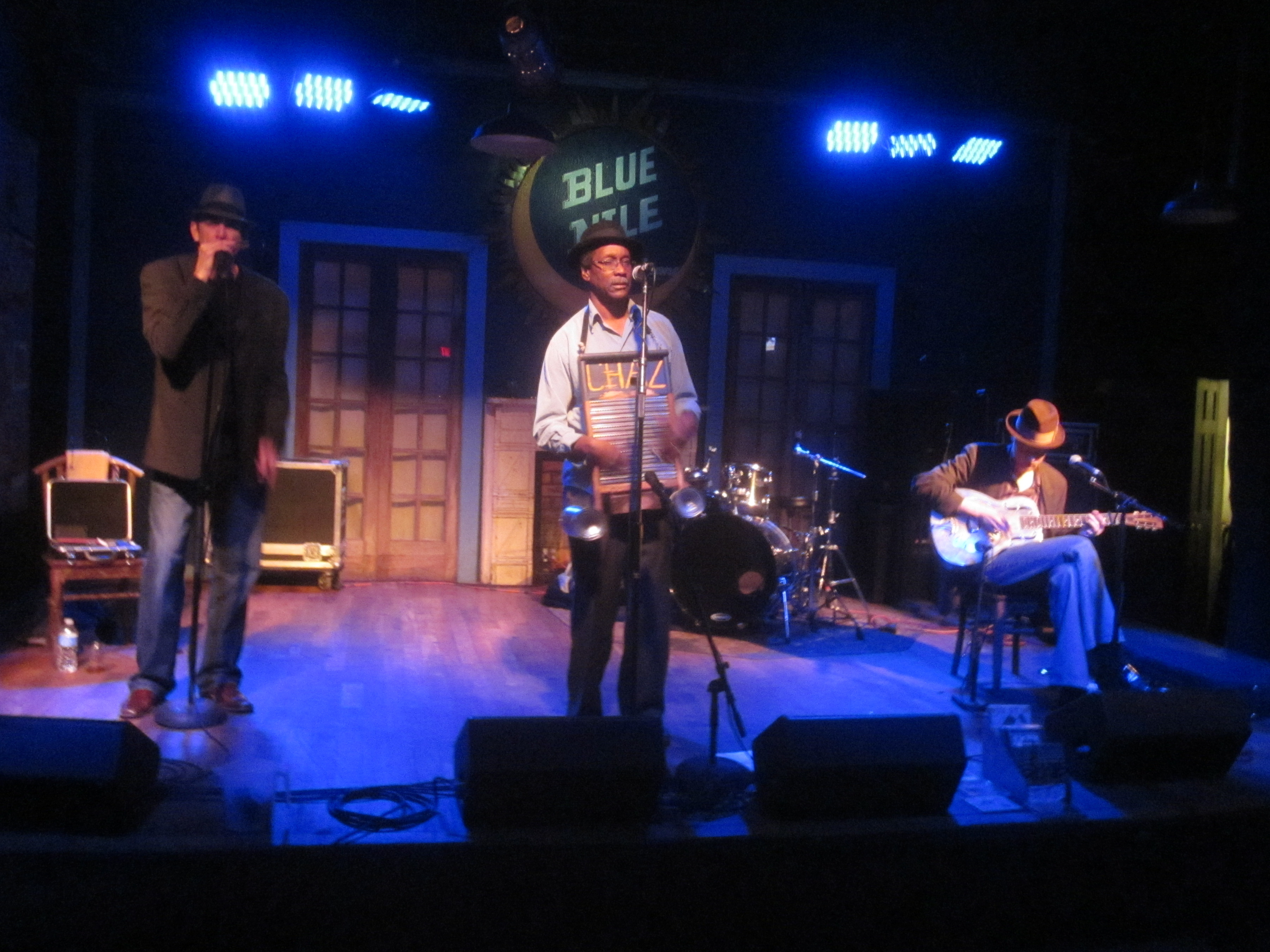
Washboard Chaz Blues Trio at Blue Nile

In 2002, he joined guitarist and vocalist Alex McMurray and sousaphonist Matt Perrine, former members of Royal Fingerbowl, to create The Tin Men. Their discography includes “Super Great Music For Modern Lovers” (2003), “Freaks for Industry!” (2005), “Avocado Woo Woo” (2013), "On the Shady Side" (2015), “Sing With Me” (2018), and “Hit It!” (2023). The Tin Men received positive reviews from RollingStone following their 2018 Jazz Fest performance as one of “The Seven Best Things We Saw” including Chaz’s rendition of Herbie Hancock’s “Rockit” and McMurray’s “witty” songwriting.

Chaz formed Washboard Rodeo in late 2005 to focus on Western swing, a genre he was introduced to while living in Colorado. Inspired by 1930s musicians Bob Wills & his Texas Playboys, and Milton Brown & his Musical Brownies, Chaz and other local musicians began rehearsing in 2006. Hurricane Katrina displaced the band, but they reconnected following the storm and released their first CD in 2010.

Chaz also formed the Palmetto Bug Stompers in the mid-2000s, a traditional New Orleans Jazz and Blues ensemble, featuring Robert Snow on acoustic bass, John Rodli on guitar and vocals, Will Smith on trumpet and vocals, Paul Robertson on trombone, Bruce Brackman on clarinet, and Washboard Chaz on washboard and vocals. Their discography includes Palmetto Bug Stompers (2003), “Ol’ New Orleans Home” (2006), Live @ D.B.A. (2009), Sugar Blues (2016), Stomping Our Way Into Your Hearts (2019).

In April 2026, Chaz was featured on the cover of Living Blues magazine (issue 302), in a career retrospective by music journalist Robert H. Cataliotti titled "Washboard Chaz Leary: It's Just Rhythm on the Wing."

== Festivals and appearances ==
In the late '70s, Chaz played at multiple Telluride Bluegrass Festivals with the Opelia Swing Band, spanning 1975-1778, and built lasting friendships with Sam Bush, Emmy Lou Harris, and Bela Fleck.

In 2006, Alex McMurray and his wife, Kourtney Keller, established Chaz Fest, a local music festival named as a play on “Jazz Fest” and the name “Chaz" in New Orleans’ Bywater neighborhood. The event was scheduled for Thursday between the two weekends of the New Orleans Jazz & Heritage Festival and featured performances by local musicians. Washboard Chaz played one song with each band throughout the day. The Festival ended in 2016 as the festival location was sold. The festival was named Best Neighborhood Festival by Offbeat in 2011, and returned at a new location in 2019 and 2024 including Washboard Rodeo among other local bands. In 2022, the Gold Hill Inn, hosted Chaz Fest West, a two day festival that featured Chaz and other local colorado musicians.

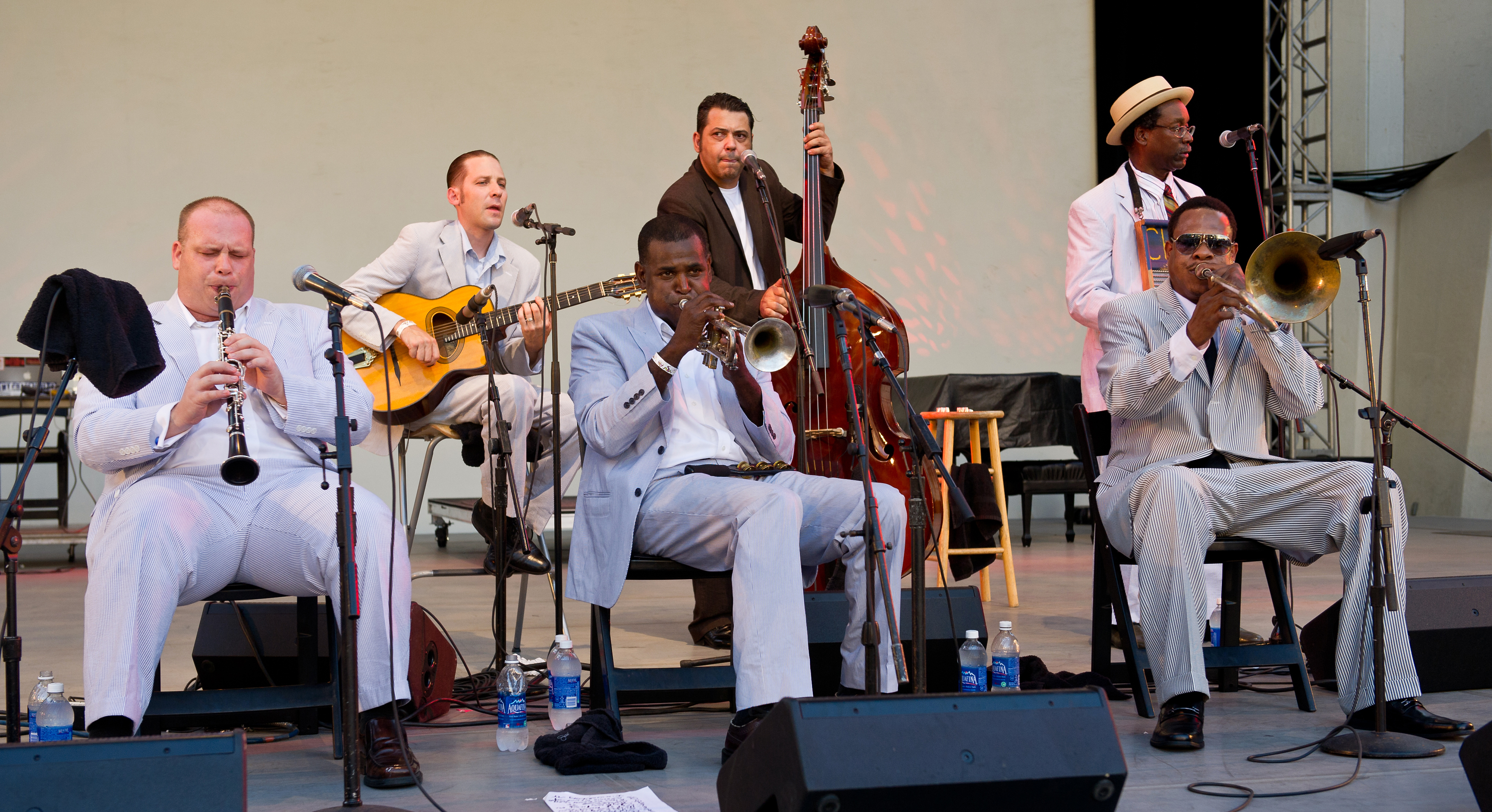
The Palmetto Bug Stompers in performance at Lincoln Center, NYC (July 12 2011)

Chaz's New Orleans bands have performed annually at French Quarter Festival, New Orleans Jazz & Heritage Festival, and New Olreans Crescent City Blues & BBQ Festival.

== Collaborations and appearances ==
Washboard Chaz has performed or recorded with artists including Bonnie Raitt, Taj Mahal, John P. Hammond, Anders Osborne, Robert Cray, and Doc Watson. He appears on over 70 recordings, including John P. Hammond's Grammy-nominated Long as I Have You (1998) CD.

Chaz has made television appearances on HBO's Treme (TV Series), NCIS: New Orleans, and in Werner Herzog's Bad Lieutenant: Port of Call New Orleans.

Chaz was included in Playing For Change's "Stand by Me" video project, along with Keith Richards, Keb' Mo' and other global musicians in Ben E. King's "Stand by Me" and the Rolling Stones' "Gimme Shelter" song. In 2025, Chaz rejoined Playing for Change for a special release of the WAR song "Why Can't We Be Friends?" in honor of the 50th anniversary, featuring current and original remaining members of WAR plus over 30 global musicians. Chaz was introduced to the Playing for Change team by Roberto Luti, an Italian slide guitarist who was a member of Chaz's Blues Trio.

== Instruction and teaching ==
Chaz is a faculty member of the Centrum (arts organization) Acoustic Blues workshop in Port Townsend, Washington, where he teaches percussion and blues.
