= Lee Sargent =

- Origin: Hingham, Massachusetts, U.S.
- Genres: Indie rock
- Formerly of: Clap Your Hands Say Yeah

Lee Sargent is the former guitarist/backup vocalist for the indie rock band Clap Your Hands Say Yeah.

He attended college at Connecticut College along with the other members of Clap Your Hands Say Yeah. He is also the twin brother of CYHSY bassist Tyler Sargent.

In 2008, Sargent performed on James Lavino's score to the Alex Karpovsky film "Woodpecker." The soundtrack also featured performances by Sargent's brother Tyler and by Radiohead bass player Colin Greenwood.
