= Live at Lollapalooza 2007: Clap Your Hands Say Yeah =

Live album by Clap Your Hands Say Yeah
- Released: 2007 (worldwide); 18 September 2007
- Recorded: 2007
- Genre: Indie rock
- Length: 53:34
- Label: none
- Producer: Clap Your Hands Say Yeah

Live at Lollapalooza 2007: Clap Your Hands Say Yeah is a live album by Clap Your Hands Say Yeah recorded on August 4, 2007 at the Lollapalooza Music Festival at Grant Park in Chicago, IL.

The album was released on iTunes on September 18, 2007. Its only available format for purchase is digital download; no CD or vinyl release is available.

All proceeds from this downloaded benefit VH1's Save the Music Foundation.

== Track listing ==
1. "Heavy Metal"
2. "Mama, Won't You Keep Them Castles in the Air & Burning?"
3. "Satan Said Dance"
4. "Some Loud Thunder"
5. "Is this Love?"
6. "In This Home on Ice"
7. "Yankee Go Home"
8. "Gimmie Some Salt"
9. "Over & Over Again (Lost & Found)"
10. "Details of the War"
11. "The Skin of My Yellow Country Teeth"
12. "Upon This Tidal Wave of Young Blood"
