= Warren Woessner =

American lawyer

Warren Woessner (born 1944) is an American poet and lawyer, studied creative writing with James McConkey and A. R. Ammons at Cornell University. He moved to Madison, Wisconsin, in 1966 and co-founded Abraxas Magazine with poet James Bertolino in 1968. He was also a founder of WORT-FM and hosted its poetry program. He received a Ph.D. in organic chemistry and a J.D. degree from the University of Wisconsin–Madison in 1971. His poetry has appeared in Poetry, Poetry Northwest, The Nation, Midwest Quarterly, CutBank, Poet Lore, and 5 A.M. Woessner's poetry and literary reviews have been published in The New York Times Book Review, American Book Review, Rain Taxi, and Midwest Review.

== Poetry career ==
Woessner's books of poetry have been published by Ithaca House, New Rivers Press and The Toothpaste Press (now Coffee House Press), among others. In 2008, Backwaters Press published "Clear All the Rest of the Way." Woessner lived in New York City in the early 1980s, where he participated in poetry readings. He has received fellowships from the National Endowment for the Arts and the Wisconsin Arts Board. He was a Loft-McKnight Fellow in 1985 and won the Minnesota Voices Competition sponsored by New Rivers Press in 1986.

== Biography ==
Warren Dexter Woessner was born on May 31, 1944, in New Brunswick, New Jersey, and grew up in a farm town in southern New Jersey. Woessner lives in Minneapolis, where he works as a biotechnology patent attorney.

After receiving his J.D., Woessner worker as an associate attorney for Kenyon & Kenyon in New York, and then at Merchant & Gould in Minneapolis, where he became a partner in 1989. In 1993, he left to form Schwegman Lundberg & Woessner (Minneapolis), which is one of the largest patent law firms in the country. His practice focuses on life sciences patent law, and he provides freedom to operate, due diligence and expert witness services to a wide variety of clients. He has served as Chair of both the Chemical Practice Committee and the Biotechnology Committee of the American Intellectual Property Association and is a Fellow of the Association. He is also a Certified Licensing Professional of the Licensing Executives Society and blogs on patent law issues.

== Bibliography ==
- The Forest and the Trees: Poems (Quixote Press, 1968)
- The Rivers Return (Gunrunner Press, 1969)
- Inroads: Poems (Madison, Wisconsin: Modine Gunch Press, 1970)
- Cross-Country: Poems (Quest Publications, 1972)
- Landing (Ithaca House, 1973)
- Lost Highway (College of the Mainland, 1977)
- No Hiding Place (Spoon River Poetry Press, 1979)
- Storm Lines: A Collection of Poems (New Rivers Press, 1987)
- Clear to Chukchi: Poems from Alaska (Poetry Harbor, 1995)
- Iris Rising (BkMk Press, University of Missouri-Kansas City, 1998)
- Chemistry, A Poem (Pudding House Publications, 2002)
- Greatest Hits 1965-2000 (Columbus, Ohio: Pudding House Publications, 2003)
- Our Hawk (The Toothpaste Press, 2005)
- Clear All the Rest of the Way (The Backwaters Press, 2008)
- Exit-Sky (Holy Cow! Press, 2019)
