= Sean Greenhalgh (musician) =

American drummer

Sean Greenhalgh is a music producer and multi-instrumentalist best known as the drummer in the band Clap Your Hands Say Yeah. Sean is featured in The Warhol Economy: How Fashion Art & Music Drive New York City in regard to Clap Your Hands Say Yeah's rise to blog fame in 2005.
