= Stephen F. Austin State University Press =

American university press

- Parent company: Stephen F. Austin State University
- Country of origin: United States
- Headquarters location: Nacogdoches, Texas
- Publication types: Books
- Official website: sfasu.edu/sfapress/

The Stephen F. Austin State University Press (also known as SFA Press) is a university press affiliated with Stephen F. Austin State University, located in Nacogdoches, Texas. The press publishes both non-fiction and literary works—most of which focus on the history and culture of East Texas. Stephen F. Austin State University Press is a member of Texas A&M University Press's Texas Book Consortium program.

== See also ==
- List of English-language book publishing companies
- List of university presses
