= New Rivers Press =

American non-profit publishing press

New Rivers Press was an American non-profit publishing press located in Moorhead, Minnesota and affiliated with Minnesota State University Moorhead. As of 2020 they had published more than 400 books.

== History and mission ==
New Rivers Press was founded by C.W. “Bill” Truesdale in 1968 out of an old barn in Massachusetts. The first title published by New Rivers Press was So Many Rooms Has a House But One Roof, a poetry collection by Margaret Randall. The press moved to Minnesota in 1978, and in 1982, the press became the first book publisher to obtain 501(c)(3) nonprofit status.

In 2001, when Truesdale died, the press went into suspension and later that year relocated to Minnesota State University Moorhead, where it was revived under different management with a dual mission: to publish literature by new and emerging writers, honoring Truesdale's legacy, and to provide learning opportunities for students.

The activities of the press and its related curriculum were integrated into the school’s Master of Fine Arts in Creative Writing program until its termination in 2014, and also into accounting, art and graphic design, English, marketing, mass communications, promotions, and website development classes at MSUM. Cover designs for New Rivers Press by graphic design students were selected as winners in the 2009, 2010, 2011, 2012, and 2013 American Inhouse Design Awards by Graphic Design USA.

At the time of its announced closure in spring 2022, New Rivers had more than 400 titles in print.

== Series, distribution and funding ==
New Rivers Press book series include American Fiction Anthologies, American Fiction Series, American Poetry Series, Many Minnesotas Project, Many Voices Project, and the New Rivers Abroad Series. The press offers two national awards, The Many Voices Project Prose Prize, and the Many Voices Project Poetry Prize.

== Notable authors and honors ==
Notable authors published by New Rivers Press include Charles Baxter, James Bertolino, Diane Glancy, Albert Goldbarth, Greg Hewett, Robert Peters, Maya Pindyck, Charles Simic, and Warren Woessner.
