= Clap Your Hands Say Yeah =

American indie rock band

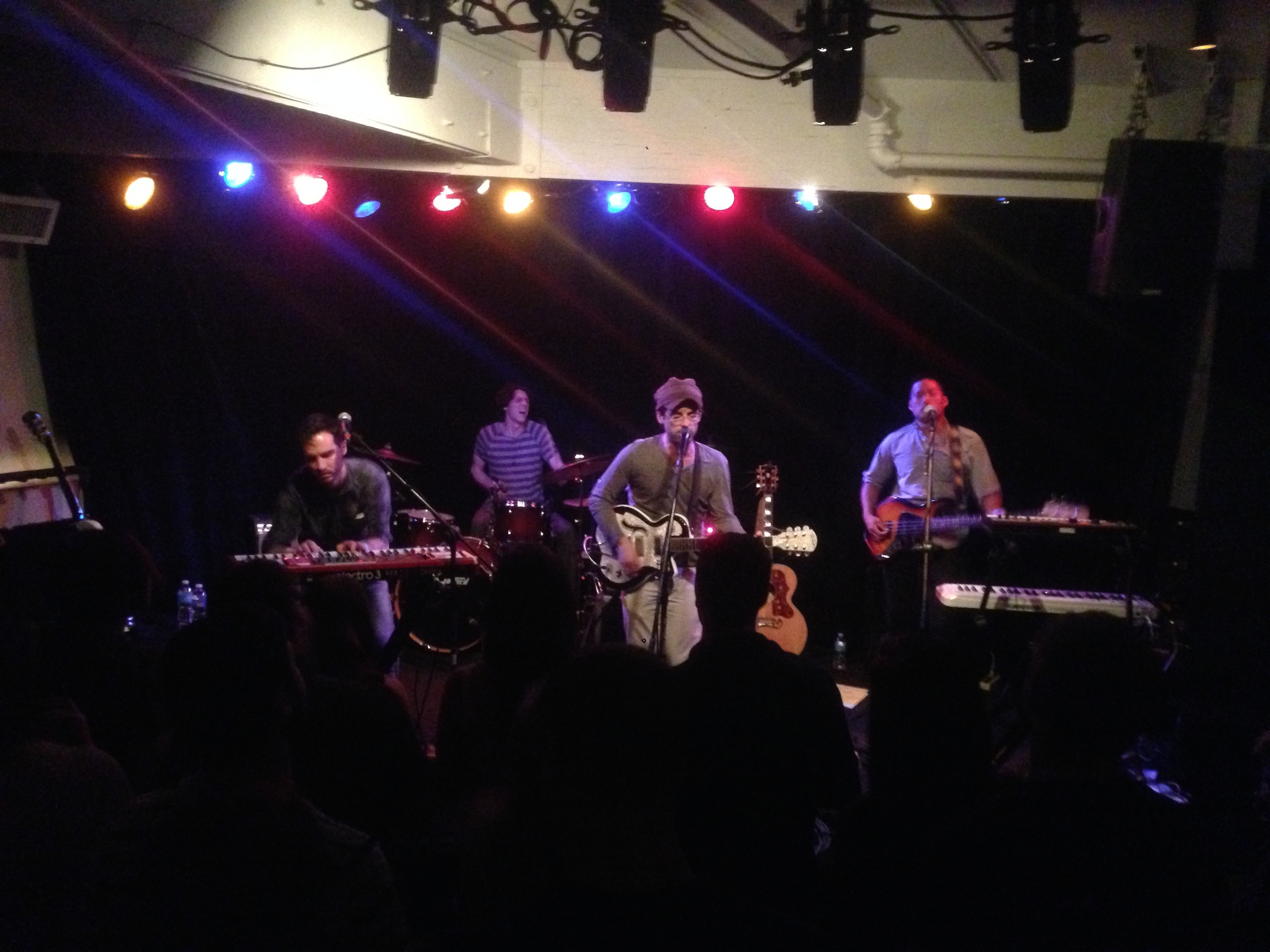
- Clap Your Hands Say Yeah performing in 2014

Background information
- Origin: Philadelphia, Pennsylvania; Brooklyn, New York, U.S.
- Genres: Indie rock, indie pop
- Years active: 2004–present
- Label: Wichita
- Members: Alec Ounsworth
- Past members: Sean Greenhalgh; Robbie Guertin; Lee Sargent; Tyler Sargent
- Website: clapyourhandssayyeah.com

Clap Your Hands Say Yeah is a US indie rock band active since the early 2000s. The band was founded as a collaboration between singer-songwriter Alec Ounsworth, Sean Greenhalgh, Robbie Guertin, Lee Sargent, and Tyler Sargent. Ounsworth now performs under the name, as a solo artist. The band initially gained attention through the early online music blogosphere particularly on MP3 blogs, leading them to be regarded as a defining band of the blog rock era.

Clap Your Hands Say Yeah has released a total of six albums. Their self-titled debut album appeared in 2005 and their most recent, New Fragility, in 2021.

== History ==
=== Early work ===
Ounsworth first started writing songs during high school, and by 2003 was playing small gigs and pursuing various opportunities to get his music heard. Working in his basement studio in Philadelphia, he would test new material on acoustic guitar at a weekly, two-song slot at a drag performance at local venue L'Etage. He then worked on the songs further in his basement, using a drum machine, bass, guitars, keyboards, and vocals.

=== 2004–2006: Clap Your Hands Say Yeah ===
He soon formed a band, consisting of drummer Sean Greenhalgh, keyboardist/guitarist Robbie Guertin, and brothers Lee (guitar/vocals) and Tyler (bass) Sargent, and would frequently commute to New York for rehearsal.

The chosen name derives from some graffiti spotted in the Gowanus section of Brooklyn, huge letters on a wall: "Clap Your Hands Say Yeah". Initially planned as an interim name for one show only, the moniker stuck and was never changed.

The band started to record their material and initially planned a four-song EP. Yet granted extra studio time, more songs were written, and the EP expanded to become their self-titled debut album, Clap Your Hands Say Yeah. Recorded between Providence, RI and Red Hook, Brooklyn, it was made for under $5000, produced and mixed with Adam Lasus, and was first released – completely independently – in 2005.

With an independent DIY and direct-to-fan ethos, the band hand-delivered copies of their debut album to stores in New York and Philadelphia, where they also developed a fanbase including celebrities such as David Byrne and David Bowie, both of whom attended their shows. Early social media exposure on sites like Myspace, and favorable reviews in the then up-and-coming online media, particularly from music website Pitchfork, helped Clap Your Hands Say Yeah build a constant following, a dedicated audience, and commercial success. "CYHSY is...deserving of the hype for what is – quite possibly – a nearly perfect album" (Billboard).

US tours with The National, Dr. Dog, and Architecture In Helsinki followed, alongside appearances at festivals such as Lollapalooza, Coachella, Bonnaroo, Osheaga, Roskilde, Rock en Seine, and Rock Werchter, headline club shows, and performing at Irving Plaza on New Year's Eve 2005. Concerts, re-pressings, and further critical acclaim led to the album peaking at #26 on the Billboard 200. Subsequently, they licensed the album to Wichita Recordings for the rest of the world and continued to distribute directly in the US.

Tracks from the album have been used for numerous TV shows, movies, and advertising, such as Looking For Alaska ("The Skin of My Yellow Country Teeth"), Microsoft Xbox ("Sunshine and Clouds (And Everything Proud)") and Visa ("Upon This Tidal Wave of Young Blood").

=== 2007–2009: Some Loud Thunder ===
The touring and success of their debut album upended Ounsworth's expectations of what it would be like to be a professional musician, and the buzz and hype that engulfed the band coloured the material Ounsworth wrote for the follow-up, Some Loud Thunder. The album was produced together with Dave Fridmann (Mercury Rev, The Flaming Lips) at his Tarbox Road studio.

As with the first record, the band remained defiantly independent, refusing to sign deals that compromised their artistic vision or cashed in on their burgeoning reputation. Meanwhile, the band wrote music for the film The Great Buck Howard.

The song "Satan Said Dance" was used for numerous audio-video synchronization such as in Clark Gregg and Chuck Palahniuk's Choke, and Ryan Philippe's Catch Hell.

=== 2009–2010: Flashy Python and Mo Beauty ===
Four years after Hurricane Katrina, Ounsworth headed to New Orleans to write and record Mo Beauty, released under his own name on ANTI- records. The album highlighted his affinity for the people of the city after the devastation, with producer Steve Berlin (Los Lobos) and Ounsworth hiring local greats like George Porter (Meters, Allen Toussaint) and Stanton Moore (Galactic), Robert Walter, and many more. Paste praised how the album's "resounding use of strings, horns, piano and percussion appears and disappears at unexpected moments with beautifully unsettling results", while SPIN noted that "almost every tune on Mo Beauty equals or betters those on CYHSY's lauded 2005 debut".

At the same time, Ounsworth produced Skin And Bones, a record with a group of friends including Matt Barrick (The Walkmen), Scott McMicken and Toby Leaman of Dr. Dog and Quentin Stolzfus (Mazarin, Light Heat) amongst others, which was self-released on vinyl and online as Flashy Python. Described by Pitchfork as "a wheezy, dark song cycle-cum-inebriated stumble down South Street", the album was recorded in Ounsworth's barn and featured new songs alongside re-workings of Ounsworth's repertoire, partially coinciding with Mo Beauty.

=== 2011–2012: Hysterical ===
In 2011, Clap Your Hands Say Yeah recorded Hysterical with producer John Congleton (St. Vincent, Angel Olsen, Future Islands). Recorded in Hoboken and Dallas, and featuring improv pianist-composer Mike Garson (David Bowie, NIN, Smashing Pumpkins) on 'Adam's Plane', Hysterical garnered some of the best reviews of the band's career to date: "balances the exuberance of the band's first album with beauty and reflection", said NPR, while Consequence of Sound praised the use of "grandiose arrangements, gorgeous strings, and minimal synths."

Throughout this period, the band also appeared several times on primetime TV, invited by David Letterman, Conan O'Brien, and Jimmy Fallon among others.

The album was released on September 12 in the UK, Europe, Japan, and Australia, and on September 20 in the United States. It charted in the US, France, and the UK.

=== 2013–2016: Only Run ===
After the release of the Little Moments EP on their Bandcamp page, on August 1, 2013, their "doing things differently" approach was once again employed for their fourth record, 2014's Only Run. Ounsworth asked fans to submit "relationship stories" which were worked into some of the tracks, and he started doing house shows and more intimate tours.

Recorded once again with David Fridmann in his remote cabin studio, Only Run included collaborations with Kid Koala and The National's Matt Berninger. While Ounsworth performed most of the instruments, the synth-laden album also features drummer Sean Greenhalgh and Zach Tenorio Miller on piano.

Released on June 3, 2014, directly in the US, and the rest of the world via Xtra Mile, Only Run was critically praised. NPR noted "relentless pursuit of invention and reinvention", and Rolling Stone called its songs "big enough to fill a cathedral". Popmatters called it "one of the best independent rock records of 2014".

The release tour included Sasquatch!, Riverfest, Culture Collide Festival, and extensive North America touring, but also presented CYHSY in a new format: performing solo house shows all over the US and abroad, organized by the Undertow Music Collective.

In 2015, the band re-released their 2005 debut self-titled album on CD and vinyl for its 10th anniversary, accompanied by another North American tour.

=== 2016–2019: The Tourist ===
2017's The Tourist was produced by Ounsworth and Nick Krill, and mixed once again by Dave Fridmann, resulting in a "record which pretty much sounds like what a 2005 listener of Clap Your Hands would have expected them to be making ten years down the line" (Drowned in Sound). Ounsworth's ambiguous role (artist/band/group) crystallized even further with both the media and public, garnering praise such as "the holistic craftsmanship of Ounsworth's musicality is impressive" (Allmusic) and acknowledging "the sort of live-wire creativity that keeps music careers going longer than early skeptics could have imagined" (NPR). The album also features other members of Clap Your Hands Say Yeah's touring band such as Matt Wong, Pat Berkery, and Tom Hughes.

The record was released through a worldwide direct distribution deal, except for a license in Japan, once again underlining an uncompromising attitude towards the control of rights and skepticism towards traditional record labels.

The release tour included festivals such as OFF Poland, Acoustic Lakeside Austria, NOS Alive Portugal, and Reeperbahn Festival Hamburg, alongside tours across the US and Canada, all over Europe, Japan, and Mexico.

A tour featuring a setlist consisting of songs from 2007's Some Loud Thunder was undertaken on the occasion of a deluxe reprint for the record's 10th anniversary.

=== 2020–2021: New Fragility ===
February 21, 2021 marked the release of New Fragility, the sixth record as Clap Your Hands Say Yeah, but Ounsworth's eighth overall; indeed, the record has the catalogue number CYHSY08 after a process of consolidation of the artist's complete, worldwide rights towards distribution and administration deals with Secretly Distribution and Domino Publishing.

The album was preceded by a series of Bonus Tracks albums connected to each record, featuring rarities, B-sides, live tracks, demos and more, as well as the singles 'Thousand Oaks', 'Hesitating Nation', and acoustic ballad 'Where They Perform Miracles'.

Several years of personal trauma including the break-up of Ounsworth's marriage, as well as the collective state of unease and anxiety at the state of the world, resulted in a record that is "touching and vulnerable" (American Songwriter) and "poetic, deeply personal" (Allmusic), and one praised by worldwide media like NPR, Uncut, Le Soir, and Les Inrocks. The album was mainly produced by Ounsworth with additional production by Will Johnson, recorded with engineer Britton Beisenherz at Ramble Creek Austin, and mixed by John Agnello at Kaleidoscope Studios over 2019. Alongside Ounsworth, New Fragility features Johnson on drums and Beisenherz on bass, as well as touring members bassist Todd Erk and drummer Jonas Oesterle, and a string quartet conducted and arranged by Brendan Cooney.

In 2021 Ounsworth, as Clap Your Hands Say Yeah, performed exclusive solo shows at Ars Cameralis Festival Katowicz and Ypsigrock Festival Sicily, where he also participated in the artist residency "The Sound of This Place", featuring electronic musicians Eva Geist and Camilla Sparksss, as well as visual artist and architect Gustav Düsing and light designer Julien Dufour.

A digital Deluxe Version of New Fragility was released on March 11, 2022, which featured five additional acoustic versions of songs from the album.

Clap Your Hands Say Yeah toured the US and Europe between March and July 2022.

== Other projects and collaborations ==
Alongside artists such as Yeah Yeah Yeah's Karen O and The National's Matt Berninger, Ounsworth participated in the Parents' Choice award-winning album of Walter Martin (The Walkmen, Jonathan Fire*Eater) We're All Young Together, promoting alternative music for children.

Furthermore, Ounsworth contributed backing vocals to The Walkmen's 'Lisbon' and participated in Los Dreamers, a project based on immigration stories of producers Raul Pacheco (Ozomatli) and Shawn King (musician) (Devotchka).

Ounsworth also collaborated with German mainstream electronic pop artist Claptone on the tracks 'Ghost' and 'Animal' as a featured vocalist and co-writer.

== Members ==
Current members

- Alec Ounsworth – lead vocals, guitar, synthesizers, drum machine (2004–present)

Current touring musicians

- Todd Erk – bass, keyboards (2017–present)
- Jonas Oesterle – drums (2017–present)
- Julie Auxoux – guitar, keyboards, backing vocals (2022–present)

Former members

- Robbie Guertin – keyboards, guitar, backing vocals (2004–2012)
- Lee Sargent – guitar, backing vocals (2004–2012)
- Tyler Sargent – bass (2004–2012)
- Sean Greenhalgh – drums, percussion, synths (2004–2014)

Former touring musicians

- Nick Krill – guitar, keyboards, backing vocals (2013–2018)
- Matt Wong – bass (2013–2017)
- Pat Berkery – drums (2014–2017)
- April Harkanson - guitar, keyboards, backing vocals (2017-2020)

== Discography ==
=== Studio albums ===
Title	Details	Peak chart positions									
Title	Details	US	US Indie	BEL	FRA	GER	IRL	ITA	SCO	SWI	UK
Clap Your Hands Say Yeah	Released: June 28, 2005 (US); Label: Wichita	— (Note: Clap Your Hands Say Yeah did not enter the US Billboard 200, but peaked at number 13 on the US Heatseekers Albums Chart.)	16	29	45	66	11	52	19	95	26
Some Loud Thunder	Released: January 30, 2007 (US); Label: Wichita, V2	47	2	35	75	88	23	—	40	—	45
Hysterical	Released: September 20, 2011 (US); Label: V2	122	20	— (Note: Hysterical did not enter the Ultratop 200 Albums chart, but peaked at number 16 on the Flemish Heatseekers chart.)	180	—	—	—	—	—	198
Only Run	Released: June 3, 2014; Label: Xtra Mile	—	—	—	—	—	—	—	—	—	—
The Tourist	Released: February 24, 2017; Label: CYHSY	—	—	—	—	—	—	—	—	—	—
New Fragility	Released: February 12, 2021; Label: CYHSY / Secretly Canadian	—	—	—	—	—	—	—	—	—	— (Note: New Fragility did not enter the UK Albums Chart, but peaked at number 36 on the UK Record Store Chart.)
"—" denotes a title that did not chart, or was not released in that territory.

=== Live albums ===
- 2007: Live at Lollapalooza 2007: Clap Your Hands Say Yeah (iTunes release)

=== EPs ===
- 2006: Fall 2006 Tour EP (with Architecture in Helsinki and Takka Takka)
- 2013: Little Moments EP
- 2022: Room at the Top EP

=== Singles ===
Title	Year	Peak chart positions				Album
Title	Year	IRL	SCO	UK	UK Indie	Album
"Is This Love?"	2005	41	59	74	11	Clap Your Hands Say Yeah
"In This Home on Ice"	2006	—	49	68	6	Clap Your Hands Say Yeah
"The Skin of My Yellow Country Teeth"	2006	—	67	149	—	Clap Your Hands Say Yeah
"Satan Said Dance"	2007	—	—	—	—	Some Loud Thunder
"Same Mistake"	2011	—	—	—	—	Hysterical
"Maniac"	2011	—	—	— (Note: "Maniac" did not enter the UK Singles Chart, but peaked at number 35 on the UK Physical Singles Chart Top 100.)	—	Hysterical
"Coming Down"	2014	—	—	—	—	Only Run
"—" denotes single that did not chart or was not released
