= Women's suffrage in Minnesota =

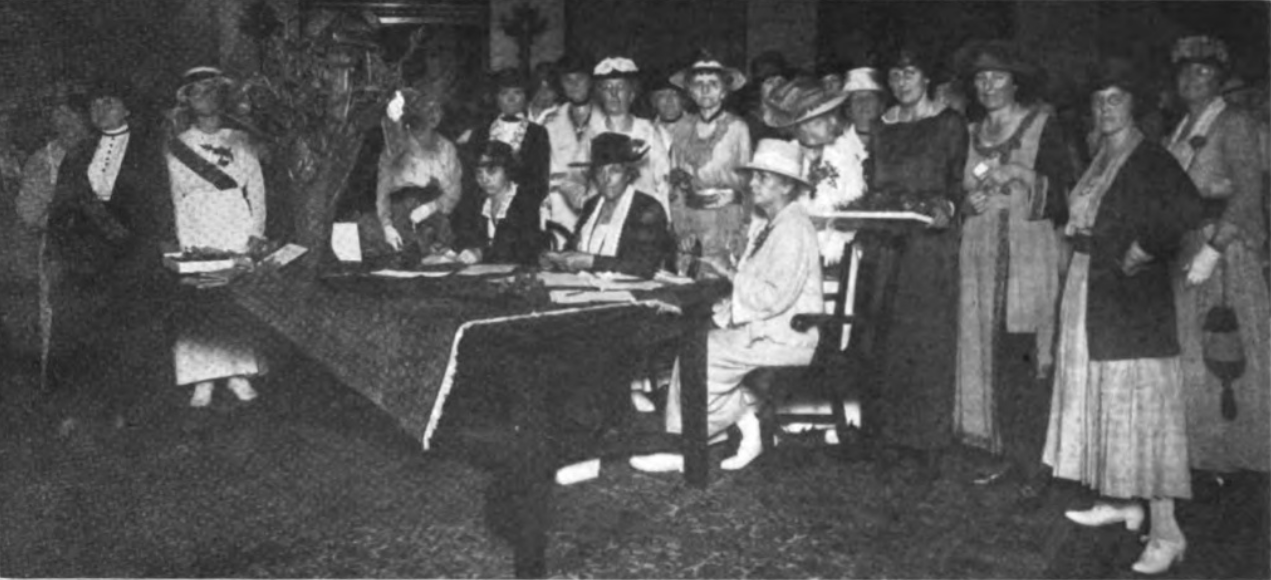
Ratification Day at Minnesota Woman Suffrage Association on September 8, 1919.

The women's suffrage movement in the U.S. state of Minnesota began the mid-1800s and culminated in the ratification of the Nineteenth Amendment by the state's legislature in 1919. The amendment, which prevents states from denying women the right to vote, was officially adopted and added to the Constitution of the United States in 1920.

== Timeline ==
=== Early suffrage activities ===
The earliest recorded educational work for woman suffrage in Minnesota was in 1847, several years before the Civil War period, when Harriet Bishop, a teacher in Saint Paul, addressed small gatherings of women in the privacy of their parlors.

In 1858, a lecture on "The Rights of Women" was given in Champlin by Mary Jackman Colburn, who, nine years later, assisted by Sarah Burger Stearns of Rochester, secured the first hearing before a committee of the Minnesota Legislature. Their bill called for an amendment to the Minnesota Constitution, permitting women to vote the forerunner of many bills of similar wording, that followed. Those early bills received few votes and much ridicule, all of which spurred these women to make greater efforts in securing petitions, resolutions, hearings, and in organizing clubs. The clubs at Champlin, Rochester, Minneapolis, and Kasson were the first to be organized, and when in 1881, a fifth club was formed at Duluth, sufficient interest was assured the organization of the Minnesota Woman Suffrage Association, in the same year. This state association, affiliated with the National American Woman Suffrage Association, functioned steadily from 1881 to 1919 when the vote was won. Its first president was Sarah Burger Stearns, then of Duluth, and she was followed in two years by Dr. Martha Ripley, a pioneer woman physician of Minneapolis, a courageous figure, tremendously interested in the welfare of women and children.

Julia Bullard Nelson of Red Wing served as president from 1890 to 1896. Nelson worked indefatigably to arouse both men and women by lecturing all over the state, securing resolutions from other organizations, getting signers to petitions, lobbying at sessions of the Legislature, and organizing clubs. The first bit of suffrage for women was secured in 1875 when the Legislature referred the question of school suffrage to the voters, and the amendment carried. Among those who were active in that campaign were Mrs. A. T. Anderson, Priscilla M. and Sanford Niles, Martha A. and C. W. Dorsett of Minneapolis, Mrs. Concheta F. Lutz of Redwood Falls, Mrs. T. F. Thurston of Albert Lea, and Mrs. Jessie Gray Cawley of Pipestone.

=== Library and municipal suffrage ===
Library suffrage was granted in 1885. Bills for municipal suffrage were occasionally introduced in the state legislature. Most notably a municipal suffrage bill put forth by Sylvanus Stockwell, which was 'indefinitely postponed' by the legislature. Mrs. C. F. Lutz of St. Paul, and Mrs. Martha J. Thompson of Minneapolis each served two years as president of the state association, in 1896-1900, when suffrage was still unpopular, though gaining popularity steadily. In 1897, a group of Minneapolis woman physicians became identified with the local and state suffrage movement. The leaders were Dr. Cora Smith Eaton, Dr. Ethel Edgerton Hurd, Dr. Annah Hurd, Dr. Bessie Parke Haines, and Dr. Margaret Koch. Dr. Eaton was largely instrumental in bringing the Annual Convention of the National American Woman Suffrage Association of 1901 to Minneapolis, and as Chairman of Arrangements. The woman holding the longest record for active suffrage work was Dr. Ethel E. Hurd, who held many offices on state and local boards.

=== Growing movement and shifting public opinion ===
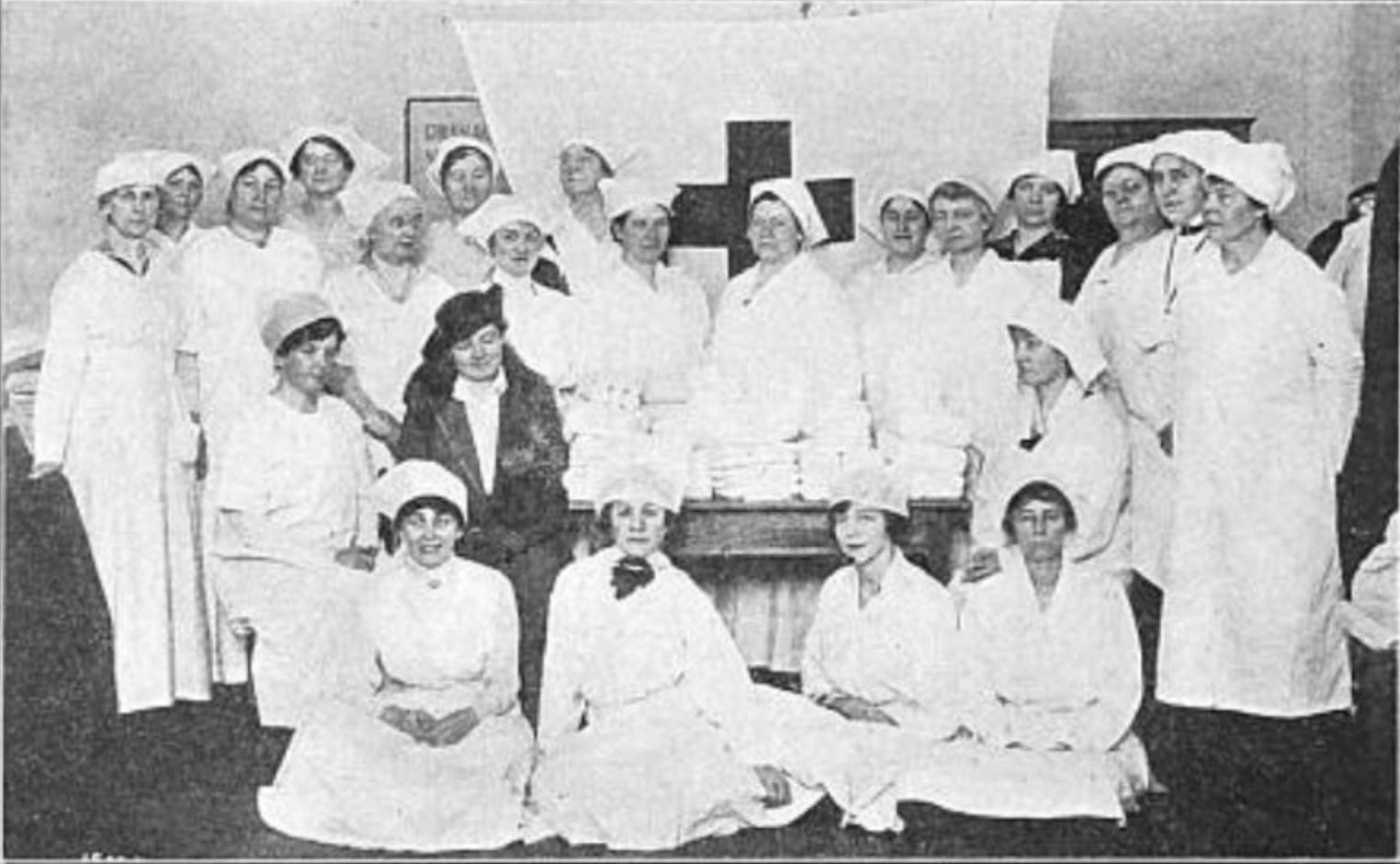
Minneapolis suffragists at Red Cross work (1917)

In 1900, Maud Conkey Stockwell, 12th Ward Chairman of the Minneapolis Political Equality Club, was elected state president at the Stillwater Convention and served in that capacity for 10 years. Under her administration, regular press work was inaugurated, many educators were enlisted in the work, student clubs were formed, distinguished national speakers were taken before colleges, normal and high schools, legislative committees were appointed, brilliant hearings were arranged and many new clubs formed. A valuable worker in Kentucky, Mrs. Eugenia B. Farmer, moved to Saint Paul in 1903, and undertook the press work, carrying it on for 12 years, and winning most of the editors of the state to a liberal stand on the suffrage question.

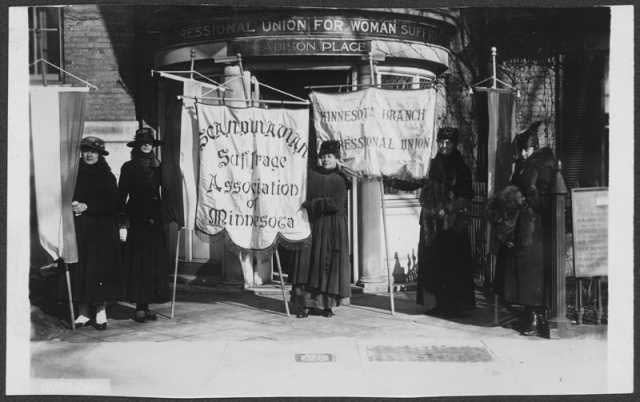
Scandinavian Woman Suffrage Association at "Minnesota Day" in Washington, D.C. in 1917

Public opinion was influenced by the Scandinavian Suffrage Club, organized in 1907 with Mrs. Jenova Martin as president for several years, followed by Mrs. Luth Jaeger. Both of these workers served for a number of years on the state board. During this period, suffrage continued to be the butt of ridicule for the press, as well as for many men and women, but with the growth of the club movement and the idea of economic independence for women, suffrage sentiment made a steady, and by 1913, a rapid gain. Legislatures became more favorable at each session, until by 1917, both houses were ready to submit any bills requested by the state board. Miss Emily Dobbin of St. Paul was elected State President in 1911, serving one year. Then followed Mrs. Alice Ames Hall of St. Paul, Mrs. P. L. De Voist of Duluth, and Mrs. A. H: Bright of Minneapolis, each of whom served one year as president and helped materially in creating favorable sentiment throughout the state.

Among independently organized clubs, were The 1915 Suffrage Club of Minneapolis, The Minneapolis Equal Suffrage Association, (which afterward affiliated with the Minnesota W.S.A.), The Equal Franchise League of St. Paul, and The Congressional Union. Several organizations like The Welfare League of St. Paul and the W. C. Ť. U., had active Franchise Departments, thereby aiding the state work in dislodging old ideas. There were also, many men friends of suffrage who supported the movement from the very beginning, and who were of invaluable assistance. The great suffrage parade in 1914 in Minneapolis, participated in by 2,000 women and men, was indicative of the popularity of the movement at that period. Clara Ueland of Minneapolis, was made State President in 1914, serving until the state's ratification of the Nineteenth Amendment in 1919.

=== Ratification ===
This last period, in which hosts of new workers, as well as the old ones, participated, was marked by greater activities than any that preceded it. For the first time, headquarters rooms were rented and an office force was installed. State and national organizers were engaged and the state was organized by districts. Speakers were sent from Minnesota to help other states in their campaigns, and hundreds of dollars were contributed to the states that were hopeful of winning. The federal amendment was considered at the special session of the legislature, on September 8, 1919, and passed both the state house and senate with very few dissenting votes.

== Gallery ==
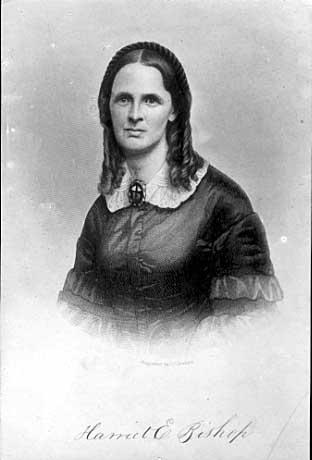
Harriet Bishop

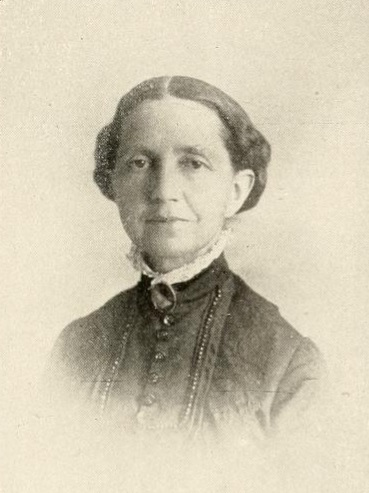
Sarah Burger Stearns

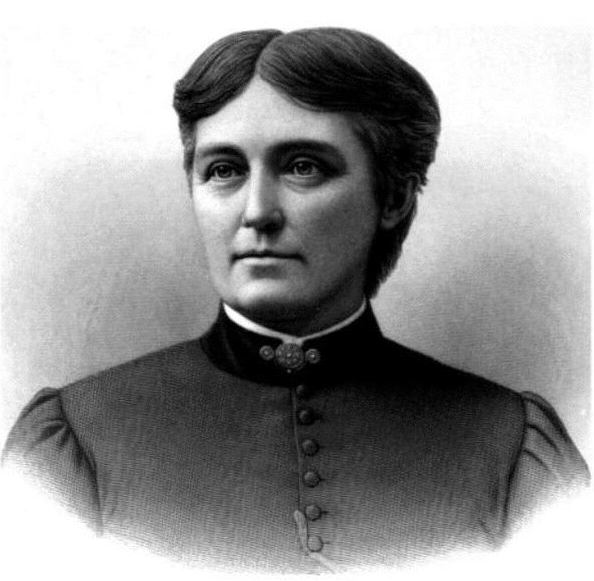
Martha Ripley

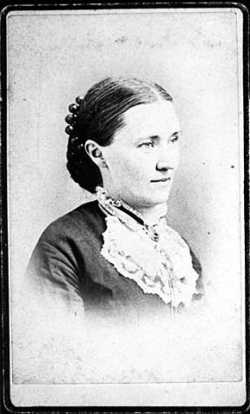
Julia Bullard Nelson

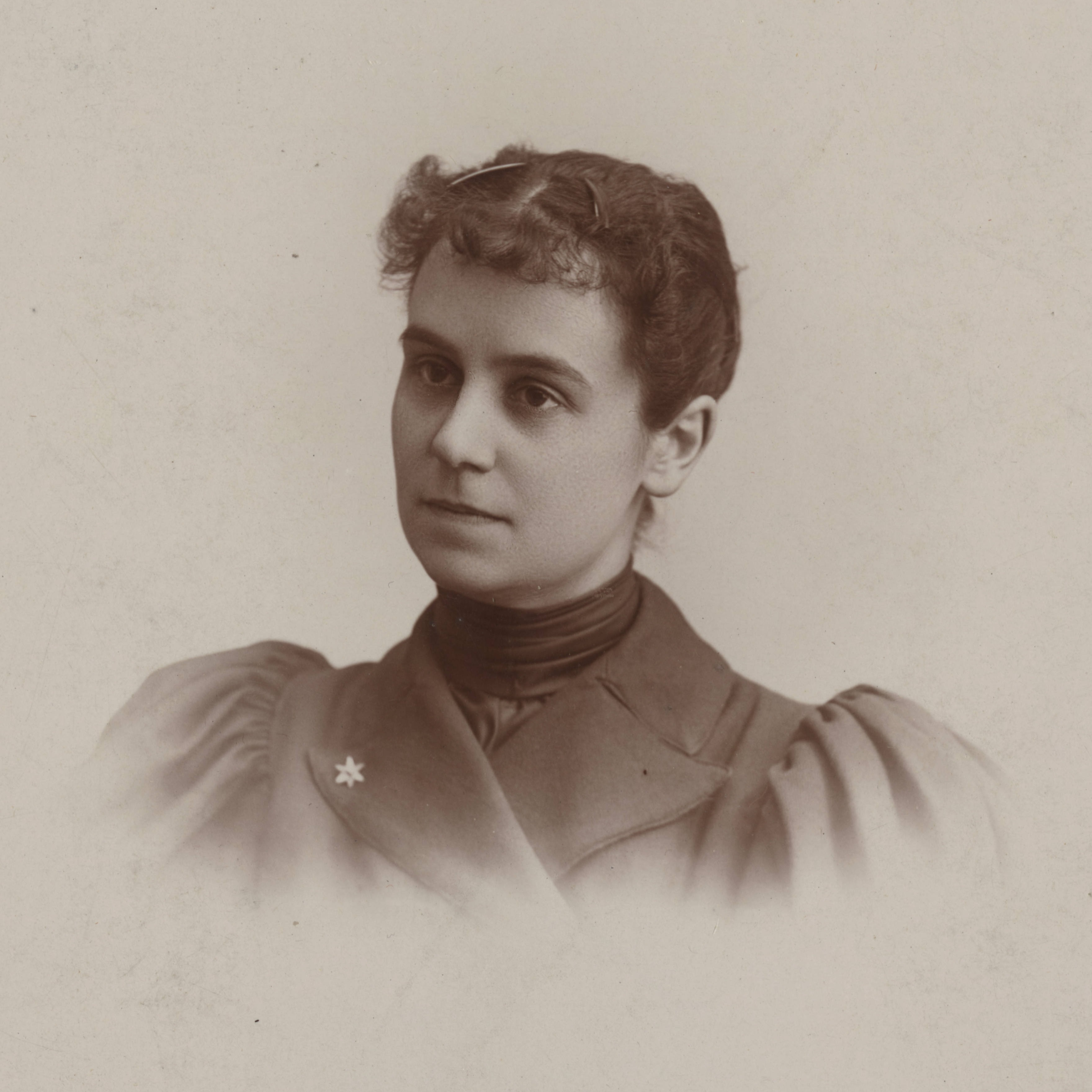
Cora Smith Eaton

== See also ==
- Minnesota Woman Suffrage Memorial
- Women's suffrage in states of the United States
