= Scandinavian Woman Suffrage Association =

American women's suffrage organization

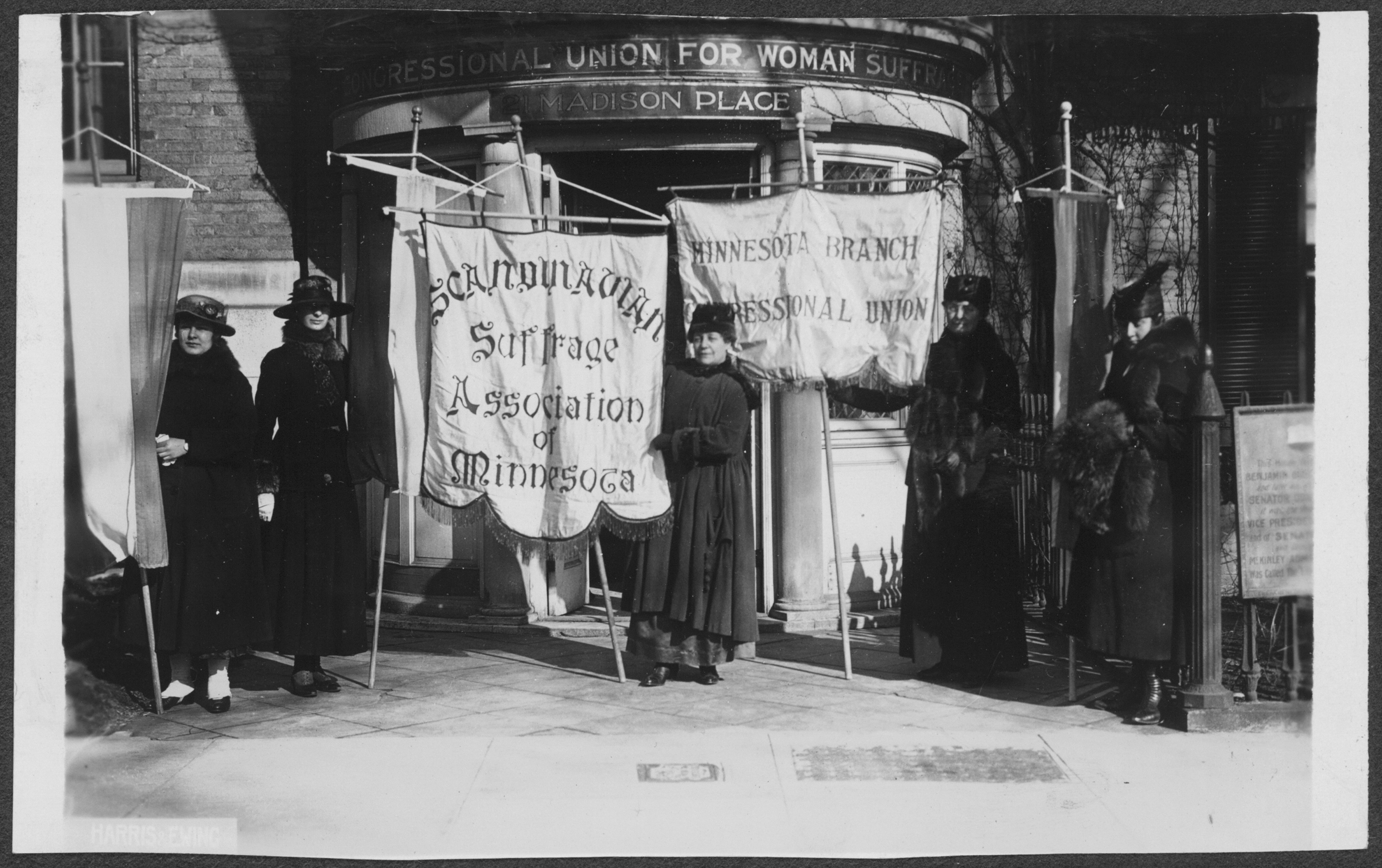
- Suffragists of the National Woman's Party and SWSA in Washington, D.C. in 1917 during the Silent Sentinels demonstration
- Formation: 1907; 119 years ago
- Founded at: Minneapolis, Minnesota, U.S.
- Dissolved: 1920; 106 years ago
- Headquarters: Minneapolis
- Presidents: Jenova Martin; Nanny Mattson Jaeger
- Key people: Ethel Edgerton Hurd; Clara Ueland
- Affiliations: Minnesota Woman Suffrage Association

The Scandinavian Woman Suffrage Association (SWSA) was an American women's suffrage group founded in 1907 with the help of Ethel Edgerton Hurd. The SWSA was affiliated with the larger Minnesota Woman Suffrage Association (MWSA) and provided a critical connection between the Minnesota Scandinavian community and the broader Women's suffrage movement in the United States.

== History and formation ==
Women's suffrage in Minnesota began in the 1870's with the introduction of women having the right to vote in school board elections in 1875. The Minnesota Woman Suffrage Association (MWSA) was founded in 1881 by Sarah Burger Stearns and Harriet Bishop. Immigrant groups in Minnesota however had little representation of their own communities in the matter, by 1901 Anna Gjertson was hired by suffragist Clara Ueland in order to organize women in Scandinavian communities in Minnesota.

The Scandinavian Women’s Suffrage Association (SWSA) was founded in Minneapolis in 1907 with the assistance of American suffragist Ethel Edgerton Hurd, an executive official with the MWSA. The SWSA was primarily made up of first and second generation women and men of Swedish, Norwegian, and Danish ancestry. Although men were welcomed to join the SWSA, the group was exclusively led by women. The first president of the SWSA was Jenova Martin, a Norwegian-American suffragist, while the second president of the SWSA was Nanny Mattson Jaeger, a Swedish-American suffragist and the daughter of Minnesota politician Hans Mattson. Martin and Jaeger had conflicting ideas however on how the SWSA should be led, Martin was primarily concerned with Scandinavian cultural preservation, while Jaeger was an assimilationist who emphasized the role of American motherhood and leading Scandinavian women into full United States citizenship with the rights to vote. Ethnic membership of the SWSA swayed dependent on the group leader. The SWSA did not charge membership dues for its members as it encouraged participation from all social classes.

== Activity ==
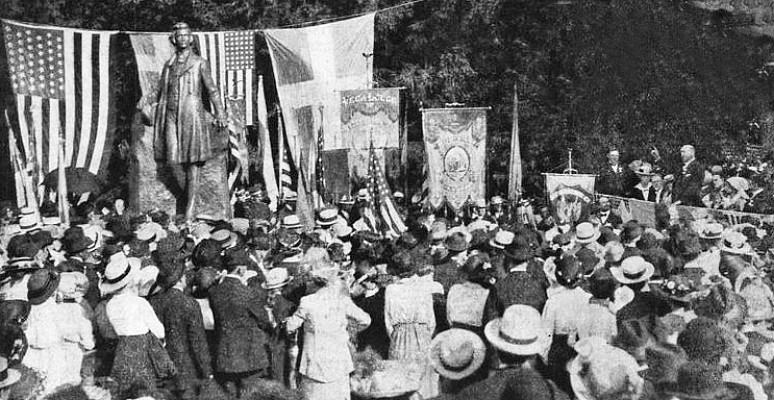
The SWSA at the unveiling of the Gunnar Wennerberg statue in Minnehaha Park in 1915

The SWSA was active from 1907 to 1919 in a variety of demonstrations. In 1914 the SWSA took part in a political demonstration march down Hennepin Avenue where members of the SWSA marched alongside 2,000 suffragists. During the march members of the SWSA wore traditional Norwegian bunad and Swedish nationella dräkten to demonstrate their heritage and ancestry. The goal of the march was to encourage American politicians to allow women the right to vote, Norway for example had allowed women of certain income suffrage in municipal elections beginning in 1910 and national elections in 1913.

The SWSA was disbanded in August, 1920, following the passing of the Nineteenth Amendment to the United States Constitution. Following its disbandment in 1920, some members of the SWSA worked to end child labor in Minnesota mines, farms, and production industries.
