= Ueland =

Ueland is a surname. Notable people with the surname include:

- Arnulf Ueland (1920-2004), American businessman and politician
- Brenda Ueland (1891–1985), American journalist and non-fiction writer
- Clara Ueland (1860-1927), American community activist
- Eric Ueland (born 1965), American political advisor
- Ivar Ueland (1943–2020), Norwegian politician
- Jonas Ueland Kolstad (born 1976), Norwegian footballer
- Ole Gabriel Ueland (1799-1870), Norwegian politician
- Ole Gabriel Ueland (1931–2009), Norwegian politician
- Osmund Ueland (born 1947), Norwegian civil servant

== See also ==
- Uwland, surname
