= Minnesota Woman Suffrage Memorial =

Women's suffrage memorial in Minnesota, United States

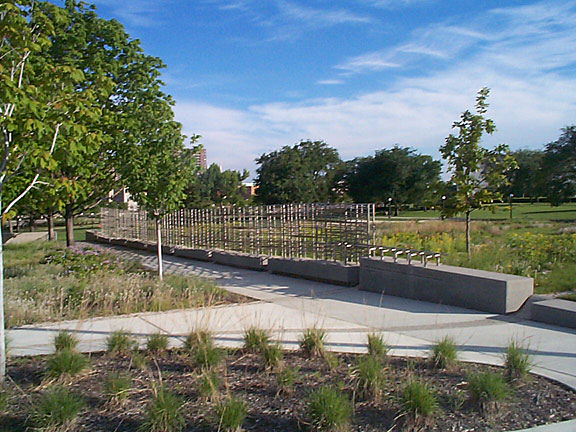
- Artist: Raveevarn Choksombatchai and Ralph Nelson
- Year: 2000
- Type: Steel
- Location: Saint Paul, Minnesota; 44°57′12″N 93°06′03″W

The Minnesota Woman Suffrage Memorial is a permanent feature on the grounds of the Minnesota State Capitol in Saint Paul. It commemorates the women’s suffrage movement in the state and 25 women whose achievements were important to the Minnesota Woman Suffrage Association (MWSA). The memorial was designed by architects Raveevarn Choksombatchai, Martha McQuade, and Ralph Nelson.

== History ==
The MWSA led the campaign for the state legislature to ratify the Nineteenth Amendment to the United States Constitution, to give women the right to vote. Minnesota was the 15th state to ratify the amendment, doing so in 1919.

The idea for the memorial was raised by members of the Minnesota League of Women Voters and a design competition was held. The winning design, chosen from 16 submissions, was the work of Raveevarn Choksombatchai and Ralph Nelson. The State Legislature agreed in 1996 to appropriate resources for the construction of the memorial. Groundbreaking took place on August 26, 1998, the 75th anniversary of the ratification of the 19th amendment, and the monument was opened on August 26, 2000. The ceremony was presided over by Lt. Gov. Mae Schunk.

The memorial consists of a garden entitled Garden of Time: Landscape of Change and features a series of aluminum signs, each one of which describes an event in the United States women's suffrage campaign. A trellis bears the names of 25 leaders of the movement in Minnesota.

In 2004, the memorial was redesigned by Roger Grothe.

== List of women named on the memorial ==
=== Harriet Bishop ===
Bishop (1818–1883) came to Minnesota as a teacher and opened the first public school and Sunday school in the territory. She was active in both the temperance and suffrage movements.

=== Fanny Fligelman Brin ===
Brin (1884–1961)] was an activist for women's rights, Jewish welfare, and world peace. She served as president of the National Council of Jewish Women (NCJW) from 1932 to 1938, and was appointed by Eleanor Roosevelt to serve on a national committee to study humanitarian needs during the Great Depression.

=== Myrtle Cain ===
Cain (1894–1980) served as president of the Women's Trade Union of Minneapolis and was one of the first women in the Minnesota House of Representatives.

=== Mary Jackman Colburn ===
Colburn (1811–1901) was born in 1811 in Newburyport, Massachusetts, and graduated from Harvard University in the 1840s, with a degree in medicine. She married Samuel Colburn, and they moved to Moline, Illinois, and then to Champlin, Minnesota. Mary practiced medicine in both locations.

Colburn became active in the suffrage movement and, in 1858, delivered what is thought to be the first public lecture on the subject in Minnesota. It was titled "Rights and Wrongs of Woman".

In 1864, Colburn won a state-sponsored essay competition on the theme "Minnesota as a Home for Emigrants"; the letter notifying her of her prize addressed her as "sir". Shortly afterward, Colburn wrote to a friend, "I am doing but little now on the suffrage question, for I will not stoop longer to ask of any congress or legislature for that which I know to be mine by the divine law of nature".

Despite those words, in 1867, Colburn and Sarah Burger Stearns, along with other "friends of equality" petitioned the state legislature to amend the constitution, removing the word male from the section which enfranchised "every male person". The women were granted a hearing where Colburn read a prepared statement but, ultimately, no action was taken.

Colburn gave lectures throughout Minnesota on the "Patriotism of Woman" and in 1869, Colburn formed a suffrage society in Champlin, one of the first in Minnesota. After the passage of an amendment in 1875 allowing women to vote on issues related to state education, Colburn was elected school director in Champlin. Colburn was one of the founders of the MWSA.

Samuel died in 1884 and Mary in 1901; they are buried in Champlin Cemetery in Champlin, Minnesota.

=== Sarah Tarleton Colvin ===
Colvin (1865–1949) was a Johns Hopkins-trained nurse who served in the Red Cross during World War I. She served as chairman of the Minnesota chapter of the National Woman's Party and was arrested during the "Watchfire for Freedom" demonstrations of January 1919. Colvin was sentenced to five days in jail where she participated in a hunger strike.

=== Gratia Countryman ===
Countryman (1866–1953) was a librarian who led the Minneapolis Public Library from 1904 to 1936 and the Minnesota Library Association from 1904 to 1905.

=== Nellie Griswold Francis ===
Francis (1874–1969) was a suffragist and civil rights activist who was the first president of the African-American suffragist group, Everywoman Suffrage Club.

=== Elizabeth Hunt Harrison ===
Harrison (1848–1931) was involved in many woman's suffrage organizations, including the MWSA, and in 1930 was one of six Minnesota women selected for the roll of honor of the National League of Women Voters.

=== Ethel Edgerton Hurd ===
Hurd (1845–1929) earned a medical degree in 1897 from the University of Minnesota at the age of 52 and went into practice with her daughter, Anna. She helped to organize the Medical Women's Club of Minneapolis and the Minnesota Scandinavian Woman Suffrage Association, and served on the board of directors of the MWSA. Hurd's also served as president for the Political Equality Club of Minneapolis and published a book titled Woman Suffrage in Minnesota: A Record of the Activities in Its Behalf Since 1847.

=== Nanny Mattson Jaeger ===
Jaeger (1859–1938) was the president of the Political Equality Club of Minneapolis and the Minnesota Scandinavian Woman Suffrage Association.

=== Bertha Berglin Moller ===
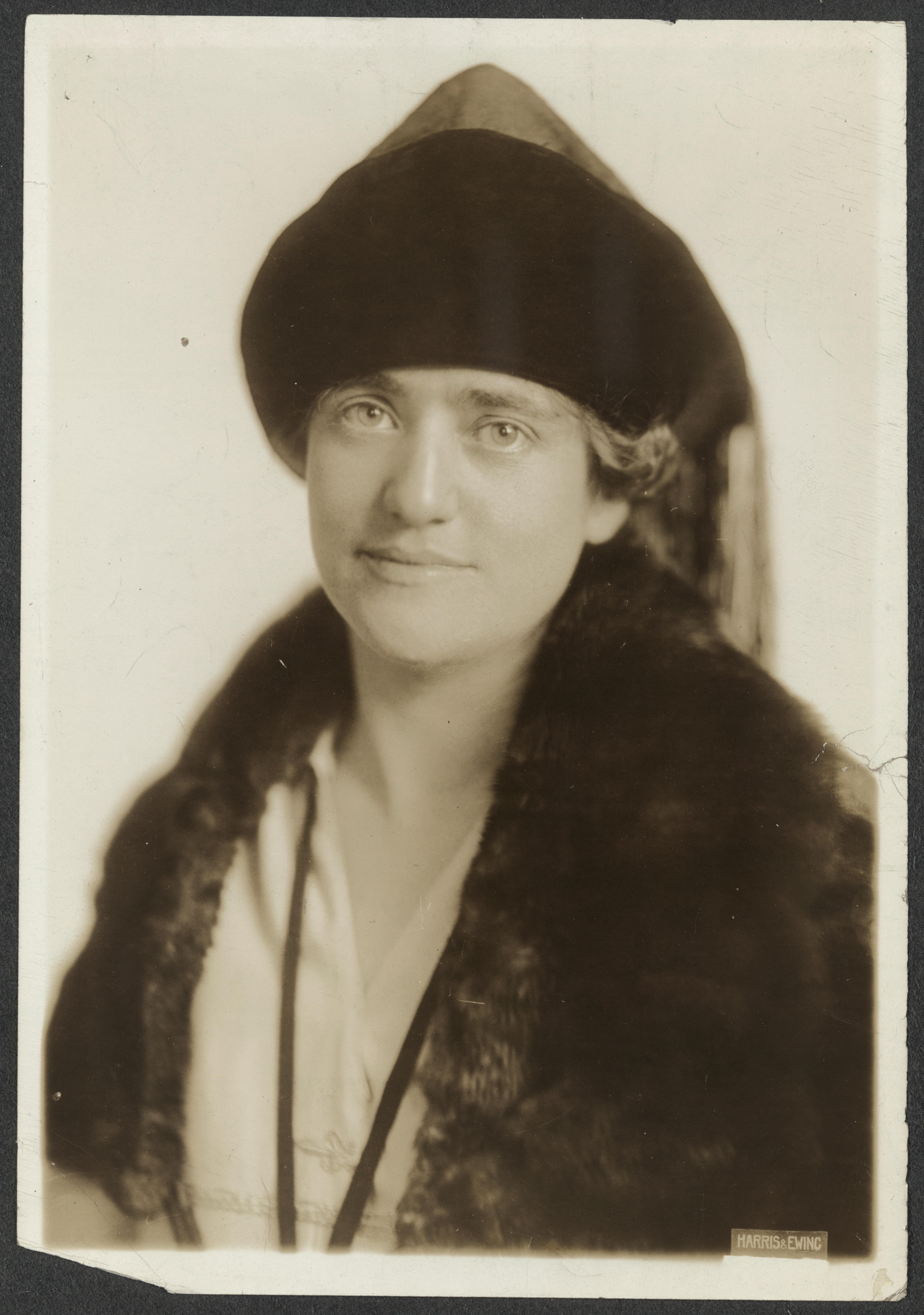
Bertha Moller

Moller (1888–unknown) served as secretary of the Minnesota branch of the National Woman's Party and demonstrated at the White House and the Capitol. She was arrested 11 times and led a hunger strike in jail after one arrest.

=== Julia Bullard Nelson ===
Nelson (1842–1914) was a founder of the MWSA and president from 1890 to 1896, and vice-president of the state Women's Christian Temperance Union from 1889 to 1890.

=== Emily Gilman Noyes ===
Noyes (1854–1930) was an influential supporter of suffrage from St. Paul who helped found the Woman's Welfare League in 1912, and served as its first president. She was also a vice-president of the MWSA, a founding member of the Ramsey County League of Women Voters and, in 1930, was one of six Minnesota women named to the honor roll of the National League of Women Voters.

=== Anna Dickie Olesen ===
Olesen (1885–1971) was the first woman nominated by a major party to run for U.S. Senator.

=== Mabeth Hurd Paige ===
Paige (1870–1944) earned a law degree from University of Minnesota, founded the Minneapolis chapter of the Urban League, and was one of the first women in the Minnesota House of Representatives.

=== Martha Rogers Ripley ===
Ripley (1843–1914) was a physician and founder of the Maternity Hospital in Minneapolis; she also served as MWSA president from 1883 to 1889.

=== Maria Sanford ===
Sanford (1836–1920) was a professor of history at Swarthmore College (1871–1880) and University of Minnesota (1880–1909) who joined the suffrage movement late in life.

=== Josephine Schain ===
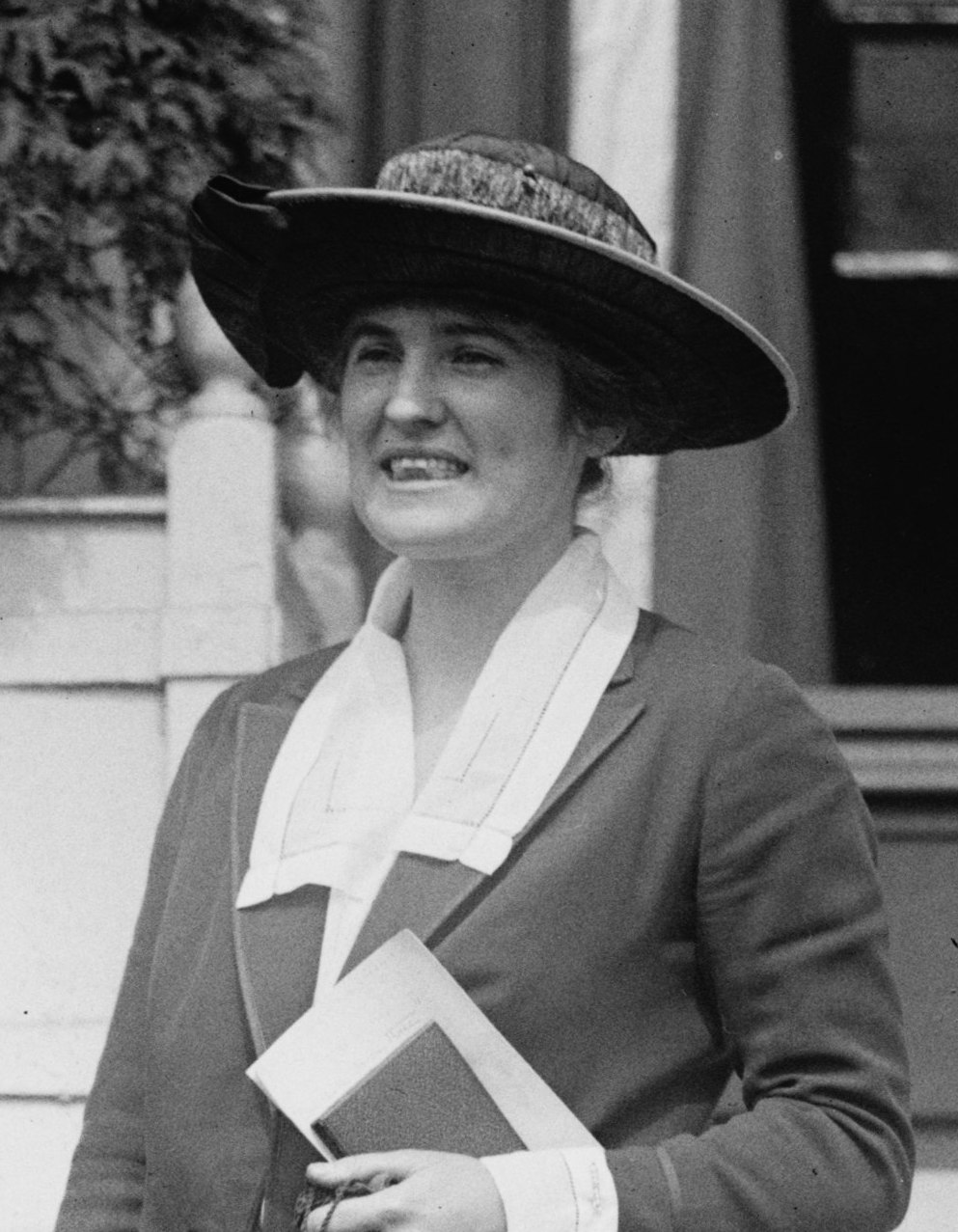
Josephine Schain

Schain (1886–1949) graduated from the University of Minnesota in 1886 and later attended the Geneva Graduate Institute. She worked in social services both in Minnesota and in New York City. She served as the national director of the Girl Scouts from 1930 to 1935. Schain resigned in order to become the chair of the National Committee on the Causes and Cure of War (NCCCW). In 1943, Schain was the first woman to officially represent the U.S. at a United Nations Conference. She was a consultant at the formation of the United Nations in San Francisco in 1945.

=== Josephine Sarles Simpson ===
Simpson (1862–1948) was a charter member of the Woman's Club of Minneapolis and a noted orator in the cause of woman suffrage. She served on the board of directors of the National American Woman Suffrage Association (NAWSA) and as president of the Hennepin County Woman Suffrage Association.

=== Sarah Burger Stearns ===
Stearns (1836–1904) was a founder of the MWSA and its first president (1881–1883).

=== Maud Conkey Stockwell ===
Stockwell (1863–1958) was president of the MWSA from 1900 to 1910, and founded several suffrage clubs. She took part in a nationwide petition, carrying Minnesota's 20,000 signatures in favor of suffrage to the capitol in Washington D.C.

=== Jane Grey Swisshelm ===
Swisshelm (1815–1884) was a St. Cloud newspaper editor who wrote about abolition, women's rights, and suffrage.

=== Clara Hampson Ueland ===
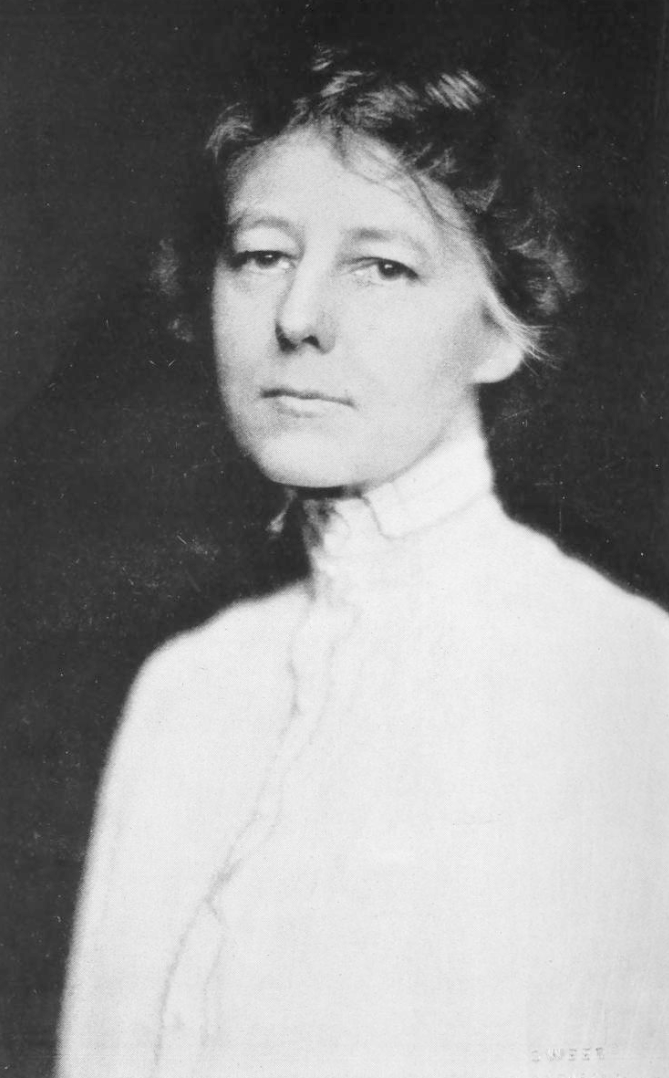
Marguerite Milton Wells

Ueland (1860–1927) was the president of the MWSA during the ratification of the 19th amendment and the first president of the Minnesota League of Women Voters.

=== Marguerite Milton Wells ===
As a member of the MWSA, Wells (1872–1959) organized the petition drive that resulted in unanimous support from the Minnesota delegation for the passage of the Nineteenth Amendment. In 1919, she was elected the first vice-president of the Minnesota League of Women Voters and, six months later, became president. She held this position until 1934, when she became the national president.

=== Alice Ames Winter ===
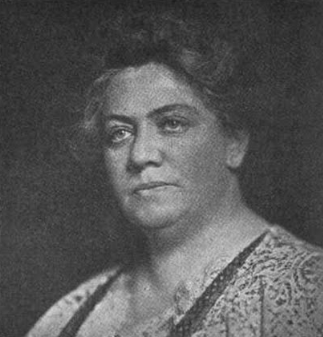
Alice Ames Winter, 1921

Winter was one of the founders and served as president of the Woman's Club of Minneapolis. After World War I, she served as president of the General Federation of Women's Clubs (GFWC).

== Gallery ==
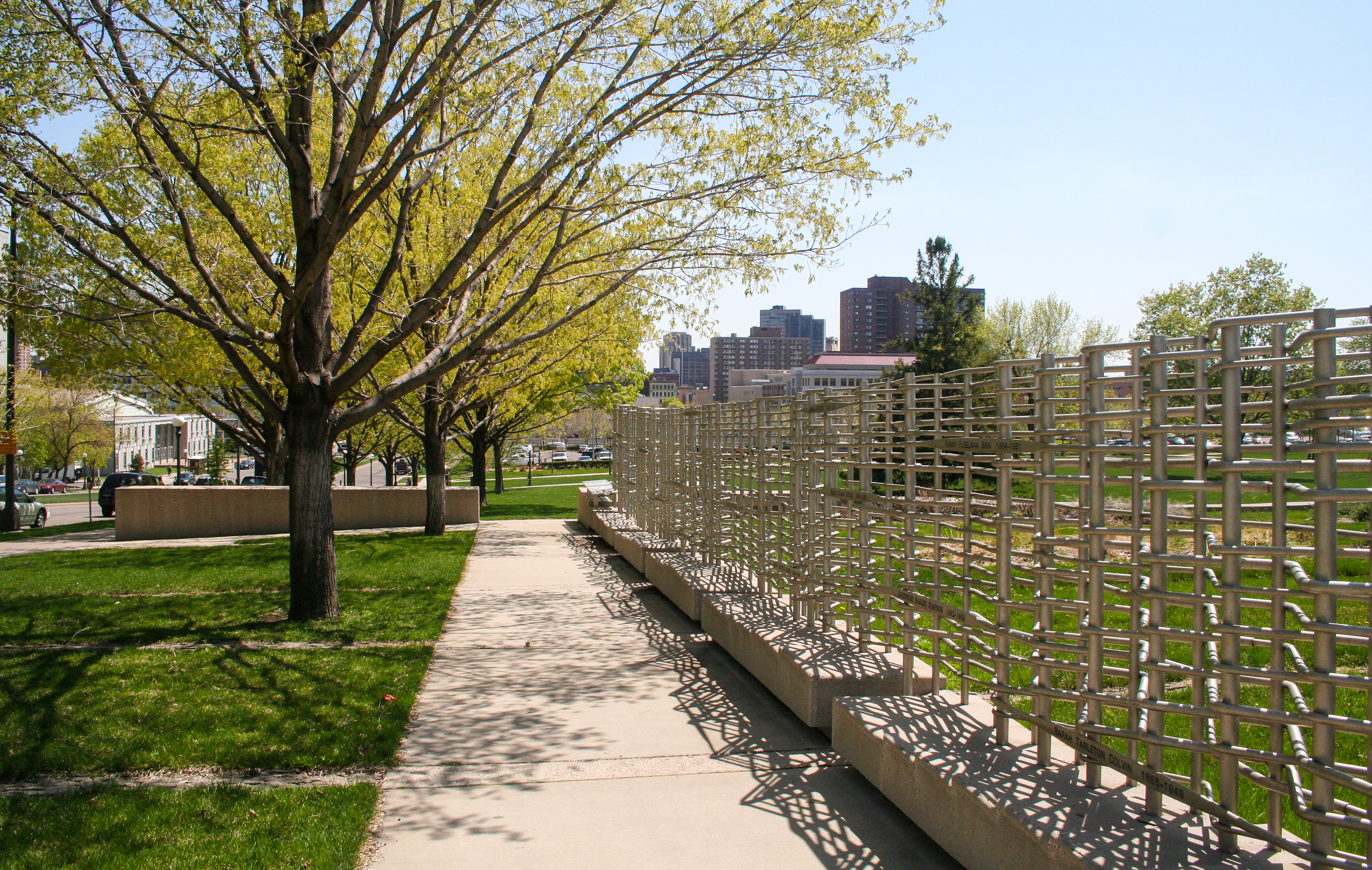

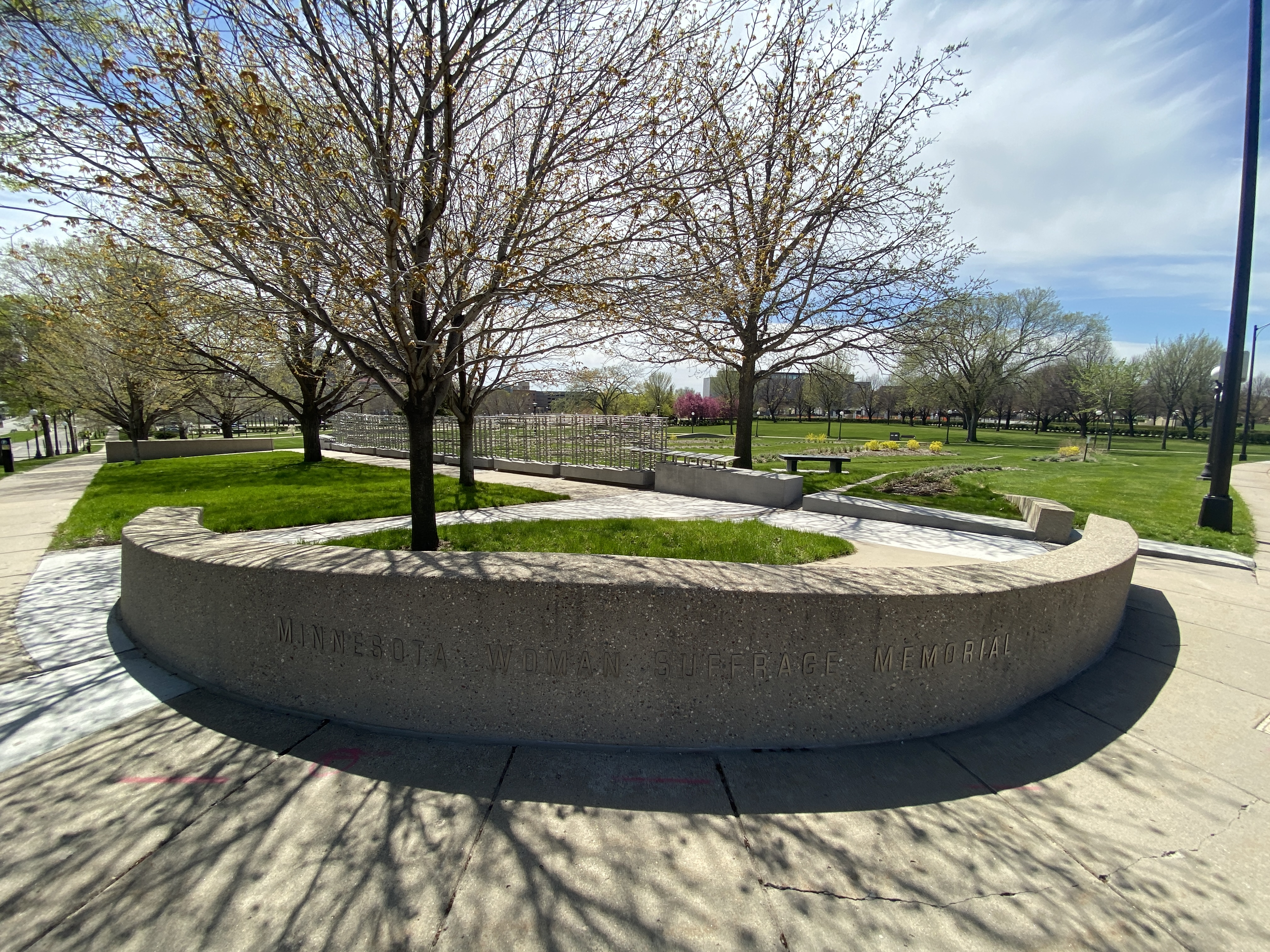

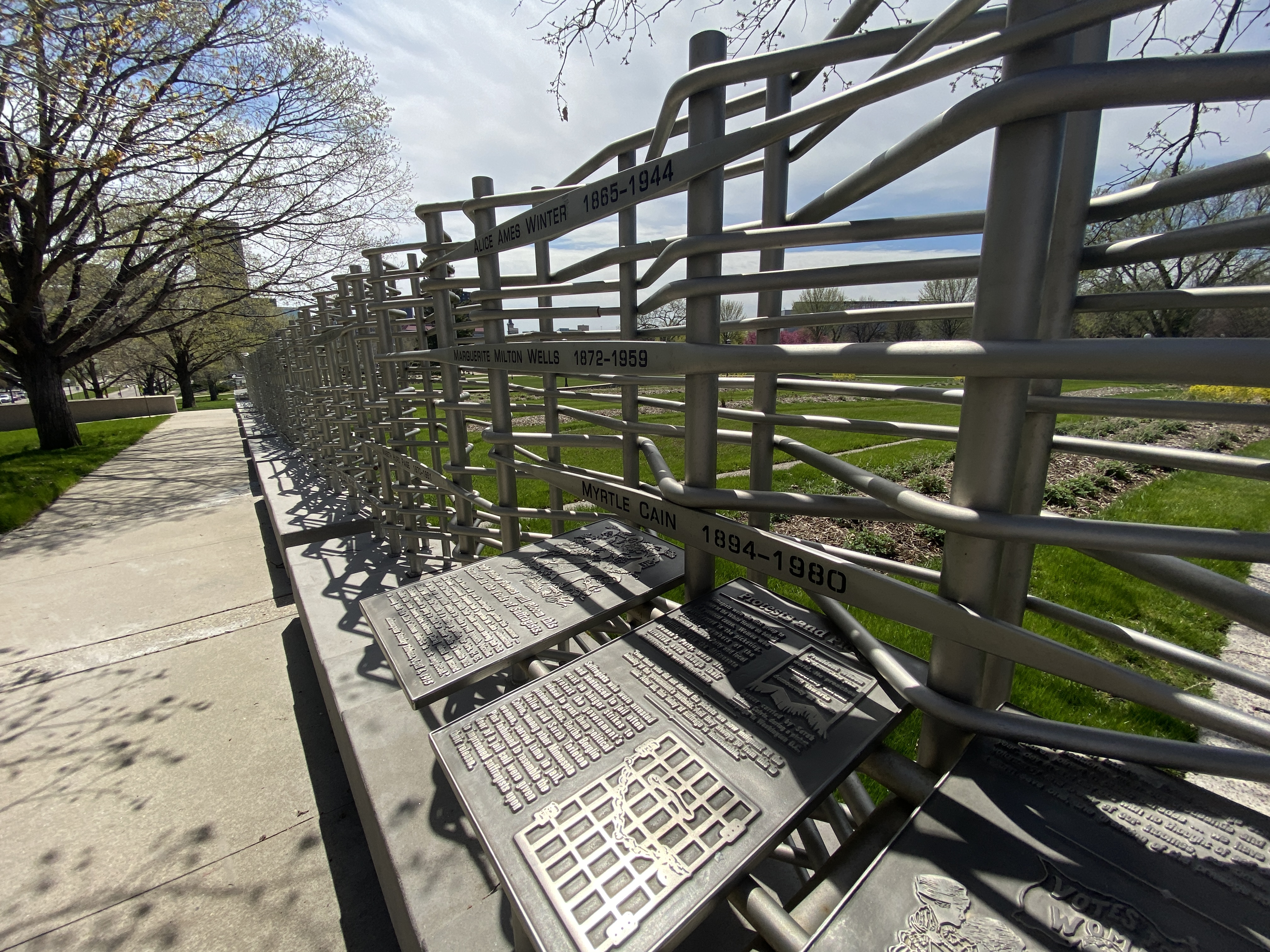

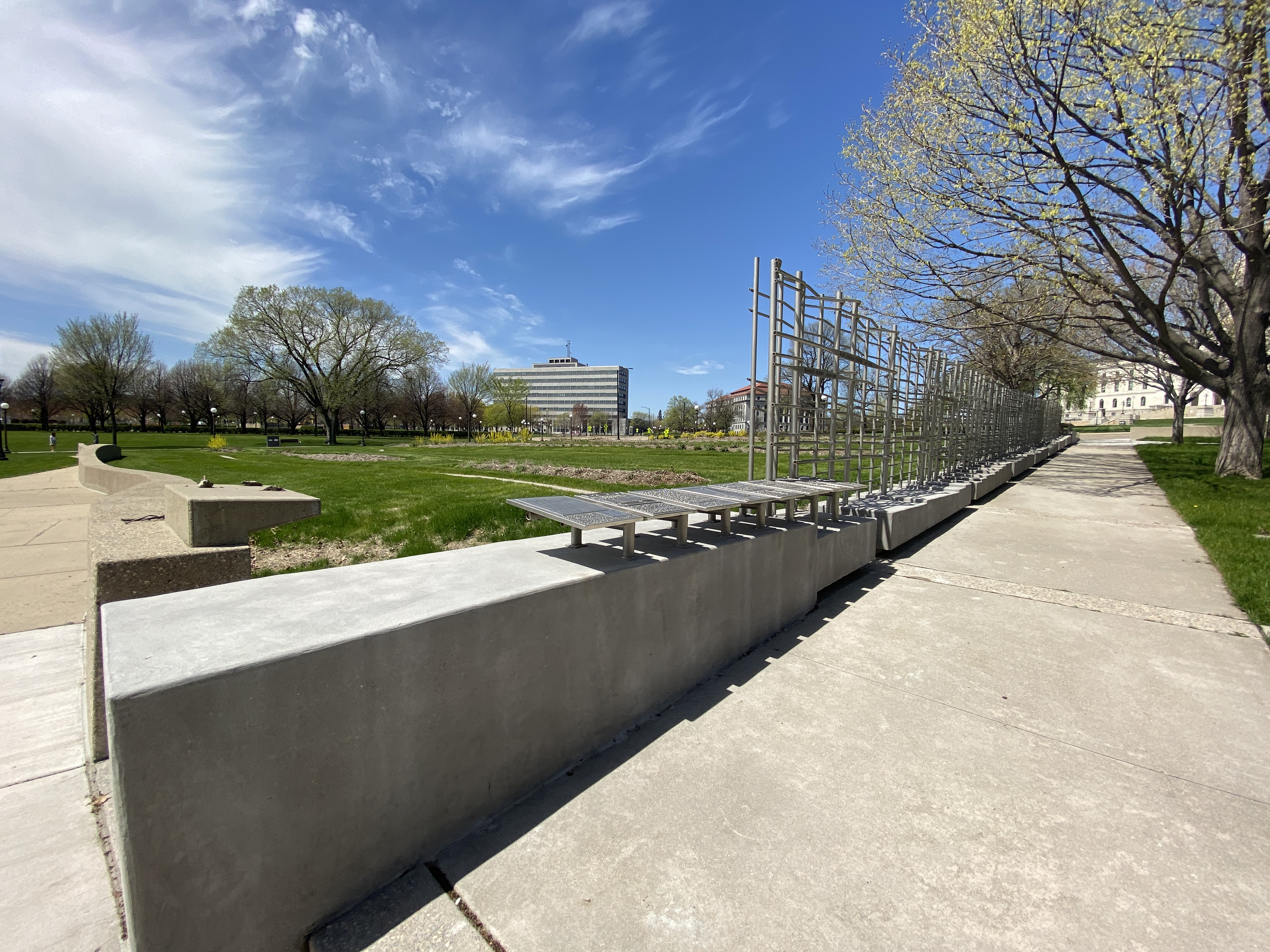

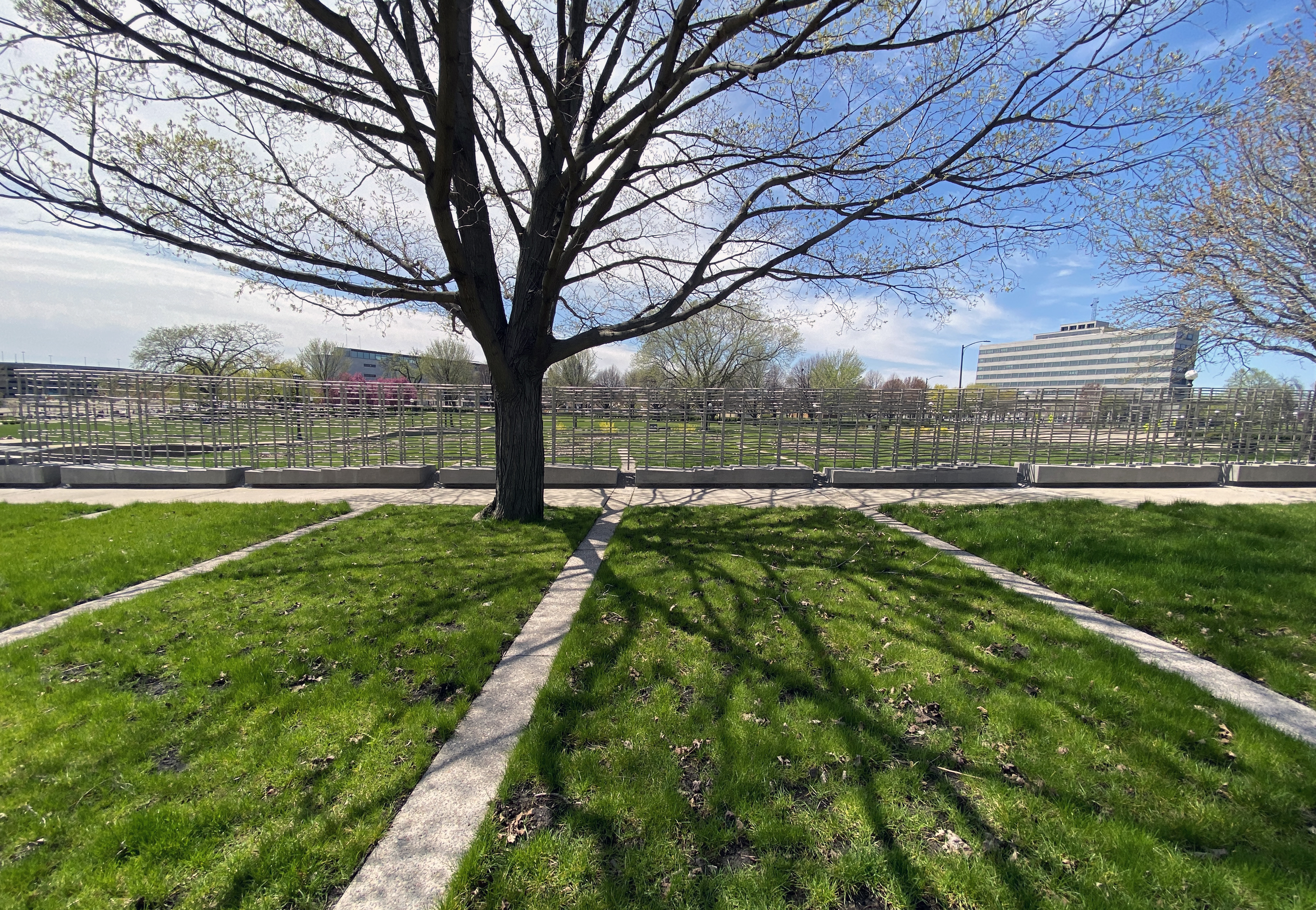

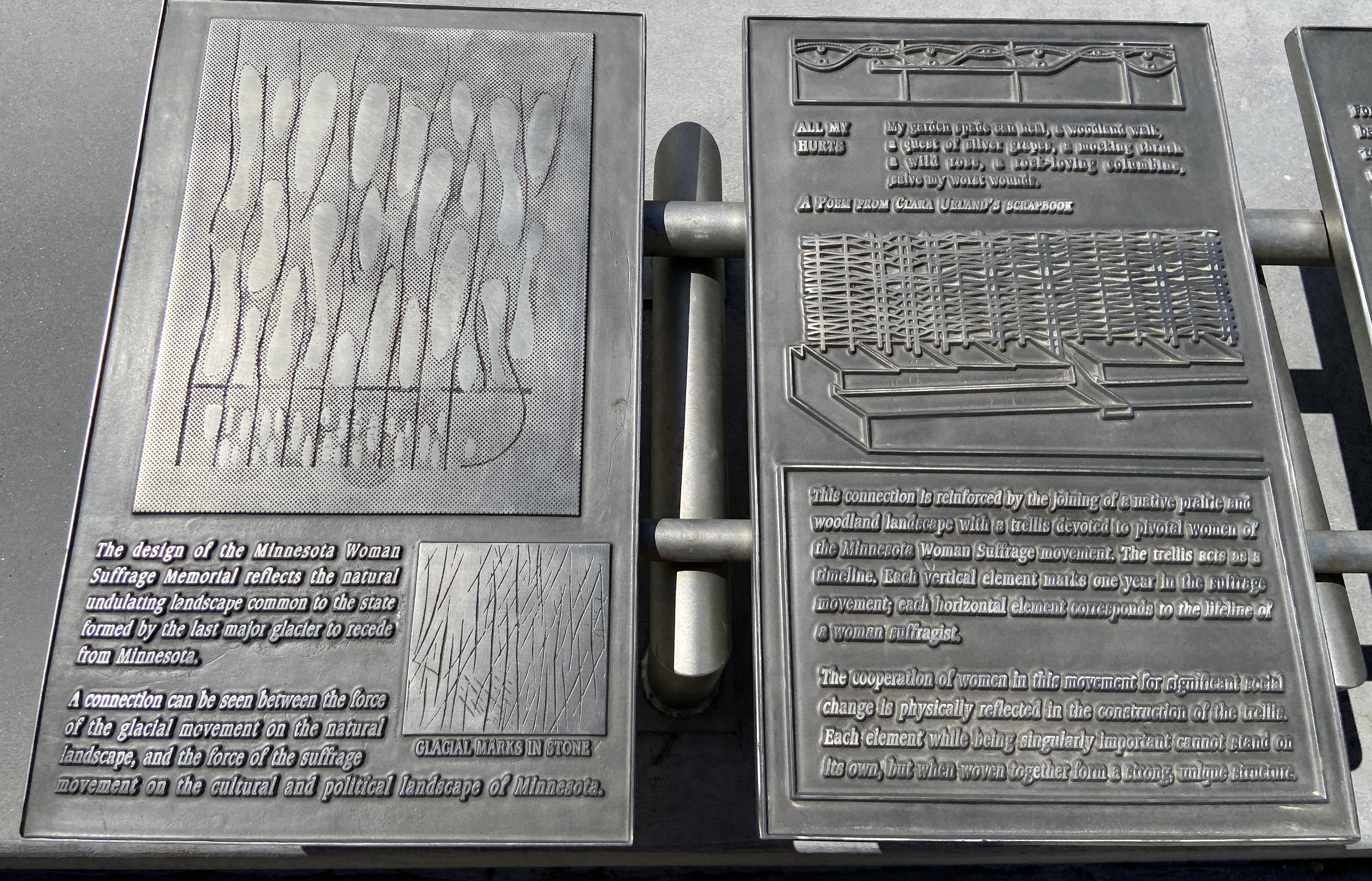

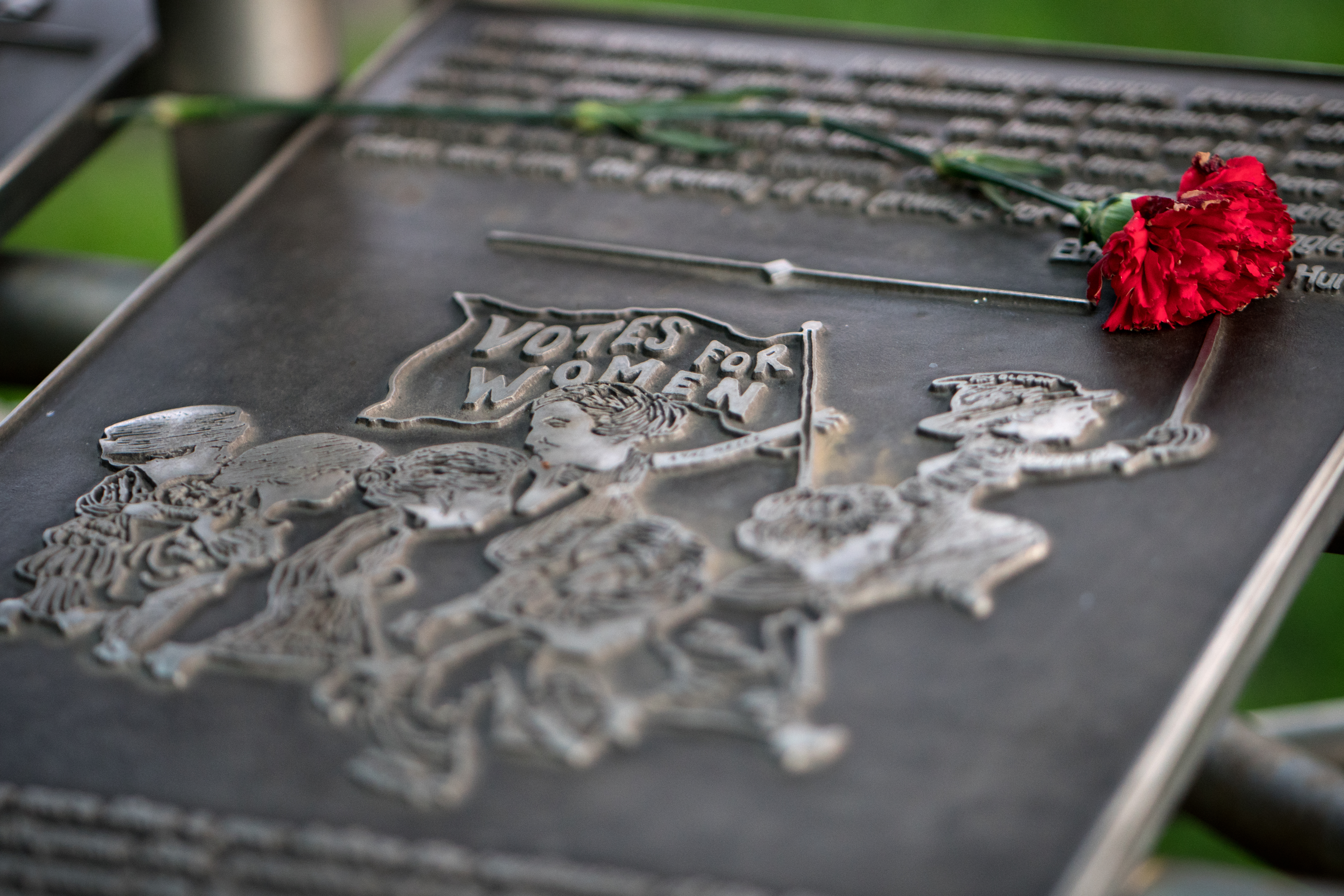

== See also ==
- List of monuments and memorials to women's suffrage

== Works cited ==
- Bauer, Heidi, ed. (1999). The Privilege for Which We Struggled: Leaders of the Woman Suffrage Movement in Minnesota. St. Paul, Minnesota: Upper Midwest Women's History Center. ISBN 978-0914227106.
- Stanton, Elizabeth Cady; Anthony, Susan B.; Gage, Matilda Joslyn, eds. (1886). "Minnesota". History of Woman Suffrage, Volume III. Fowler & Wells. pp. 649–661.
