= Jenova Martin =

Norwegian suffragist and writer (1866–1937)

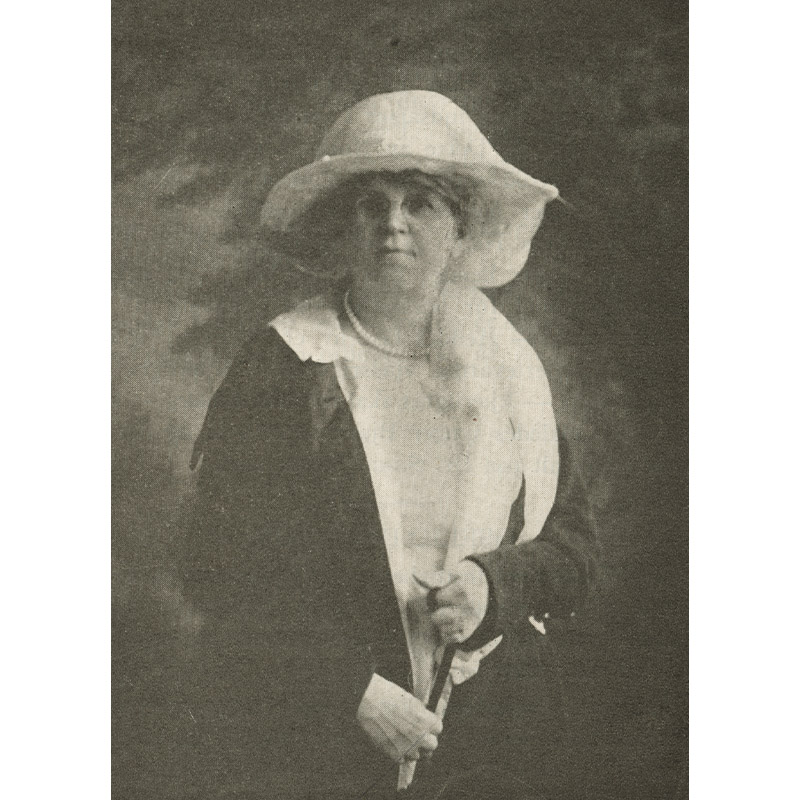
- Jenova Martin in 1927
- Born: 1866; Norway
- Died: March 5, 1937; Hennepin County, Minnesota
- Writing career
- Pen name: Mistocles
- Notable work: Zoharita

Jenova Martin (1866 – March 5, 1937) was a Norwegian-born American suffragist and writer. She was one of the founders of the Scandinavian Voting Association and from 1907 to 1913, she was the first president of the Scandinavian Woman Suffrage Association (SWSA), which fought for universal suffrage in Minnesota and the United States.

== Early and personal life ==
Not much is known about Jenova Martin's early life. It is known that she was born in Norway and emigrated from Oslo to the United States in 1882. She is said to have been married, however her husband's name is unknown. She had a daughter.

== Campaigning for women's suffrage ==
Martin was one of the founders of the Scandinavian Voting Association. From 1907 to 1914, Martin took an active part in the campaign for American women's suffrage. When the Scandinavian Woman Suffrage Association was founded in 1907 by Ethel Edgerton Hurd, Martin became its first president, a role she held from 1907 to 1913. After her retirement, she was succeeded by suffragette Nanna Mattson Jaeger.

While she was president of the SWSA, Martin placed a large focus on the association's ethnicity. By looking at all the Scandinavian immigrant group (Norwegian, Swedish and Danish) as a whole, the membership would surpass all Scandinavian individual groups. As a Norwegian, Martin recruited many other Norwegians through various Norwegian cultural events, such as plays, speeches and lobbying campaigns. She was concerned with preserving the Scandinavian cultural heritage, in contrast with her successor Jaeger who championed the assimilation into American populace. In 1913, Martin told the Minneapolis Tribune that Scandinavian women in Minneapolis "had no interest in woman suffrage" as Scandinavians in this country have been so busy making money that they are 50 years behind the times", a statement she retracted two days later with an explanation.

Martin gave speeches in both Norwegian and English while garnering support for women's rights. When Minnesota's neighbouring state of North Dakota prepared to vote on a women's suffrage amendment to the state constitution, Martin travelled there to give speeches in both languages and to advise local suffragettes. Her most famous speech was The Great Awakening, which she delivered at the annual meeting of the Minnesota Woman Suffrage Association in 1908.

Between 1909 and 1922, Martin often contributed editorials to newspapers such as the Star Tribune and Minneapolis Star, expressing her progressive ideas. Martin also was a part of several clubs such as the Progressive Literary Club.

== Later life ==
After leaving the SWSA in 1913, Martin shifted her focus onto the socialist movement. She wrote and lectured on these subjects as well as focusing more on her writing, and spent less time on the suffrage movement after 1914.

In 1917, she published the play Zoharita under the pseudonym Mistocles.

Martin died on March 5, 1937, in Hennepin County, Minnesota, at the age of 71.
