= Ozora P. Stearns =

American politician (1831–1896)

Ozora Pierson Stearns
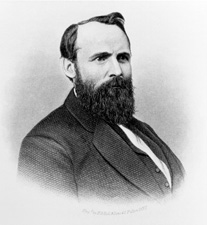

United States Senator from Minnesota
- In office January 23, 1871 – March 3, 1871
- Preceded by: William Windom
- Succeeded by: William Windom

Mayor of Rochester, Minnesota
- In office 1866–1868
- Preceded by: J. V. Daniels
- Succeeded by: Daniel Heaney

County Attorney of Olmsted County, Minnesota
- In office 1865–1866
- In office 1861–1862

Personal details
- Born: January 15, 1831 De Kalb, New York
- Died: June 2, 1896 (aged 65) Pacific Beach, California
- Party: Republican
- Spouse: Sarah Burger
- Education: Oberlin College; University of Michigan

Military service
- Allegiance: United States
- Branch/service: (United States) Union Army
- Rank: Colonel
- Battles/wars: American Civil War

Ozora Pierson Stearns (January 15, 1831 – June 2, 1896) was an American politician and attorney. A member of the Republican Party, he served as a U.S. senator from the state of Minnesota. Prior to his election to the Senate, he served as mayor of Rochester, Minnesota, and county attorney of Olmsted County. He was a Colonel in the Union Army during the American Civil War.

== Early years ==
Stearns was born January 15, 1831, in De Kalb, New York. He was the tenth of eleven children. In 1833, the Stearns family moved to Madison, Ohio.

== Education ==
Stearn attended Oberlin College, graduated from the University of Michigan in 1858, and from the law department of that university in 1860. He was admitted to the bar in 1860 and commenced practice in Rochester, Minnesota.

== Career ==
Stearns was elected prosecuting attorney of Olmsted County, Minnesota, in 1861, formed a law partnership with Charles M. Start in 1863, and served as mayor of Rochester from 1866 to 1868.

He served in the Union Army during the Civil War as a first lieutenant in the 9th Minnesota Volunteer Infantry Regiment and later as colonel of the 39th United States Colored Infantry. He led the latter regiment at the Battle of the Crater on July 30, 1864.

Stearns was elected as a Republican to the United States Senate from Minnesota on January 18, 1871, to fill the vacancy caused by the death of Daniel S. Norton. He served in the 41st Congress from January 23, 1871, to March 3, 1871.

In 1872, Stearns moved to Duluth and formed a law partnership with J. D. Ensign (future mayor of Duluth). Governor Cushman Kellogg Davis appointed Stearns as a judge of the eleventh judicial district of Minnesota in 1874. He was re-elected three times, serving until 1895. According to Stearns, when he began as a judge, "there was not a court-house in the district. We held court where we could— in churches, in stores, school-houses, and sometimes in places not quite so respected."

Stearns also served as a regent of the University of Minnesota (1890–1895), president and treasurer of the Lakeside Land company, director in the West Duluth Land company, the Duluth Electric Light and Power company, the Masonic Temple association, the Duluth Building and Loan association and the Duluth Union National bank.

== Personal life ==
Stearns married Sarah Burger Stearns, the first president of the Minnesota Woman Suffrage Association. In 1891, he suffered a stroke, and they moved to California in 1894 because of his failing health. He died in Pacific Beach, California, on June 2, 1896. His remains were cremated in Los Angeles, California, and the ashes interred in Forest Hill Cemetery, Duluth, Minnesota.

U.S. Senate
| Preceded by William Windom | U.S. senator (Class 2) from Minnesota; 1871; Served alongside: Alexander Ramsey | Succeeded by William Windom |
Political offices
| Preceded by Unknown | Mayor of Rochester, Minnesota; 1866–1868 | Succeeded by Unknown |
