= 1875 Minnesota Amendment 2 =

1875 Minnesota Amendment 2 was a legislatively referred constitutional amendment, which amended article seven of the Minnesota Constitution to allow women's suffrage in school affairs. The measure appeared on the ballot of Minnesotan voters on November 2, 1875. It was accepted by 55.56% of voters.

The amendment allowed women to vote in matters relating to school affairs, and allowing women to hold public office for the purpose school management.

The act passed by the legislature read as follows:

The following amendment to article seven (7) of the constitution of the state of Minnesota, which amendment shall be termed section eight (8) of said article, is hereby proposed to the people of said state for their approval or Pertaining to rejection, which section shall read as follows : The legislature may, notwithstanding anything in this article, provide by law, that any woman at the age of twenty-one years and upward, may vote at any election held for the purpose of choosing any officers of schools, or upon any measure relating to schools, and may also provide that any such woman shall be eligible to hold any office pertaining solely to the management of schools.

== Results ==
Minnesota Amendment 2 Amendment to article seven (7) of the constitution
Choice	Votes	%
For	24,340	55.56
Against	19,468	44.44
Total	43,808	100.00

== See also ==
- Women's suffrage in Minnesota
