= Uwland =

Uwland is a surname. Notable people with the surname include:

- Bodhi Uwland (born 2003), Australian footballer
- Zeke Uwland (born 2007), Australian footballer

== See also ==
- Ueland, surname
