= Sarah Burger Stearns =

American suffragist (1836–1904)

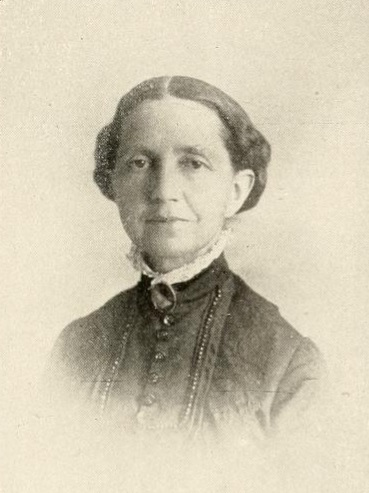
- Born: Sarah Burger; November 30, 1836; New York City, New York, US
- Died: October 26, 1904 (aged 67); Los Angeles, California, US
- Occupations: Social reformer and suffragist
- Known for: Co-founding the Minnesota Woman Suffrage Association
- Spouse: Ozora P. Stearns

Sarah Burger Stearns (November 30, 1836 – October 26, 1904) was a social reformer and a leader in the woman's suffrage movement in the U.S. state of Minnesota. She co-founded the Minnesota Woman Suffrage Association and served as its first president.

== Early life and education ==
Sarah Burger was born in New York City on November 30, 1836. In 1845, her family moved to Ann Arbor, Michigan, and later, to Cleveland, Ohio.

Burger attended a national suffrage convention in Cleveland at age 14 where she heard talks by Lucretia Mott, Lucy Stone, and other national leaders. In 1858, she organized twelve young women to make the first formal application, by women, for admission to the University of Michigan in Ann Arbor. The reply they received was "It seems inexpedient, at present, for the University to admit ladies". Discussion continued until 1869 when women (but not Stearns) were admitted.

Stearns accepted a position as a Greek and Latin teacher in an academy. After a year, she applied to University of Michigan again and was, again, refused. She entered and graduated from the State Normal School in Ypsilanti, Michigan.

In 1863, she married Lieutenant Ozora P. Stearns whom she had met five years earlier. After marriage, while he was in the army, Sarah was preceptress in a seminary for young women in Monroe, Michigan. She also lectured for the benefit of the Soldiers' Aid Societies and the Sanitary Commission. She was invited to give a lecture to the Theodore Parker Fraternity (a social and religious society) in Boston; her lecture was titled, "Wrongs of Women and Their Redress". She also taught Freedmen where her husband (now Colonel Stearns) was stationed.

== Women's suffrage in Minnesota ==
In 1866, the Stearnses moved from Michigan to Rochester, Minnesota, and Sarah continued to give lectures on subjects such as "Woman and Home" and "Woman and the Republic," and wrote newspaper articles on education.

Stearns and Mary Colburn (and "friends of equality") petitioned the legislature for an amendment to strike the word male from the section of the Minnesota State Constitution which enfranchised "every male person," as a means to provide women with the right to vote. Stearns and Colburn were given a hearing before a legislative committee in 1867 but, ultimately, the bill failed in committee (by a majority of one) and no action was taken.

In 1869, Susan B. Anthony traveled through the Midwest encouraging women to form local affiliates of the National Woman Suffrage Association. After her visit, Stearns and Colburn formed the first suffrage societies in Minnesota: Stearns in Rochester with 50 members and Colburn in Champlin.

The Stearnses moved to Duluth, Minnesota, in 1872. Sarah organized another suffrage society, the Duluth Woman Suffrage Circle, and served as its president from 1881 to 1893. She supported temperance, served as a member of the Duluth school board for three years, and was the Minnesota vice-president for the Association for the Advancement of Women for several years. Stearns was characterized in a local newspaper as "a power in the young community [Duluth] as well as in the state of Minnesota".

In 1875, the Minnesota constitution was amended to allow women of 21 years or older to vote in "any election held for the purpose of choosing any officers of schools, or upon any measure relating to schools, and may also provide that any such woman shall be eligible to hold any office pertaining solely to the management of school". Stearns, and other supporters, made no effort to campaign for votes in favor of the amendment because they were afraid that those efforts would simply rouse the opposition. Shortly before the election, Stearns contacted the editor of the St. Paul Pioneer Press to request support in his paper; the editor admitted that he had forgotten all about the amendment. Stearns and her colleagues persuaded both political parties to phrase the ballot, "For the amendment of Article VII relating to electors–Yes". In order to vote against the amendment, voters had to cross out Yes and write in No. The amendment passed 24,340 to 19,468. As Stearns later stated, "our bitterest opponents forgot the question was to be voted upon, and the ignorant classes who could not, or did not read their ballots, voted unthinkingly for the measure". After passage of the amendment, Stearns spoke at women's meetings, informing them of their new rights and campaigning for two female candidates from Minneapolis.

Stearns was the vice-president from Minnesota for the National Woman Suffrage Association for several years, and hosted Susan B. Anthony when Anthony visited Duluth.

When an amendment to allow women to vote on matters relating to prohibition was voted down in 1877, Stearns and other woman leaders became convinced that a statewide organization was needed to move women's issues forward. Fourteen women met in Hastings, Minnesota, in 1881, and formed the Minnesota Woman Suffrage Association (MWSA). (Note: The charter members of the MWSA were: "Mrs. Harriet E. Bishop, Mrs. Martha Luly, St. Paul; Mrs. A. T. Anderson, Mrs. H. J. Moffit, Mrs. C. Smith, Minneapolis; Mrs. Harriet A. Hobart, Julia Bullard Nelson, Mrs. R. Coons, Red Wing; Sarah Burger Stearns, Duluth; Mrs. L. C. Clarke, Worthington; Mrs. L. G. Finen, Albert Lea; Mrs. K. E. Webster, Mrs. Minnie Reed, Mrs. M. A. VanHoesen, Hastings".) Stearns became the first president. The association grew to 124 in its first year and doubled in number in the second year.

In 1882, Stearns was unanimously re-elected as president of the MWSA at its first annual meeting. In 1883, she stepped down due to ill health but accepted presidency of the Equal Rights League in Duluth.

== Other activities ==
Stearns played a vital role in the organization of a home for destitute women and children in 1885, which eventually developed into the Duluth Children's Home, and served as president of the society that maintained the home. After five or six years, a new home was built on property donated by two judges (Stearn's husband and Judge Ensign). The funds to build the home were donated by members of the society.

== Last years and legacy ==
In 1894, the Stearnses moved to California for Ozora's health. Sarah was chair of the Los Angeles Suffrage League in 1900, and she continued to work for women's rights until her death on January 26, 1904. In her obituary, Stearns is called "one of the most prominent platform orators in the cause of woman suffrage and temperance".

In 1996, a memorial garden was built on the grounds of the Minnesota State Capitol, to observe the 75th anniversary of the suffrage movement. The garden exhibit is called Garden of Time: Landscape of Change, and is planted with native flowers and grasses. A monument in the garden lists the names of 25 women active in the movement, including Stearns.

== See also ==
- Timeline of women's suffrage in the United States
- List of suffragists and suffragettes
