= Harriet Duncan Hobart =

American schoolteacher and women's rights advocate

Harriet Duncan Hobart (1825–1898) was an American schoolteacher and women's rights advocate. After teaching in New York City, she moved to Minnesota and became an advocate for temperance and women's suffrage. She was president of the Minnesota Woman's Christian Temperance Union (WCTU) for thirteen years and urged the WCTU to work on behalf of women's rights more broadly.

== Early life ==
Harriet A. Duncan, born in the north of Ireland in 1825, immigrated to the United States and arrived in New York City in 1843. She became a successful teacher, working in classrooms for twenty-five years. She also doubled as a principal for fifteen of those years.

In April 1868, Duncan moved to Red Wing, Minnesota, to marry a recently widowed Methodist Episcopal churchman, Chauncey Hobart. Chauncey was born in St. Albans, Vermont, on June 9, 1811. He served as a soldier in the American Indian Wars of 1831–1832. In 1836, Hobart joined the Illinois conference of the Methodist Episcopal Church and worked as an itinerant preacher in Illinois, Wisconsin, and Minnesota. He was chaplain of the House in the first Minnesota Territorial Legislature in 1849 and the Minnesota State Legislature in 1877. During the Civil War he was chaplain of the Third Minnesota Regiment. In 1885, he published Recollections of My Life: Fifty Years of Itinerancy in the Northwest.

== Temperance movement ==
Hobart became part of the Temperance movement in Minnesota. She took an active role in the 1874 Minnesota Woman's Christian Temperance Union (WCTU) convention in Red Wing. She was a speaker at the meeting, along with Julia Bullard Nelson and Elizabeth Hutchinson. These three WCTU leaders also believed women should have the right to vote, and argued successfully for a vote in support of women's suffrage.

In 1877, Hobart helped to organize the local Red Wing Woman's Christian Temperance Union. She became president and continued in that role for thirteen years. Her tenure as president was the longest in the group's history.

Hobart's 1891 speech before the Minnesota WCTU's Fifteenth Convention argued for women's rights broadly. She and other leaders were widening the scope of their organization. Some critics within the WCTU felt such efforts were a sideshow that weakened the struggle against liquor. But Hobart believed strongly in women's equality. Hobart, like many of her WCTU sisters, believed that getting the vote would empower women and eventually bring about equal rights. This strength would help them in their war on intoxicating beverages.

During her 1892 presidential address before the WCTU, Hobart told of the Union's power to influence others. She told members to share their views about regulation of the liquor traffic with every man they dealt with-husbands, brothers, sons, friends, merchants, and workmen.

== Death ==
Hobart died in 1898 at age 74.
