= Ripley Memorial Hospital =

- Maternity Hospital
- U.S. National Register of Historic Places
- Minneapolis Landmark
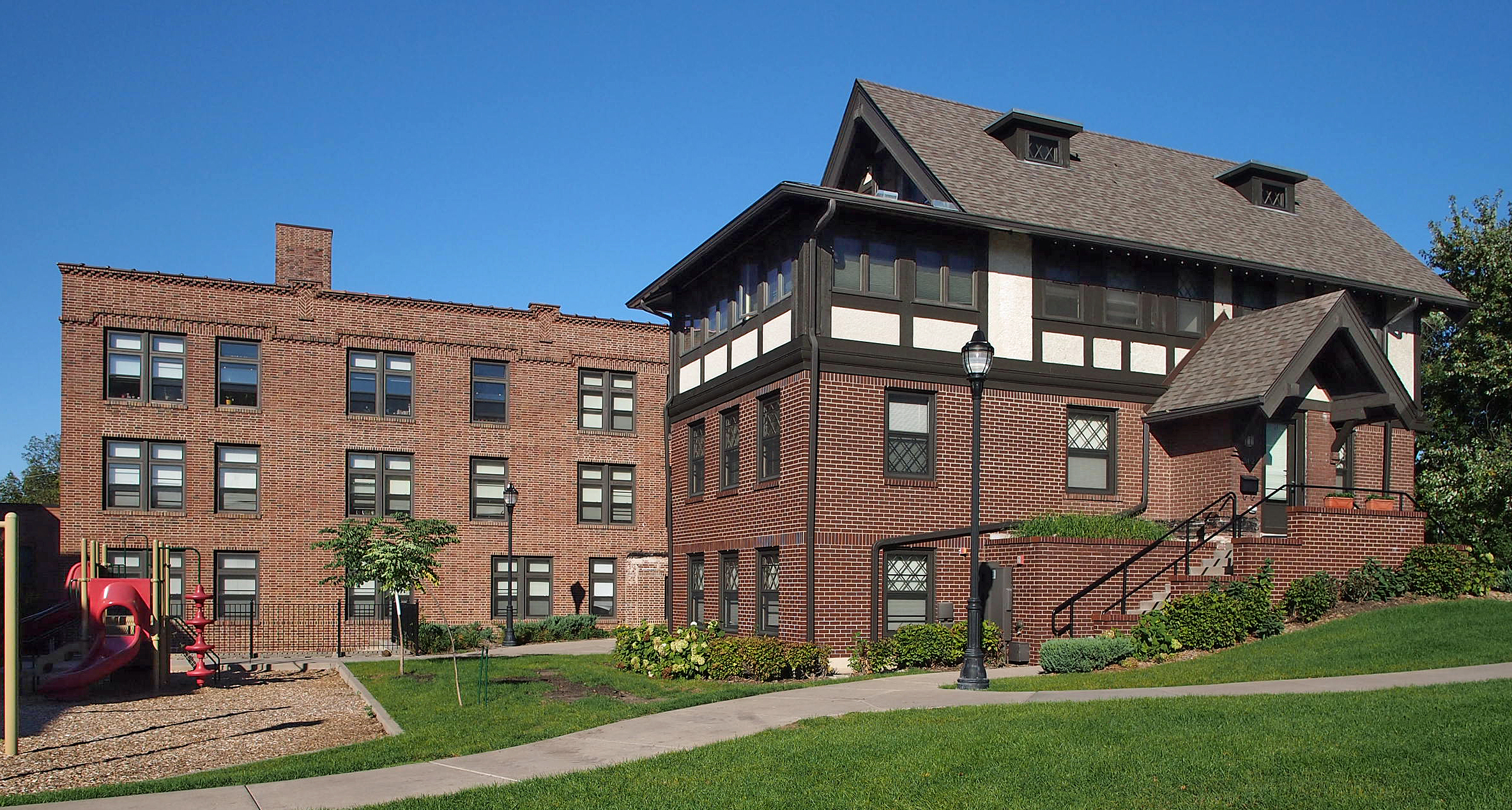
- Two buildings of the former Ripley Memorial Hospital

- Location within Minnesota Location within the United States
- Location: 300 Queen Ave., N., Minneapolis, Minnesota
- Coordinates: 44°58′49″N 93°18′32″W
- Built: 1910
- Architectural style: Late 19th And 20th Century Revivals, Tudor Revival
- NRHP reference No.: 80002069

Significant dates
- Added to NRHP: March 27, 1980
- Designated MPLSL: 1986

Maternity Hospital, also known as Ripley Memorial Hospital and currently known as Ripley Gardens, is a former hospital building in the Harrison neighborhood of Minneapolis, Minnesota. The hospital was established by Dr. Martha Ripley in 1886 in response to the exceptionally high mortality rates for women in childbirth. Dr. Ripley was one of only a few female physicians in the late 19th century, and she employed only women as physicians and board members. The hospital provided services for primarily poor, unmarried, and widowed women. The hospital was originally located in a house at 316 15th Street South, but it quickly outgrew that house and moved to 2529 4th Avenue South. Demand continued to grow, so in 1896 the hospital purchased a house on 5 acres (2.0 ha) of land at the corner of Glenwood and Penn Avenues. The hospital built the Marshall Stacy Nursery in 1909, followed by the Babies' Bungalow in 1910 and the Emily Paddock Cottage in 1911. Also in 1911, Ripley appealed to the government for funds to build an even larger building. Ripley died on April 18, 1912, of a respiratory infection.

In 1916, the new building was completed. The hospital was renamed from Maternity Hospital to Ripley Memorial Hospital at that time. The hospital served the community until 1957, when it was closed due to low occupancy and funding problems. The hospital building was sold to Children's Hospital of Minneapolis, and the remaining funds were used to establish the Ripley Memorial Foundation. The foundation has sponsored teenage pregnancy prevention programs since 1993. The former hospital buildings were listed on the National Register of Historic Places in 1980.

The building was redeveloped in 2007 by Aeon, a Minneapolis organization that provides affordable housing. The development, now known as Ripley Gardens, provides housing for low- to moderate-income residents, and provides both rental housing and home ownership opportunities. The redevelopment was one of twelve properties around the nation funded by the Restore America program, sponsored by the National Trust for Historic Preservation and HGTV.
