= Brenda Ueland =

American journalist and writer (1891–1985)

- Portrait of Brenda Ueland, c. 1930
- Born: October 24, 1891; Minneapolis, Minnesota
- Died: March 5, 1985 (aged 93); Minneapolis, Minnesota
- Parent: Clara Hampson Ueland

Brenda Ueland (October 24, 1891 – March 5, 1985) was an American journalist, editor, freelance writer, and teacher of writing. She is best known for her book If You Want to Write: A Book about Art, Independence and Spirit.

== Early life and education ==
Brenda was born in Minneapolis, Minnesota, to Andreas and Clara Hampson Ueland. She was the third of seven children. She attended Wells and Barnard colleges and received her baccalaureate from Barnard in 1913. Brenda was raised in a relatively progressive household; her father, an immigrant from Norway, was a prominent lawyer and judge. Her mother was a suffragette and served as the first president of the Minnesota League of Women Voters. Brenda would spend her life as a staunch feminist and is said to have lived by two rules: To tell the truth, and to not do anything she didn't want to.

== Career ==
=== Print media and radio ===
Brenda Ueland had a varied and prolific career. She freelanced for many publications including the Saturday Evening Post, Ladies Home Journal, Golfer and Sportsman, and varied newspapers. She was a staff writer for Liberty and the Minneapolis Times, among other publications. She worked for two years (1915–1917) as an editor for Crowell Publishing in New York City.

Brenda wrote scripts for radio shows including a program entitled Tell Me More, which featured Ueland responding to listener's personal problems, and Stories for Girl Heroes, a children's program about notable women. She also taught many local writing classes starting in 1934. In 1946, while covering the treason trials of Vidkun Quisling, she was awarded the Knight of Royal Norwegian Order of St. Olaf by the Norwegian government.

=== Books ===
Ueland published two books during her life. The first was If You Want to Write: A Book about Art, Independence and Spirit, first published in 1938. In this book, she shares her philosophies on writing and life in general. She stresses the idea that "Everyone is talented, original, and has something important to say." Drawing heavily on the work and influence of William Blake, she suggests that writers should "Try to discover your true, honest, un-theoretical self." She sums up her book with 12 points to keep in mind while writing. Carl Sandburg called If You Want to Write "the best book ever written on how to write." It was republished in 1983 by the Schubert Club of St. Paul, Minnesota, and then picked up by Graywolf Press, for which it remains their bestselling title.

Her second book was an autobiography entitled Me: A Memoir, published in 1939. In it she writes about her childhood, time in college, her life in Greenwich Village, and love affairs, among other topics. She tells of her affair with Raoul Hendricson, an anarchist who eventually left her for Isadora Duncan. This book was reprinted in 1994 and published by Holy Cow! Press (Duluth, Minnesota). Libby Larsen composed a song cycle using texts from this memoir.

In 1992, a collection of Ueland's writing from her last four decades was published by Holy Cow! Press of Duluth, under the name Strength to Your Sword Arm. It included articles and essays on topics such as children, feminism, her life in Minneapolis, animals, and health and well-being.

In 1998, a chapbook was released by Kore Press with her essay Tell Me More: On the Fine Art of Listening. This was a part of a series of booklets of short essays that was designed to be sent in the mail like a greeting card, and it came with an envelope for that purpose.

Though it was not published in Brenda's lifetime, in the 1950s she began writing a biography of her mother. It was finally published under the name O Clouds, Unfold: Clara Ueland and Her Family in 2003.

== Later life ==
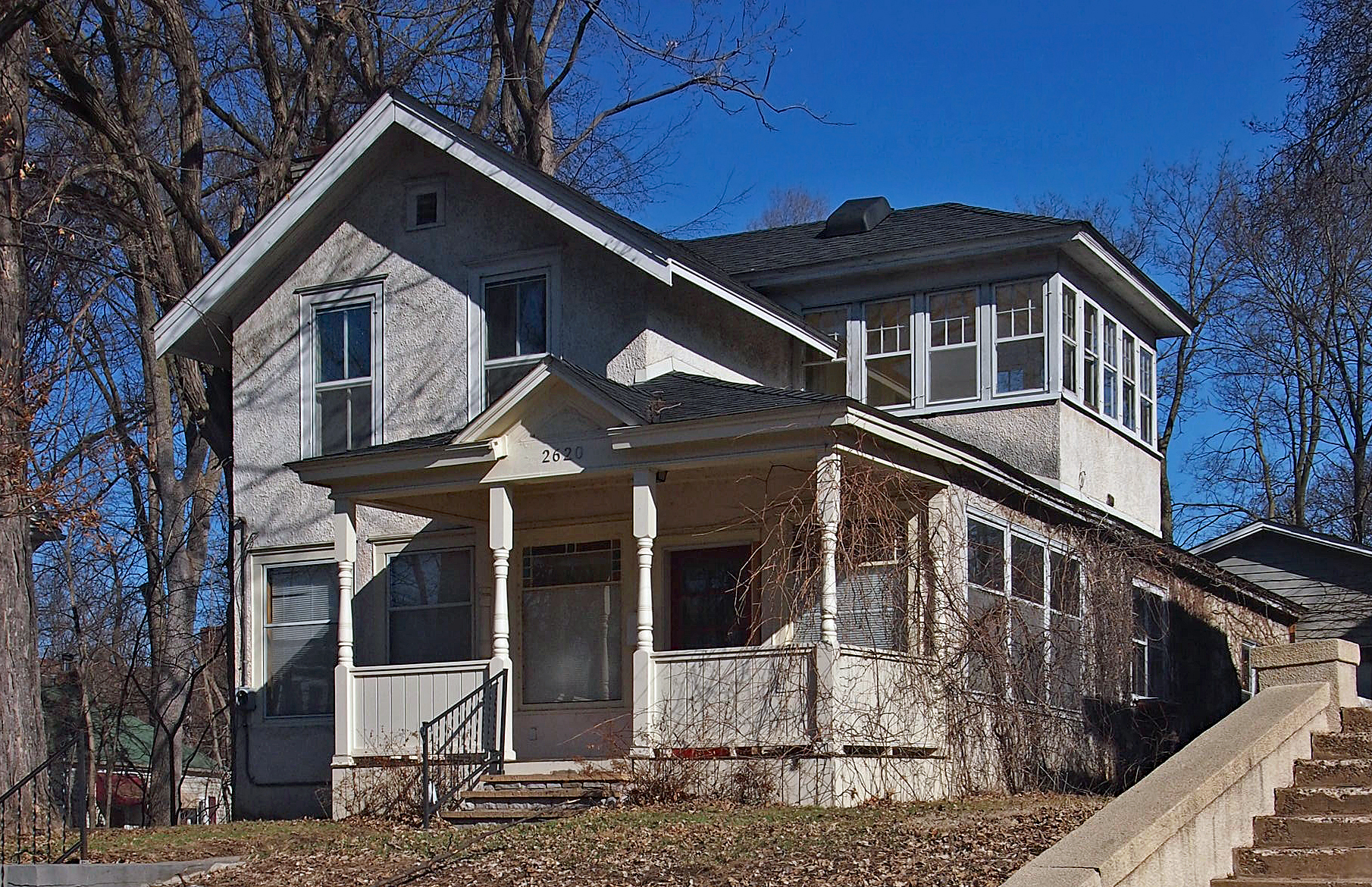
Brenda Ueland's home in Minneapolis, circa 2017, where she lived from 1954 to her death in 1985.

She lived in and around New York City for much of her adult life before returning to Minnesota in 1930. Brenda was concerned with animal welfare and regularly spoke out against vivisection. She worked with Pet Haven, Inc, a no-kill animal shelter based in Minnesota that was established in 1952. Brenda was very physically active well into her old age. She regularly walked up to 9 miles a day, and liked to spend time improving her handstands. She enjoyed swimming and set an international swimming record for people over 80 years old. She died at the age of 93 on March 5, 1985.

== Personal life ==
By her own account, Ueland had many lovers. She was married three times. Her first marriage was to William Benedict in 1916. This marriage resulted in the birth of her only child, a daughter named Gabrielle in 1921. Brenda and William divorced in 1926 and she raised Gabrielle on her own. She went on to marry two more times, first to Manus McFadden, the editor of the Minneapolis Times, then to Sverre Hanssen, a Norwegian artist. Both marriages resulted in divorce. She is the step-grandmother of Eric Utne, founder of the Utne Reader.
