= Julia Bullard Nelson =

American suffragist (1842–1914)

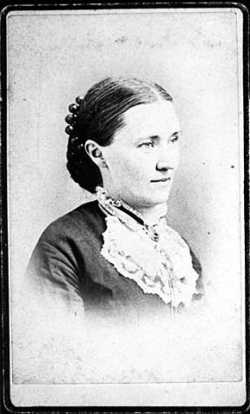
- Julia B. Nelson, c. 1866
- Born: Julia Bullard; May 3, 1842; High Ridge, Connecticut
- Died: December 24, 1914 (aged 72)
- Education: Hamline University
- Occupations: Educator, Social Reformer, Suffragist
- Spouse: Ole Nelson (m. 1866–1868) his death

Julia Bullard Nelson (1842–1914) was an American temperance and women's rights activist from Red Wing, Minnesota. Following the death of her husband and their only child, she went south to Texas, in 1869, to teach former slaves in U.S. government-backed Freedmen's Bureau schools. Nelson spent the summers of the 1870s and 1880s in Minnesota, where she emerged as a state and national leader in the movement for women's suffrage and the temperance campaign against alcohol use.

== Early life and education ==
Julia Bullard was born in High Ridge, Connecticut, on May 13, 1842, the daughter of Edward and Angeline Raymond Bullard. Julia Bullard moved to Minnesota with her family in 1857. She earned a teaching degree at Hamline University, which was then located in Red Wing, around 1862.

== Adult life and career ==
=== Family tragedy ===
In September 1866, Bullard married former classmate Ole Nelson. Tragedy struck the Nelson family when their infant son, Cyrus, died in August 1867. Just five months later, Ole died. Newly widowed, the twenty-six-year-old teacher decided to put her teaching skills to use for a greater cause by educating newly-freed slaves in the South.

=== Social activism ===
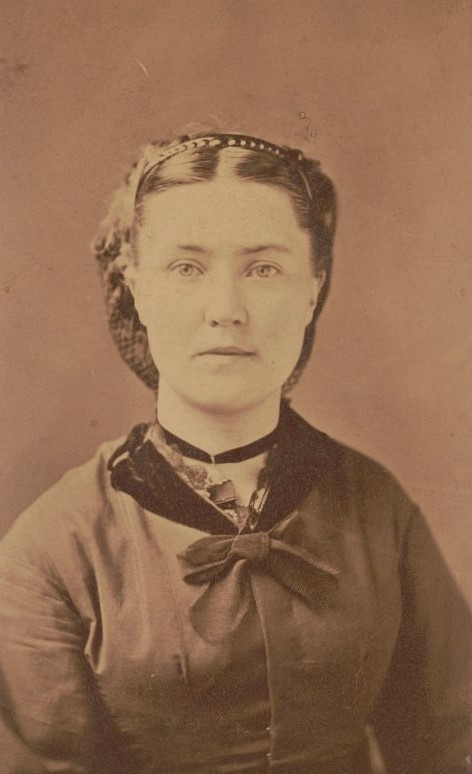
Portrait of Julia Bullard Nelson in Galveston, Texas, c. 1869.

In 1869, Nelson traveled to Texas, which was a perilous endeavor, where she would teach freed slaves through the Freedmen's Bureau. Congress had created the Freedmen's Bureau to assist newly-freed slaves in adjusting to their release following the Civil War. By 1869, there were about three thousand schools for freed men and women, including the one at which Nelson taught.

Most Southern whites, angry at their defeat during the Civil War (1861–1865), deeply resented teachers from the North. Although she was threatened with violence and shunned by some whites, Nelson taught in the South from 1870 until 1888.

In the early 1880s, Nelson, a member of the Minnesota Woman's Christian Temperance Union (WCTU), assumed duty as a public speaker for the group. In 1886, while part of a delegation to a U.S. House of Representatives judiciary committee hearing woman suffrage, Nelson stated, "If I am capable of preparing citizens, I am capable of possessing the rights of a citizen myself. I ask you to remove the barriers which restrain women from equal opportunities and privileges with men."

Nelson also worked as superintendent for the Minnesota WCTU and was its vice president from 1889–1890. She handled editing the group's newspaper, the Minnesota White Ribboner.

"Julia B." made good use of summers free from teaching duty. In 1881, she joined fourteen other women, including Dr. Martha George Ripley and Sarah Burger Stearns, in forming the Minnesota Woman Suffrage Association (MWSA). The MWSA led the state effort to allow women to vote, a right denied them when the United States was formed. An excellent public speaker, Nelson became one of the group's most sought-after orators. She became a paid lecturer for the National Woman Suffrage Association. Nelson, now a Red Wing resident, served as MWSA president from 1890 to 1896.

President Nelson allied the MWSA with Ignatius Donnelly in 1893. Donnelly, a well-known Minnesota politician and famed orator, believed in a woman's right to vote. Nelson, Donnelly, and their allies, persuaded the Minnesota Senate to consider a suffrage amendment to the constitution. By a thirty-two to nineteen margin, the Senate voted to drop the word "male" from voting requirement language. But the bill did not become a law, because the House, under time constraints, did not vote on it. The MWSA continued to bring their amendment before future legislatures without success.

Her heavy schedule convinced Nelson to recruit twenty-one-year-old Jeremiah Patterson, a freed slave and former student, to run her Belvidere farm south of Red Wing. Patterson became part of the community. He married Verna Gaylord and moved to Red Wing. In spring 1897, Nelson and Patterson opened the Equal Rights Meat Market. This black–white business partnership, rare in Minnesota at this time, proved unsuccessful, but the Pattersons and their children continued to live in Red Wing. They stayed friends with Nelson.

== Later life and death ==
Julia B. Nelson continued her demanding work but by the winter of 1912, at age seventy-one, she was feeling the effects of bronchitis. In 1913, her physician suggested a long rest in Florida, and she followed his advice. But on her way south she stopped in Washington, D.C. to attend the national woman's suffrage convention. Nelson could not resist working, and in late fall 1914, started a strenuous train tour of North Dakota, working for women's voting rights. Weakened by this effort, Nelson died of pneumonia on December 24, 1914. A newspaper article reported she was "The Last of the Grand Old Women of Suffrage." Nelson left most of her estate to William H. Richards, a Black man, who she had adopted as her son.

== Legacy ==
Julie B. Nelson is an important historical figure in Texas and Minnesota history. Her home in Red Wing was added to the National Register of Historic Places, but it was torn down in 2004. Nelson was inducted into the Red Wing Women’s Hall of Fame in 2023.
