= Ethel Edgerton Hurd =

American physician and suffragist (1845–1929)

Ethel Edgerton Hurd (1845–1929) was a physician, a social reformer and a leader in the woman's suffrage movement in the U.S. state of Minnesota. She was a founder of the Political Equality Club of Minneapolis and the Scandinavian Woman Suffrage Association, and a member of the executive board of the Minnesota Woman Suffrage Association. For her activities, she was named to the national roll of honor of the League of Women Voters.

== Early life ==
Ethel Edgerton was born on August 11, 1845, in Galesburg, Illinois. Her father, Solomon Everest Edgerton (born 1818 in Essex County, New York) had moved to Galesburg in 1836 and, in 1942, married Martha L. Belding. The family moved to Woodhull, Illinois, in 1855. Ethel was the second of three daughters.

Ethel was the first woman to attend Knox College in Galesburg, Illinois. After graduation she worked as a schoolteacher. She married Captain Tyrus I. Hurd in Woodhull on February 22, 1865. They had two children: Addie and Anna (or Annah). The Hurds moved to Kansas in 1867 and then to Minnesota in 1897.

Tyrone Hurd's sister, Lucy Adaline Hurd, was married to William Cornelius Van Horne, president of the Canadian Pacific Railway.

== Medical practice ==
After her husband's death, Hurd earned a medical degree from University of Minnesota in 1897. She went into partnership with her daughter, Annah, working from an office in the Pillsbury building at 602 2nd Avenue South in Minneapolis, Minnesota. Hurd was active in social organizations, serving as an officer in the Medical Woman's Club, Minneapolis Medical Society, Minnesota State Homeopathic Institute, and Social Hygiene Committee. She lectured on social hygiene, eugenics, and social welfare. She stated, "Forget Shakespeare, Browning and Japan and take up the more important subject of the physical and mental welfare of the human race".

== Woman suffrage ==
Hurd began her suffrage activities in Kansas and continued after her move to Minnesota in 1897. She edited and printed the Minnesota Suffrage Bulletin for several years.

=== Political Equality Club of Minneapolis ===
Hurd was a leader of the Political Equality Club of Minneapolis, originally called the Woman Suffrage Club of Minneapolis. The club was founded in about 1868. It was the largest suffrage group in the Minneapolis area and the longest-lived woman's club that focused on equal rights and social reform. The club often met in the homes and offices of the members, including the medical offices of Hurd and her daughter. Hurd was president of the club twice; her second term was for the last 6 years before passage of the Nineteenth Amendment in 1920, when the club disbanded. Hurd said of the passage of the amendment, "It is a great satisfaction to live to see the end of so tremendous an undertaking."

=== Other suffrage activities ===
Hurd was a member of the executive board of the Minnesota Woman Suffrage Association (MWSA) from 1898 to 1919, with the exception of one year. She was part of an MWSA delegation who addressed Governor J. A. Johnson in 1906 stating "We ask the right of women suffrage as a matter of simple justice. I believe that until women take their right place in the legislation of justice, men will continue to suffer thru the laws which are enacted, and women will suffer further untold disabilities."

Hurd also helped form the Scandinavian Woman Suffrage Association in 1907 to take advantage of the lobbying power that the group would have in a heavily Scandinavian state. Its purpose was "for the social and economic advancement and to secure for the women of the State of Minnesota and of the United States the right of suffrage". She also formed the Workers' Equal Suffrage League in 1909. Both of these groups served to broaden the base of support for woman suffrage.

In 1918, Hurd published Woman suffrage in Minnesota : a record of the activities in its behalf since 1847.

Hurd was named posthumously to the national roll of honor of the League of Women Voters in 1929. A gavel given to Hurd in honor of her role was presented to the Minnesota League. The gavel came from Hurd's daughter Annah.

== Death ==
Hurd died on August 20, 1929, in St. Andrews, New Brunswick, Canada, while visiting relatives. She was buried with her husband in Lakewood Cemetery, Minneapolis, Minnesota.

== Bibliography ==
- Hurd, Ethel Edgerton (1916). Woman suffrage in Minnesota : a record of the activities in its behalf since 1847. Minneapolis: Inland Press.
- Hurd, Ethel Edgerton (February 19, 1920). "A Protectorate for Men". The Decatur Herald. p. 6.
