= Martha Ripley =

American physician

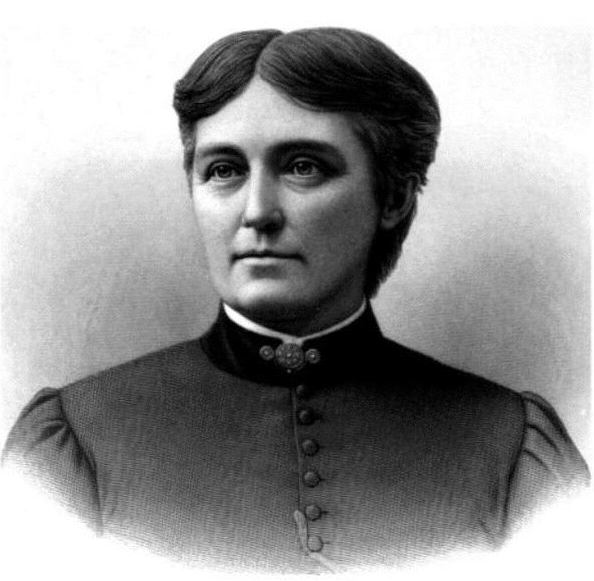
- Born: Martha George Rogers; November 30, 1843; Lowell, Vermont
- Died: April 18, 1912 (aged 68); Minneapolis, Minnesota
- Occupations: Physician, activist
- Spouse: William W. Ripley

Martha George Rogers Ripley (November 30, 1843 – April 18, 1912) was an American physician, suffragist, and professor of medicine. Founder of the Maternity Hospital in Minneapolis, Minnesota, Ripley was one of the most outspoken activists for disadvantaged female rights. A prominent leader in the American Woman Suffrage Association, Ripley also served six years as president of the Minnesota Woman Suffrage Association.

== Early years and personal life ==
Martha George Rogers was born November 30, 1843, in Lowell, Vermont, the oldest of five children of Esther Ann (George) and Francis Rogers, a stock farmer. The family moved to the Iowa frontier, where she attended high school (leaving without a diploma). She was awarded a first-class teacher's certificate and taught elementary school for a time. In 1867 she married rancher William Warren Ripley, son of a well-known Massachusetts mill-owning family. Shortly thereafter they moved back to his home state of Massachusetts, where he took up a job as manager of his uncle's paper mill in Lawrence. The couple had three daughters, Abigail, Clara, and Edna May. Within a few years, William had bought his own mill and moved the family to Middleton.

== Suffrage movement ==
Ripley joined the suffragists in 1875 and worked to establish an active suffrage group in Middleton, becoming close friends of Boston suffragettes Lucy Stone and Henry Browne Blackwell. The success of her efforts gained her a place in the statewide suffrage movement, and she was elected to both the central committee and the executive committee of the Massachusetts Woman Suffrage Association, serving in both capacities until 1883. It is known that Ripley was an excellent public speaker and often outspoken, leading her to be well-known and liked by many professional women and several doctors.

== Medical and public health career ==
Ripley's concern over the health issues facing women who worked in the Massachusetts textile mills prompted her to go to medical school. Ripley enrolled in 1880 at Boston University Medical School (from which one of her sisters had recently graduated) and earned her M.D. degree in 1883. Ripley was enrolled in the Homeopathy tradition rather than the male-dominated Allopathic medicine. That same year, her husband was badly injured in a mill accident and forced to retire from his mill business. Now dependent financially on Ripley's ability to earn a living, the couple moved to Minneapolis, Minnesota, where William had relatives and where a growing industrial sector offered scope for enterprising incomers.

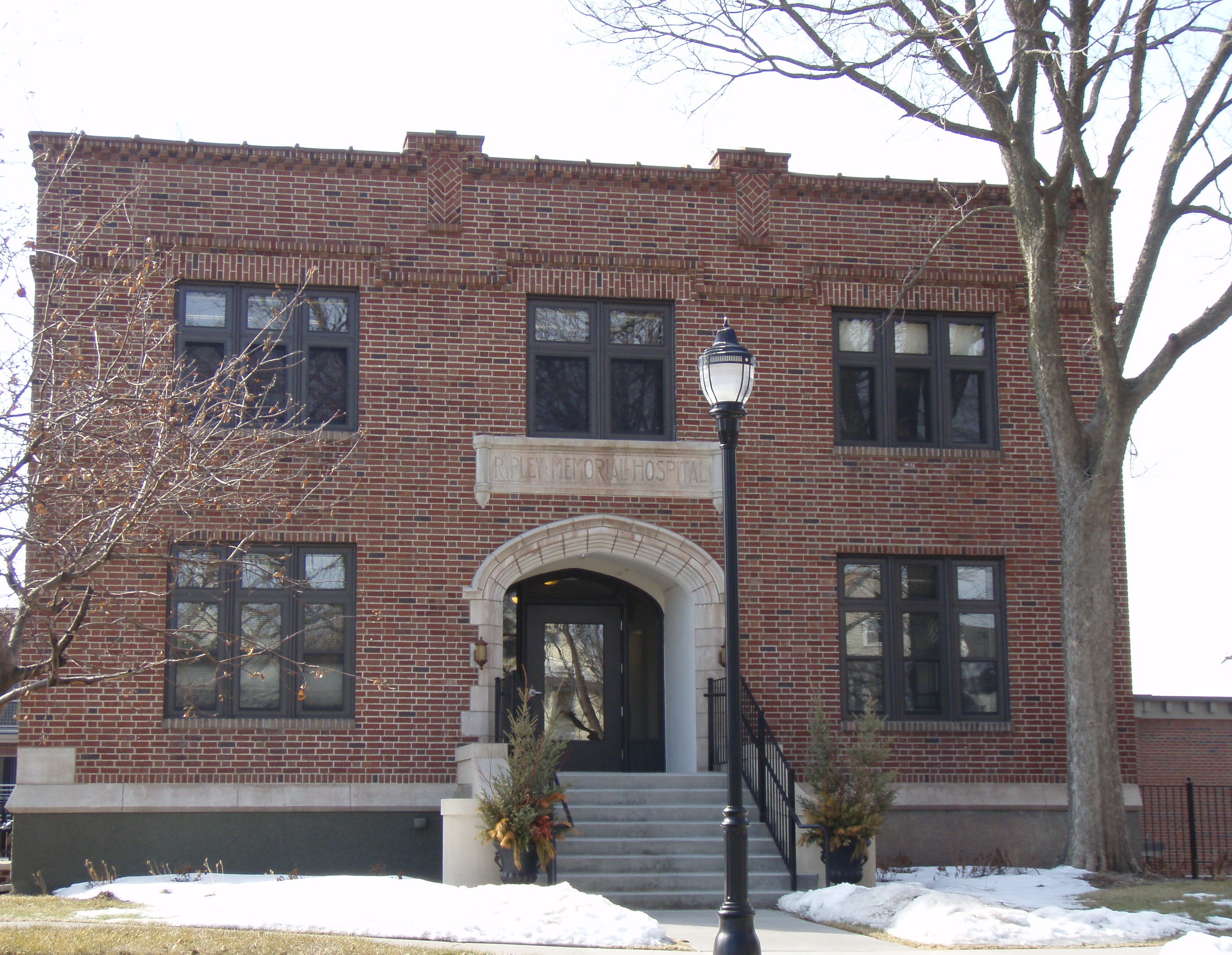
Maternity Hospital in 2008

With some difficulty, Ripley established a medical practice in Minneapolis and became a successful obstetrician. She received her license to practice in 1883, making her one of the first two dozen licensed women doctors in the state. The same year, Ripley was elected president of the Minnesota Woman Suffrage Association and through her considerable connections, brought the national convention of the American Woman Suffrage Association to Minneapolis in 1885. At one point, Ripley went so far as to personally petition the state senate for the right to vote.

During her six-year tenure as president, she often spoke out about public health issues such as city sanitation, clean water, food adulteration, and crowding of patients in hospitals. Ripley also promoted more matrons on the police force and women's involvement on the city board. She became an early advocate for cremation, on the grounds of both public health and reduced costs for the urban poor. After presidency, Ripley continued her involvement in association for an additional six years as a member of the association's medical board.

Amongst other discriminatory issues, until 1891, the age of consent was ten years old. In one of the many letters written to a Minneapolis editor, Ripley noted that the property of young girls was better protected by the state than their persons. Upon the adopting a law during the 26th Legislature of Minnesota in 1889 empowering fathers to deny rights to their unborn children, Ripley replied the bill to be "worthy of the Dark Ages". In the campaign of raising the age of consent for girls from 10 years old to 18 years old, Ripley partially succeeded when in 1891 the state legislature raised the age of consent to 14.

Like other women doctors of the time, Ripley found that most of her patients were women and young children who often had trouble accessing hospital care; for instance, no Minneapolis hospitals of the era would admit a pregnant woman who was unmarried. Ripley was inspired to start a new hospital run by and for women, especially women in economically straitened circumstances. Incorporated in 1887, her Maternity Hospital—later renamed Ripley Memorial Hospital—remained in operation until 1957, when it was closed due to low occupancy and funding problems. From its start in 1886, just three years after Ripley's graduation, Maternity Hospital quickly grew to a twenty-room facility and functioned "to provide a lying-in hospital" both for married women without means of adequate care and for "girls who have previously borne a good character" but "have been led astray." In 1896, the hospital moved to the corner of Western and Penn Avenue North, where it solidified its reputation through the lowest maternal death rates in the region and became the first Minneapolis hospital to establish a social service department.

Through Ripley's continued efforts, the hospital and her advocacies strengthened the suffragette movement in Minnesota with leaders such Frances Willard and Carrie Chapman Catt, who were often guests of Ripley's. Her activism was well known, respected, but often ridiculed. Ripley was also nominated director of public schools, but she was notably not elected due to her ineligibility as a female. Ripley was also a professor of children's diseases at the Homeopathic Medical College in Minnesota and was active in the Women's Rescue League, which aided prostitutes.

== Death and legacy ==
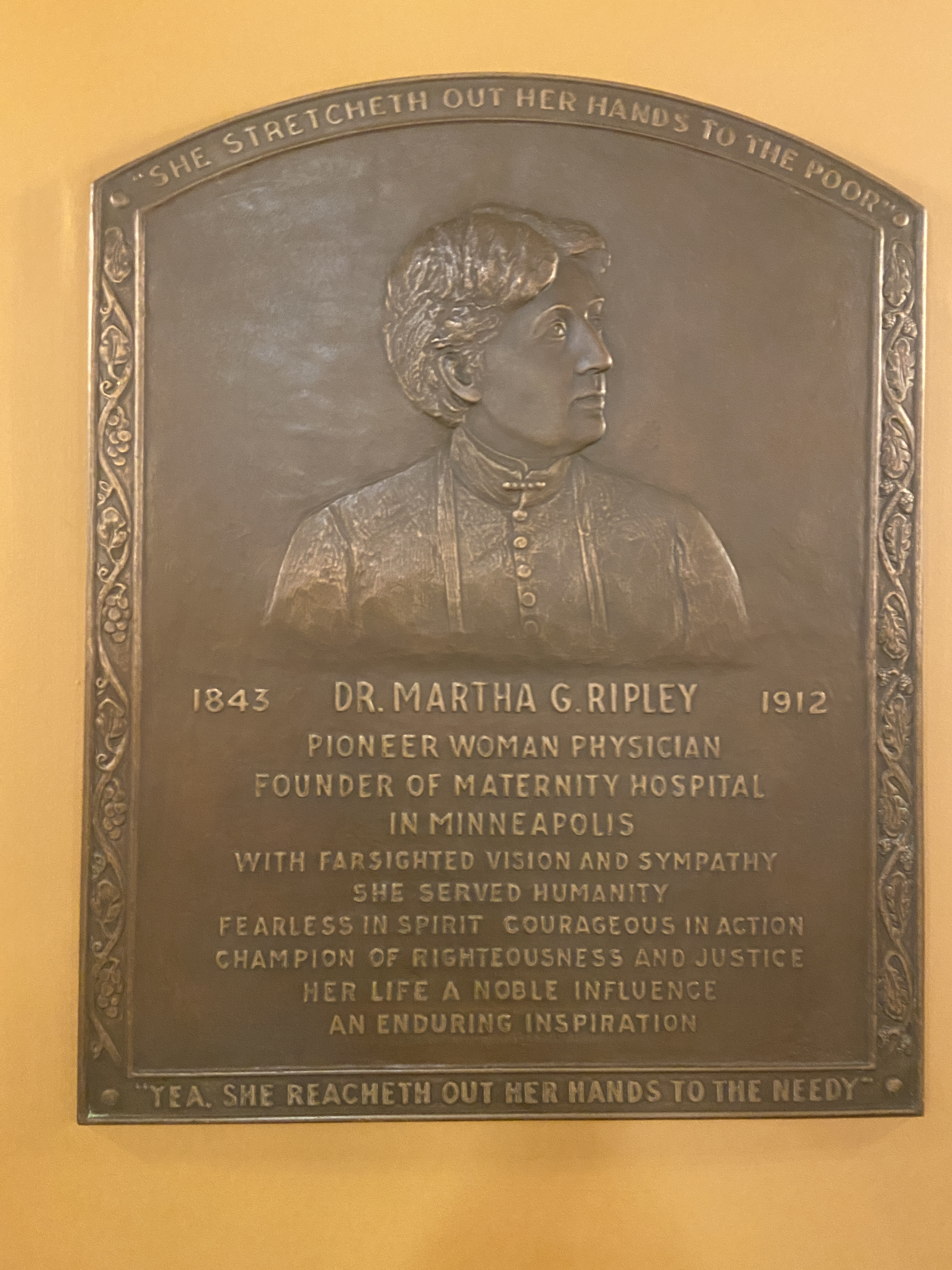
Minnesota State Capitol plaque

On April 18, 1912, Dr. Martha George Ripley died due to complications from a respiratory infection and rheumatic heart disease. In accordance with her own views, she was cremated. In 1939, a plaque honoring her as a pioneer woman physician and hospital founder was installed in the Minnesota state capitol building's rotunda.

Upon the closure of Maternity Hospital in 1957, the hospital structure was sold, and the proceeds were used to create the Ripley Memorial Foundation. Since 1993, the foundation has focused on supporting programs that prevent teenage pregnancies. In 2007, the hospital building was converted into apartments and renamed Ripley Gardens, a redevelopment funded in part by the National Trust for Historic Preservation. "Her ashes were eventually placed in the cornerstone (...)" of this current building. In the book, History of the City of Minneapolis, Minnesota " written before her death said, (...) she has proven herself friend of the friendless, the consoler of the sorrowing, the wise counselor and efficient helper of the unfortunate."
