= Minnesota Woman Suffrage Association =

American voting rights organization

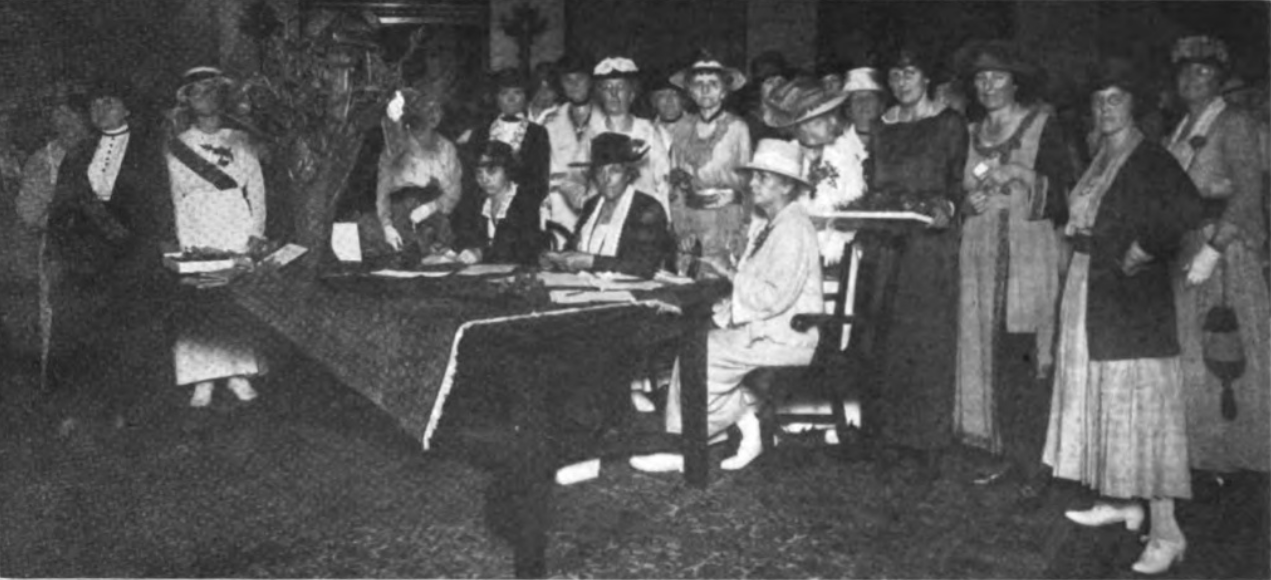
Ratification Day at Minnesota Woman Suffrage Association on September 8, 1919.

The Minnesota Woman Suffrage Association (MWSA) operated from 1881 to 1920. The organization was part of the broader women's suffrage movement in the United States and it sought to secure the right of women to vote in Minnesota. Its members organized marches, wrote petitions and letters, gathered signatures, gave speeches, and published pamphlets and broadsheets to compel the Minnesota Legislature to pass legislation that recognized their right to vote. As a result of the movement's efforts, the legislature ratified the Nineteenth Amendment to the United States Constitution in 1919, which prohibited the denial of citizens to vote based on sex.

== History ==
=== Origins in the late 19th century ===
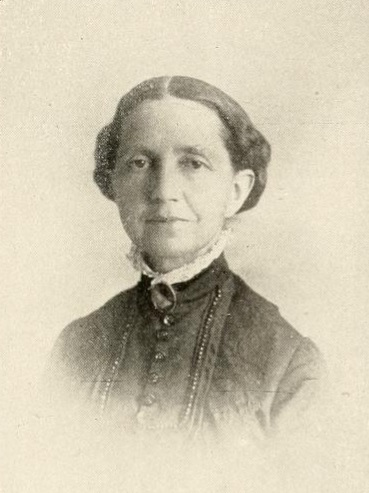
Sarah Burger Stearns was named the organization's first president in 1881.

In the 1870s, many women across Minnesota organized local women's suffrage groups. In 1875, the Minnesota Legislature recognized women's right to vote in school board elections. However, many women wanted to vote in all elections. Seeing the need for a statewide agency, 14 women formed the Minnesota Woman Suffrage Association (MWSA) in Hastings in 1881. (Note: The charter members of the MWSA were: "Mrs. Harriet E. Bishop, Mrs. Martha Luly, St. Paul; Mrs. A. T. Anderson, Mrs. H. J. Moffit, Mrs. C. Smith, Minneapolis; Mrs. Harriet A. Hobart, Julia Bullard Nelson, Mrs. R. Coons, Red Wing; Sarah Burger Stearns, Duluth; Mrs. L. C. Clarke, Worthington; Mrs. L. G. Finen, Albert Lea; Mrs. K. E. Webster, Mrs. Minnie Reed, Mrs. M. A. VanHoesen, Hastings".) The Minnesota chapter was affiliated with the National American Woman Suffrage Association (NAWSA). Among the founders of the MWSA were Harriet Bishop and Sarah Burger Stearns. Stearns became the organization's first president. By 1882, the MWSA had grown to 200 members. In 1885, MWSA-president Martha Ripley convinced NAWSA to hold their annual meeting in Minnesota. This national event demonstrated the importance of the Minnesota chapter to the larger organization. It also drew the attention of Minnesota's male lawmakers.

In 1893, the MWSA convinced the Minnesota Senate to take up women's suffrage legislation. President Julia Bullard Nelson worked with Ignatius Donnelly, a populist state senator. Populist regularly supported a women's suffrage agenda. Nelson herself was a populist school superintendent candidate in 1894. Nelson and Donnelly initially sought the vote for women in municipal elections. However, the Senate went further. Its members voted on a bill to remove the word "male" from the state's voting requirements, which passed on a vote of 32 to 19. The legislation did not pass the Minnesota House of Representatives, a necessary step towards its final enactment. That chamber did not have time to take it up before the legislative session ended. Even if it had passed the state house, however, the voters of Minnesota would have had to approve it before it became law.

After the failure of the 1893 amendment, the suffrage movement continued, but MWSA was unable to build on its earlier success. The MWSA and its ally, the Political Equality Club, placed women's suffrage before the state legislature every session. Each time, the bill either did not advance out of committee or it was defeated on the floor.

=== In the early 20th century ===
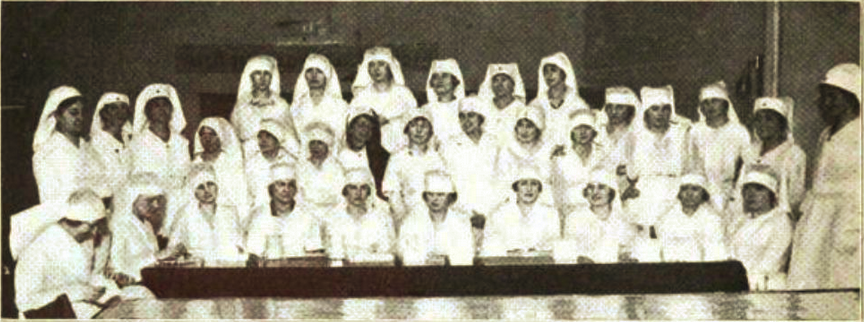
Hennepin County Suffrage Association's Red Cross Squad in 1918.

In 1907 the MWSA helped establish the Scandinavian Woman Suffrage Association. During the 1910s, the suffrage movement gained momentum. In 1914, Clara Ueland—who would later become the MWSA's president in 1915—organized a parade through Minneapolis of over 2,000 suffrage supporters. Media coverage of the event gave the movement renewed attention. During this period, the MWSA had to contend with a rival organization, a Minnesota branch of the National Woman's Party (NWP). The NWP was more radical than the MWSA. It was much more likely to take direct action, such as hunger strikes, than the MWSA. Despite these differences in opinion, the two organizations often worked together.

By 1919, about 30,000 women across the state officially belonged to local suffrage associations. Many joined the MWSA, the NWP, and other organizations. Their numbers and continued activities convinced lawmakers to act. In 1919, the Minnesota legislature recognized women's right to vote in presidential elections. The same year, the legislature ratified the Nineteenth Amendment to the United States Constitution, which stated that "the right of citizens of the United States to vote shall not be denied or abridged by the United States or by any State on account of sex". The amendment took effect in 1920 after it had been ratified by the required threshold of two-thirds of all states.

=== Post-Nineteenth Amendment legacy ===
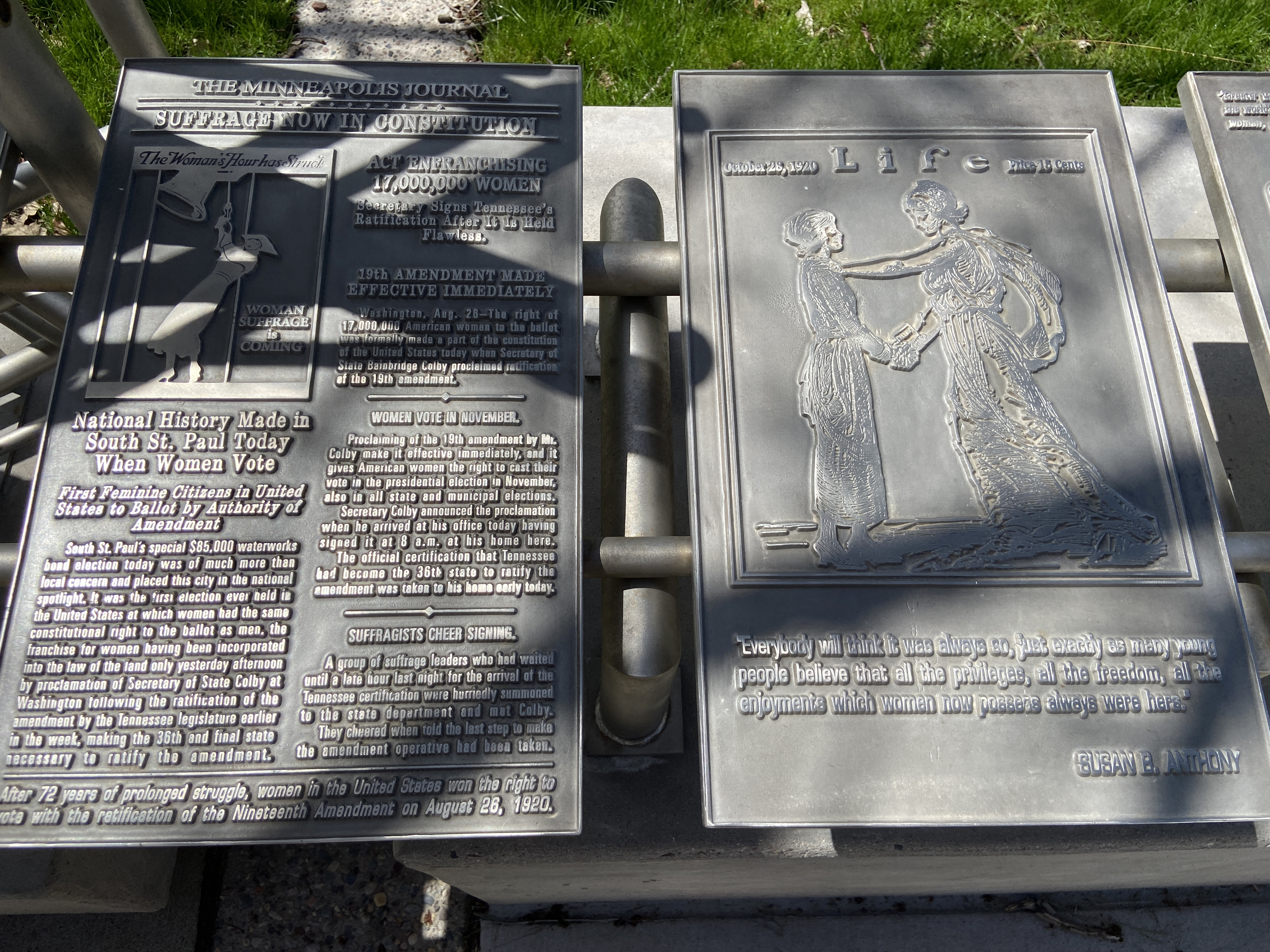
Minnesota Woman Suffrage Memorial at the State Capitol in 2021.

With their right to vote secured, the MWSA became the Minnesota chapter of the League of Women Voters, selecting Clara Ueland as their first president. The League was still active in Minnesota politics in the 21st Century, publishing a voting guide to inform voters on candidate positions on issues affecting women.

A permanent fixture dedicated to the achievements of the MWSA was installed on the lawn of the Minnesota State Capitol in 2000 and is known as the Minnesota Woman Suffrage Memorial.
