= Clara Ueland =

American community activist and suffragist

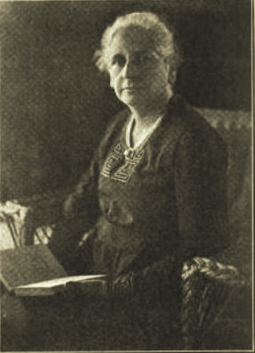
- Ueland, ca. 1917
- Born: Clara Hampson; October 10, 1860; Akron, Ohio, U.S.
- Died: March 1, 1927 (aged 66); Minnesota, U.S.
- Resting place: Lakewood Cemetery
- Children: Brenda Ueland

Clara Hampson Ueland (October 10, 1860 – March 1, 1927) was an American community activist and suffragist. She was the first president of the Minnesota League of Women Voters and worked to advance public welfare legislation.

== Early life ==
Clara Hampson was born on October 10, 1860, in Akron, Ohio, to parents Eliza Osborn and Henry Oscar Hampson. She moved to Minnesota with her family in 1869, first settling in Faribault, before moving to Minneapolis around 1872. She worked as a schoolteacher before marrying Norwegian-American lawyer Andreas Ueland in 1885.

== Career and political activism ==
In 1892, Ueland campaigned to allow women on the Minneapolis School Board. Ueland taught kindergarten in her home and worked to establish kindergartens in the schools of Minneapolis. After attending a Minneapolis suffrage convention in 1901, Ueland joined two related organizations, and went on to help found the Woman's Club of Minneapolis, which she left in 1912 to focus on voting rights for women.

In 1913, Ueland founded the Equal Suffrage Organization of Minneapolis. In 1914, she organized a suffrage parade of 2,000 marchers, the largest suffrage parade in state history. Following the success of the parade, Ueland became president of the Minnesota Woman Suffrage Association (MWSA) and served in that position until 1920. Ueland prioritized outreach via political districts throughout Minnesota, sending letters, making speeches, and calling directly on policy makers. Ueland is known for having made the argument, "Minnesota denies the vote to criminals, lunatics, idiots, and women. Is this chivalry?"

With ratification of the 19th amendment, the MWSA became the Minnesota League of Women Voters and Ueland served as its first president. In 1922, she led a campaign to pass a child labor amendment, which failed multiple times. She also worked to elect women and support workers and mothers.

Ueland travelled to Connecticut in 1920 as part of the "Emergency Suffrage Corps'" to protest Governor Marcus H. Holcomb's refusal to call a special session to ratify the suffrage amendment. In 1921, she was appointed chair of the Minneapolis fundraising committee for the Woodrow Wilson Foundation. She was presented the pen that Minnesota Governor Joseph A. A. Burnquist used when signing the presidential suffrage bill. In 1925, Ueland criticized Republican foreign policy and "back-door" cooperation with the League of Nations, saying, "We have got to spread the gospel among the women, telling them that they are paying too much for cotton and woolen goods, for aluminumware and that the country cannot recover from hard times unless we reduce the tariff."

== Personal life and death ==
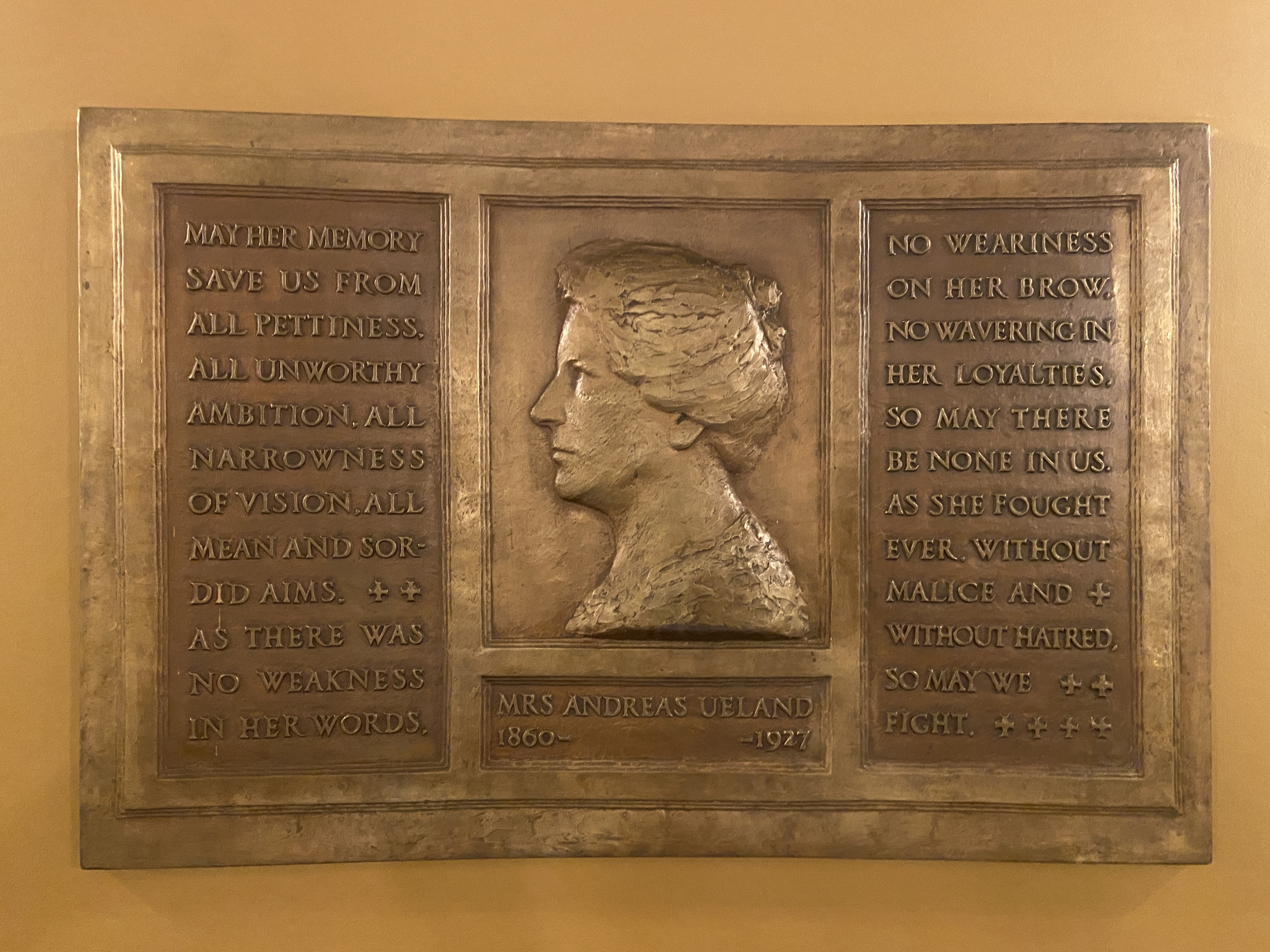
Clara Ueland's Plaque

She married lawyer Andreas Ueland in 1885. They had eight children together. The couple and their three oldest daughters moved into a sixteen-room house on the south shore of Lake Calhoun in 1891. She was the mother of writer Brenda Ueland, who wrote a biography of her later published as O Clouds, Unfold!.

Many of her children shared her belief in women's rights and activism. She taught her family in the home to break gender norms, believing her sons should do housework and her daughters should attend college.

She died after being struck by a truck driver as she was crossing the street near her home on March 1, 1927. She was cremated and interred at Lakewood Cemetery.

A plaque in Ueland's honor was placed in 1927 at the Minnesota State Capitol.
