= Thomas Pynchon bibliography =

List of works by Thomas Pynchon

The bibliography of the American novelist Thomas Pynchon (b. 1937) includes both fiction and nonfiction works.

== Fiction ==
=== Books ===
Date	Title	Format	Pages	Publisher	Unique identifiers	Ref.
Mar 18, 1963	V.	Novel	492	Lippincott (Philadelphia)	LCCN 63-8634; OCLC 288349	
Apr 27, 1966	The Crying of Lot 49	Novella (Note: In the introduction to Slow Learner, Pynchon set the title as "The Crying of Lot 49"—within double quotation marks, rather than italics—and described it as a "story" that had been "marketed as a 'novel'".)	183	Lippincott (Philadelphia)	LCCN 66-12340; OCLC 922876835	
Mar 14, 1973	Gravity's Rainbow	Novel	760	Viking Press (New York)	ISBN 978-0-670-34832-9; OCLC 592261	
Apr 16, 1984	Slow Learner	Short story collection	193	Little, Brown (Boston)	ISBN 978-0-316-72442-5; OCLC 911296427	
Feb 1990 (Note: Vineland became available in bookstores in December 1989, six weeks before its official publication date of February 1990.)	Vineland	Novel	385	Little, Brown (Boston)	ISBN 978-0-316-72444-9; OCLC 861527896	
Apr 30, 1997	Mason & Dixon	Novel	773	Henry Holt (New York)	ISBN 978-0-8050-3758-6; OCLC 906735059	
Nov 21, 2006	Against the Day	Novel	1,085	Penguin Books (New York)	ISBN 978-1-59420-120-2; OCLC 474973291	
Aug 4, 2009	Inherent Vice	Novel	369	Penguin Books (New York)	ISBN 978-1-59420-224-7; OCLC 717766816	
Sep 17, 2013	Bleeding Edge	Novel	477	Penguin Books (New York)	ISBN 978-1-59420-423-4; OCLC 948264710	
Oct 7, 2025	Shadow Ticket	Novel	304	Penguin Books (New York)	ISBN 978-1-59420-610-8	

=== Short stories ===
Six short stories by Pynchon were published in various magazines between 1959 and 1964. Five of his stories were republished in the 1984 collection Slow Learner.

Date	Title	Publication	Included in Slow Learner	Ref.
Mar 1959	"The Small Rain"	Cornell Writer (Vol. 6, No. 2)	Yes	
Spring 1959	"Mortality and Mercy in Vienna"	Epoch (Vol. 9, No. 4)	No	
1960	"Low-lands"	New World Writing 16	Yes	
Spring 1960	"Entropy"	Kenyon Review (Vol. 22, No. 2)	Yes	
1961	"Under the Rose" (Note: A modified adaptation of "Under the Rose" became the third chapter of V. Critics have variously treated "Under the Rose" as a "pre- or meta-text" to V., or as a distinct work with an intertextual relationship to the novel.)	Noble Savage 3	Yes	
Dec 19–26 1964	"The Secret Integration"	The Saturday Evening Post	Yes	

=== Excerpts ===
This section includes excerpts published prior to the excerpted work. It does not include excerpts reprinted after the publication of the excerpted work.

Date	Title of excerpt	Excerpted work	Publication	Ref.
1965	"In Which Esther Gets a Nose Job"	V.	Black Humor (Note: Black Humor was an anthology edited by Bruce Jay Friedman and published by Bantam.)	
Dec 1965	"The World (This One), the Flesh (Mrs. Oedipa Maas), and the Testament of Pierce Inverarity"	The Crying of Lot 49	Esquire	
Mar 1966	"The Shrink Flips"	The Crying of Lot 49	Cavalier	

=== Juvenilia ===
Pynchon's juvenilia includes several short stories published in his high school student publication Purple and Gold, of which he was also an editor. As an undergraduate at Cornell University, he also co-wrote an unfinished, unpublished libretto for a dystopian musical with fellow student Kirkpatrick Sale.

Date	Title	Publication	Notes	Ref.
Nov 13, 1952	"Voice of the Hamster" [Part 1]	Purple and Gold Vol. 9, No. 2	Purple and Gold was a student publication at Oyster Bay High School. These stories were republished in an appendix of Chris Mead's 1989 bibliography of Pynchon's works; see Mead 1989, pp. 155–167.	
Dec 18, 1952	"Voice of the Hamster" [Part 2]	Purple and Gold Vol. 9, No. 3	Purple and Gold was a student publication at Oyster Bay High School. These stories were republished in an appendix of Chris Mead's 1989 bibliography of Pynchon's works; see Mead 1989, pp. 155–167.	
Jan 22, 1953	"Voice of the Hamster" [Part 3]	Purple and Gold Vol. 9, No. 4	Purple and Gold was a student publication at Oyster Bay High School. These stories were republished in an appendix of Chris Mead's 1989 bibliography of Pynchon's works; see Mead 1989, pp. 155–167.	
Feb 19, 1953	"Voice of the Hamster" [Part 4]	Purple and Gold Vol. 9, No. 5	Purple and Gold was a student publication at Oyster Bay High School. These stories were republished in an appendix of Chris Mead's 1989 bibliography of Pynchon's works; see Mead 1989, pp. 155–167.	
Mar 19, 1953	"Ye Legend of Sir Stupid and the Purple Knight"	Purple and Gold Vol. 9, No. 6	Purple and Gold was a student publication at Oyster Bay High School. These stories were republished in an appendix of Chris Mead's 1989 bibliography of Pynchon's works; see Mead 1989, pp. 155–167.	
Mar 19, 1953	"The Boys"	Purple and Gold Vol. 9, No. 6	Purple and Gold was a student publication at Oyster Bay High School. These stories were republished in an appendix of Chris Mead's 1989 bibliography of Pynchon's works; see Mead 1989, pp. 155–167.	
1958	Minstrel Island	Unpublished	Unpublished, unfinished manuscript co-written with Kirkpatrick Sale. Minstrel Island is a draft of the libretto for a dystopian sci-fi musical. The plot—in which technology corporation IBM has taken over the world and seeks to eradicate the last refuge of artists on "Minstrel Island"—evinces thematic concerns and subject matter that became hallmarks of Pynchon's literary works. Although the first act is reasonably complete, acts two and three exist only as notes, and there is significant hand-written marginalia throughout. The manuscript is held by the Harry Ransom Center at the University of Texas at Austin.	

== Nonfiction ==
Date	Title	Genre	Publication	Publisher	Notes	Ref.
Dec 1960	Autobiographical Sketch/Proposal to the Ford Foundation	Proposal	Proposal for Ford Foundation Fellowship	Unpublished	Part of an unsuccessful proposal for a Ford Foundation fellowship, likely written in June or July 1959. In 1989 a Foundation archivist made this document available to several researchers, including Steven Weisenburger, who describes (but does not quote from) it. Late in 1989, at Pynchon's request, the Ford Foundation closed the author's file for the next 50 years, making this manuscript generally unavailable until 2039.	
Dec 1960	"Togetherness"	Technical writing	Aerospace Safety Vol. 16, No. 12	United States Air Force	Written during Pynchon's employment at Boeing. The byline gives his name as "Thomas H. [sic] Pynchon", which is considered an error. Pynchon's middle name is "Ruggles".	
1960– 1962	[Various uncredited articles]	Technical writing	Bomarc Service News	Boeing	See section below.	
Dec 1965	"A Gift of Books"	Review	Holiday Vol. 38, No. 6	Curtis Publishing Company	Review of the 1958 Western novel Warlock by American author Oakley Hall (1920–2008).	
Jun 12, 1966	"A Journey into the Mind of Watts"	Essay	The New York Times Magazine	The New York Times	Essay on the Watts riots of August 11–16, 1965, and their aftermath in the neighborhood of Watts, Los Angeles, California.	
1983	Introduction to Been Down So Long It Looks Like Up to Me	Foreword	Been Down So Long It Looks Like Up to Me (3rd ed.)	Penguin Books	Introduction to a new edition of the 1966 novel by American author Richard Fariña (1937–1966), who had been Pynchon's friend and schoolmate at Cornell.	
1984	Introduction to Slow Learner	Preface	Slow Learner (1st ed.)	Little, Brown	An introduction to the collection of Pynchon's own early, previously published short stories. In the 20-page preface, Pynchon reflects on the development of his writing, with autobiographical details that have made it a rare source of information about his life. Though almost universally accepted as a work of nonfiction, the introduction has also been scrutinized as if it were a short story or a genre-ambiguous piece that may include elements of fiction.	
Oct 28, 1984	"Is It O.K. to Be a Luddite?"	Essay	The New York Times Book Review	The New York Times	Essay advocating for neo-Luddism.	
Apr 10, 1988	"The Heart's Eternal Vow"	Review	The New York Times Book Review	The New York Times	Review of the 1988 English-language translation of the novel Love in the Time of Cholera by Colombian author Gabriel García Márquez (1927–2014).	
1992	Introduction to The Teachings of Don B.	Foreword	The Teachings of Don B. (1st ed.)	Turtle Bay	Introduction to a collection of writings by American author Donald Barthelme (1931–1989) edited by Kim Herzinger.	
Jun 6, 1993	"Nearer, My Couch, to Thee"	Essay	The New York Times Book Review	The New York Times	Essay on sloth in America. First entry in a summer-long series about the seven deadly sins by Pynchon, Mary Gordon, John Updike, William Trevor, Gore Vidal, Richard Howard and A. S. Byatt. These, along with an eighth essay by Joyce Carol Oates, became the book Deadly Sins (ISBN 9780688136901).	
Apr 1994	Spiked! The Music of Spike Jones	Liner notes	Spiked! The Music of Spike Jones (CD compilation album)	Catalyst/BMG	Essay introducing the music of American bandleader Spike Jones (1911–1965), known for his satirical swing compositions and complex novelty arrangements.	
Mar 1996 (Note: According to some sources, Nobody's Cool was released in 1995. While the copyright registration for the album was dated 1995, it was not actually released until March 1996.)	Nobody's Cool	Liner notes	Nobody's Cool (studio album) by Lotion	SpinART Records	Essay introducing the album by the American alternative rock band Lotion.	
Jun 1996	"Lunch with Lotion"	Interview	Esquire Vol. 125, No. 6	Hearst Communications	Pynchon interviews the members of American alternative rock band Lotion.	
1997	Introduction to Stone Junction	Foreword	Stone Junction: An Alchemical Potboiler (1st. pbk. ed.)	Rebel Inc. (Edinburgh)	Introduction to the first UK paperback edition of the 1990 novel by American author Jim Dodge (1945–). Pynchon had written a blurb for the dust jacket of the novel's hardcover first edition. The following year, a US paperback edition with Pynchon's introduction was published by Grove Press (New York).	
Jan 1999	"Hallowe'en? Over Already?"	Essay	Cathedral School Newsletter	The Cathedral School of St. John the Divine, Manhattan	Written when Pynchon's son, Jackson, was a second-grade student at the Cathedral School. The essay describes activities at the school during the fall of 1998, including a guided tour of the Cathedral of St. John the Divine.	
2003	Introduction to Nineteen Eighty-Four	Foreword	Nineteen Eighty-Four (Centennial Edition)	Plume	Introduction to a new edition of the 1949 novel by English author George Orwell (1903–1950) marking the centenary of Orwell's birth. The edition also includes a 1961 afterword by German-American writer Erich Fromm (1900–1980).	
Nov 16, 2006	"The Evolution of The Daily Show"	Essay	The Daily Show: Ten Fu@#ing Years (The Concert)	Irving Plaza (New York)	Essay for the program of The Daily Show's Ten-Year Anniversary Concert at Irving Plaza on November 16, 2006.	

=== Technical writing for Boeing ===
Cover of Aerospace Safety
December 1960

"Togetherness"
Thomas H. [sic] Pynchon

"Togetherness" is the only published article with a confirmed attribution to Pynchon during his employment as a technical writer for Boeing.

Between February 22, 1960 and to September 13, 1962, Pynchon was employed as a technical writer for the corporation Boeing, a major aerospace manufacturer and defense contractor. During that time, only one technical article with Pynchon's byline appeared in print: the feature "Togetherness" in Aerospace Safety, a periodical published by the US Air Force rather than Boeing. While "Togetherness" is the only technical article that can be attributed to Pynchon with absolute certainty, it is considered extremely unlikely that he would have produced only one article during more than two years on the job. As such, scholars have conducted research to identify articles that can plausibly be attributed to Pynchon.

Pynchon is known to have worked primarily as a staff writer for Boeing's Bomarc Service News, an in-house periodical related to development of the CIM-10 Bomarc surface-to-air missile. (Note: Pynchon's connection to Bomarc Service News became known through the notice taken by other Boeing employees of his later fame as an author. When Pynchon won the William Faulkner Foundation Award for V., Kenneth Calkins—editor of the internal newsletter Boeing News—noted Pynchon had written for Bomarc Service News. E. A. Hixson, a former editor of Bomarc Service News, later confirmed that Pynchon had been on the publication's staff during his editorship.) It remains possible, albeit uncertain and unlikely, that Pynchon contributed to other publications as part of his work at Boeing. (Note: Two other in-house Boeing publications have been ruled out. A co-worker who personally knew the author recalled, years after the fact, that Pynchon had contributed to "the Minuteman Field Service News". However, the company's support publication for the LGM-30 Minuteman—actually called the Minuteman Service News—launched two months after Pynchon is believed to have departed Boeing. It is almost certain Pynchon did not contribute to The Boeing Magazine, as that publication included bylines on every article and never ran his name.) Definitive attribution of any Bomarc Service News articles to Pynchon is impossible because the publication never used bylines. Nonetheless, at least two scholars have used textual analysis in an attempt to identify likely Pynchon pieces:

1. In a 2000 article for Pynchon Notes, Adrian Wisnicki compiled a list of 24 "probable" and 10 "possible" examples of Pynchon's writing in Bomarc Service News based on stylistic and thematic similarities to known works.
2. In a 2019 article in the journal Textual Practice, Katie Muth used a stylometry-based authorship algorithm to identify eight Bomarc Service articles that were "closely correlated" with Pynchon's contemporaneous writing, as well as four that she determined were not correlated. Muth later claimed that, from the "handful" of Bomarc articles that could be reasonably attributed to Pynchon, two were "particularly" likely matches: "Torquing" (June 1960) and "The Mad Hatter and the Mercury Wetted Relays" (February 1962).

The following are Bomarc Service News articles assessed as potential Pynchon articles by Wisnicki, Muth, or both.

Articles Pynchon may have written for Bomarc Service News
Date	Title	Probability of Pynchon's authorship, according to...		Ref.
Date	Title	Wisnicki 2000–2001	Muth 2019a/2019b	Ref.
Mar 1960	"Vibration Testing"	Probable	"Closely correlated"	
Apr 1960	"Weight Control"	Probable	N/A	
May 1960	"Missile Mockups"	Probable	N/A	
Jun 1960	"Torquing"	Probable	"Closely correlated" + "particularly" likely	
Jul 1960	"SCE Calibration"	Probable	N/A	
Sep 1960	"Package Handling"	Probable	N/A	
Oct 1960	"Analog Simulations"	Probable	Not correlated	
Oct 1960	"ANFA Hazard"	Probable	N/A	
Nov 1960	"1,000,000,000 = One Gigamile"	Probable	N/A	
Nov 1960	"Telemetering: Recovery, Recording, Reduction"	Possible	Not correlated	
Dec 1960	"Missile Sealants"	Possible	N/A	
Jan 1961	"Blame It on Osmosis"	Possible	N/A	
Mar 1961	"Separation Diaphragms"	Probable	N/A	
Apr 1961	"Maintainability, Part 2"	Probable	Not correlated	
Jun 1961	"Maintainability, Part 3"	Probable	N/A	
Jul 1961	"Of Astronauts and Acid"	Possible	N/A	
Jul 1961	"Records Prove Valuable"	Possible	N/A	
Aug 1961	"Soldering"	Probable	"Closely correlated"	
Sep 1961	"Maintainability, Part 4"	Probable	N/A	
Oct 1961	"Transporter-Loader Hoist Safety"	Possible	N/A	
Jan 1962	"Attention to Detail"	Probable	N/A	
Jan 1962	"IM-99B Flyaway Kits"	Possible	N/A	
Feb 1962	"'Teflon' in Depth"	Probable	Not correlated	
Feb 1962	"The Mad Hatter and the Mercury Wetted Relays"	Probable	"Closely correlated" + "particularly" likely	
Mar 1962	"A Blinding Flash"	Possible	N/A	
Mar 1962	"Vent Those Tanks!"	Possible	N/A	
Apr 1962	"MIU Plug Problems"	Probable	"Closely correlated"	
Jul 1962	"Environmental Protection"	Probable	"Closely correlated"	
Aug 1962	"The Trouble with Safety Is... People!"	Probable	"Closely correlated"	
Sep 1962	"Hydrazine Tank Cartridge Replacement"	Probable	"Closely correlated"	
Oct 1962	"Bomarc Reliability and You"	Probable	N/A	
Oct 1962	"Safety Devices?"	Possible	N/A	

== Correspondence ==
Date	Title	Genre	Publication	Publisher	Notes	Ref.
1963– 1982	Letters to Candida Donadio	Letters	Unpublished, except for brief excerpts quoted in an article from The New York Times.	—N/a	Donadio was Pynchon's literary agent from 1963–1982. In 1984, she sold a collection of Pynchon's correspondence to her: 120 letters dated between March 4, 1963 and January 5, 1982. The buyer was Carter Burden, a collector of rare American literature. After Burden's death, his family arranged in 1998 to donate his literary collection to the Pierpont Morgan Library in Manhattan. The library initially intended to make the letters available to scholars by the end of the year. It also provided access to The New York Times, which published excerpts from some of the letters. However, following expressions of disapproval from Pynchon's agent and his attorney, the library and Burden family walked back their plan to provide scholarly access. Instead, the library announced that the letters will remain private during Pynchon's lifetime.	
Aug 1965	Letter to Jules Siegel	Letter	Cavalier Vol. 15, No. 146, p. 16	Fawcett Publications	Several paragraphs from the letter—totaling 228 words—were quoted in "The Dark Triumvirate", an article in Cavalier magazine by Siegel (1935–2012) about the "black humor" of Pynchon, Bruce Jay Friedman, and Joseph Heller. Siegel indicated that the letter had been addressed to "a suicidal writer friend" but did not refer to its recipient by name. Others have surmised that it had been addressed to Siegel himself. Pynchon recommended the article to a friend, the folk etymologist Peter Tamony, indicating that he did not object to Siegel's extensive quotation from a private letter. In 1984, Steven Moore reprinted the quoted portion of the letter in the Fall 1984 issue of Pynchon Notes.	
Jul 17, 1966	"Pros and Cohns"	Letter to the editor	The New York Times Book Review	The New York Times	Response to an accusation of plagiarism directed at Pynchon by the French author Romain Gary, who asserted that Pynchon had stolen "Genghis Cohen"—the name of a character in The Crying of Lot 49—from the titular character of Gary's 1967 novel The Dance of Genghis Cohn (La danse de Gengis Cohn). Pynchon denied the allegation, said he had never heard of Gary or his works, and claimed that their independent invention of a "trivial" pun on the name Genghis Khan was purely coincidental.	
1976	Letter to Richard Wilbur	Letter	Proceedings of the American Academy of Arts and Letters and the National Institute of Arts and Letters, 2nd series, Vol. 26, pp. 43–46: "Presentation to Thomas Pynchon of the Howells Medal for Fiction of the Academy by William Styron"	American Academy of Arts and Letters	The letter declined the William Dean Howells Medal for Fiction, which Pynchon had been awarded by the American Academy of Arts and Letters for Gravity's Rainbow. At the time, Wilbur was president of the Academy.	
Apr 28, 1977	Letter to John Calvin Batchelor	Letter to the editor	The SoHo Weekly News Vol. 4, No. 30 (quoted in "The Ghost of Richard Fariña" by Batchelor)	Michael Goldstein	In an article published by the SoHo Weekly News on April 24, 1976, Batchelor alleged that there was no such person as Thomas Pynchon. Instead, Batchelor posited, the name was merely a pseudonym of J. D. Salinger, who had withdrawn from public life and stopped publishing fiction just before Pynchon's career began. In a letter written on MGM stationery, Pynchon replied: "Not bad. Keep trying." Batchelor quoted the letter in a follow-up piece, in which he conceded Pynchon's existence as a real person but maintained that Salinger had written most of Pynchon's works, while suggesting that others may have also contributed to the Pynchon oeuvre, including Donald Barthelme or even Pynchon himself. Later, Batchelor accepted Pynchon's sole authorship of his works.	
1988	Letter to Thomas F. Hirsch	Letter	The Fictional Labyrinths of Thomas Pynchon by David Seed	Macmillan Press	Hirsch, a graduate student, wrote to Pynchon about material in chapter 9 of V. related to historical South West Africa. Pynchon replied to Hirsch in a letter dated January 8, 1969, which was published in 1988 as an appendix to The Fictional Labyrinths of Thomas Pynchon.	
Mar 12, 1989	"Words for Salman Rushdie"	Letter	The New York Times Book Review	The New York Times	"Words for Salman Rushdie" is a collection of open letters by "28 distinguished writers born in 21 countries" offering support to the British Indian author Salman Rushdie during the controversy against Rushdie's novel The Satanic Verses (1988). The New York Times Book Review published the letters less than a month after Ayatollah Khomeini issued a fatwa calling for the deaths of Rushdie and his publishers. At 68 words, Pynchon's letter for Rushdie was one of his briefest published works.	
1990	Letters to Corlies Smith	Letter	Of a Fond Ghoul	The Blown Litter Press	Corlies Smith (1929–2004) was the editor of Pynchon's first two novels at Lippincott. In 1990, seven of Pynchon's letters to Smith—dated between August 31, 1961, and June 2, 1962—were published without permission in the book Of a Fond Ghoul. These letters concern the editing process readying V. for publication. The original copies were stolen from the offices of Harper & Row.	
Dec 5, 2006	Letter to Dan Franklin at Jonathan Cape	Letter	The Daily Telegraph	Telegraph Media Group	Dan Franklin, then-director of the London publishing firm Jonathan Cape, solicited letters of support for English author Ian McEwan from prominent authors of historical fiction. McEwan had been accused of plagiarizing historical texts in his 2001 novel Atonement. Pynchon's letter was quoted in "The borrowers: 'why McEwan is no plagiarist'", an article by Nigel Reynolds in The Daily Telegraph. Other authors who made statements in McEwan's defense included Martin Amis, Margaret Atwood, Thomas Keneally, Zadie Smith, and John Updike.	

== Misattributed and disputed works ==
The following are written works for which there has been some claim or question of Pynchon's authorship. These were either works attributed to Pynchon upon publication—albeit dubiously—or works that attracted claims of being written by Pynchon under a pseudonym. None of these are generally accepted as authentic Pynchon writings, and in some cases the possibility of his authorship has been ruled out.

Date	Title	Notes
1983–1988	Wanda Tinasky letters to the editor	In 1990, Bruce Anderson, the editor of the Anderson Valley Advertiser, claimed that Thomas Pynchon authored letters sent to the Mendocino Commentary and AVA between 1983 and 1988 under the name Wanda Tinasky. In 1994 this was followed by Fred Gardner research and then, in 1996, by a book by TR Factor entitled The Letters of Wanda Tinasky, supporting the claim of Pynchon authorship. The Pynchon connection was denied by Pynchon's agent, Melanie Jackson. In 1998 Don Foster named an obscure Beat poet and writer, Tom Hawkins, as the author of the letters. This led to further research by Factor proving that Hawkins had authored the Tinasky letters.
1990	Barefoot in the Head liner notes	Pynchon's name was signed to the liner notes of Barefoot in the Head, a 1990 studio album by noise musicians Jim Sauter, Don Dietrich, and Thurston Moore. Pynchon's agent denied his authorship. The misattribution was a prank. The true author is unknown. Tim Ware, a musician and Pynchon enthusiast, suggested that the notes had mostly likely been written by Byron Coley, a music critic affiliated with Moore's band Sonic Youth.
2002 (Note: Citations to the Playboy Japan interview sometimes indicate the December 2001 "Special Issue ** Battle on Terror", or inconsistently dated either December 2001 or January 2002. According to the cumulative bibliography maintained by the journal Pynchon Notes, the correct date of the Playboy Japan interview is January 2002.)	Interview in Playboy Japan	In January 2002, Playboy Japan published a purported interview with Pynchon conducted by Japanese journalist Motokazu Ohno. If authentic, it represents Pynchon's first and only sustained interview with the press, breaking four decades of media silence. In the interview, Pynchon expressed doubt about the existence of Osama bin Laden (more specifically, Pynchon said bin Laden was "someone's clown for a rodeo" and should be understood "as a symbol rather than a man"), criticized American media coverage of the September 11 attacks, and sarcastically recommended investing in the tobacco industry due to the national mood of heightened anxiety. Pynchon's agent "disavowed" the interview. Its authenticity is generally regarded as dubious. Literary scholar Paolo Simonetti labeled the interview "unreliable" and "probably fake", noting that although the questioning of bin Laden's existence was "typically Pynchonian" in style and substance, it remained "unlikely that the author would have expressed it plainly in an interview." Pynchon later incorporated the topic of 9/11 conspiracy theories into the plot of his 2013 novel Bleeding Edge.
2015	Cow Country	Rumors that Pynchon had secretly written the 2015 novel Cow Country—published by a small press under the pseudonym Adrian Jones Pearson—led to a significant increase in the book's sales. Art Winslow, a critic and former editor at The Nation, pitched the theory of Pynchon's authorship five months after the novel's release in Harper's Magazine. It was denied by Pynchon's agent and his publisher, Penguin Books. Steven Moore, a critic who had blurbed Cow Country after becoming acquainted with its real author, also denied Pynchon's involvement. Several Pynchon scholars criticized Winslow's analysis as implausible. According to an investigation by journalist Alex Shephard, the true author of Cow Country is probably a writer named A. J. Perry.
