= The Agnew Funeral E.P. =

EP by Lotion
- Released: October 3, 1995
- Genre: Alternative rock
- Length: 44:01
- Language: English
- Label: spinART
- Producer: Gary Hardy, Ken Heitmueller, Mark Mason, and Jim Rondinelli

Lotion chronology
full Isaac (1994)	The Agnew Funeral E.P. (1995)	Nobody's Cool (1996)

Professional ratings
Review scores
Source	Rating
Allmusic	4/5 stars

The Agnew Funeral E.P. is a 1995 extended play from Lotion, released through spinART Records.

== Track listing ==
All songs composed by Lotion, except where noted

1. "Marijuana Vietnam" – 4:49
2. "Walk Away Renée" (Michael Brown, Bob Calilli, and Michael Lookofsky) – 2:47
3. "Switch" – 2:48
4. "Famous Redheads" – 5:12
5. "Treat Me" – 5:41
6. "Untitled" – 22:44

The 10" EP version excludes "Untitled".

== Personnel ==
Lotion

- Bill Ferguson – bass guitar
- Jim Ferguson – guitar
- Rob Youngberg – drums
- Tony Zajkowski – vocals

Additional musicians

- Joe McGinty – synthesizer
- Kurt Ralske – flugelhorn
