= Thomas Pynchon =

American novelist (born 1937)

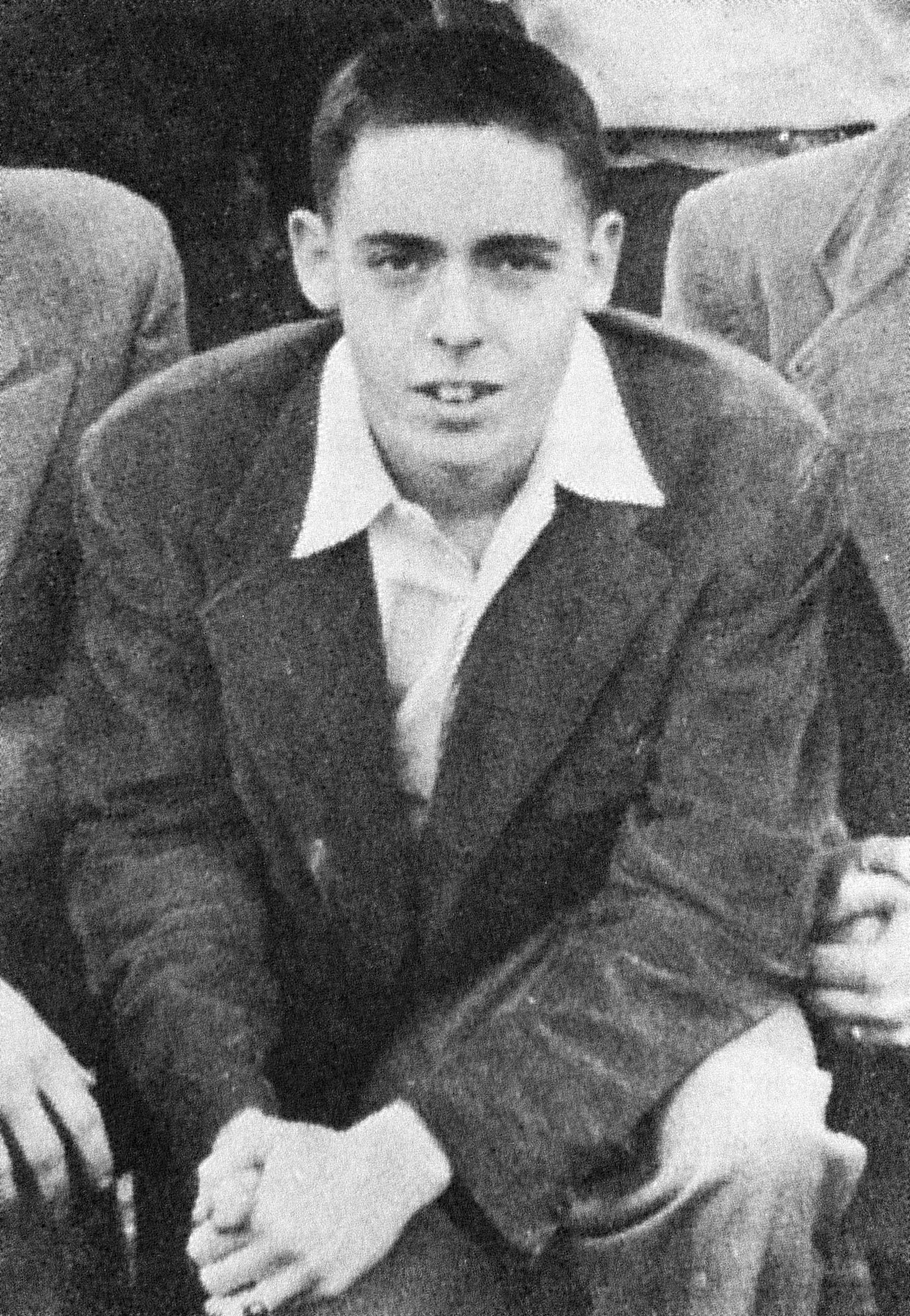
- Pynchon in his 1953 yearbook image
- Born: Thomas Ruggles Pynchon Jr. May 8, 1937 (age 89); Glen Cove, New York, U.S.
- Education: Cornell University (BA)
- Spouse: Melanie Jackson (m. 1990)
- Children: 1
- Writing career
- Period: c. 1959–present
- Notable works: V. (1963); The Crying of Lot 49 (1966); Gravity's Rainbow (1973); Mason & Dixon (1997); Inherent Vice (2009); See bibliography
- Movement: Postmodern literature
- Military career
- Allegiance: United States
- Branch: United States Navy
- Service years: 1955–1957
- Service number: 4881936

Thomas Ruggles Pynchon Jr. (/ˈpɪntʃɒn/ PIN-chon, commonly /ˈpɪntʃən/ PIN-chən; born May 8, 1937) is an American novelist. He is known for his dense, complex works of postmodern fiction, which are distinguished by their paranoid tone, absurd humor, and references to history, art, science, and popular culture. He is widely regarded as one of the greatest American novelists. Pynchon is notoriously reclusive. Few photographs of him have been published, and rumors about his location and identity have circulated since the 1960s.

Pynchon served two years in the United States Navy and earned an English degree from Cornell University. After publishing several short stories in the late 1950s and early 1960s, he began composing the novels for which he is best known: V. (1963), The Crying of Lot 49 (1966), and Gravity's Rainbow (1973). For the last, Pynchon won the 1974 U.S. National Book Award for Fiction. Pynchon followed with the novels Vineland (1990), Mason & Dixon (1997), Against the Day (2006), Inherent Vice (2009), which was adapted for film in 2014, and Bleeding Edge (2013). Pynchon's latest novel, Shadow Ticket, was published in 2025.

== Early life ==
Thomas Pynchon was born on May 8, 1937, in Glen Cove, New York on Long Island, one of three children of engineer and politician Thomas Ruggles Pynchon Sr. (1907–1995) and Katherine Frances Bennett (1909–1996), a nurse. As a child, Pynchon alternately attended an Episcopal church with his father and a Catholic church with his mother.

=== Education and naval career ===
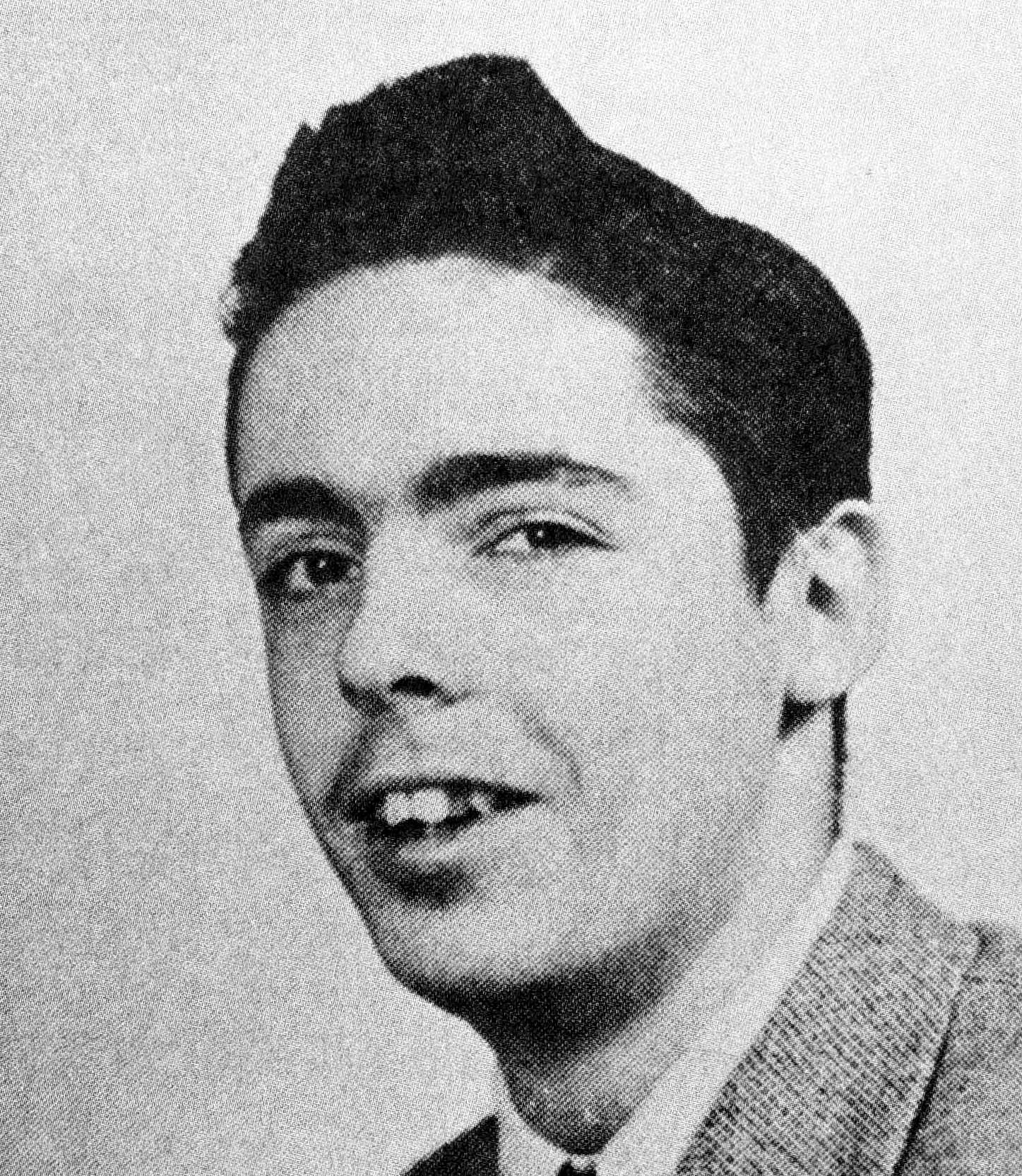
Pynchon, aged 16, in his high school senior portrait

A "voracious reader and precocious writer", Pynchon is believed to have skipped two grades before high school. He attended Oyster Bay High School in Oyster Bay, where he was named "student of the year" and contributed short fictional pieces to his school newspaper. These juvenilia incorporated some of the literary motifs and subject matter he has used throughout his career: oddball names, sophomoric humor, drug use and paranoia.

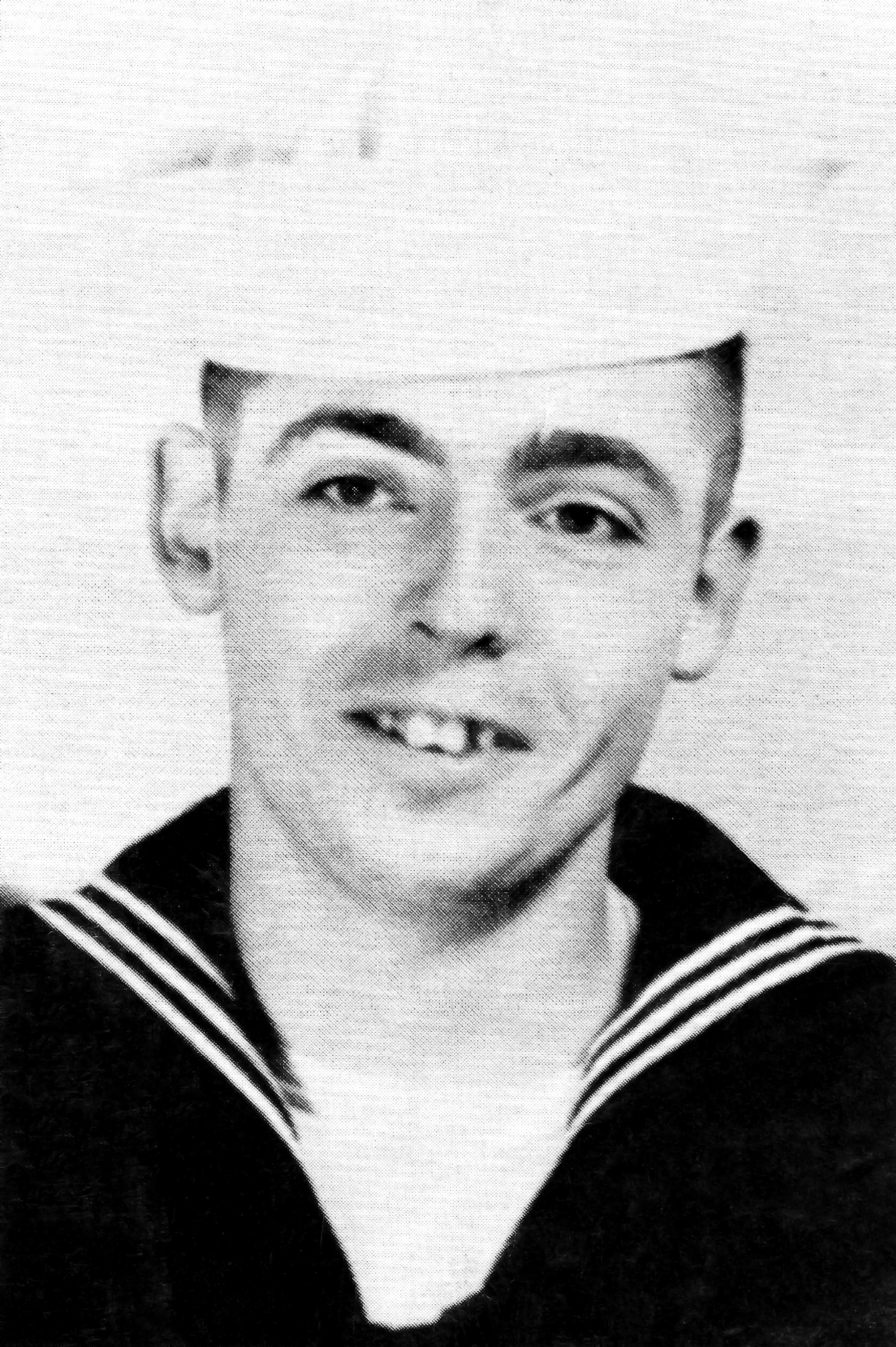
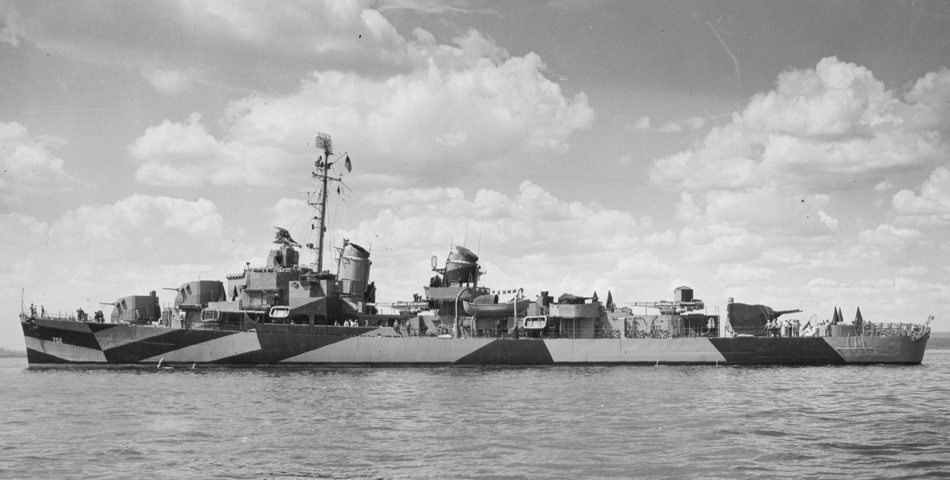
During his time as a US Navy sailor, Pynchon (pictured c. 1955) is believed to have served aboard the USS Hank during the Suez Crisis.

Pynchon graduated from high school in 1953 at age 16. That fall, he went to Cornell University to study engineering physics. At the end of his sophomore year, he enlisted in the U.S. Navy. He attended boot camp at United States Naval Training Center Bainbridge, Maryland, then received training to be an electrician at a base in Norfolk, Virginia. In 1956, he was aboard the destroyer USS Hank in the Mediterranean during the Suez Crisis. According to recollections from his Navy friends, Pynchon said at the time that he did not intend to complete his college education.

In 1957, Pynchon returned to Cornell to pursue a degree in English. His first published story, "The Small Rain", appeared in the Cornell Writer in March 1959, and narrates an actual experience of a friend who had served in the Army. Pynchon's later fiction draws freely upon his experiences in the Navy. His short story "Mortality and Mercy in Vienna" was published in the Spring 1959 issue of Epoch magazine.

While at Cornell, Pynchon befriended Richard Fariña, Kirkpatrick Sale, and David Shetzline. Pynchon dedicated Gravity's Rainbow to Fariña, and served as his best man and his pallbearer. In Pynchon's introduction to Fariña's novel Been Down So Long It Looks Like Up to Me, he writes, "we also succeeded in getting on the same literary wavelength. We showed up once at a party, not a masquerade party, in disguise—he as Hemingway, I as Scott Fitzgerald, each of us aware that the other had been through a phase of enthusiasm for his respective author ... Also in '59 we simultaneously picked up on what I still think is among the finest American novels, Oakley Hall's Warlock. We set about getting others to read it too, and for a while we had a micro-cult going. Soon a number of us were talking in Warlock dialogue, a kind of thoughtful, stylized, Victorian-Wild West diction."

Pynchon reportedly attended lectures by Vladimir Nabokov, who at the time taught literature at Cornell. Nabokov later said that he had no memory of Pynchon, but Nabokov's wife Véra, who graded her husband's class papers, said she remembered his distinctive handwriting as a mixture of printed and cursive letters, "half printing, half script". In 1958, Pynchon and Sale wrote part or all of a science-fiction musical, Minstrel Island, which portrays a dystopian future in which IBM rules the world. Pynchon received his B.A. with distinction as a member of Phi Beta Kappa in June 1959.

== Career ==
=== Early career ===
==== 1950s ====
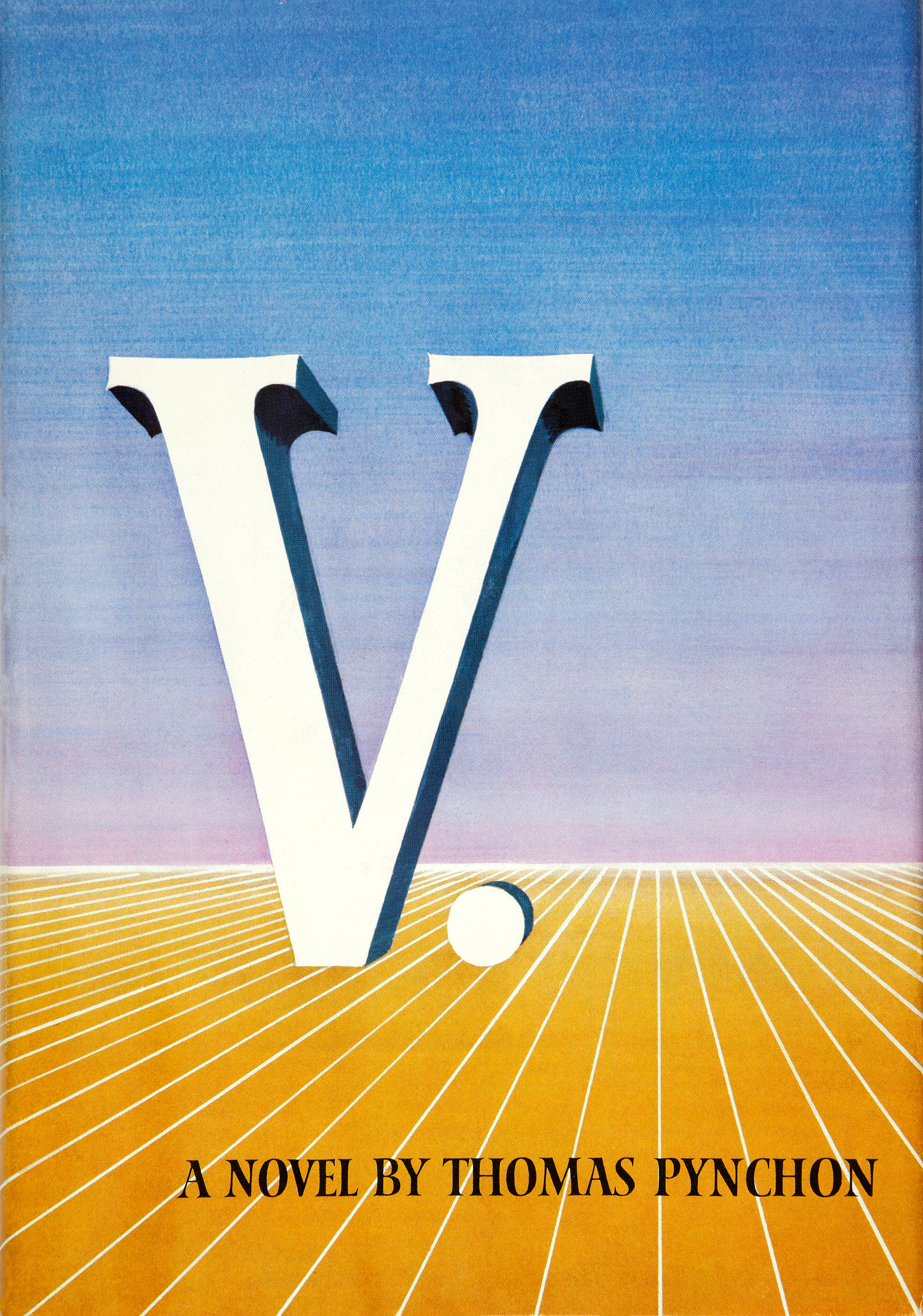
V. (1963)

After leaving Cornell, Pynchon began to work on his first novel, V. From February 1960 to September 1962, he was employed as a technical writer at Boeing in Seattle, where he compiled safety articles for the Bomarc Service News, a support newsletter for the BOMARC surface-to-air missile deployed by the U.S. Air Force. Pynchon's experiences at Boeing inspired his depictions of the "Yoyodyne" corporation in V. and The Crying of Lot 49, and both his background in physics and the technical journalism he undertook at Boeing provided material for Gravity's Rainbow. V. won the William Faulkner Foundation Award for Notable First Novel and was a finalist for the National Book Award.

George Plimpton gave the book a positive review in The New York Times, calling it a picaresque novel, in which "The author can tell his favorite jokes, throw in a song, indulge in a fantasy, include his own verse, display an intimate knowledge of such disparate subjects as physics, astronomy, art, jazz, how a nose-job is done, the wildlife in the New York sewage system. These indeed are some of the topics which constitute a recent and remarkable example of the genre: a brilliant and turbulent first novel published this month by a young Cornell graduate, Thomas Pynchon." Plimpton called Pynchon "a writer of staggering promise".

Time's review of V. concluded: "V. sails with majesty through caverns measureless to man. What does it mean? Who, finally, is V.? Few books haunt the waking or the sleeping mind, but this is one. Who, indeed?"

==== 1960s ====
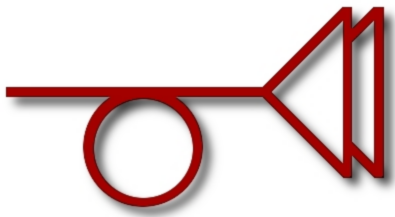
Pynchon created the "muted post horn" as a symbol for the secret "Trystero" society in The Crying of Lot 49.

After resigning from Boeing, he spent some time in New York and Mexico before moving to California, where he was reportedly based for much of the 1960s and early 1970s, most notably in a small downstairs apartment at 217 33rd St. in Manhattan Beach where he lived as he was composing what became Gravity's Rainbow.

In 1964 he applied to study mathematics as a graduate student at the University of California, Berkeley, but was turned down.

In an April 1964 letter to his agent, Candida Donadio, Pynchon wrote that he had four novels in progress, announcing: "If they come out on paper anything like they are inside my head then it will be the literary event of the millennium."

From the mid-1960s he regularly provided blurbs and introductions for a wide range of novels and nonfiction works. He contributed an appreciation of Oakley Hall's Warlock in a feature called "A Gift of Books" in the December 1965 issue of Holiday. Pynchon wrote that Hall "has restored to the myth of Tombstone its full, mortal, blooded humanity ... It is this deep sensitivity to abysses that makes Warlock, I think, one of our best American novels. For we are a nation that can, many of us, toss with all aplomb our candy wrapper into the Grand Canyon itself, snap a color shot and drive away; and we need voices like Oakley Hall's to remind us how far that piece of paper, still fluttering brightly behind us, has to fall."

In December 1965, Pynchon politely turned down an invitation from Stanley Edgar Hyman to teach literature at Bennington College, writing that he had resolved, two or three years earlier, to write three novels at once. Pynchon described the decision as "a moment of temporary insanity", but said he was "too stubborn to let any of them go, let alone all of them."

Pynchon's second novel, The Crying of Lot 49, was published a few months later in 1966. Whether it was one of the three or four novels Pynchon had in progress is not known, but in a 1965 letter to Donadio, Pynchon had written that he was in the middle of writing a "potboiler". When the book grew to 155 pages, he called it "a short story, but with gland trouble", and hoped that Donadio could "unload it on some poor sucker."

The Crying of Lot 49 won the Richard and Hinda Rosenthal Foundation Award shortly after publication. Although more concise and linear in its structure than Pynchon's other novels, its labyrinthine plot features an ancient, underground mail service known as "The Tristero" or "Trystero", a parody of a Jacobean revenge drama called The Courier's Tragedy, and a corporate conspiracy involving the bones of World War II American GIs being used as charcoal cigarette filters. It proposes a series of seemingly incredible connections between these events and other similarly bizarre revelations that confront the novel's protagonist, Oedipa Maas. Like V., the novel contains a wealth of references to science, technology, and obscure historical events. The Crying of Lot 49 also continues Pynchon's habits of writing satiric song lyrics and referencing popular culture. An example of both can be seen in allusion to the narrator of Nabokov's Lolita in the lyric of a love lament sung by a member of "The Paranoids", an American teenage band who deliberately sing their songs with British accents (p. 17). Despite Pynchon's alleged dislike, Lot 49 received positive reviews; Harold Bloom named it one of Pynchon's "canonical works", along with Gravity's Rainbow and Mason & Dixon. It was included on Time's list of the 100 best English-language novels published since the magazine's founding in 1923. Richard Lacayao wrote, "With its slapstick paranoia and heartbreaking metaphysical soliloquies, Lot 49 takes place in the tragicomic universe that is instantly recognizable as Pynchon-land. Is it also a mystery novel? Absolutely, so long as you recognize the mystery here is the one at the heart of everything".

In June 1966, Pynchon wrote "A Journey Into the Mind of Watts", a firsthand report on the aftermath and legacy of the Watts Riots in Los Angeles published in The New York Times Magazine.

Pynchon retrospectively found that the hippie movement, both in the form of the Beats of the 1950s and the resurgence form of the 1960s, "placed too much emphasis on youth, including the eternal variety." In 1968, Pynchon was one of 447 signatories to the "Writers and Editors War Tax Protest". Full-page advertisements in the New York Post and The New York Review of Books listed the names of those who had pledged not to pay "the proposed 10% income tax surcharge or any war-designated tax increase", and stated their belief "that American involvement in Vietnam is morally wrong".

==== 1970s ====
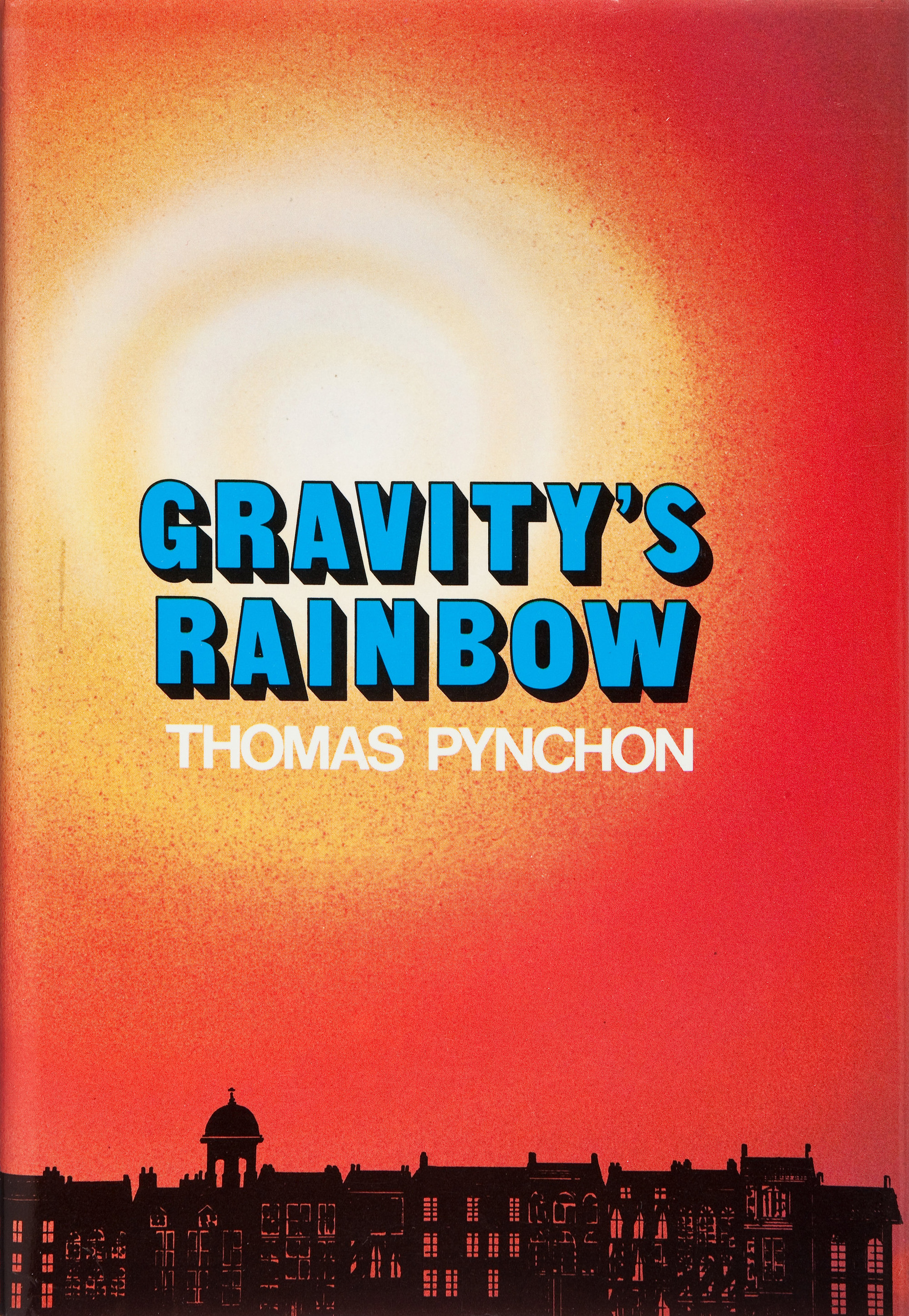
Gravity's Rainbow (1973)

Pynchon's most famous novel is his third, Gravity's Rainbow, published in 1973. An intricate and allusive fiction that combines and elaborates on many of the themes of his earlier work, including preterition, paranoia, racism, colonialism, conspiracy, synchronicity, and entropy, it has generated a wealth of commentary and critical material, including reader's guides, books and scholarly articles, online concordances and discussions, and art works. Its artistic value is often compared to that of James Joyce's Ulysses. Some scholars have called it the greatest American post-World War II novel, and it has similarly been described as "literally an anthology of postmodernist themes and devices". Richard Locke, reviewing it in The New York Times, wrote, "Gravity's Rainbow is longer, darker and more difficult than his first two books; in fact it is the longest, most difficult and most ambitious novel to appear in these pages since Nabokov's Ada four years ago; its technical and verbal resources bring to mind Melville and Faulkner."

The major portion of Gravity's Rainbow takes place in Europe in the final months of World War II and the weeks immediately following V-E Day, and is narrated for the most part from within the historical moment in which it is set. In this way, Pynchon's text enacts a type of dramatic irony whereby neither the characters nor the various narrative voices are aware of specific historical circumstances, such as the Holocaust and, except as hints, premonitions and mythography, the complicity between Western corporate interests and the Nazi war machine, which figure prominently in readers' apprehensions of the novel's historical context. For example, at war's end the narrator observes: "There are rumors of a War Crimes Tribunal under way in Nürnberg. No one Slothrop has listened to is clear who's trying whom for what". Such an approach generates dynamic tension and moments of acute self-consciousness, as both reader and author seem drawn ever deeper into the "plot", in various senses of that term:

Pynchon presents us with a Disney-meets-Bosch panorama of European politics, American entropy, industrial history, and libidinal panic which leaves a chaotic whirl of fractal patterns in the reader's mind.

If they can get you asking the wrong questions, they don't have to worry about answers.

— Gravity's Rainbow

The novel invokes anti-authority sentiments, often through violations of narrative conventions and integrity. For example, as the protagonist, Tyrone Slothrop, considers that his own family "made its money killing trees", he apostrophizes his apology and plea for advice to the coppice within which he has momentarily taken refuge. In an overt incitement to eco-activism, Pynchon's narrative agency then has it that "a medium-sized pine nearby nods its top and suggests, 'Next time you come across a logging operation out here, find one of their tractors that isn't being guarded, and take its oil filter with you. That's what you can do.'"

Encyclopedic in scope and often self-conscious in style, the novel displays erudition in its treatment of an array of material drawn from the fields of psychology, chemistry, mathematics, history, religion, music, literature, human sexuality, and film. Pynchon wrote the first draft in "neat, tiny script on engineer's quadrille paper". He worked on the novel throughout the 1960s and early 1970s while living in California and Mexico City.

Gravity's Rainbow shared the 1974 National Book Award with A Crown of Feathers and Other Stories by Isaac Bashevis Singer (split award). That same year, the Pulitzer Prize for Fiction panel unanimously recommended Gravity's Rainbow for the award, but the Pulitzer board vetoed the recommendation, calling the novel "unreadable", "turgid", "overwritten", and in parts "obscene". No Pulitzer Prize for Fiction was awarded that year and finalists were not recognized before 1980. In 1975, Pynchon declined the William Dean Howells Medal. Along with Lot 49, Gravity's Rainbow was included on Time's list of the 100 greatest English-language novels published since the magazine's founding, with Lev Grossman and Richard Lacayao commenting on its "fantastic multitude of meditations upon the human need to build systems of intellectual order even as we use the same powers of intellect to hasten our destruction. (Did we mention that this is also a comedy, more or less?) Among American writers of the second half of the 20th century, Pynchon is the indisputed candidate for lasting literary greatness. This book is why."

His earliest American ancestor, William Pynchon, emigrated to the Massachusetts Bay Colony with the Winthrop Fleet in 1630, then became the founder of Springfield, Massachusetts, in 1636. Thereafter a long line of Pynchon descendants found wealth and repute on American soil. Deborah Madsen argues that Pynchon's ancestry and family background have partially inspired his fiction, particularly in the Slothrop family histories related in the short story "The Secret Integration" (1964) and Gravity's Rainbow.

=== Later career ===
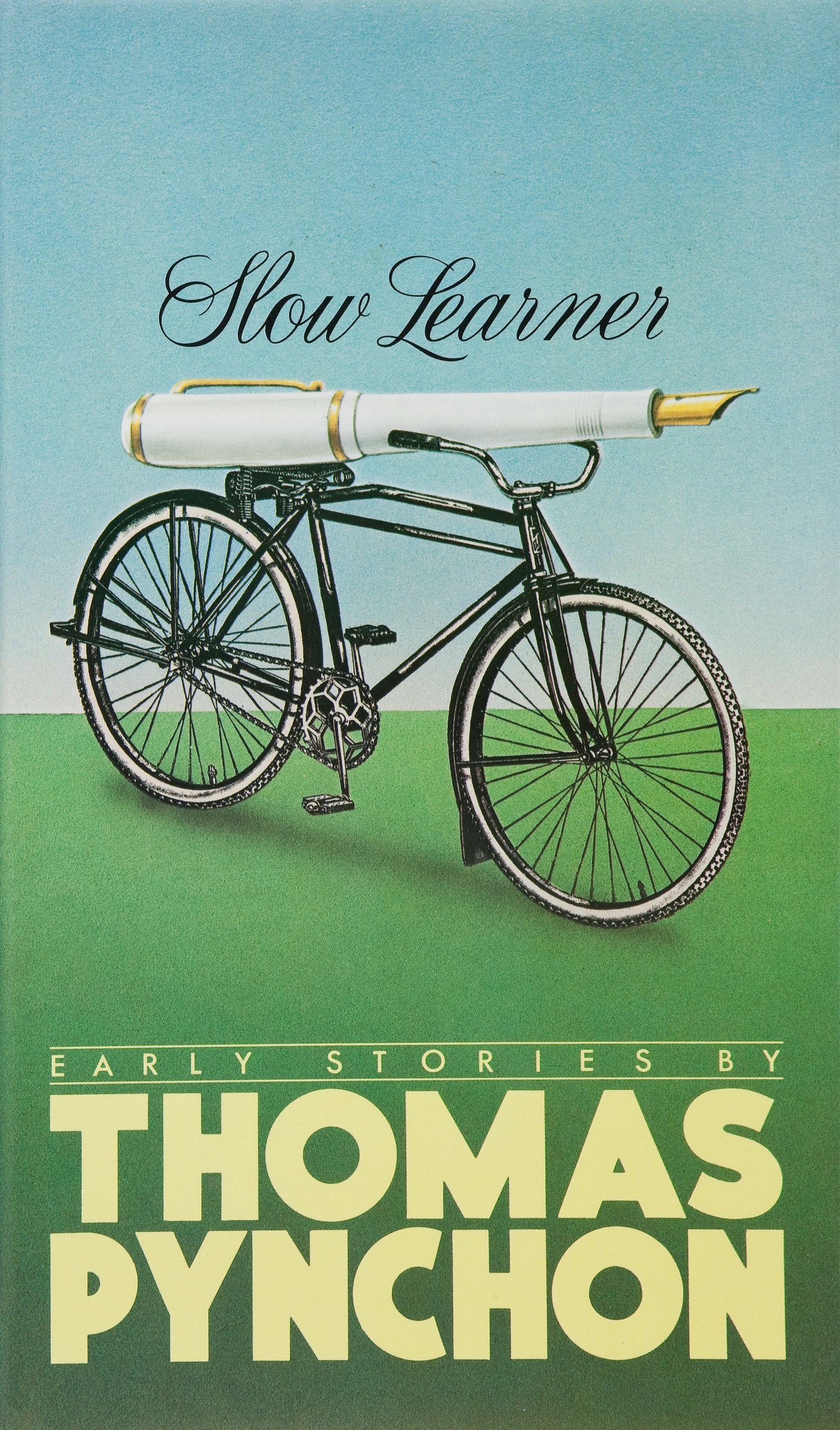
Slow Learner (1984)

A collection of Pynchon's early short stories, Slow Learner, was published in 1984, with a lengthy autobiographical introduction. Other short writings subsequently appeared in various publications as listed in the Thomas Pynchon bibliography page.

In 1988, Pynchon received a MacArthur Fellowship and, since the early 1990s at least, he has been frequently cited as a contender for the Nobel Prize in Literature.

In 2012, Pynchon's novels were released in e-book format, ending a long holdout by the author. Publisher Penguin Press reported that the novels' length and complex page layouts made it a challenge to convert them to a digital format.

==== Vineland ====
Pynchon's fourth novel, Vineland, was published in 1990 and disappointed some fans and critics. But it received a favorable review from Rushdie, who called it "free-flowing and light and funny and maybe the most readily accessible piece of writing the old Invisible Man ever came up with ... the entropy's still flowing, but there is something new to report, some faint possibility of redemption, some fleeting hints of happiness and grace. Thomas Pynchon, like Paul Simon's girl in New York City, who calls herself the Human Trampoline, is bouncing into Graceland." The novel is set in California in the 1980s and 1960s and describes the relationship between an FBI COINTELPRO agent and a radical filmmaker. Its strong sociopolitical undercurrents detail the battle between authoritarianism and communalism and the nexus between resistance and complicity, but with a typically Pynchonian sense of humor.

In 2025, Paul Thomas Anderson released the film One Battle After Another, inspired by plot points from Vineland.

==== Mason & Dixon ====
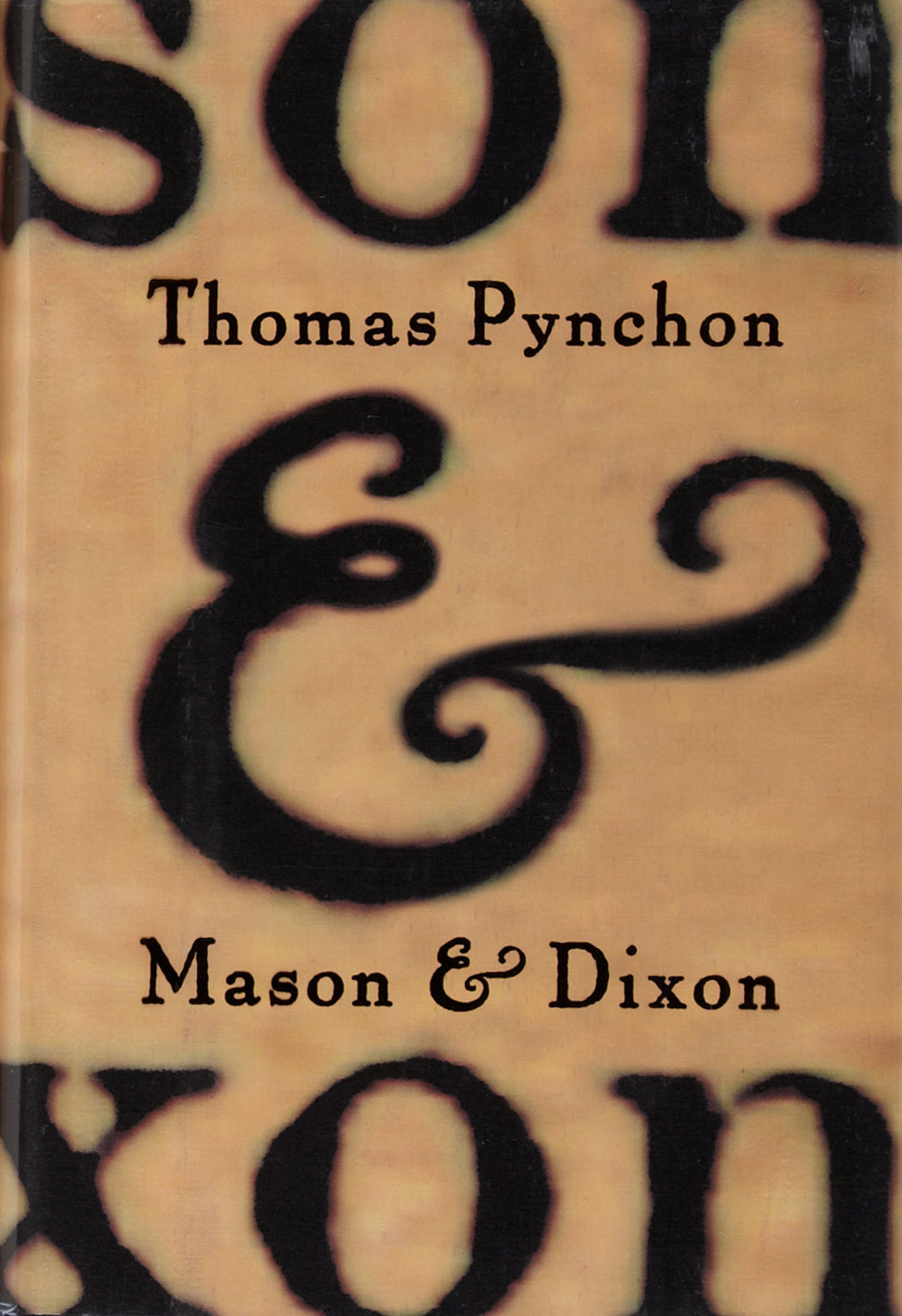
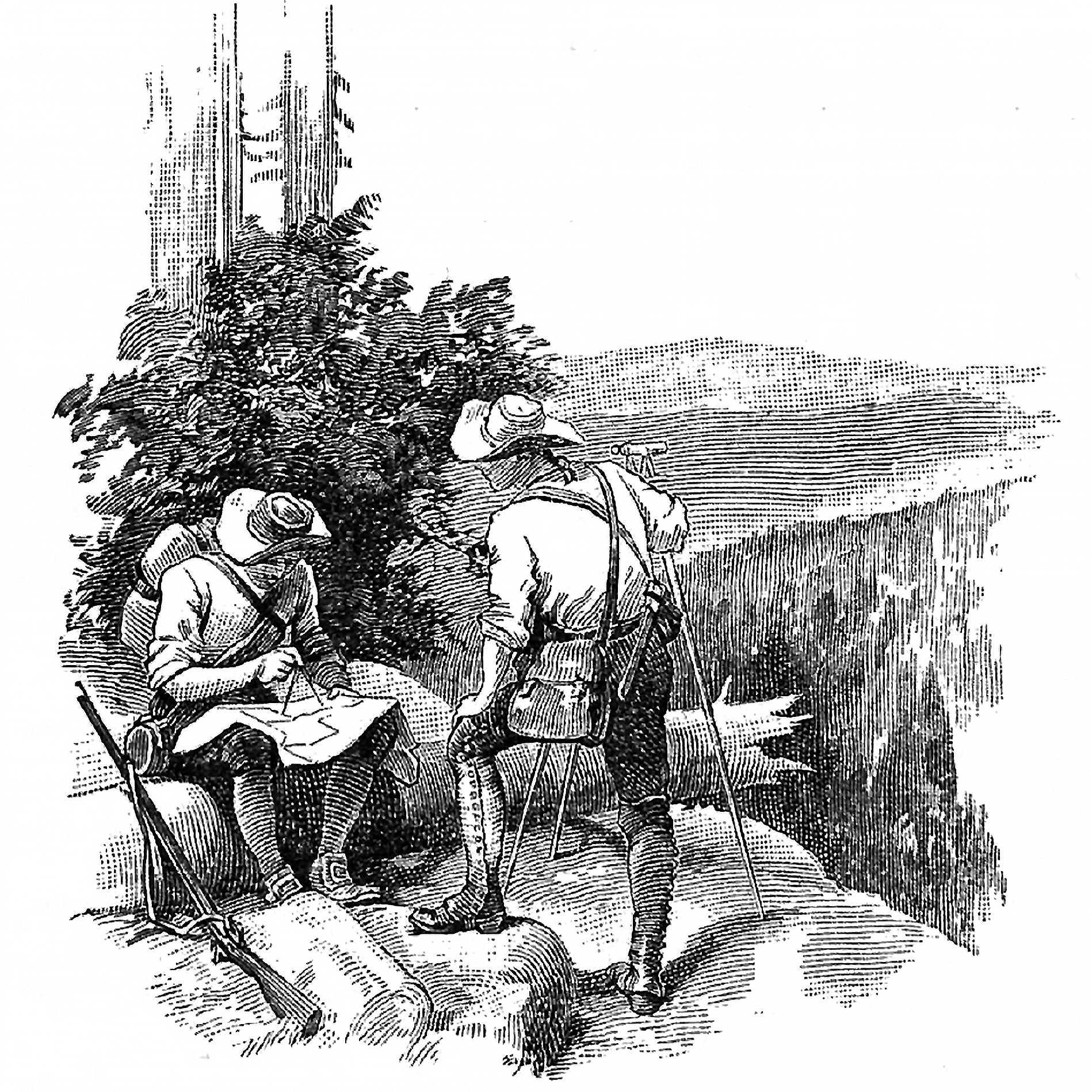
Mason & Dixon (1997) is a fictionalized account of the lives of Charles Mason and Jeremiah Dixon, the historical surveyors of the Mason–Dixon line.

The meticulously researched novel is a sprawling postmodernist saga recounting the lives and careers of the English astronomer Charles Mason and his partner, the surveyor Jeremiah Dixon, whose survey of the American West resulted in the Mason–Dixon line, during the birth of the American Republic. The dust jacket notes that it features appearances by George Washington, Benjamin Franklin, Samuel Johnson, and a talking dog. Some commentators acknowledged it as a welcome return to form; T. C. Boyle called it "the old Pynchon, the true Pynchon, the best Pynchon of all" and "a book of heart and fire and genius". Michiko Kakutani called Mason and Dixon Pynchon's most human characters, writing that they "become fully fleshed-out people, their feelings, hopes and yearnings made as palpably real as their outrageously comic high jinks".

Critic Harold Bloom hailed the novel as Pynchon's "masterpiece to date". Bloom named Pynchon as one of the four major American novelists of his time, along with Cormac McCarthy, Philip Roth, and Don DeLillo. For The Independent feature Book Of A Lifetime, Marek Kohn chose Mason & Dixon "precisely because my own teens were long gone by the time it came out: it showed me that being exhilarated by prose is not just an effect of youthful overexcitement".

==== Against the Day ====
Various rumors about the subject matter of Against the Day circulated for years. Most specific of these were comments made by the former German minister of culture Michael Naumann, who said he assisted Pynchon in his research about "a Russian mathematician [who] studied for David Hilbert in Göttingen", and that the new novel would trace the life and loves of Sofia Kovalevskaya.

In July 2006, a new, untitled novel by Pynchon was announced along with a description by Pynchon: "Spanning the period between the Chicago World's Fair of 1893 and the years just after World War I, this novel moves from the labor troubles in Colorado to turn-of-the-century New York, to London and Gottingen, Venice and Vienna, the Balkans, Central Asia, Siberia at the times of the mysterious Tunguska Event, Mexico during the Revolution, postwar Paris, silent-era Hollywood, and one or two places not strictly speaking on the map at all. With a worldwide disaster looming just a few years ahead, it is a time of unrestrained corporate greed, false religiosity, moronic fecklessness, and evil intent in high places. No reference to the present day is intended or should be inferred." He promised cameos by Nikola Tesla, Bela Lugosi, and Groucho Marx, as well as "stupid songs" and "strange sexual practices". Subsequently, the title of the new book was reported to be Against the Day and a Penguin spokesperson confirmed that the synopsis was Pynchon's.

Against the Day was released on November 21, 2006, and is 1,085 pages long in the first edition hardcover. The book was given almost no promotion by Penguin and professional book reviewers were given little time to review it. An edited version of Pynchon's synopsis was used as the jacket-flap copy and Kovalevskaya does appear, although as only one of over a hundred characters.

Composed in part of a series of interwoven pastiches of popular fiction genres from the era in which it is set, the novel inspired mixed reactions from critics and reviewers. One reviewer remarked, "It is brilliant, but it is exhaustingly brilliant." Other reviewers called Against the Day "lengthy and rambling" and "a baggy monster of a book", while negative appraisals condemned the novel for its "silliness" or characterized its action as "fairly pointless" and remained unimpressed by its "grab bag of themes".

==== Inherent Vice ====
Inherent Vice was published in August 2009.

A synopsis and brief extract from the novel, along with its title and dust jacket image, were printed in Penguin Press's summer 2009 catalogue. The book was advertised by the publisher as "part-noir, part-psychedelic romp, all Thomas Pynchon—private eye Doc Sportello comes, occasionally, out of a cannabis haze to watch the end of an era as free love slips away and paranoia creeps in with the L.A. fog." A promotional video for the novel was released by Penguin Books on August 4, 2009, with the character voiceover narrated by Pynchon. A 2014 film adaptation of the same name was directed by Paul Thomas Anderson.

==== Bleeding Edge ====
Bleeding Edge takes place in Manhattan's Silicon Alley during "the lull between the collapse of the dot-com boom and the terrible events of September 11". The novel was published on September 17, 2013, to mixed reviews.

==== Shadow Ticket ====
In April 2025, Penguin Press announced a new novel by Pynchon, Shadow Ticket, with a synopsis, which was published on October 7, 2025. The novel, which is set in 1932, centers on a Milwaukee private investigator who is set adrift in Hungary while tracking the heiress to a Wisconsin cheese fortune.

== Artistry ==
=== Themes and motifs ===
Critic Michiko Kakutani identified a central theme connecting all of Pynchon's novels: "Is the world dominated by conspiracy or chaos? Are there patterns, secret codes, hidden agendas—in short, a hidden design—to the bubble and turmoil of human existence, or is it all a product of chance?" Pynchon's work explores philosophical, theological, and sociological ideas exhaustively, though in quirky and approachable ways. His writings demonstrate a strong affinity with the practitioners and artifacts of low culture, including comic books and cartoons, pulp fiction, popular films, television programs, cookery, urban myths, conspiracy theories, and folk art. This blurring of the conventional boundary between "high" and "low" culture has been seen as one of the defining characteristics of his writing.

Pynchon makes frequent musical allusions. McClintic Sphere in V. is a composite of jazz musicians such as Ornette Coleman, Charlie Parker and Thelonious Monk. In The Crying of Lot 49, the lead singer of the Paranoids sports "a Beatle haircut" and sings with an English accent. In the closing pages of Gravity's Rainbow, there is an apocryphal report that Tyrone Slothrop, the novel's protagonist, played kazoo and harmonica as a guest musician on a record released by the Fool in the 1960s (having magically recovered the latter instrument, his "harp", in a German stream in 1945, after losing it down the toilet in 1939 at the Roseland Ballroom in Roxbury, Boston, to the strains of the jazz standard "Cherokee", upon which tune Charlie Parker was simultaneously inventing bebop in New York, as Pynchon describes). In Vineland, both Zoyd Wheeler and Isaiah Two Four are also musicians: Zoyd played keyboards in a '60s surf band called the Corvairs, while Isaiah played in a punk band called Billy Barf and the Vomitones. In Mason & Dixon, one of the characters plays on the Clavier the varsity drinking song that will later become "The Star-Spangled Banner"; while in another episode a character remarks tangentially "Sometimes, it's hard to be a woman." He also alludes to classical music; in V., a character sings an aria from Mozart's Don Giovanni. In Lot 49 Oedipa listens to "the Fort Wayne Settecento Ensemble's variorum recording of the Vivaldi Kazoo Concerto, Boyd Beaver, soloist." In his introduction to Slow Learner, Pynchon acknowledges a debt to the anarchic bandleader Spike Jones, and in 1994, he penned a 3,000-word set of liner notes for the album Spiked!, a collection of Jones's recordings released on the short-lived BMG Catalyst label. Pynchon also wrote the liner notes for Nobody's Cool, the second album of indie rock band Lotion, in which he states that "rock and roll remains one of the last honorable callings, and a working band is a miracle of everyday life. Which is basically what these guys do." He is known to be a fan of Roky Erickson.

Investigations and digressions into human sexuality, psychology, sociology, mathematics, science, and technology recur throughout Pynchon's works. One of his earliest short stories, "Low-lands" (1960), features a meditation on Heisenberg's uncertainty principle as a metaphor for telling stories about one's own experiences. His next published work, "Entropy" (1960), introduced the concept which was to become synonymous with Pynchon's name (though Pynchon later admitted the "shallowness of [his] understanding" of the subject, and noted that choosing an abstract concept first and trying to construct a narrative based on it was "a lousy way to go about writing a story"). Another early story, "Under the Rose" (1961), includes among its cast of characters a cyborg set anachronistically in Victorian-era Egypt (a precursor of what is now called steampunk). This story, significantly reworked by Pynchon, appears as Chapter 3 of V. "The Secret Integration" (1964), Pynchon's last published short story, is a sensitively handled coming-of-age tale in which a group of young boys face the consequences of the American policy of racial integration. At one point in the story, the boys attempt to understand the new policy by way of the mathematical operation, the only sense of the word with which they are familiar.

The Crying of Lot 49 also alludes to entropy and communication theory, and contains scenes and descriptions which parody or appropriate calculus, Zeno's paradoxes, and the thought experiment known as Maxwell's demon. At the same time, the novel also investigates homosexuality, celibacy and both medically sanctioned and illicit psychedelic drug use. Gravity's Rainbow describes many varieties of sexual fetishism (including sado-masochism, coprophilia and a borderline case of tentacle erotica), and features numerous episodes of drug use, most notably cannabis but also cocaine, naturally occurring hallucinogens, and the mushroom Amanita muscaria. Gravity's Rainbow also derives much from Pynchon's background in mathematics: at one point, the geometry of garter belts is compared with that of cathedral spires, both described as mathematical singularities. Mason & Dixon explores the scientific, theological, and socio-cultural foundations of the Age of Reason while also depicting the relationships between actual historical figures and fictional characters in intricate detail and, like Gravity's Rainbow, is an archetypal example of the genre of historiographic metafiction.

=== Style ===
Pynchon's prose, with its wide range of styles and subjects, is commonly classified as postmodern. Poet L. E. Sissman wrote in The New Yorker: "He is almost a mathematician of prose, who calculates the least and the greatest stress each word and line, each pun and ambiguity, can bear, and applies his knowledge accordingly and virtually without lapses, though he takes many scary, bracing linguistic risks. Thus his remarkably supple diction can first treat of a painful and delicate love scene and then roar, without pause, into the sounds and echoes of a drugged and drunken orgy." Pynchon often engages in parodies or pastiches of other styles; Mason & Dixon is written in the style of the eighteenth-century, when it takes place. Anthony Lane, reviewing the novel in The New Yorker, writes that "It sounds and, more important, looks like a period novel; it comes bedecked with archaic spellings, complex punctuation, words like 'Nebulosity,' 'Fescue,' 'pinguid,' and 'G-d.' ... This is hard to fault as pastiche, and yet it moves beyond pastiche, with none of the cramped self-amusement that usually attends the genre."

Pynchon makes frequent allusions to other authors; in the introduction to Slow Learner, a collection of his early short stories, he acknowledges his debts to the modernists, especially T. S. Eliot's The Waste Land, and to the Beats, particularly Jack Kerouac's On the Road. He also writes of the influence of jazz and rock and roll, and satiric song lyrics and mock musical numbers are a trademark of his fiction. In his essay "Smoking Dope with Thomas Pynchon: A Sixties Memoir", Andrew Gordon writes: "Kerouac's heroes were filled with romantic angst and an unfulfilled yearning to burn like roman candles, whereas Pynchon's were clowns, schlemiels and human yo-yos, bouncing between farce and paranoia. Kerouac was of the cool fifties; he wrote jazz fiction. But Pynchon was of the apocalyptic sixties; he wrote rock and roll."

=== Precursors and influences ===
Pynchon's novels refer overtly to writers as disparate as Henry Adams (in V., p. 62), Jorge Luis Borges (in Gravity's Rainbow, p. 264), Deleuze and Guattari (in Vineland, p. 97), Emily Dickinson (in Gravity's Rainbow, pp. 27–8), Umberto Eco (in Mason & Dixon, p. 559), Ralph Waldo Emerson (in Vineland, p. 369), "Hopkins, T. S. Eliot, di Chirico's novel Hebdomeros" (in V., p. 307), William March, Vladimir Nabokov (in The Crying of Lot 49, p. 120), Patrick O'Brian (in Mason & Dixon, p. 54), Ishmael Reed (in Gravity's Rainbow, p. 558), Rainer Maria Rilke (in Gravity's Rainbow, p. 97 f) and Ludwig Wittgenstein (in V., p. 278 f), and to a heady mixture of iconic religious and philosophical sources.

Critics have made comparisons of Pynchon's writing with works by Rabelais, Cervantes, Laurence Sterne, Edgar Allan Poe, Nathaniel Hawthorne, Herman Melville, Charles Dickens, Joseph Conrad, Thomas Mann, William S. Burroughs, Ralph Ellison, Patrick White, and Toni Morrison.

Pynchon's work also has similarities with modernist writers who wrote long novels dealing with large metaphysical or political issues, such as James Joyce's Ulysses, E. M. Forster's A Passage to India, Wyndham Lewis's The Apes of God, Robert Musil's The Man Without Qualities and John Dos Passos's U.S.A. trilogy. A strong influence can be discerned of Vladimir Nabokov's The Real Life of Sebastian Knight on Pynchon's first novel V., which resembles Nabokov's novel in plot, character, narration and style, and whose title alludes directly to Nabokov's narrator "V." Pynchon also outlines the influence on his own early fiction of literary works by Ernest Hemingway, Henry Miller, Saul Bellow, Herbert Gold, Philip Roth, Norman Mailer, John Buchan and Graham Greene, and non-fiction works by Helen Waddell, Norbert Wiener and Isaac Asimov.

== Legacy and influence ==
Pynchon's work has been cited as an influence and inspiration by many writers, among them Elfriede Jelinek (who translated Gravity's Rainbow into German), David Foster Wallace, William T. Vollmann, Richard Powers, Steve Erickson, David Mitchell, Neal Stephenson, Dave Eggers, William Gibson, T. C. Boyle, Salman Rushdie, Alan Moore, and Tommaso Pincio (whose pseudonym is an Italian rendering of Pynchon's name).

Thanks to his influence on Gibson and Stephenson in particular, Pynchon became one of the progenitors of cyberpunk fiction; a 1987 essay in Spin magazine by Timothy Leary explicitly named Gravity's Rainbow as the "Old Testament" of cyberpunk, with Gibson's Neuromancer and its sequels as the "New Testament". Though the term "cyberpunk" did not become prevalent until the early 1980s, since Leary's article many readers have retroactively included Gravity's Rainbow in the genre, along with other works—Samuel R. Delany's Dhalgren and many works of Philip K. Dick—which seem, in hindsight, to anticipate cyberpunk styles and themes. The encyclopedic nature of Pynchon's novels also led to some attempts to link his work with the hypertext fiction movement of the 1990s.

Ian Rankin, author of the Inspector Rebus mystery novels, called encountering Pynchon in college "a revelation": "Pynchon seemed to fit the model I was learning of literature as an extended code or grail quest. Moreover, he was like a drug: as you worked out one layer of meaning, you quickly wanted to move to the next. He wrote action novels about spies and soldiers which also happened to be detective stories and bawdy romps. ... His books were picaresquely post-modern and his humour was Marxian (tendance: Groucho). On page six of The Crying of Lot 49, the name Quackenbush appears, and you know you are in safely comedic hands."

The main-belt asteroid 152319 is named after Pynchon.

In 2025, after the publication of Shadow Ticket and the release of One Battle After Another (a film adaptation of Vineland), Parul Sehgal wrote, "beginning with his novels V. (1963) and The Crying of Lot 49 (1966) and Gravity's Rainbow (1973), Pynchon unleashed a vision of America that now feels all too familiar—a world swathed in conspiracy and trawled by self-appointed sleuths parsing every passing signal and sign, their paths lit by the bright beam of their own righteousness."

== Other work and activities ==
Pynchon has published a number of articles and reviews in the mainstream American media, including words of support for Salman Rushdie and his then-wife, Marianne Wiggins, after the fatwa was pronounced against Rushdie by the Iranian leader Ayatollah Ruhollah Khomeini. The next year, Rushdie's enthusiastic review of Pynchon's Vineland prompted Pynchon to send him another message hinting that if Rushdie were ever in New York, the two should arrange a meeting. Eventually, the two did have dinner together. Rushdie later commented: "He was extremely Pynchon-esque. He was the Pynchon I wanted him to be".

During the 1990s, Pynchon befriended members of the band Lotion and wrote liner notes for the band's 1995 album Nobody's Cool. Although the band initially claimed that he had seen them in concert and become a groupie, in 2009 they told The New Yorker that they met him through his accountant, who was drummer Rob Youngberg's mother; she gave him an advance copy of the album and he agreed to write the liner notes, only later seeing them in concert. Pynchon then conducted an interview with the band ("Lunch with Lotion") for Esquire in June 1996 in the lead-up to the publication of Mason & Dixon. Pynchon provided faxed answers to questions submitted by author David Hajdu and permitted excerpts from his personal correspondence to be quoted in Hajdu's 2001 book Positively 4th Street: The Lives and Times of Joan Baez, Bob Dylan, Mimi Baez Fariña and Richard Fariña.

In celebration of the centenary of George Orwell's birth, Pynchon wrote a new foreword to Orwell's Nineteen Eighty-Four. The introduction presents a brief biography of Orwell as well as a reflection on some of the critical responses to Nineteen Eighty-Four. Pynchon also offers his own reflection in the introduction that "what is perhaps [most] important, indeed necessary, to a working prophet, is to be able to see deeper than most of us into the human soul."

Shortly before Against the Day was published, Pynchon's prose appeared in the program for "The Daily Show: Ten Fu@#ing Years (The Concert)", a retrospective on Jon Stewart's comedy-news broadcast The Daily Show.

On December 6, 2006, Pynchon joined a campaign by many other major authors to clear Ian McEwan of plagiarism charges by sending a typewritten letter to his British publisher, which was published in The Daily Telegraph.

== Personal life ==
Relatively little is known about Pynchon's private life; he has carefully avoided contact with reporters for more than fifty years, and refuses the spectacle of celebrity and public appearances. Only a few photos of him are known to exist, nearly all from his high school and college days, and his whereabouts have often remained undisclosed. Around 1984, Pynchon wrote an introduction for his short story collection Slow Learner. His comments on the stories after reading them again for the first time in many years, and his recollection of the events surrounding their creation, amount to some of the author's only autobiographical comments to his readers.

Pynchon's personal absence from mass media has generated many rumors and apocryphal anecdotes. Some readers and critics have suggested that there were and are perhaps aesthetic (and ideological) motivations behind his choice to remain aloof from public life. For example, the protagonist in Janette Turner Hospital's short story "For Mr. Voss or Occupant" (published in 1991), explains to her daughter that she is writing

a study of authors who become reclusive. Patrick White, Emily Dickinson, J. D. Salinger, Thomas Pynchon. The way they create solitary characters and personae and then disappear into their fictions.

More recently, book critic Arthur Salm has written:

the man simply chooses not to be a public figure, an attitude that resonates on a frequency so out of phase with that of the prevailing culture that if Pynchon and Paris Hilton were ever to meet—the circumstances, I admit, are beyond imagining—the resulting matter/antimatter explosion would vaporize everything from here to Tau Ceti IV.

In 1990, Pynchon married his literary agent, Melanie Jackson—a great-granddaughter of Theodore Roosevelt and a granddaughter of Robert H. Jackson, U.S. Supreme Court Justice and Nuremberg trials prosecutor—and fathered a son, Jackson, in 1991. In 2013, Jackson Pynchon graduated from Columbia University, where he was affiliated with St. Anthony Hall.

Pynchon's niece is feminist author and sex educator Tristan Taormino.

In 1998, over 120 letters that Pynchon had written to his longtime agent, Candida Donadio, were donated by the family of a private collector, Carter Burden, to the Pierpont Morgan Library in New York City. The letters ranged from 1963 to 1982. The Morgan Library originally intended to allow scholars to view the letters, but at Pynchon's request the Burden family and Morgan Library agreed to seal them until after Pynchon's death.

In December 2022, the Huntington Library announced that it had acquired the literary archive, including typescripts and drafts of each of Pynchon's novels, handwritten notes, correspondence with publishers, and research.

=== Media scrutiny of private life ===
A 1963 review of V. in The New York Times Book Review described Pynchon as "a recluse" living in Mexico. After the publication and success of Gravity's Rainbow, interest mounted in finding out more about the identity of the author. At the 1974 National Book Awards ceremony, the president of Viking Press, Tom Guinzberg, arranged for double-talking comedian "Professor" Irwin Corey to accept the prize on Pynchon's behalf. Many of the assembled guests had no idea who Corey was and had never seen the author, so they assumed it was Pynchon himself on the stage delivering Corey's trademark torrent of rambling, pseudo-scholarly verbiage. Toward the end of Corey's address a streaker ran through the hall, adding further to the confusion.

An article by John Batchelor published in the SoHo Weekly News in 1977 claimed that Pynchon was in fact J. D. Salinger. Pynchon's written response to this theory said that "some of it was true, but none of the interesting parts. Not bad. Keep trying."

Thereafter, the first piece to provide substantial information about Pynchon's personal life was a biographical account written by a former Cornell University friend, Jules Siegel, and published in Playboy magazine. In his article, Siegel reveals that Pynchon had a complex about his teeth and underwent extensive and painful reconstructive surgery, was nicknamed "Tom" at Cornell and attended Mass diligently, acted as best man at Siegel's wedding, and that he later also had an affair with Siegel's wife. Siegel recalls Pynchon saying he did attend some of Vladimir Nabokov's lectures at Cornell but that he could hardly make out what Nabokov was saying because of his thick Russian accent. Siegel also records Pynchon's commenting: "Every weirdo in the world is on my wavelength", an observation borne out by the crankiness and zealotry that have attached themselves to his name and work in subsequent years.

The disclosure of Pynchon's 1990s location in New York City, after many years in which he was believed to be dividing his time between Mexico and northern California, led some journalists and photographers to try to track him down. Shortly before the publication of Mason & Dixon in 1997, a CNN camera crew filmed him in Manhattan. Angered by this invasion of his privacy, he called CNN asking that he not be identified in the footage of the street scenes near his home. When asked by CNN, Pynchon rejected their characterization of him as a recluse, saying, "My belief is that 'recluse' is a code word generated by journalists ... meaning, 'doesn't like to talk to reporters'." CNN also quoted him as saying, "Let me be unambiguous. I prefer not to be photographed." The next year, a reporter for the Sunday Times managed to snap a photo of him as he was walking with his son.

On November 6, 2018, Pynchon was photographed near his apartment in New York's Upper West Side district when he went to vote with his son. The photo was published by the National Enquirer and was said to be the first photo of him "in decades".

After several references to Pynchon's work and reputation were made on NBC's The John Larroquette Show, Pynchon (through his agent) reportedly contacted the series' producers to offer suggestions and corrections. When a local Pynchon sighting became a major plot point in a 1994 episode of the series, Pynchon was sent the script for his approval; as well as providing the title of a fictitious work to be used in one episode ("Pandemonium of the Sun"), Pynchon apparently vetoed a final scene that called for an extra playing him to be filmed from behind, walking away from the shot. Pynchon also insisted that it should be specifically mentioned in the episode that he was seen wearing a Roky Erickson T-shirt. According to the Los Angeles Times, this spurred an increase in sales of Erickson's albums.

Pynchon's insistence on maintaining his personal privacy and on having his work speak for itself has resulted in a number of outlandish rumors and hoaxes over the years. Indeed, claims that Pynchon was the Unabomber or a sympathizer with the Waco Branch Davidians after the 1993 siege were upstaged in the mid-1990s by the invention of an elaborate rumor that Pynchon and one "Wanda Tinasky" were the same person. A collection of the Tinasky letters was eventually published as a paperback book in 1996; Pynchon denied having written the letters, and no direct attribution of the letters to him was ever made. "Literary detective" Donald Foster subsequently showed that the Letters were in fact written by an obscure Beat writer, Tom Hawkins, who had murdered his wife and then committed suicide in 1988. Foster's evidence was conclusive, including finding the typewriter on which the "Tinasky" letters had been written.

=== Media appearances ===
Pynchon depicted in The Simpsons episode "Diatribe of a Mad Housewife". His Simpsons appearances are some of the few occasions that Pynchon's voice has been broadcast in the media.

Responding to the image which has been manufactured in the media over the years, Pynchon made two cameo animated appearances on the television series The Simpsons in 2004. The first occurs in the episode "Diatribe of a Mad Housewife", in which Marge Simpson becomes a novelist. He plays himself, with a paper bag over his head, and provides a blurb for Marge's book, speaking in a broad Long Island accent: "Here's your quote: 'Thomas Pynchon loved this book, almost as much as he loves cameras!'" He then starts yelling at passing cars: "Hey, over here, have your picture taken with a reclusive author! Today only, we'll throw in a free autograph! But, wait! There's more!"

In his second appearance, in "All's Fair in Oven War", Pynchon's dialogue consists entirely of puns on his novel titles ("These wings are V-licious! I'll put this recipe in The Gravity's Rainbow Cookbook, right next to 'The Frying of Latke 49'."). The cartoon representation of Pynchon reappears in a third, non-speaking cameo, as a guest at the fictional WordLoaf convention depicted in the 18th season episode "Moe'N'a Lisa". It first aired on November 19, 2006, the Sunday before Against the Day was released. According to Al Jean on the 15th season DVD episode commentary, Pynchon wanted to do the series because his son was a big fan.

During pre-production of "All's Fair in Oven War", Pynchon faxed one page from the script to producer Matt Selman with several handwritten edits to his lines. Of particular emphasis was Pynchon's outright refusal to utter the line "No wonder Homer is such a fat-ass." Pynchon's objection apparently had nothing to do with the salty language. He wrote in a footnote to the edit, "Homer is my role model and I can't speak ill of him."

Pynchon's 2009 YouTube promotional teaser for the novel Inherent Vice is the second time a recording of his voice has been released to mainstream outlets (the first being his appearances on The Simpsons).

In September 2014, Josh Brolin told The New York Times that Pynchon had made a cameo in the Inherent Vice film adaptation. This led to a sizable online hunt for the author's appearance, eventually targeting actor Charley Morgan, whose small role as a doctor led many to believe he was Pynchon. Morgan, son of M*A*S*H's Harry Morgan, claimed that Paul Thomas Anderson, whom he described as a friend, had told him that such a cameo did not exist. Despite this, nothing has been directly confirmed by Anderson or Warner Bros. Pictures.

== Bibliography ==
- V. (1963)
- The Crying of Lot 49 (1966)
- Gravity's Rainbow (1973)
- Slow Learner (1984), collection of previously published short stories
- Vineland (1990)
- Mason & Dixon (1997)
- Against the Day (2006)
- Inherent Vice (2009)
- Bleeding Edge (2013)
- Shadow Ticket (2025)
