= Lotion (disambiguation) =

Lotion is a skincare product.

Lotion may also refer to:

- Lotion (band), a New York City band
- Lotion (EP), an eponymous album by the band Lotion
- "Lotion", a song by Greenskeepers
- "Lotion", a song by Deftones
