= The Telephone Album =

✆

Studio album by Lotion
- Released: March 10, 1998
- Recorded: Big House, New York City, New York, United States
- Genre: Alternative rock, indie rock
- Length: 48:32
- Language: English
- Label: spinART
- Producer: Lotion with Mark Mason

Lotion chronology
Nobody's Cool (1996)	✆ (1998)

Professional ratings
Review scores
Source	Rating
AllMusic	3/5 stars

✆ is the third and final studio album by Lotion, released in 1998. While commonly referred to as The Telephone Album, the name of the album is the symbol for a telephone.

The band supported the album by performing one of its tracks on an episode of Buffy the Vampire Slayer.

== Critical reception ==
The Guardian called the album "a delirious tour de force of quiet- loud bouncy-castle riffs, backwards tape-loops, and trippy narcissistic lyrics." The Stuart News concluded that "Lotion update punk's aggression with singalong tunes and tight musicianship ... their clever lyrics, timely subjects and hipster inclinations remove them from the identikit sameness that robs most modern rock bands." The Record deemed The Telephone Album "the group's most accessible release yet, mixing power pop ('I Love Me, Vol. 1') and glam ('My Name Is Prince') leanings with snippets of Queen- and ELO-inspired pop bliss."

AllMusic wrote that "hook after hook and melody after melody are delivered in Tony Zajkowski's relaxed and unaffected style of singing."

== Track listing ==
All songs composed by Lotion

1. "Rich Cop, Poor Cop" – 3:41
2. "Feedback Queen" – 3:28
3. "I Love Me (Vol. 1)" – 4:08
4. "No. 99" – 4:27
5. "Mr. Mosquito" – 3:49
6. "Glorified" – 5:44
7. "Mister President" – 3:48
8. "My Name Is Prince" – 3:31
9. "Drop-Dead" – 3:03
10. "West of Here" – 5:18
11. "Blackjack" – 2:42
12. "5th Fret, Distant Cousin" – 4:47

Bonus track on some editions

13. "Rock Chick" – 5:33

== Personnel ==
- Bill Ferguson – bass and vocals
- Jim Ferguson – guitar and vocals
- Rob Youngberg – drums and vocals
- Tony Zajkowski – vocals and guitar
