= Shadow Ticket =

2025 novel by Thomas Pynchon

- Author: Thomas Pynchon
- Language: English
- Genre: Postmodern, detective fiction
- Published: October 7, 2025 (Penguin Press)
- Publication place: United States
- Media type: Print (Hardback)
- Pages: 304
- ISBN: 978-1-59420-610-8

Shadow Ticket is a novel by the American author Thomas Pynchon. It was announced by Penguin Press in April 2025 and published in October the same year. The novel, which is set in 1932, centers on a Milwaukee private investigator who is set adrift in Hungary while tracking the heiress to a Wisconsin cheese fortune.

Shadow Ticket is Pynchon's tenth work and his first in 12 years since Bleeding Edge in 2013.

== Plot ==
In 1932, Hicks McTaggart is a private detective working for the agency Unamalgamated Ops in Milwaukee. A third party to the ongoing war between the federal government and the mafia, Hicks speaks freely with Milwaukeeans of all kinds, including Nazi bowlers, mafiosi, soda jerks, and a psychic secretary. Hicks is given the assignment to track down Daphne Airmont, daughter of the reclusive "Al Capone of Cheese" Bruno Airmont, along with Hop Wingdale, Daphne's paramour and a clarinetist for the swing band The Klezmopolitans. Although typically he avoids such assignments, Hicks' interest in Daphne's case comes from their association years ago, when he helped her escape a mad therapist via motorboat.

Soon after his love affair with songstress April Randazzo comes to the attention of the local 'Ndrangheta kingpin Don Peppino, two men disguised as elves make an attempt on McTaggart's life in the form of a gift-wrapped bomb. Facing additional pressure from federal agent T.P. O'Grizbee, Hicks reluctantly leaves Milwaukee. In New York, he is drugged and placed upon the boat the Stupendica, bound for Europe.

His search eventually carries him to Belgrade, where he comes in contact with the cocaine-loving Interpol officer Egon Praedinger, who recruits him in the hunt for Ace Lomax, Bruno Airmont's right-hand man. Praedinger sends him on to Budapest, where Hicks meets up with Dr. Zoltan von Kiss, an "apportist" with the ability to make objects disappear and reappear at will, and Terike, a female motorcycle courier. Hicks and Dr. von Kiss track down and repossess "La Lampa Plej Malbongusto", a lamp of especially poor taste, prized by collectors. Hicks catches Ace Lomax at gunpoint but decides to let him go free.

A few days later, Hicks' informer and foreign correspondent "Slide" Gearheart reveals that Daphne had been spotted at the Tropikus club in Budapest. They reunite and Daphne explains that the Klezmopolitans have broken up, and that she is still chasing Hop Wingdale, who has disappeared somewhere in Central Europe. With the help of a Czech golem named Zdenek, they find and rescue Hop and Ace Lomax from a Hungaro-Croatian terrorist training camp, deep in the territory of the anti-Semitic biker gang the Vladboys.

As the influence of Nazism begins to spread, all parties make their way to the port city of Fiume. Hop reveals to Daphne that he has been an undercover operative, and the two go their separate ways. Bruno gives Daphne the entire Airmont fortune and attempts to return to America in a U-boat, only to be informed that violent strikes have broken out nationwide, destroying the American dairy industry.

In the end, the upheaval in America culminates in a military coup where President Franklin D. Roosevelt is ousted by General MacArthur. Hicks receives news from abroad of Don Peppino and April's wedding, and decides to stay in Hungary with Terike. The novel closes with a letter from Skeet, describing his plans to travel west.

== Reception and interpretation ==
In a 2025 review written for The New Yorker, Kathryn Schulz noted the novel's prescience during Trump-era "Pynchonesque America" and mentions that the novel "lands in a moment when reality seems to have caught up with [Pynchon's] fictions." In her mixed review, she noted the lack of a clear message: "At some point, though, meaning that is sufficiently cryptic becomes indistinguishable from no meaning at all".

Dwight Garner in The New York Times also gave the novel a mixed reception. While enjoying Pynchon's wordplay, he found that the author's "timing and reflexes are not what they used to be" and called the novel "the least notable thing he's written".

In The Guardian, reviewer Xan Brooks noted that Pynchon, "albeit wryly and slyly", in the novel seems to connect the rise of fascism in 1930s Europe with the current times in the US, but found the novel "an antic mixed bag, a diverting tour of old haunts" that "runs wide but not deep".

More positively, Megan Nolan in The Telegraph called the novel "a masterpiece": "The fact that Shadow Ticket is brilliant and prescient isn’t a surprise; that it exudes so much joy and sensuousness is. To have had the career Pynchon has had, and still be so invigorated by your work, is all any novelist can ask."

Kirkus Reviews said, "Pynchon did the private dick thing to better effect in Inherent Vice (2009), a superior yarn in nearly every respect, so this one earns only an average grade — but then, middling Pynchon is better than a whole lot of writers’ best."
