= Slow Learner =

1984 collection of short stories by Thomas Pynchon

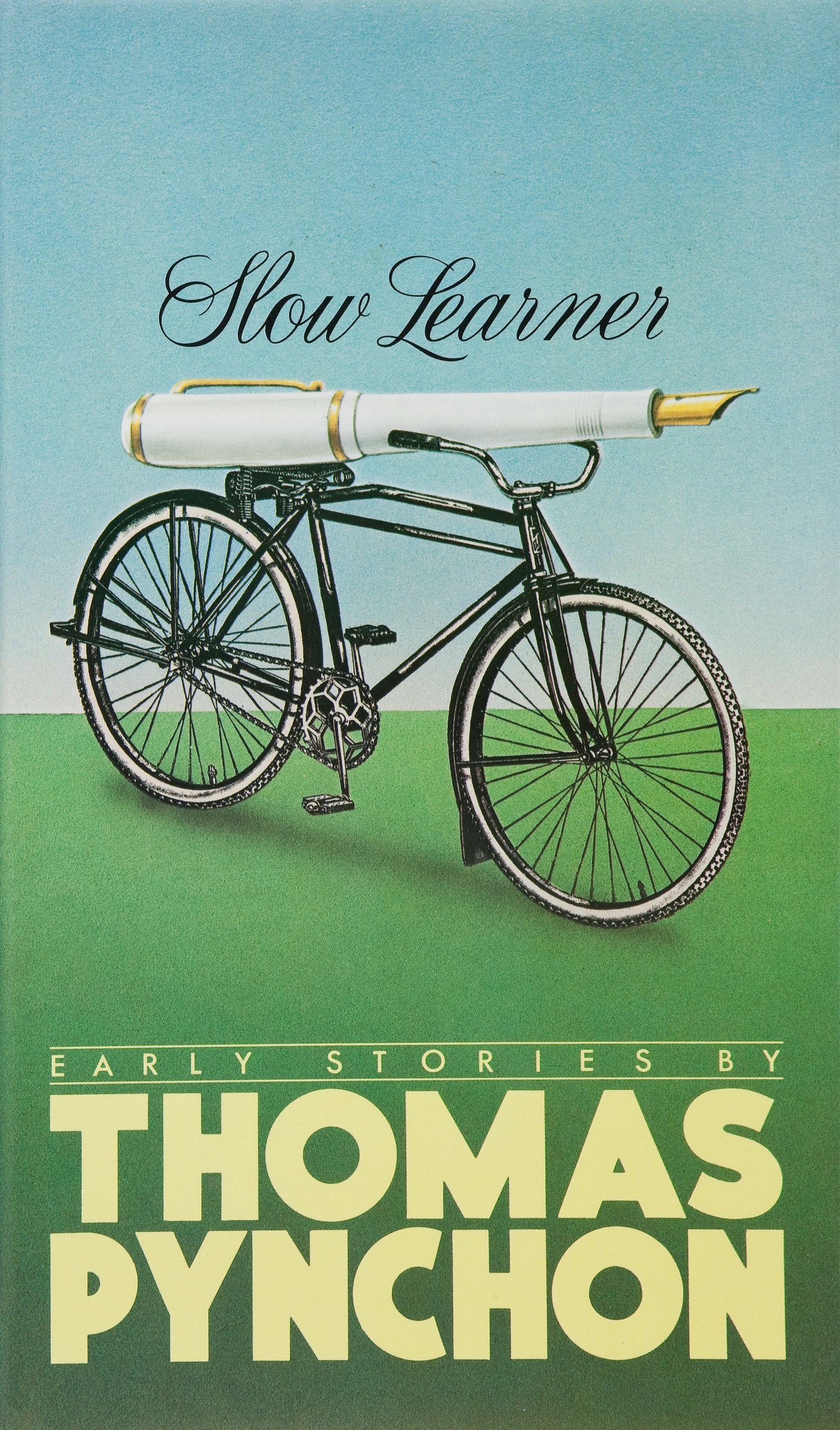
- First edition
- Author: Thomas Pynchon
- Language: English
- Genre: Short stories
- Publisher: Little, Brown
- Publication date: April 16, 1984
- Publication place: United States
- Media type: Print
- Pages: 193
- ISBN: 0-316-72442-4
- OCLC: 10348691
- Dewey Decimal: 813/.54 19
- LC Class: PS3566.Y55 S5 1984
- Preceded by: Gravity's Rainbow
- Followed by: Vineland

Slow Learner is the 1984 published collection of five early short stories by the American novelist Thomas Pynchon, originally published in various sources between 1959 and 1964.

The book is also notable for its introduction, written by Pynchon. His comments on the stories after reading them again for the first time in many years, and his recollection of the events surrounding their creation, amount to the author's only autobiographical comments to his readers.

== Content ==
- Introduction
- "The Small Rain" – First published in March 1959 in the Cornell Writer, No. 2, pp. 14–32.
- "Low-lands" – First published in New World Writing, No. 16, Philadelphia: Lippincott, on 16 March 1960, pp. 85–108.
- "Entropy" – First published in the Kenyon Review 22, No. 2, in Spring 1960, pp. 27–92.
- "Under the Rose" – First published in The Noble Savage 3 in May 1961, pp. 233–251.
- "The Secret Integration" – First published December 26, 1964 in The Saturday Evening Post 237 No. 45, pp. 36–37, 39, 42–44, 46–49, 51.

== Synopsis ==
=== "The Small Rain" ===
This was Pynchon's first published story. It centers around Nathan Levine, a lazy Specialist 3/C in the Army stationed at New Orleans who, along with several of his companions in the battalion are assigned to help with the cleanup at a small island named Creole, which has just been hit by a hurricane. He picks up dead bodies back at the island and after the horrific day of work, he heads back thinking about how to go forward with his life, if at all.

=== "Low-lands" ===
Dennis Flange, a lawyer at Wasp and Winsome, Attorneys at Law, calls into the office, telling them he's not coming in. What he's going to do instead is sit at home and drink wine with the neighborhood garbage man, Rocco Squarcione. As they sit and talk, Dennis's wife, Cindy, comes home and is noticeably frustrated by Dennis's afternoon activities. To make matters worse, an old rowdy Navy "friend" of the Flanges, named Pig Bodine, shows up in a stolen MG to see his old friend. At this, Cindy orders the three men off the premises. They all get in Rocco's garbage truck, and head down to the dump, patrolled by an old man named Bolingbroke. There, Dennis waxes philosophical about the dump, thinking of it as an allegory for his life up to that point, and possibly his life in the future. Rocco leaves for home, and Bolingbroke, Bodine, and Dennis turn in for the night, swapping sea stories as they doze off. Then, in the middle of the night, Dennis hears a woman's voice calling "Anglo! Anglo with the golden hair!". Realizing this is him, Dennis runs off into the dump looking for the woman. Remembering that Bolingbroke said that gypsies were in the area, Dennis wonders if the woman he's looking for is a gypsy. Then he sees her. She is the most beautiful woman he has ever seen... and is also three feet tall. She takes him to her home, tunneling deep into the dump, where she asks him to marry her. He declines, saying he is already married. To this, she starts crying, thinking Dennis won't take her. He then thinks she looks like a child, and that he always wanted children, but Cindy was too busy. He then tells her he'll stay... for a while.

=== "Entropy" ===
A weekend-long lease-breaking party devolves into disarray as Meatball Mulligan entertains a revolving door of cronies, servicemen, and jazz musicians while, in a hothouse room, Callisto and his lover Aubade ponder the everpresent condition of enclosed systems creating disorder while trying to nurse a baby bird back to health. The temperature outside remains 37 degrees Fahrenheit throughout the day, fueling apocalyptic paranoia in Callisto, who pontificates on the discoveries of the Laws of Thermodynamics, the Clausius theorem, and Gibbs and Boltzmann, finally deciding that entropy is an adequate metaphor to apply to American consumerist society, "a similar tendency from the least to the most probable, from differentiation to sameness, from ordered individuality to a kind of chaos." Meanwhile, Meatball juggles his attention between conversations about communication theory and personal relationships, keeping the musicians from smoking marijuana in his place, and the unexpected entrances of three coed philosophy majors lugging gallons of Chianti and, later, five sailors searching for a whorehouse. As the musicians discuss music theory, the girls and sailors chant drunken songs together, and childish chicanery break out all over, Meatball debates whether to hide in a closet until the party subsides its second wind or try to calm everyone down, one by one. He decides on the latter, patching up each out-of-control situation until the party tapers down to a din. Callisto's bird fails to improve under the unchanging conditions, which causes Aubade to smash out a window of the hothouse with her bare hands, displacing the constant temperature of inside and outside and leaving the story in a state of hovering uncertainty of where the next moment will lead.

=== "Under the Rose" ===
Two English spies, named Porpentine and Goodfellow, are sitting in a cafe in Upper Egypt. Their mission is to find out what their nemesis, Moldweorp, is up to in the area. Porpentine theorizes his plan is to assassinate the Consul-General, and so they travel to Cairo to intercept him, along with Goodfellow's new girlfriend, named Victoria Wren, her family, and a man named Bongo-Shaftsbury. During the trip, Bongo-Shaftsbury attempts to attack Victoria's younger sister Mildred, but Porpentine stops him. He then realizes that the man is a spy working for Moldweorp, and Bongo-Shaftsbury is put under guard. Upon reaching Cairo, the two men check into their hotels. The next morning, they head to the opera house where the Consul-General is a guest. Upon reaching their destination, they realize their hunch was correct, and Moldweorp and his spies are swarming the place. After Porpentine foils the assassination attempt, a chase across the streets of Cairo ensues. They reach the Sphinx, and exit their cabs, running across the desert. Porpentine and Goodfellow catch Moldweorp, and they talk a moment. Porpentine tells Goodfellow to return to the cab. He does, and a shot rings out. Turning around, he sees his companion face-down in the hot desert sand, as Moldweorp walks away. Sixteen years later, Goodfellow surveys a motorcade containing Archduke Franz Ferdinand, upon hearing rumors of a possible assassination. He's joined by his new girlfriend, a barmaid this time, who thinks of him as just a simple-minded Englishman, no good in bed but liberal with his money.

=== "The Secret Integration" ===
Grover Snodd and his friends Tim Santora, Carl Barrington (an African American), and Etienne Cherdlu, neighborhood kids from Mingeborough, Massachusetts, meet up at Grover's house one Saturday afternoon to discuss activities for the weekend. Their "Inner Junta" talk about planning elaborate practical jokes, financed by collecting milk money from school kids. The meeting adjourns to their secret hideout: the four of them depart, through a lush section of forest they dub King Yrjo's Woods, then down a stream aboard a refurbished flat-bottomed boat they christened the S.S. Leak, to the cellar of an abandoned manor known as "The Big House”. Here they solidify plans to infiltrate and disrupt a PTA meeting with smoke bombs and sodium/water explosions.

In a flashback, the failure of the group's previous year's operation is recalled: before he can fulfill his assigned task in that plan, Hogan Slothrop, an 8-years-sober AA member, gets a call to sit with another member who is alone and afraid. He and Tim go to the hotel where Mr. Carl McAfee, an African-American musician from Mississippi, is staying. Mr. McAfee eyes the situation with the kids and, chalking it up to a bad joke, sends them away and calls room service for a fifth of whiskey. Hogan steadfastly claims his seriousness and the kids stay to keep him company. Grover calls the hotel and asks to show up with Etienne. McAfee can't afford to pay for the bottle of whiskey, much less the room he's staying in, and breaks down into screaming and crying in his bed, passing out in-between fits. The police are called in to escort Mr. McAfee out as a vagrant, despite protests from the kids and Hogan's insistence that the man is sick, not a criminal.

Later that year, the Junta discusses their parents’ concerns about Carl Barrington's family's arrival, and how it will affect the neighborhood and community. In response to the word "integration" being thrown around, Grover, the boy genius, offers the calculus definition. A week later, Grover learns (and shares) the other meaning for “integration" (which he realizes is the meaning that the parents are using): white and black kids in the same schools. Carl's family is a sort of trigger for the gentrification of the area, an easy target, an explanation for the racist remarks made by Tim's mother and reflected around the neighborhood, and gives light to the mockery of Hogan's dispatch to Mr. McAfee's aid.

Returning to the present: when the boys walk Carl home from the secret hideout, and find that his yard has literally been trashed by their own parents, it is revealed that Carl, although accepted by the boys as a legitimate member of the Junta, is actually only an "imaginary playmate” (which explains earlier curious comments by adults). He is the means by which the boys attempt to come to terms with, and understand, their parents’ prejudices and actions. In the end, he can harmlessly evaporate until needed again.

== See also ==
- John Buchan
- John le Carré
- The Prince by Niccolò Machiavelli
- Surrealism
- To the Finland Station by Edmund Wilson
