= Full Isaac =

1994 album by Lotion

full Isaac

Studio album by Lotion
- Released: 1994
- Recorded: Zabriskie Point Studio, New York City, United States
- Genre: Alternative rock
- Length: 46:39
- Language: English
- Label: spinArt
- Producer: Kurt Ralske

Lotion chronology
full Isaac (1994)	Nobody's Cool (1996)

Singles from Album
- 1. "Head" Released: 1992; 2. "Tear" Released: 1993

Professional ratings
Review scores
Source	Rating
AllMusic	4/5 stars
The Encyclopedia of Popular Music	3/5 stars
MusicHound Rock: The Essential Album Guide	4/5 stars

full Isaac is the debut studio album by Lotion, released in 1994. The album was named in reference to The Love Boat.

== Critical reception ==
Trouser Press wrote that "Lotion’s songwriting isn’t yet strong enough to connect the dots of [the album's] eclectic canvas, and [Tony] Zajkowski lacks the vocal presence to hold the pieces together. As nice as the parts are, Full Isaac scatters at the mildest breeze." Uncut called the album "a fine debut."

The Village Voice selected full Isaac as a 1994 "Album of the Year."

== Track listing ==
All songs composed by Lotion

1. "Tear" – 4:17
2. "Dr. Link" – 4:01
3. "Paas" – 2:45
4. "La Boost" – 5:17
5. "Long" – 2:09
6. "Pajamas" – 5:03
7. "Around" – 6:03
8. "Head" – 3:45
9. "Dock Ellis" – 3:16
10. "She Is Weird City" – 4:59
11. "Love Theme from Santo Gold" – 5:04

== Personnel ==
Lotion

- Bill Ferguson – bass
- Jim Ferguson – guitar and vocals
- Rob Youngberg – drums
- Tony Zajkowski – vocals and guitar

Additional musicians

- Rasputina – cellos on "Around"
- Babe The Blue Ox – wisp vocals and alarms on "La Boost"; rumpus on "Dock Ellis"
- Tapan Modak – tabla on "Long"
