= Vineland =

1990 novel by Thomas Pynchon

- First edition
- Author: Thomas Pynchon
- Genre: Political satire, postmodern literature
- Published: February 1990 (Note: Vineland became available in bookstores in December 1989, six weeks before its official publication date of February 1990. The publisher distributed copies to reviewers on December 18, 1989. It debuted on The New York Times Best Seller list on January 21, 1990, reflecting sales for the week ending January 6.) (Little, Brown and Company)
- Publication place: United States
- Pages: 385 (Hardcover first edition)
- ISBN: 0-316-72444-0
- LC Class: PS3566.Y55 V5

Vineland is a 1990 postmodern novel by Thomas Pynchon set in California in 1984, the year of President Ronald Reagan's reelection. Through flashbacks, its characters, who lived through the 1960s, account for the free spirit of rebellion of that decade, and describe the traits of the "fascistic Nixonian repression" and the war on drugs that clashed with it. The book portrays transformations in U.S. society from the 1960s to the 1980s.

The novel provided the inspiration for the loosely-adapted script of the 2025 film One Battle After Another by director Paul Thomas Anderson.

== Plot ==
The story is set in California in 1984, the year of Ronald Reagan's reelection. After a scene in which former hippie Zoyd Wheeler dives through a window, something he is required to do yearly to keep receiving mental disability checks, the novel opens with the resurfacing of federal law enforcement and intelligence official Brock Vond, who, through a platoon of agents, forces Zoyd and his 14-year-old daughter Prairie out of their house. They hide from Brock, and from Hector Zuñiga, a DEA field agent from Zoyd's past, whom Zoyd suspects is in cahoots with Brock, with old friends of Zoyd's. Soon, Prairie accompanies her boyfriend Isaiah Two Four to a Mob wedding, where she runs into DL Chastain, a ninjette (Note: In "Pynchon's gag coinage", a "ninjette" is a female ninja.) and former family friend who, recognizing Prairie, explains Brock's motivation for coming after the Wheeler family.

This hinges heavily on Frenesi Gates, Prairie's mother, whom she has not seen since she was an infant. In the 1960s, during the height of the hippie era, the fictional College of the Surf (in equally fictional Trasero County, said to be between Orange County and San Diego County in Southern California) seceded from the U.S. and became the People's Republic of Rock and Roll (PR³), a nation of hippies and dope smokers. Brock intends to bring down PR³, and finds a willing accomplice in Gates. She is a member of 24fps, a militant film collective (another member of which, Ditzah, is telling Prairie the story in the present), that seeks to document the transgressions of the "fascists" against freedom and hippie ideals. Gates is uncontrollably attracted to Brock and ends up working as a double agent to bring about the killing of the de facto leader of PR³, Weed Atman (a mathematics professor who accidentally became the subject of a cult of personality).

Gates flees after her betrayal, and she has been living in witness protection with Brock's help up until the present day. Now she has disappeared. The membership of 24fps, Brock, and Hector are all searching for her, with various motives. The book's theme of the ubiquity of television (or the Tube) comes to a head when Hector, a Tube addict who has actually not been working with Brock, finds funding to create his pet project of an antidrug film telling a revised story of a "depraved" sixties, with Gates as the director. The pomp and circumstance surrounding this big-money deal create a net of safety that allows Gates to come out of hiding. 24fps finds her and achieves its goal of allowing Prairie to meet her, at an enormous reunion of Gates's family, the Traverses and Beckers (including one elder, Jess Traverse, who is a child in Pynchon's 2006 novel Against the Day). Meanwhile, DL Chastain and Takeshi Fumimota, her partner in "karma adjustment", are hanging out with Weed Atman and other Thanatoids — people who are in a state that is "like death, but different" — when they hear the news about Brock.

Brock, nearly omnipotent with federal funds, finds Prairie with a surveillance helicopter, and tries to snatch her up, claiming that he, not Zoyd, is really her father, but while he is hovering above her from a cable, the government abruptly cuts all his funding due to a loss of interest in funding the war on drugs because people have begun playing along willingly with the antidrug ideal, and his partner, Roscoe, flies the helicopter away. Brock immediately tries to take the helicopter back to Vineland by force, but he is ostensibly killed during his attempt, with Pynchon metaphorically describing his journey "across the river" with tow-truck drivers Blood and Vato, whom he calls to help get his "car" unstuck. Meanwhile, the family reunion and the Thanatoid bar celebrate news of Brock's disappearance, and the book ends with Prairie returning to the spot where Brock tried to abduct her, hoping for him to come back and get her after all.

== Critical reception ==
Vineland polarized critics at the time of its release. Author Tobias Meinel asserted in a 2013 essay that the novel "has led many critics to focus on its shift in style and content and to read it either as 'Pynchon Lite' or as a critical commentary on contemporary American culture." Salman Rushdie wrote a favorable review in The New York Times upon the book's release, calling it "free-flowing and light and funny and maybe the most readily accessible piece of writing the old Invisible Man ever came up with." He called it "that rarest of birds" that, "at the end of the Greed Decade", is "a major political novel about what America has been doing to itself, to its children, all these many years." Although he praised Pynchon's light-yet-deadly touch at tackling the nightmares of the present rather than the past, Rushdie acknowledged that the book "either grabs you or it doesn't."

British literary critic Frank Kermode was disappointed by the book, feeling that it lacked the "beautiful ontological suspense" of The Crying of Lot 49 or the "extended fictive virtuosity" of Gravity's Rainbow. He did acknowledge that it was "recognisably from the same workshop" as Pynchon's previous outings but found it less comprehensible. Brad Leithauser concurred, writing in The New York Review of Books that Vineland was "a loosely packed grab bag of a book" that recalled what was weakest about the author's canon and failed to extend or improve upon it. In the Chicago Tribune, James McManus posited that while inveterate Pynchon readers likely would unfavorably compare the book to Gravity's Rainbow, it was a manageable book with strong prose that succeeded as an arch and blackly amusing assault on Republican America.

Film critic Terrence Rafferty admired the novel, and in The New Yorker called it "the oldest story in the world—the original sin and the exile from Paradise", but author Sean Carswell later contended that aside from Rafferty and Rushdie, initial reviews of Vineland "run the gamut from slightly miffed to outright hostile." Edward Mendelson's review in The New Republic was mostly favorable; he found the plot tangled and tedious but praised Pynchon's "intellectual and imaginative energy" and called the book "a visionary tale" whose world was "richer and more various than the world of almost any American novel in recent memory." He also commended its "comic extravagance", writing, "no other American writer moves so smoothly and swiftly between the extremes of high and low style."

Mendelson additionally noted that Vineland was more integrated with its emotions and feelings than Pynchon's previous novels, and Jonathan Rosenbaum wrote in the Chicago Reader that it was the author's most hopeful work yet. That hopefulness was also mentioned by Rushdie, who believed the book suggested community, individuality, and family as counterweights to the repressive Nixon–Reagan era, but Dan Geddes opined in 2005 in The Satirist that the book's "happy ending" was surprising, given its overarching warning about a growing police state. Contrarily, Rushdie found that the shocking final scene lent itself to a morally ambiguous ending and felt the novel expertly held a balance between light and dark throughout.

== Film adaptation ==
Pynchon's novel was said by filmmaker Paul Thomas Anderson to be the loose inspiration for his 2025 film, One Battle After Another. Anderson has spoken many times of his love for, and desire to adapt, Vineland. In early 2024, he began filming a new project, confirmed later to be based on the novel. One Battle After Another was released in September 2025 and was nominated for 14 Academy Awards, winning six: Best Casting, Best Supporting Actor (Sean Penn), Best Adapted Screenplay, Best Film Editing, Best Director, and Best Picture.

In an early Q&A after a screening, Anderson mentioned that he struggled to conceptualize a proper adaptation of the book, stating "when you go to adapt it, you have to be much rougher on the book to adapt it. You have to kind of not be gentle."

Variety critic Andrew McGowan referred to the differences between the book and its film adaptation. While the film retains similar characters and character dynamics, he wrote, their names have been changed and the film is more straightforward than Pynchon's "avant-garde," "post modern" and "bizarre alternate reality."

== Sources ==
- Cowart, David (March 2012). "Pynchon in literary history". In Dalsgaard, Inger H.; Herman, Luc; McHale, Brian (eds.). The Cambridge Companion to Thomas Pynchon. Cambridge Companions to Literature (online ed.). Cambridge University Press. pp. 83–96. doi:10.1017/CCOL9780521769747. ISBN 978-1-139-01986-6.
- Knabb, Ken (2002). "Raptor, Rapist, Rapture: The Dark Joys of Social Control in Thomas Pynchon's Vineland".
- Patell, Cyrus R. K. (2001). Negative liberties: Morrison, Pynchon, and the problem of liberal ideology. Duke University Press.
