= Lotion (band) =

American indie rock band

- Origin: New York City, New York, United States
- Genres: Indie rock
- Years active: 1991–2001, 2011–2012, 2012–present
- Labels: Kokopop spinArt; Big Cat
- Past members: Bill Ferguson; Jim Ferguson; Rob Youngberg; Tony Zajkowski

Lotion is an American, Manhattan-based indie rock band, formed in 1991 by brothers Bill and Jim Ferguson (bass guitar and guitar respectively), drummer Rob Youngberg, and vocalist/guitarist Tony Zajkowski.

== Career ==
Lotion formed in New York City's East Village and released two seven-inch singles "Head" and "Tear" on Kokopop before releasing their debut album, full Isaac, through spinArt Records in 1994.

To promote the release of full Isaac, Lotion toured America and Europe with Pavement, Throwing Muses, and Mercury Rev. In 1995, the band released a self-titled EP on Big Cat Records, with a second EP, The Agnew Funeral E.P., recorded the next year. In 1996, Lotion released their second album, Nobody's Cool, with liner notes by Thomas Pynchon. At the time, after "the press registered a fair amount of amazement" at this development, the New York magazine quoted Rob Youngberg as having said "We wanted him to do [the liner notes], so we kept hinting... Then he offered", and reported that "the story, told in The New Yorker and other places, is that Pynchon followed the band to a gig in Cincinnati, where he revealed himself backstage. And they all became friends." The same article however continued: "Some people wonder whether any of it is true, or just Pynchon pulling everybody's leg again, with the boys in the band in cahoots. 'As I understand it, the real story is that the father of one of the band members is Thomas Pynchon's personal banker', says a music reporter. 'But I can't prove it.'" In 2009, The New Yorker- giving details of the original story including that Pynchon "had approached [the band] after a concert at a Cincinnati laundromat-cum-rock club; that he didn’t reveal his identity until months later, when he spotted a copy of his short-story collection lying around backstage"- stated this "hoax" story to be "mostly untrue", with the band at that time stating that "they had fed reporters at various outlets an account designed to be 'as Pynchonesque as possible'" and that Rob Youngberg's mother was Pynchon's accountant; having given him an advance copy of the band's album, "he liked it well enough; at any rate, he agreed to write the liner notes".

The Telephone Album followed in 1998. During the promotion for this album, the band made an appearance during an episode (Phases) of Buffy the Vampire Slayer and toured the US with Frank Black and the Catholics.

In 2001, Lotion went unofficially "on hiatus" while they pursued their own interests. Tony Zajkowski has gone on to play bass and sing for Schizo Fun Addict and has joined with former Lotion bandmate Rob Youngberg to form Honeycomb. Zajkowski and Youngberg later recorded under the name Baby Spiders and have two EPs on Bandcamp available for download. The band next performed in 2011 at Royal Flush Festival, and 2012 at Mercury Lounge. In 2023, the band reunited to play DROM 30, the 30th anniversary of Dromedary Records, with additional shows at Mercury Lounge and Drag Music.

== Discography ==
=== Albums ===
- 1994 full Isaac
- 1996 Nobody's Cool
- 1998 The Telephone Album

=== EPs ===
- 1994 The Around E.P.
- 1995 The Agnew Funeral E.P.

=== Singles ===
- 1992 "Head"
- 1993 "Tear"
- 1995 "Blind for Now"

=== Various artists compilations ===
- 1993 Chairman of the Board: Interpretations of Songs Made Famous by Frank Sinatra ("Fly Me to the Moon")
- 1997 Blatant Doom Trip ("Quality of Armor")
