= Wisconsin cheese =

Cheese made in the U.S. state of Wisconsin

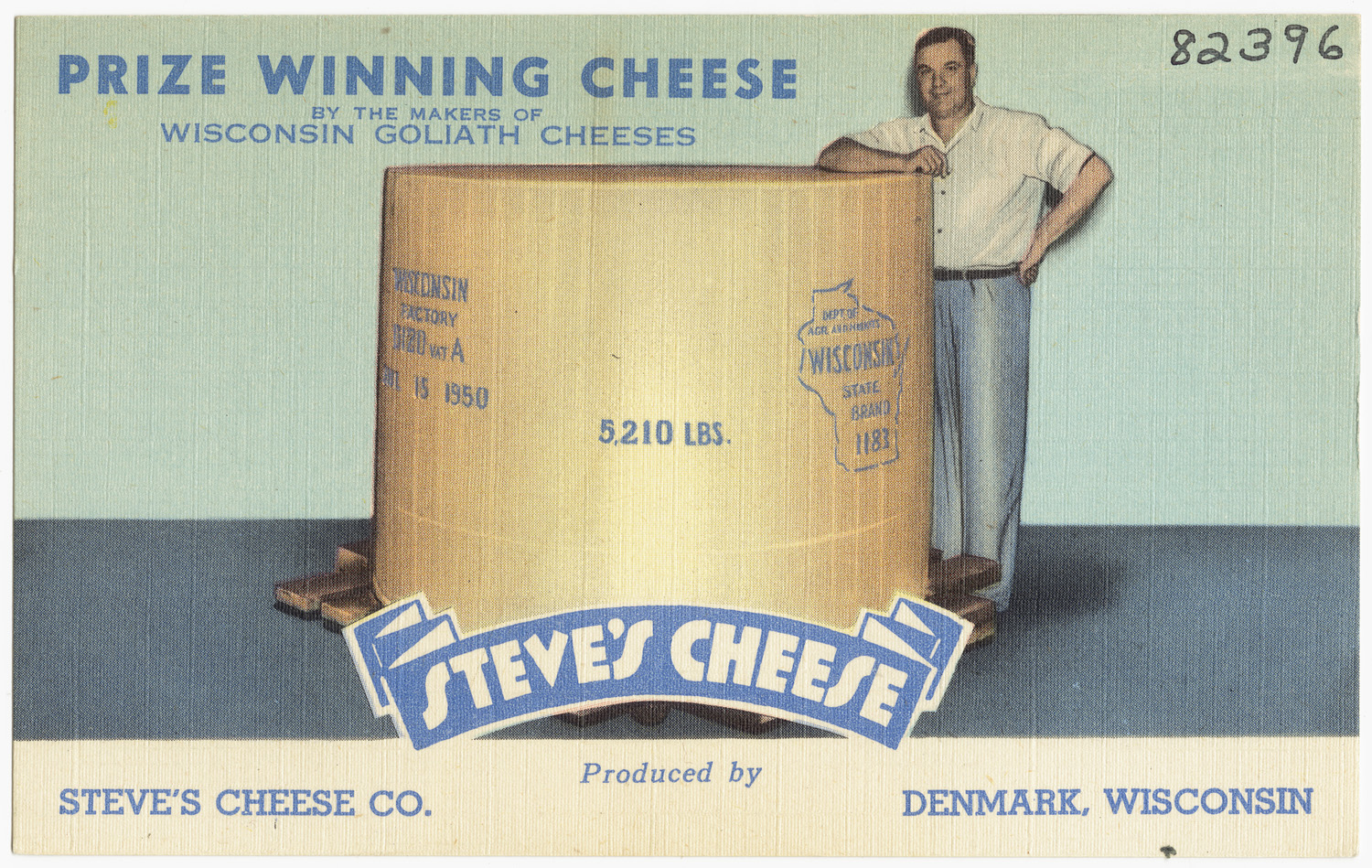
A 5,210 lb (2,360 kg) piece of prize-winning Wisconsin cheese, produced in the village of Denmark in 1950

Wisconsin cheese is cheese made in the U.S. state of Wisconsin. Wisconsin has a long tradition and history of cheese production and it is widely associated in popular culture with cheese and the dairy industry. As of 2024, Wisconsin was the largest cheese-producing state in the U.S., responsible for 25.2% of the country's total cheese production.

== History ==
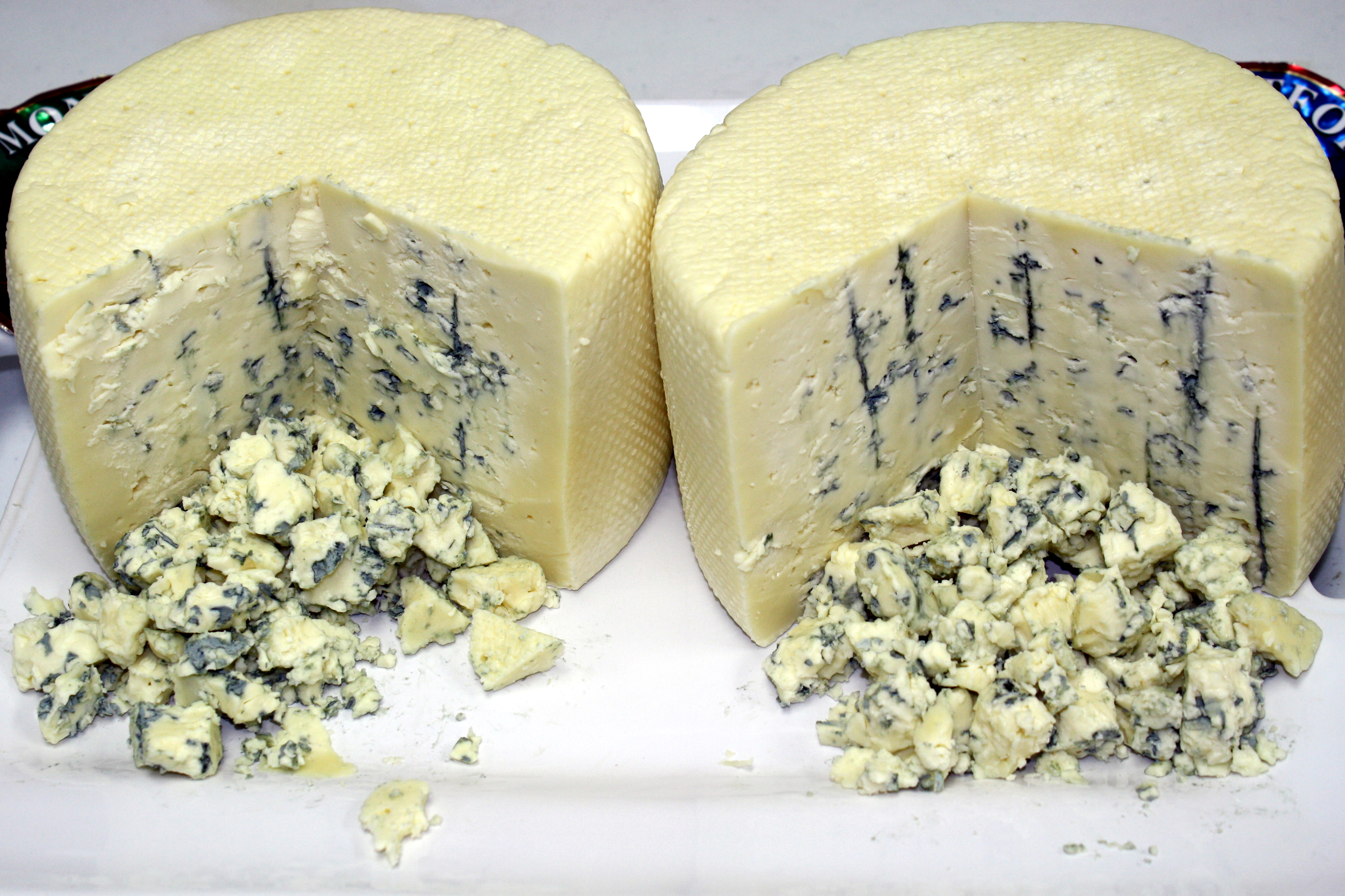
Award-winning Montforte blue cheese made in Montfort, USDA 2013

Wisconsin's cheesemaking tradition dates back to the 19th century. European immigrants who settled in Wisconsin were drawn to its fertile fields.

Wisconsin leads the nation in number of dairy plants.

Soon, dairy farms sprang up around Wisconsin, and farmers began producing cheese to preserve excess milk. In 1841, Anne Pickett established Wisconsin's first commercial cheese factory, using milk from neighbors' cows. A century later, Wisconsin was home to more than 1,500 cheese factories, which produced more than 500 million pounds of cheese per year.

Wisconsin has long been identified with cheese; in the words of a 2006 New York Times article, "Cheese is the state’s history, its pride, its self-deprecating, sometimes goofy, cheesehead approach to life." Wisconsin has claimed the title of the largest cheese-producing state in the United States since 1910. In 2006, Wisconsin produced 2.4 billion pounds of cheese and held onto its top ranking, despite concerns that California's faster-growing cheese industry would soon surpass Wisconsin's production. In 2007, Wisconsin again held onto its lead, which had begun to grow slightly. In 2010, Wisconsin's cheese production rose to 2.6 billion pounds (requiring the state cheese industry to import a substantial amount of milk from other states to meet production needs). In 2014, Wisconsin produced 2.9 billion pounds of cheese, accounting for 25.4% of all cheese produced in the U.S.

As of 2013, Wisconsin continues to be the largest cheese producer in the United States, making over 600 different cheese varieties. Wisconsin is the only U.S. state that requires that a licensed cheesemaker supervise the making of commercial cheese. It is also the only state to offer a master cheesemaker program, which is patterned on the rigorous standards of similar programs in Europe.

Some cheese makers even make cheeses shaped like the map of Wisconsin, to represent the strong cultural heritage of Wisconsin cheese.

== See also ==
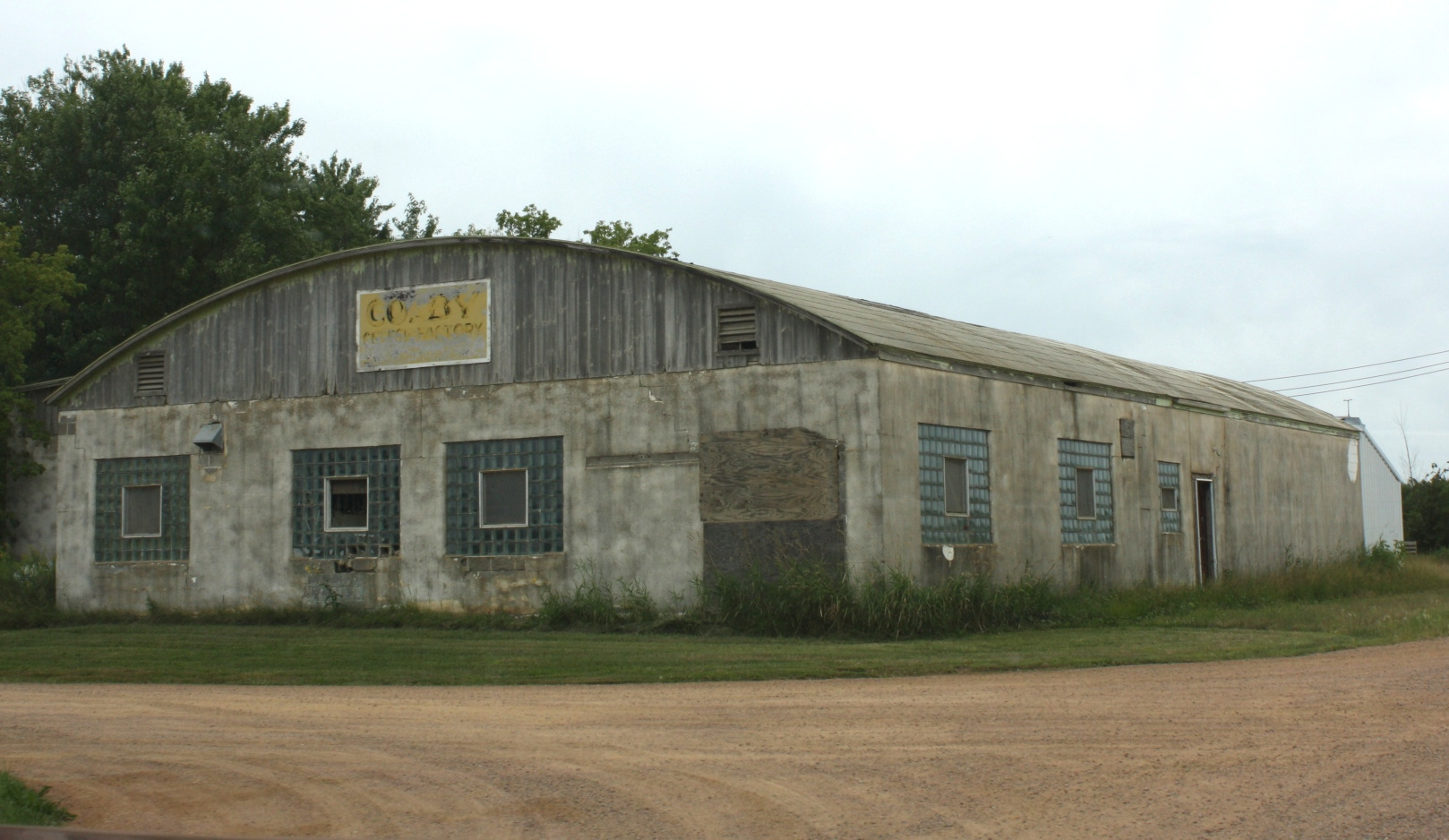
The original Colby cheese factory in Colby

- Cheese curd
- Colby cheese
- Cold pack cheese
- Cheesehead
- Cuisine of Wisconsin
