= Nobody's Cool =

Studio album by Lotion
- Released: March 1996
- Recorded: Big House, New York City, New York, United States
- Genre: Alternative rock
- Length: 47:34
- Language: English
- Label: spinART
- Producer: Jim Rondinelli

Lotion chronology
full Isaac (1994)	Nobody's Cool (1996)	✆ (1998)

Singles from Nobody's Cool
- 1. "Blind for Now" Released: 1995

Professional ratings
Review scores
Source	Rating
Allmusic	4.5/5 stars

Nobody's Cool is the second studio album by Lotion, released in March 1996.

Thomas Pynchon writing the album's liner notes drew attention; at the time, after "the press registered a fair amount of amazement" at this development, the New York magazine quoted Rob Youngberg as having said "We wanted him to do [the liner notes], so we kept hinting... Then he offered", and reported that "the story, told in The New Yorker and other places, is that Pynchon followed the band to a gig in Cincinnati, where he revealed himself backstage. And they all became friends." The same article however continued: "Some people wonder whether any of it is true, or just Pynchon pulling everybody's leg again, with the boys in the band in cahoots. 'As I understand it, the real story is that the father of one of the band members is Thomas Pynchon's personal banker', says a music reporter. 'But I can't prove it.'" In 2009, The New Yorker- giving details of the original story including that Pynchon "had approached [the band] after a concert at a Cincinnati laundromat-cum-rock club; that he didn’t reveal his identity until months later, when he spotted a copy of his short-story collection lying around backstage"- stated this "hoax" story to be "mostly untrue", with the band at that time stating that "they had fed reporters at various outlets an account designed to be 'as Pynchonesque as possible'" and that Rob Youngberg's mother was Pynchon's accountant; having given him an advance copy of the band's album, "he liked it well enough; at any rate, he agreed to write the liner notes".

== Track listing ==
All songs composed by Lotion

1. "Dear Sir" – 2:37
2. "The New Timmy" – 2:19
3. "The Sad Part" – 3:21
4. "Rock Chick" – 3:44
5. "Blind for Now" – 3:11
6. "The Enormous Room" – 3:42
7. "Sandra" – 3:43
8. "Juggernaut" – 2:58
9. "Namedropper" – 5:32
10. "Dalmacia 007" – 3:41
11. "Precious Tiny" – 9:57
12. "Switch" – 2:49

== Personnel ==
Lotion

- Bill Ferguson – bass guitar
- Jim Ferguson – guitar
- Rob Youngberg – drums
- Tony Zajkowski – vocals

Additional personnel

- Thomas Pynchon – liner notes
- Jim Rondinelli - Producer, Mixer
