= Adam Lasus =

American record producer, recording engineer and musician

Background information
- Born: September 2, 1968 (age 58)
- Origin: Mount Kisco, New York, United States
- Genres: Indie rock, rock
- Occupations: Record Producer, Recording Engineer
- Instruments: Bass guitar, mixing console, echoplex, tape recorder

Adam Lasus (born September 2, 1968 in Mount Kisco, New York, United States) is an American record producer, recording engineer and musician.

== Career ==
Lasus's credits include albums by Yo La Tengo, Clap Your Hands Say Yeah, Lilys, Helium, Juliana Hatfield, Mark Mulcahy, Dean Ween, Matt Keating, Clem Snide, Amy Ray, Madder Rose, Army Navy, Michael Cerveris, Anders Parker, Chris Harford, Versus, Dumptruck and Gigolo Aunts.

Lasus started Studio Red in Philadelphia, Pennsylvania, in 1990, and recorded many indie rock artists there: Helium, Versus, The Lilys, Madder Rose, Space Needle, Varnaline, Joey Sweeney, Matt Keating and many more.

In 1997, he moved to Brooklyn and started Fireproof Recording, a recording studio, which became an important part of the indie music scene in Brooklyn and New York City. While there Lasus worked with PJ Harvey, J Mascis, Joan Jett, Clap Your Hands Say Yeah, Mark Mulcahy, Spike Priggen, Violet, Daniel Johnston, As well as Members of Sleater Kinney, Cheap Trick, R.E.M., Guided By Voices, The Breeders, The Posies, Sonic Youth, The Beastie Boys, The Go-Betweens and Ween.

Lasus has always recorded to analog tape and believes that recording and mixing to tape produces the best possible sonic result. Typically his records are started by recording the band live to a 24-track 2-inch tape machine and he uses a large selection of unique vintage compressors, microphones, mic preamps, eq's, reverbs, tape delays and effects.

Fireproof Recording moved to Los Angeles in 2005 where Lasus worked with indie artists Anders Parker, Army Navy, The Submarines, Seneca Hawk, Marching Band, Happyness, The Shivers, Kelli Scarr, Emperor X and Matt Keating.

In 2008, Lasus worked as the music director and music producer for the film Bandslam directed by Todd Graff and starring Vanessa Hudgens, Alyson Michalka, Lisa Kudrow and David Bowie, in theaters August 2009.

Lasus produced and engineered the second Army Navy album The Last Place released June 14, 2011. The Last Place went to # 28 on the CMJ top 200 chart and Rolling Stone has called them an "artist to watch."

In August 2014, Lasus was the music producer for the film If I Stay, starring Chloë Grace Moretz and Jamie Blackley. Lasus produced six original songs and a cover of the song "Today" by Smashing Pumpkins, that were performed by the fictional band, Willamette Stone, in the film led by Jamie Blackley's character, Adam Wilde. The songs were all released on the If I Stay Original Motion Picture Soundtrack on Warner Brothers/ Water Tower Records.

In 2019, Lasus re-opened Studio Red in North Hollywood, 23 years after closing the original Studio Red in Philadelphia in 1996. Lasus wanted to get back to the fun and vibey recording environment that helped establish him in the 1990s. Since opening the new Studio Red Lasus worked with long time collaborator Chris Harford, as well as Kay Hanley, Son Of Stan, Sam Slick, Wake Up, Azalia Snail, Dan West, Joe Lima and Jason Lerman. The Los Angeles-based bands, Swerve, Easy Dreams, The Lightjackets, The Pretty Flowers, Much Better, Snowball ii, Mihi Nihil, IEVA and Army Navy, have all recorded at the new Studio Red.

In 2025 Lasus Co-wrote, recorded and produced songs with Louie Schultz for the Disney movie "Freakier Friday".

== Selected discography ==
Lasus is credited with the following works:

Year	Artist	Album	Label	Credits
1992	Juliana Hatfield	Hey Babe	Mammoth	Engineer
1992	Chris Harford	Be Headed	Elektra	Producer/Engineer
1992	Yo La Tengo	Upside Down	Alias	Producer/Engineer/Mixer
1993	Gigolo Aunts	Full On Bloom	Alias	Co-Producer
1993	Madder Rose	Bring It Down	Seed/Atlantic	Co-Producer/Engineer
1993	Matt Keating	Tell It To Yourself	Alias	Producer/Engineer
1993	Versus	Let's Electrify!	Remora	Producer/Engineer
1994	Gigolo Aunts	Flippin' Out	RCA/Fire	Co-Producer
1994	Helium	Pirate Prude	Matador	Producer/Engineer
1994	Lilys	Brief History Of Amazing Letdowns	SpinArt	Producer/Engineer/Mixer
1994	Matt Keating	Scaryarea	Alias	Producer/Engineer
1995	Helium	The Dirt of Luck	Matador	Producer/Engineer/Mixer
1995	Madder Rose	The Love You Save	Tag/Atlantic	Co-Producer/Engineer/Mixer
1995	Versus	The Stars Are Insane	Teen Beat	Producer/Engineer/Mixer
1995	Saturnine	Wreck at Pillar Point	dirt records	Producer/Engineer
1996	Yo La Tengo	Genius + Love = Yo La Tengo	Matador	Producer/Engineer/Mixer
1997	Matt Keating	Killjoy	Alias	Producer/Engineer
1997	Space Needle	The Moray Eels Eat The Space Needle	Zero Hour	Producer/Engineer
1999	Leah Coloff	Dark Sweet Heart	Searching Eye Records	Producer/Engineer/Mixer
1999	Number19	Suspension	Searching Eye Records	Producer/Engineer/Mixer
1999	Mark Mulcahy	Fathering	Mezzotint	Producer/Engineer
2000	Chris Harford	Wake	Soul Selects	Producer/Engineer/Mixer
2001	Spike Priggen	The Very Thing That You Treasure	The Volare Label (US)/ Laughing Outlaw (Aus/EU)	Producer/Engineer/Mixer
2001	Mark Mulcahy	SmileSunset	Mezzotint	Producer/Engineer/Mixer
2002	Clem Snide	You Were a Diamond	Spin Art	Producer/Engineer/Mixer
2003	Evil Jake	Be My Ex-Girlfriend	Evil Records	Producer/Engineer/Mixer
2003	Spike Priggen	Stars After Stars After Stars	The Volare Label	Engineer/Mixer
2004	The Fontaine Toups	TFT	TeenBeat Records	Producer/Engineer
2005	Clap Your Hands Say Yeah	Clap Your Hands Say Yeah	Wichita Recordings	Producer/Engineer/Mixer
2006	Anders Parker	Anders Parker	Baryon	Producer/Engineer/Mixer
2006	Spike Priggen	There's No Sound In Flutes	The Volare Label	Mixer
2006	Back to Blonde	Swim West	Silence Breaks	Producer/Engineer
2007	Oliver Future	Pax Futura	Fireproof Recordings	Producer/Engineer/Mixer
2008	Army Navy	Army Navy	Fever Zone	Producer/Engineer/Mixer
2008	Marching Band	Spark Large	U&L Records	Producer/Engineer/Mixer
2009	Settle	At Home We Are Tourists	Epitaph	Producer/Engineer
2010	The Orbans	When We Were Wild	Sheffield Avenue	Producer/Engineer/Mixer
2011	Emperor X	Western Teleport	Bar None	Mixer
2011	Ben Harper	"Clearly Severely" from Give Til It's Gone	Virgin	Mixer
2011	Army Navy	The Last Place	Fever Zone	Producer/Engineer/Mixer
2013	Army Navy	The Crushed EP	Fever Zone	Producer/Engineer/Mixer
2013	Son of Stan	Divorce Pop	Wizardvizion	Producer/Engineer/Mixer
2014	Soundtrack	If I Stay Original Motion Picture Soundtrack	Warner Brothers	Producer/Engineer/Mixer
2014	Happyness	Weird Little Birthday	Bar/None Records	Mixer/Engineer
2014	Army Navy	The Wilderness Inside	Fever Zone	Producer/Engineer/Mixer
2017	Happyness	Write In	Bar/None Records	Mixer/Engineer
2017	Chris Harford	Horn Of Plenty	Soul Selects	Producer/Engineer/Mixer
2018	Dean Ween	Rock2	Schnitzel Records	Engineer
2019	Nightjacket	Beauty In The Dark	Nightjacket Records	Producer/Engineer
2019	Son Of Stan	Diamond Cuts	Wizardvision	Engineer
2021	Mihi Nihil	Mihi Nihil	Flora Toro Records	Producer/Engineer
2021	Swerve	Ruin Your Day	Swerve Records	Producer/Engineer
2026	Emperor X	Unified Field	Bar/None Records	Producer/Engineer/Mixer
2026	The Pretty Flowers	Never Felt Bitter	Forge Again Records	Engineer
