= Fireproof Recording =

Coordinates: 40.707384°N 73.929104°W

Fireproof Recording is a recording studio, which became an important part of the indie music scene in New York City. In 1997, Adam Lasus moved to Brooklyn, New York and started the company.

Fireproof clients include indie artists Clap Your Hands Say Yeah, PJ Harvey, Clem Snide, Daniel Johnston, Mark Mulcahy, Amy Ray and many others.

Fireproof is an analog and digital recording studio relying on vintage 24 track 2 inch multitrack tape machines and 1/2 inch mixdown decks.

Fireproof uses vintage gear manufactured by Neve, Studer, Ampex, Neumann, Vox, Hammond, UREI, ADR, Manley, Focusrite, AKG, Oktava, Neotek and API.

Fireproof has a vast collection of vintage guitars, amps and outboard audio compressors.

Fireproof Recording is currently located in Los Angeles, California, where Lasus has worked with indie artists Marching Band, Anders Parker, Oliver Future, Army Navy, Matt Keating, Kelli Scarr, The Shivers, Noah And The MegaFauna, Emperor X, The Orbans and Son Of Stan.

== Records recorded ==
- Clap Your Hands Say Yeah (Producer/Engineer/Mixer) Clap Your Hands Say Yeah (Wichita Recordings)
- Yo La Tengo (Producer/Engineer) Genius + Love =YLT (Matador), Upside Down (Alias)
- Clem Snide (Producer/Engineer) You Were A Diamond (Spin Art)
- Helium (Producer/Engineer) The Dirt of Luck (Matador), Pirate Prude (Matador)
- Juliana Hatfield (Engineer) Hey Babe (Mammoth)
- Versus (Producer/Engineer) The Stars Are Insane (Teen Beat), Let's Electrify (Remora)
- Matt Keating (Producer/Engineer) Killjoy (Alias), Scary Area (Alias), Tell It To Yourself (Alias)
- Oliver Future (Producer/Engineer/Mixer) Pax Futura (Fireproof Recordings)
- Madder Rose (Co-Producer/Engineer) Bring It Down (Seed/Atlantic), The Love You Save (Tag/Atlantic)
- Lilys (Producer/Engineer) Brief History Of Amazing Letdowns (SpinArt)
- Mark Mulcahy (Producer/Engineer) Fathering (Mezzotint), Smile Sunset (Mezzotint)
- Gigolo Aunts (co-producer) Flipping Out (RCA/Fire), Full On Bloom (Alias)
- Anders Parker (Producer/Engineer) Anders Parker (Baryon)
- Back to Blonde (Producer/Engineer) Swim West (Silence Breaks)
- Space Needle (Producer/Engineer) The Moray Eels Eat The Space Needle (Zero Hour)
- Chris Harford (Producer/Engineer) Wake (Soul Selects), Be Headed (Elektra), 'Comet' (Black Shepherd)
