= Rocket Science (film) =

2007 American comedy-drama film

- Theatrical release poster
- Directed by: Jeffrey Blitz
- Written by: Jeffrey Blitz
- Produced by: Effie T. Brown; Sean Welch
- Starring: Reece Thompson; Anna Kendrick; Nicholas D'Agosto; Vincent Piazza; Aaron Yoo
- Narrated by: Dan Cashman
- Cinematography: Jo Willems
- Edited by: Yana Gorskaya
- Music by: Eef Barzelay
- Production companies: Duly Noted, Inc. B&W Films
- Distributed by: HBO Films; Picturehouse
- Release dates: January 17, 2007 (Sundance); August 10, 2007 (United States)
- Running time: 101 minutes
- Country: United States
- Language: English
- Budget: $4.5 million
- Box office: $755,774

Rocket Science is a 2007 American comedy-drama film written and directed by Jeffrey Blitz, and starring Reece Thompson, Anna Kendrick, Nicholas D'Agosto, Vincent Piazza, and Aaron Yoo. It tells the story of Hal Hefner, a fifteen-year-old stutterer who decides to join his school's debate team when he develops a crush on its star member, and addresses the themes of coming of age, sexuality, and finding one's voice.

Blitz conceived a rough storyline for the film while making Spellbound, a documentary about 1999's Scripps National Spelling Bee, but an HBO Films executive persuaded him to write the film based on his own adolescence when he told her about his experiences as a stutterer. The film's producers visited several cities in the United States and Canada; Thompson was cast based on a tape which his agent had sent and a follow-up audition after the first actor cast in the lead was forced to pull out. The film was shot over 30 days in Baltimore, Maryland and Trenton, New Jersey.

Rocket Science premiered on January 19, 2007 at the 2007 Sundance Film Festival and was theatrically released on August 10. It was not a financial success, earning only US$756,000 from its $4.5 million budget, though it was well-received by critics. Reviewers praised Thompson, Kendrick and D'Agosto's performances and the film's parallels to real life; others believed that the film was deliberately quirky and forgettable. It was nominated for Sundance's Dramatic Grand Jury Prize and three Independent Spirit Awards. Though it failed to win any of the Grand Jury Prizes at Sundance, Blitz won its Dramatic Directing Award.

== Plot ==
Hal Hefner is a fifteen-year-old student of Plainsboro, New Jersey with a pronounced stutter. His older brother Earl is an obsessive-compulsive kleptomaniac, his father Doyle has recently walked out on the family after a heated argument, and his mother Juliet has begun to date the father of his school friend, Heston.

Hal is riding the school bus home one day when he is approached by Ginny Ryerson, the articulate, competitive star of the debate team. She urges him to join her and replace her former partner, Ben Wekselbaum, who has dropped out of high school after falling silent mid-speech and losing the New Jersey State High School Policy Debate Championship. Though Hal initially declines, he finds himself besotted with Ginny and agrees to be her partner. Hal and Ginny begin to study for the upcoming tournament and form arguments on either side of whether the federal government should support the teaching of sexual abstinence in public schools. When Hal finds himself unable to talk during a practice debate, he runs out of the room and hides in the janitorial closet, where Ginny joins him. Hal kisses her hopefully, and they make out, but she subsequently falls out of contact with him. Ginny's parents assure him that she is confident with the work they have already completed and that she will meet him on the day of the debate.

On the day of the tournament, Coach Lumbly tells the debate team that Ginny has transferred to Townsend Prep for the remainder of her senior year and that Hal will be paired with Heston for the day. Struggling with his speech and his stutter, Hal calls his therapist, who suggests that he sing his speech or talk with a foreign accent. Hal and Heston finish the day without much success, while Ginny wins a trophy for First Place as an Individual Speaker, which inexplicably goes missing. Coach Lumbly asks Hal to leave the team, telling him that Ginny had never planned to debate as his partner and had only recruited him as a cruel joke to damage the school's chances of winning. He breaks into Earl's bedroom and takes a bottle of stolen tequila, then rides with Heston to his friend Lewis's house, who lives across the street from Ginny. A drunken Hal drags Lewis's mother's cello across the street and throws it through Ginny's window just as she is arriving home with her new teammate, Ram.

Later in the year, Hal's mother breaks up with Heston's father, and Hal decides to seek out Ginny and return her trophy, which he stole. She rejects his apology, and he travels to Trenton—the "Big City"—to find Ben, Ginny's former debate partner. Hal convinces Ben to debate with him, and they register as a home-schooled team in the upcoming Policy Debate Championships. In order to overcome his stutter, Ben helps Hal to write his entire speech to the tune of "The Battle Hymn of the Republic". During the tournament, Hal is interrupted in the middle of his song-speech by Coach Lumbly and a Debate Official who disqualify Hal and Ben on the grounds that neither of them is home-schooled. Ben is satisfied with their efforts, but Hal finds Ginny before leaving. He insists that one day will be his day, while she tells him that it was not easy for her to betray him as he walks off, having gained a sense of confidence. He spends the evening at a nearby beach, and when his father picks him up, Hal tries to tell him that life and love "shouldn't be rocket science", although he is unable to say the phrase "rocket science" due to his stutter.

== Cast ==
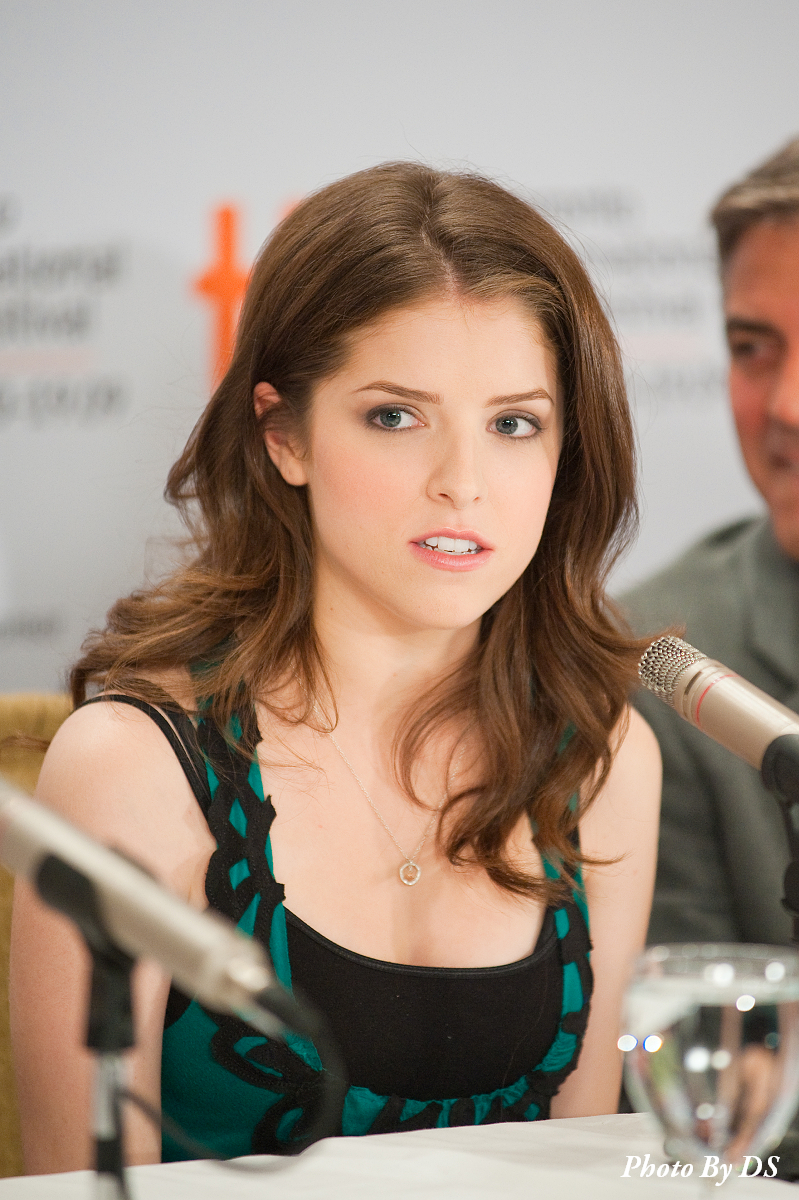
Anna Kendrick learned debate strategies and studied with a college debate coach to prepare for the role

- Reece Thompson as Hal Hefner, a shy fifteen-year-old student at Plainsboro High School, New Jersey with a pronounced stutter. Beginning in late 2004, Rocket Science's producers traveled to several American and Canadian cities looking for an actor to play the lead role of Hal. At one point, Carter Jenkins was set to play Hal, but NBC blocked this as he was contracted for further episodes of Surface. HBO Films told the producers after six months of searching for a Hal that it would abandon the project if a lead actor was not found in two weeks, at which point a desperate Jeffrey Blitz watched all of the unsolicited audition tapes that he had been sent and "knew immediately we had a promising candidate" when he saw Thompson's tape. Although a casting call was originally posted for a teenage boy aged 13–18 who had a stutter and could also act, Thompson had previously been taught how to stutter. However Blitz wanted Hal to stutter in a different style, knowing he was going to block up on a particular word and looking for ways to work round it. Before filming, Thompson was taught this specific style by a speech pathologist.
- Anna Kendrick as Ginny Ryerson, the ambitious and competitive star of the Plainsboro High School debate team. Anna Kendrick was one of the first cast members to sign on to the film. Blitz recalls writing "Anna Kendrick is Ginny Ryerson" after her audition and, after auditioning many other girls, she was cast. To prepare for her role, Kendrick learned the typical debating strategy of "spreading", a rapid-fire delivery used in order to present as much evidence and information as possible within a time limit. Kendrick and Nicholas D'Agosto studied with a college debate coach and also viewed a live high school debate. Ginny's comment "I upped your game, little man" was inserted into the script by Blitz from a journal which he asked Kendrick to write in character.
- Nicholas D'Agosto as Ben Wekselbaum, Ginny's former debate partner who dropped out of high school to work at a dry cleaners after falling silent midspeech and losing the championship trophy. "Nick takes his work very seriously—it's an approach that's very much like Ben, in my mind," said Blitz of D'Agosto, calling his performance "just right". D'Agosto joked about his being cast as a high school student, having been cast as a student previously in Election, which was released eight years before Rocket Science, in 1999. Like Kendrick, D'Agosto had to learn a number of debating techniques to prepare for his role.
- Vincent Piazza as Earl Hefner, Hal's obsessive-compulsive, kleptomaniacal older brother. Vincent Piazza was studying at the New York acting school where Rocket Science casting sessions were being held; he decided to audition and was one of the first actors to be cast. When he first auditioned, he spoke with a lisp, said Blitz: "I eventually decided to do away with the lisp—one major speech impediment per family is plenty—but kept many of the rest of the choices Vince brought to Earl." Blitz cited Piazza's portrayal of Earl as an example of "the strong choices that actors make in interpreting their character".
- Aaron Yoo as Heston, Hal and Earl's bi-curious school friend who ends up joining Hal in the debate team. "Aaron made Heston almost an alien among the kids of New Jersey. He's never quite connected to the scene but he's always aware of it," said Blitz about Yoo's performance as Heston. He says Yoo was cast because of the "dramatic decisions" he brought to Heston's portrayal "from the start".
- Margo Martindale as Debate Coach Lumbly at the high school.
- Michael J. Kusnir as A Student in the debate program with Hal. He’s always quick to taunt Hal throughout his debates.
- Josh Kay as Lewis Garrles, an eleven-year-old boy whom Hal befriends while loitering in the street outside Ginny's house. Blitz was pleased with Kay's original audition: "When Josh Kay came in to audition in New York, it was instantly obvious that he was perfect: smart, deadpan and with a natural ability to either nail the timing of the lines himself or mimic my reading to him."
- Denis O'Hare as Doyle Hefner, Hal's father who walks out on the family abruptly, following an argument with his wife about suitcases. Denis O'Hare originally auditioned in 2005 for an alternate role, and, describing O'Hare as a "must-have", Blitz had him re-audition at a different session in the role of Doyle. Because of scheduling conflicts, O'Hare was only available for filming on two days of production: the first day and the last, filming one of the first scenes of the film and also the final scene.
- Maury Ginsberg as Mr. Lewinsky, Hal's vain speech therapist who offers no successful advice. The character was based on Blitz's own experiences as a youth with many well-meaning but mostly ineffective therapists when he sought treatments to his stutter.
- Jonah Hill as The Junior Philosopher, a teenager Hal meets in the library while studying for the policy debate with Ginny. Hill had initially auditioned for another role in the film, but was unavailable as he was shooting another film at the same time. Blitz was keen to have him appear, though, and so wrote him a small role as the Junior Philosopher, appearing in only two scenes.
- Dan Cashman voices the narrator. Blitz chose to use a third-person narrative narrator to juxtapose Hal, a character with no voice, with a character who is "nothing but a disembodied voice, a purely articulate voice", showing "the gulf between who Hal is and who he wishes to be".

Blitz and the film's producers considered having celebrity cameos in Hal's parents' roles, though he decided that cameos would draw away from the film as the celebrities would not be "onscreen long enough for them to become someone other than the celebrity". In between shooting the film and its release, Hill became a well-known celebrity with the films Knocked Up and Superbad; Blitz describes being "bummed about that" because of his reluctance to feature celebrities.

== Themes ==
Film critic Justin Chang, writing for Variety, summarized the film as "eloquent about love, self-realization and adolescent angst". The main theme addressed in Rocket Science is Hal's coming of age, which is portrayed both by his understanding of love and finding his voice. The film takes its title from Hal's closing quote that understanding life and love "shouldn't be rocket science".

Blitz described Hal as "lost in the mystery of love" and he "loved the idea that a kid who is lost when he's confronted by love and sex would be saddled with the name Hal Hefner", an homage to Playboy founder Hugh Hefner. Throughout the film, Hal is seen to be surrounded by sex and relationships—titlecards for the seasons of the year are placed over images of kissing students; Hal listens to his mother having intercourse with her new boyfriend; his friend Lewis shows Hal images from the Kama Sutra; while Lewis's parents attempt to mend their relationship through music therapy—but the adults in the film were written to be similarly confused and frustrated with love. "In a world where all the children are trying so hard to be like adults", according to Stylus' Yannick LeJacq, "the adults are all sullenly try[ing] to reenact their childhood, taking every chance to ignore their children and savor the meaningless void of leisure time."

Blitz believed that Hal's stuttering was a metaphor for his lack of mastery of life and love: "He can't control this thing that ought to be so simple ... And so much of his life is like that." Journalist Mark Baumer highlighted the juxtaposition of Hal with the fast-talking debaters, who are at opposite ends of the spectrum with their speech but are both struggling with communication and expression. Blitz said that "Even when [the children] can speak incredibly fast and are packing their sentences with tons of SAT words, they still don't know exactly what they're talking about. There is still a question about whether their content of what they're talking about matches up with what they're feeling or trying to express. Whether it's the kid who's talking a million miles an hour, but saying nothing or the kid who isn't able to get out any word at all they're both at the mercy of not knowing how to express what's inside them."

== Production ==
=== Conception ===
"I see the arc that takes me from Spellbound to Rocket Science but I think you could see Rocket Science and not feel like there was any connection with Spellbound. In some ways, it's the anti-Spellbound. Because Spellbound has a kind of dramatic arc that it stays faithful to, whereas Rocket Science really goes out of its way to sloth off that arc."
—Jeffrey Blitz, writer/director

After the success of his 2002 documentary Spellbound, Jeffrey Blitz was encouraged by his agents to write fiction because of the larger revenue brought in by fiction films. Blitz began to piece together a story that had come to him while he had been filming Spellbound: "I kept thinking, what if we met a kid that was just an amazing lover of words? What if we met a kid that was lured into the spelling bee because he was in love with a girl?" He had compiled a mental list of characters who he expected to encounter while making Spellbound, several of whom eventually became Rocket Science characters. Despite claiming to be "allergic" to autobiographical films, he was persuaded by HBO executive Maud Nadler to write a screenplay based on his own adolescence when he told her that, as a teenager, he joined his school's debate team to try and overcome his stutter. He says that he is uninterested in teen films, so "the only way I was going to do a teen movie is if I felt like I could try to be more honest about what the actual experience of being a teenager is like." He was aware of the clichés in teen films, so "tried to undo them without wrecking them". Blitz wrote the script "off and on" over a year in between stints of commercial directing. He cites directors Hal Ashby and Billy Wilder as his greatest influences with their absurdist comedies, though critics have suggested influence from Gary Larson, Alexander Payne, Mike Nichols and Wes Anderson—the latter despite Blitz specifically saying, "I did not want a Wes Andersen [sic] snowglobe artificial world."

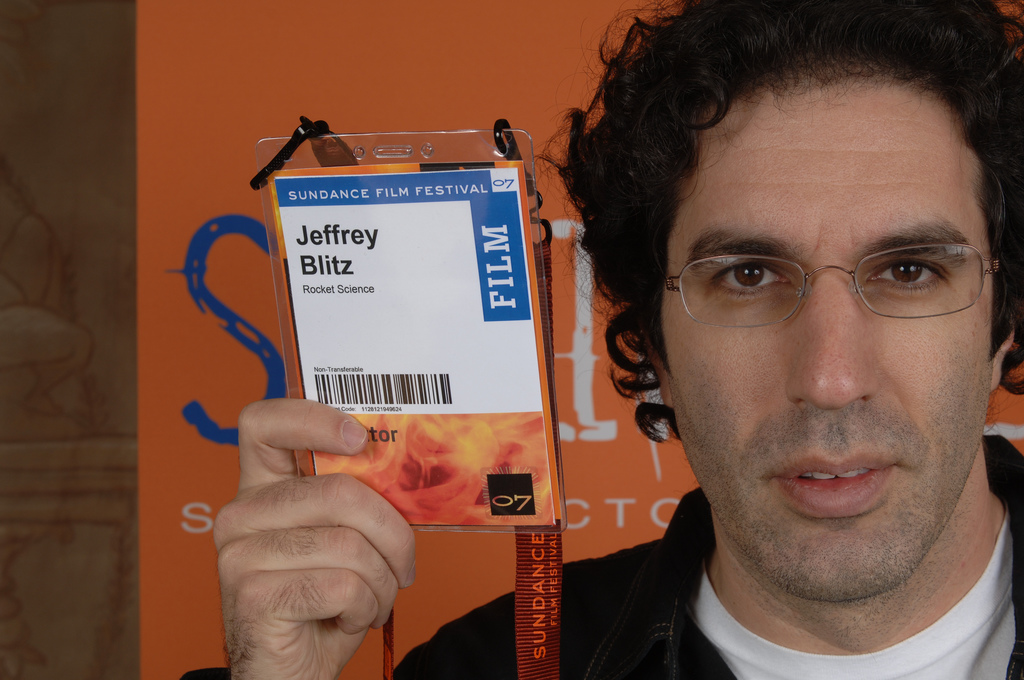
Jeffrey Blitz drew from many of his own experiences as a stutterer when writing the script.

While many parts of Rocket Science are completely fictitious, a number of the story's details are lifted directly from Blitz's own experiences. In several scenes of the film, Hal is trying to ask for a slice of pizza but cannot say the word "pizza"; this is drawn from Blitz's experience of trying to order a hamburger from hotel room service without being able to say the word "hamburger". Hal's first debate scene is based on Blitz's first debate, where, for a full eight minutes, he could only make the sound "agh", and the scene in which Hal throws a cello through a window was inspired by Blitz's own destruction of a flute. While Blitz grew up in Ridgewood, New Jersey, he chose to set the narrative in Plainsboro, New Jersey—a place he has never visited—because it was closer to Trenton, rather than New York City. He found it humorous that the characters referred to Trenton as the "Big City" and that Plainsboro seemed to orbit around a dead city, Trenton, in comparison to New York.

=== Design ===
A drab color palette was used to give the film a deadpan undertone.

Blitz hired Belgian Jo Willems as the cinematographer, having collaborated previously on commercials. Blitz admired Willems' "European sensibility about shooting" and wanted to use his aesthetic to "tell a story that was equal parts deadpan and suggestive of the 'real' world". In creating a "look" for the film, he said that he relied upon "almost opposite impulses"—to tell the story intimately but also carry the comedy. Through the film, he used lighting and art direction that felt real, while framing the shots to come across as deadpan. Production designer Rick Butler chose bland, simple furniture and commonplace houses and cars to give the film a sense of timelessness and familiarity. The color palette in both production and costume design was drab and ordinary to give a deadpan undertone. Blitz was most inspired by the cinematography and production design of Hal Ashby's films: "I watched his films again and again ... He has a masterful blending of absurd comedy and naturalism."

=== Filming ===
The night before filming began, Blitz took Thompson, Piazza and Yoo to dinner, insisting that they stay in character. Thompson, as Hal, was unable to tell the waitress what he wanted to order; Piazza, as Earl, obsessive-compulsively asked the waitress for a fresh straw each time she passed; and Yoo, as Heston, could not decide what to order and had the waitress explain the menu repeatedly. The purpose of the evening, according to Blitz, was for the actors to "be comfortable around each other inhabiting their roles without self-consciousness", as each of their roles required them to act in potentially embarrassing ways.

Principal photography began in Baltimore, Maryland on the week beginning July 18, 2005, the project receiving a tax rebate as part of Baltimore's Employer Wage Rebate Program for filmmakers. The film was shot on a 30-day schedule with an overall budget of $4.5 million. Blitz chose to film in Maryland, as its child labour laws are much less restrictive than those of New Jersey, where the film is set. This was important because Reece Thompson, who was sixteen years old at the time, appears in almost every scene. While Baltimore stood in for Plainsboro, New Jersey, scenes set in Trenton, New Jersey were filmed on location, including shots of the Lower Trenton Bridge over the Delaware River. The final scenes of the film took place on a boardwalk at the Jersey Shore with the shoot concluding at 5 am. While filming, Blitz sometimes used hand gestures from the director's chair instead of yelling "cut" because of his stutter.

== Score and soundtrack ==
Rocket Science: Original Motion Picture Soundtrack

Soundtrack album by Various Artists
- Released: August 7, 2007
- Length: 44:49
- Label: Lakeshore Records
- Producer: Evyen J. Klean

Jeffrey Blitz wanted the film's music to be "sweet and a touch melancholy and just a step out of rhythm", demonstrating Hal's sense of himself in the world, and to express his teenage angst while "maintain[ing] an underlying sweetness". While writing the Rocket Science script, Blitz had been listening to indie rock band Clem Snide's music and suggested the use of their music on the soundtrack to the HBO executive producers. He contacted Clem Snide's lead singer Eef Barzelay to use some of the band's songs, but Barzelay says "it just made more sense for me to write original instrumental music", and composed the incidental score himself. When choosing instruments, he tried to create sounds that would match Hal's awkwardness. "I had this little ukulele that I never played ... And Jeffrey [Blitz] had gotten a little bee in his bonnet about the accordion ... and then at one point I started using a kazoo." One of his original songs, "I Love the Unknown", was chosen from the 1999 album Your Favorite Music.

Blitz also chose to use the Violent Femmes' songs "Blister in the Sun", "Kiss Off", and a cover version of "Add It Up". The Violent Femmes' songs were chosen for the film by Blitz before filming had begun as he believed that they expressed "the rage of love gone wrong better than any band out there", and they allowed their songs to be used in the film after reading the script. Blitz thought that the Violent Femmes suggested "both [Hal's] anger and the humor all around it".

Track listing
No.	Title	Performer(s)	Length
1.	"Opening"	Eef Barzelay	1:45
2.	"Fight Song Melodies"	Barzelay	3:31
3.	"Battle Hymn on Uke"	Barzelay	0:18
4.	"Hal Running"	Barzelay	1:32
5.	"The Blob"	Guy Klucevsek, David Garland	3:08
6.	"Promise of Love"	Barzelay	3:22
7.	"Blister in the Sun"	Sam Matthews, Houfei Yang	0:15
8.	"Blister in the Sun"	Violent Femmes	2:25
9.	"Do You Love Me?"	Barzelay	3:21
10.	"Down and Dirty"	Barzelay	0:35
11.	"Kiss Off"	Violent Femmes	2:51
12.	"After the Cello"	Barzelay	1:02
13.	"Bus to Hazlet"	Barzelay	1:18
14.	"Boy Ghost"	Barzelay	1:11
15.	"Welcome to Trenton"	Barzelay	0:49
16.	"I Love the Unknown"	Clem Snide	2:43
17.	"Walk and Talk"	Barzelay	2:13
18.	"Battle Hymn of the Republic"	Barzelay	4:15
19.	"Failed to Open" (Bonus track)	Barzelay	2:52
20.	"Demo Medley" (Bonus track)	Barzelay	2:18
21.	"Girls Don't Care" (Bonus track)	Barzelay	3:16

== Distribution ==
=== Rating ===
When reviewed by the Motion Picture Association of America, Rocket Science was rated R for strong sexual language, brief sex, brief nudity, some violence and a scene depicting teen drinking. Jeffrey Blitz described the decision as "mind-boggling" and "ludicrous"; he claimed that the images of Kama Sutra seen briefly in the film were "antique Indian paintings" and that the teenagers' discussion of blow jobs was harmless as they had clearly never engaged in fellatio themselves. He criticized the MPAA for its PG-13 rating of Live Free or Die Hard (also released in 2007), which involves "a girl getting groped at the beginning, all sorts of cursing, gigantic body count, just completely fucking crazy." Other questionable elements were altered during production, including a more graphical male beefcake calendar shown to Hal by Heston.

=== Theatrical release ===
The world premiere of Rocket Science was held on January 19, 2007 at the Sundance Film Festival. The film was subsequently screened at the European Film Market, U.S. Comedy Arts Festival, AFI Dallas International Film Festival, Philadelphia Film Festival, Atlanta Film Festival, Maryland Film Festival, San Francisco International Film Festival, Cannes Film Festival, Maui Film Festival, Provincetown International Film Festival, Nantucket Film Festival, and Edinburgh International Film Festival before its theatrical release on August 10, 2007.

Rocket Science had a limited theatrical release in the United States, initially playing only in selected theaters in New York City and Los Angeles. In its debut week beginning August 10, it was the week's second highest-grossing independent film after 2 Days in Paris, earning US$58,536 across six screens with a per-screen average of $9,756. The following week, the film expanded to 40 screens but fell to a per-screen average of $2,930. In its third week, it earned a per-screen average of $1,998 from 59 different theaters, placing 22nd on the list of highest-grossing independent films with a cumulative total of $389,261. Rocket Science ended its theatrical run with a total domestic gross of US$714,943 and a foreign gross of $40,831, a worldwide total of $755,774. It placed 258th for the highest-grossing films of 2007 and 104th for the year's R-rated films.

=== Home media ===
Rocket Science was released on DVD on January 29, 2008 in Region 1 and February 4, 2008 in Region 2. The single-disc volume includes two additional featurettes: "The Making of Rocket Science" and a music video for "I Love the Unknown" performed by Eef Barzelay, featuring various clips from the film.

== Reception ==
=== Critical reception ===
Rotten Tomatoes gives the film 84% from 111 critic reviews, with an average score of 6.93/10. The website's critics consensus reads, "Though Rocket Science appears to be a typically quirky indie, the well-rounded performances and director Jeffrey Blitz's clear affection for his characters gives the film its proper human spark." At Metacritic, which assigns a normalized rating out of 100 to reviews from mainstream critics, the film received an average score of 73 based on 28 reviews, indicating "generally favorable reviews".

Chicago Sun-Times critic Roger Ebert gave the film 3.5 out of 4 stars, praising Thompson and Kendrick's performances and the film's honesty and plausibility. He suspected that "a lot of high school students will recognize elements of real life in the movie." Bruce Feld of Film Journal International agreed, calling the film a "dead-on revelation of what high school is really like". Variety magazine's Justin Chang thought that Blitz displayed a "terrific ability to embrace people's idiosyncrasies, real or fictitious" and called the cast a "strong ensemble", commending Thompson, Kendrick and D'Agosto in particular. The San Francisco Chronicle's Peter Hartlaub thought that the script "never fails to present an unexpected scenario – usually accompanied by a moment or two of hilarity", but felt that Hal's ultimate failure was anticlimactic and "frustrating for moviegoers who prefer tidy endings". Stephen Holden, however, writing for The New York Times, believed that the final scenes were a "[sure] sign of the movie's integrity". TV Guide's Ken Fox similarly admired the more "real" ending, and wrote that the film was "sharp, observant ... [and] wonderfully dry". Desson Thomson of The Washington Post praised Blitz for straying from common stereotypes and "opt[ing] for deeper, darker and wittier developments".

Other reviews were less positive. Owen Gleiberman of Entertainment Weekly graded Rocket Science as a C, calling the film "one of those terminally annoying, depressive-yet-coy Sundance faves in which the tale of a mopey teen misfit unfolds behind a hard candy shell of irony". David Cornelius of DVD Talk criticized the film's phoniness and deliberate quirkiness. He was impressed by Thompson's portrayal of Hal, "bursting with authenticity", but wrote that the supporting characters "never have the chance to ring true" in a cast "overflowing with unnecessary hokey colorfulness". Online film critic for ReelViews James Berardinelli called the film "moderately uplifting but not especially memorable" and claimed that "the problem with Rocket Science is that the character at the center of the drama isn't very energetic or, truth be told, interesting." The Chicago Tribune's Michael Phillips, who gave the film 2.5 out of 4 stars, felt that it "doesn't quite work" and "the spark goes out of the writing" when Hal seeks out Ben in Trenton.

=== Accolades ===
Rocket Science was nominated for three Independent Spirit Awards, in the categories of "Best First Feature", "Best First Screenplay" (Jeffrey Blitz) and "Best Supporting Female" (Anna Kendrick), but failed to win any. At the Sundance Film Festival, Blitz won the Dramatic Directing Award and the film was nominated for the Dramatic Grand Jury Prize. The film's DVD trailer was also nominated at the Golden Trailer Awards for the "Best In-Theater Advertising" and "Best Music".
