= Last place =

Last place or Last Place may refer to:

- In sports, a team at the bottom of the standings, see Sports league ranking
- Last Place (album), a 2017 album by Grandaddy
- The Last Place, a 2011 album by Army Navy
