= Suburban Field Recordings: Volume One =

Studio album by Clem Snide
- Released: 2005
- Genre: indie/alt-country
- Label: spinART

Clem Snide chronology
End of Love (2005)	Suburban Field Recordings: Volume One (2005)	Have a Good Night: Live Recordings 1999-2005 (2006)

Suburban Field Recordings: Volume One is an mp3-only album released by alt-country band Clem Snide in 2005. It consists of early demos of songs from the band's previous albums. It was followed by two other Suburban Field Recordings albums, subtitled "Volume 2" and "Volume 3", respectively.

== Track listing ==
1. "Let's Make It"
2. "A Parable"
3. "I Heard My Mother Praying for Me"
4. "Make a Fist"
5. "Renegade"
6. "Horshack Shank"
7. "Amputate"
8. "Grow Me Up"
9. "Velvet Elvis Heart"
10. "Messiah Complex Blues/I Wouldn't Die for Your Sins"
11. "Safta Malca"
