= Lose Big =

Studio album by Eef Barzelay
- Released: April 15, 2008
- Length: 44:29
- Label: 429
- Producer: Jared Reynolds, Joe Costa

Eef Barzelay chronology
Bitter Honey (2006)	Lose Big (2008)

Professional ratings
Review scores
Source	Rating
AllMusic	4/5 stars
The A.V. Club	B–
Pitchfork	5.4/10
PopMatters	7/10

Lose Big is the second solo album by Clem Snide frontman Eef Barzelay. It was released on April 15, 2008, on 429 Records.

== Track listing ==
1. "Could Be Worse"
2. "The Girls Don't Care"
3. "Take Me"
4. "How Dare They"
5. "Apocalyptic Friend"
6. "Numerology"
7. "Make Another Tree"
8. "Lose Big"
9. "True Freedom"
10. "Song for Batya"
11. "Me No" (bonus track)
12. "Love the Unknown" (bonus track)
