= Hungry Bird =

Studio album by Clem Snide
- Released: February 24, 2009
- Recorded: 2006
- Genre: Alternative country
- Label: 429 Records

Clem Snide chronology
Have a Good Night: Live Recordings 1999-2005 (2006)	Hungry Bird (2009)	The Meat of Life (2010)

Hungry Bird is the sixth album by indie rock band Clem Snide. The album was recorded in 2006 and released on the 429 Records label on February 24, 2009 in both the U.S. and U.K. Lead singer Eef Barzelay has described it as a "loosely-conceived, post-apocalyptic fairytale."

Professional ratings
Aggregate scores
Source	Rating
Metacritic	64/100
Review scores
Source	Rating
AllMusic	3.5/5 stars
The A.V. Club	A–
Paste	8.5/10
Pitchfork Media	4.4/10
Robert Christgau	(2-star Honorable Mention)
PopMatters	6/10 stars

== Track listing ==
1. Me No
2. Born A Man
3. Hum
4. Burn the Light
5. Encounter At 3AM
6. The Endless Endings
7. Our Time Will Come
8. Beard of Bees
9. Pray
10. With All My Heart
