= Matthew Keating =

Matthew Keating may refer to:

- Matt Keating (rugby league) (born 1986), Australian rugby league footballer
- Matt Keating (musician), American musician
- Matthew Keating (politician) (1869–1937), Irish politician, Member of Parliament 1909–1918
