= Forever Just Beyond =

2020 studio album by Clem Snide

Studio album by Clem Snide
- Released: March 27, 2020
- Genres: Alternative country; indie rock; indie folk
- Length: 42:26
- Labels: Ramseur; Thirty Tigers
- Producer: Scott Avett

Clem Snide chronology
Girls Come First (2015)	Forever Just Beyond (2020)	Oh Smokey (2024)

Forever Just Beyond is the ninth studio album by American alternative country band Clem Snide. It was released on March 27, 2020, on the Ramseur Records label, and was distributed by the music distribution and marketing company Thirty Tigers. It was produced by Scott Avett of the Avett Brothers, who also co-wrote the album's songs with Clem Snide's frontman, Eef Barzelay. A tour had been planned to support the album's release, but this was delayed until 2022 due to the COVID-19 pandemic; ultimately, Barzelay performed solo with his guitar.

Professional ratings
Review scores
Source	Rating
American Songwriter	4/5 stars
And It Don't Stop	A–
Pitchfork	7.4/10

== Track listing ==
1. Roger Ebert
2. Don't Bring No Ladder
3. Forever Just Beyond
4. The Stuff of Us
5. Sorry Charlie
6. Easy
7. Emily
8. The True Shape of Your Heart
9. Ballad of Eef Barzelay
10. Denial
11. Some Ghost
