= The Ghost of Fashion =

Studio album by Clem Snide
- Released: 2001
- Genre: Indie, alt-country
- Length: 47:00
- Label: spinART
- Producer: Jason Glasser

Clem Snide chronology
Your Favorite Music (1999)	The Ghost of Fashion (2001)	Moment in the Sun EP (2002)

Professional ratings
Review scores
Source	Rating
AllMusic	4.5/5 stars
The Encyclopedia of Popular Music	4/5 stars
Pitchfork	7.0/10
Rolling Stone	3.5/5 stars
Spin	8/10
The Village Voice	A–

The Ghost of Fashion is the third album by indie rock band Clem Snide. The song "Ice Cube" was released as a single in Europe, and the song "Moment in the Sun" was used as the theme song during the second season of the NBC television program Ed, later spawning an EP of the same title.

The Ghost of Fashion was ranked the 3rd best album of 2001 by Rolling Stone critic David Peisner, and Robert Christgau ranked it No. 27 on his 2001 Pazz & Jop Dean's List.

== Track listing ==
1. "Let's Explode" - 4:10
2. "Long Lost Twin" - 3:30
3. "Ice Cube" - 2:13
4. "Chinese Baby" - 3:33
5. "Don't Be Afraid of Your Anger" - 3:20
6. "Evil vs. Good" - 3:51
7. "Moment in the Sun" - 5:30
8. "The Curse of Great Beauty" - 2:24
9. "Joan Jett of Arc" - 3:54
10. "The Junky Jews" - 4:20
11. "Ancient Chinese Secret Blues" - 5:39
12. "The Ballad of Unzer Charlie" - 1:57
13. "No One's More Happy Than You" - 3:29
