= The Meat of Life =

Studio album by Clem Snide
- Released: February 23, 2010
- Genre: indie/alt-country
- Label: 429 Records

Clem Snide chronology
Hungry Bird (2009)	The Meat of Life (2010)	Girls Come First (2015)

Professional ratings
Aggregate scores
Source	Rating
Metacritic	67/100
Review scores
Source	Rating
AllMusic	3.5/5 stars
The A.V. Club	B
Pitchfork	5.3/10
PopMatters	6/10
Spectrum Culture	2.5/5

The Meat of Life is the seventh studio album by indie rock band Clem Snide, released on February 23, 2010 on 429 Records. It is the first entirely new album by the band since singer Eef Barzelay's brief stint as a solo artist.

== Track listing ==
1. "Walmart Parking Lot" - 2:35
2. "Denise" - 3:28
3. "The Meat of Life" - 4:21
4. "I Got High" - 4:21
5. "Denver" - 3:45
6. "Forgive Me, Love" - 4:28
7. "Stoney" - 3:18
8. "BFF" - 1:58
9. "Please" - 2:24
10. "Song for Mary" - 4:23
11. "With Nothing Much to Show of It" - 4:57
12. "Anita" - 3:43
13. "Star of David (Bonus Track)" - 3:27
