= A Beautiful EP =

EP by Clem Snide
- Released: November 4, 2003
- Recorded: February 9, 2002
- Genre: indie/alt-country
- Label: spinART/Fargo Records

Clem Snide chronology
Soft Spot (2004)	A Beautiful EP (2003)	End of Love (2005)

Professional ratings
Review scores
Source	Rating
AllMusic	2.5/5 stars
Robert Christgau	(choice cut)
Pitchfork Media	6.7/10
PopMatters	(favorable)

A Beautiful EP is an EP release by indie rock band Clem Snide. It was released primarily to capitalize on the band's performance of the Christina Aguilera single "Beautiful" during live shows.

Two versions were released, one for the United States market on spinART Records, and a European version on Fargo Records with extra tracks.

== Track listing ==
=== United States ===
1. "Beautiful"
2. "All Green" (Soft Spot Album Version)
3. "Mike Kalinsky"
4. "I'll Be Your Mirror" (Live)
5. "Nick Drake Tape" (Live)

=== Europe ===
1. "There is Nothing"
2. "Happy Birthday"
3. "Beautiful"
4. "Sometimes I Feel Like a Motherless Child"
5. "Why Can't I Touch It?"
6. "Mike Kalinsky"
7. "Simple Man" (Live)
