= You Were a Diamond =

Studio album by Clem Snide
- Released: 1998
- Recorded: 1997
- Genre: Alternative country
- Label: Tractor Beam/spinART
- Producer: Adam Lasus

Clem Snide chronology
You Were a Diamond (1998)	Your Favorite Music (1999)

You Were a Diamond is the debut album by the American band Clem Snide. It was released in 1998 on Tractor Beam Records, and later reissued on spinART. It received favorable reviews and landed the band a following playing clubs in the Northeastern United States. As of 2002, it had sold about 1,000 copies.

== Critical reception ==
Professional ratings
Review scores
Source	Rating
AllMusic	4/5 stars
Christgau's Consumer Guide	(2-star Honorable Mention)
The Encyclopedia of Popular Music	3/5 stars
Pitchfork	7.9/10

The New York Daily News noted that Barzelay "sometimes gives into his sentimental streak, yet his mournful voice and elegant melodies make even his more gooey observations believable."

== Track listing ==
All tracks composed by Eef Barzelay; except where noted.

1. "Better" - 3:54
2. "Nick Drake Tape" - 4:07
3. "Row" - 4:11
4. "Your Night to Shine" - 3:58
5. "I Can't Stay Here Tonight" - 3:23
6. "Yip/Jump Music (Daniel Johnston)" - 3:49
7. "Uglier Than You" - 3:01
8. "Fruit Salad Stains" - 4:37
9. "Lost on the River" (Hank Williams) - 3:04
10. "Nothing Is Over, Not Yet" - 3:56
11. "Chinese Baby" - 2:33

The spinART reissue contained the following bonus tracks:

12. "Accident"
13. "Estranged Half Brother"
