= Moment in the Sun =

Moment in the Sun may refer to:

- "Moment in the Sun" (The Living End song), 2008
- Moment in the Sun (EP), an EP by Clem Snide, or the title track
