= End of Love (album) =

Studio album by Clem Snide
- Released: 2005
- Genres: Americana; indie/alt-country
- Label: spinART

Clem Snide chronology
A Beautiful EP (2004)	End of Love (2005)	Suburban Field Recordings: Volume One (2005)

Professional ratings
Aggregate scores
Source	Rating
Metacritic	78/100
Review scores
Source	Rating
AllMusic	4/5 stars
Entertainment Weekly	(favorable)
Paste	(moderately favorable)
Pitchfork Media	(6.7/10)
PopMatters	6/10 stars
Robert Christgau	A−
Rolling Stone	3.5/5 stars
Stylus Magazine	B−

End of Love is the fifth full-length album by indie rock band Clem Snide. The album includes longtime live staple "Weird", as well as "Made for TV Movie", a song about Lucille Ball which includes a duet between lead singer Eef Barzelay and the daughter of one of the album's guest musicians.

== Track listing ==
1. "End of Love"
2. "Collapse"
3. "Fill Me With Your Light"
4. "The Sound of German Hip Hop"
5. "Tiny European Cars"
6. "Jews For Jesus Blues"
7. "God Answers Back"
8. "Something Beautiful"
9. "Made For TV Movie"
10. "When We Become"
11. "Weird"

The European limited edition release included the following bonus tracks:

1. "The Ballad of David Icke"
2. "South American Lullaby"
3. "The Trick"
4. "Tiny European Cars" (KEXP Live Radio Session)
5. "Collapse" (KEXP Live Radio Session)
