= Soft spot =

Soft spot may refer to:

- Fontanelle, a human anatomical feature also called the "soft spot"
- "Soft Spot" (song), a song by Piri
- Soft Spot (album), an album by Clem Snide
- Soft Spot, a 2022 album by Chelsea Jade
