= Expo (album) =

Studio album by Marbles
- Released: March 15, 2005
- Genre: Indie pop, electropop
- Length: 25:25
- Label: SpinART Records
- Producer: Robert Schneider

Marbles chronology
| Pyramid Landing (And Other Favorites) (1997) | Expo (2005) |

Professional ratings
Review scores
| Source | Rating |
|---|---|
| Allmusic | 3/5 stars |
| Pitchfork Media | (5.0/10) |

Expo is the second album from the Robert Schneider solo project Marbles and is the follow-up to the 1997 release Pyramid Landing (And Other Favorites). Whereas Pyramid Landing was a showcase of experimental pop songs, Expo focuses more sharply on electronic pop music, similar to that of Gary Numan, one of Schneider's influences on the Expo. Other influences include Electric Light Orchestra, Brian Eno, Phoenix and The Cars. The liner notes for the album state a dedication to "Marci and Max". The album was released in 2005.

== Track listing ==
All tracks written by Robert Schneider.

1. "Circuit" – 2:32
2. "Out of Zone" – 3:46
3. "When You Open" – 3:52
4. "Magic" – 1:50
5. "Jewel of India" – 2:53
6. "Hello Sun" – 2:12
7. "Expo" – 0:59
8. "Cruel Sound" – 1:28
9. "Blossoms" – 1:39
10. "Move On" – 4:14

== Bonus material ==
On the CD release, there are six bonus mp3s that can be accessed by a computer. They include:

- "Robert's Commentary (Part 1)" – 3:57
- "Stars on the Sea" – 3:57
- "Boats on the Water" – 2:08
- "Robert's Commentary (Part 2)" – 4:05
- "Sleepy Boy (1987 Version)" – 2:56
- "Sleepy Boy (1988 Version)" – 3:32

Also included is a music video for the song "Magic".

== Personnel ==
=== Marbles ===
- Robert Schneider – synthesizer, mellotron, organ, toy piano, piano, vocoder, bass synth, electric guitar, Fender bass guitar, horn arrangements, electronic effects, drum machine programming, engineering, lead and backing vocals

=== Additional musicians ===
- Hilarie Sidney – drums on "Circuit" and "Hello Sun"
- Jim Lindsay – drums on "Cruel Sound" and "Move On"
- Rick Benjamin – trombone on "Blossoms"
- Merisa Bissinger – flute and alto saxophone on "Blossoms"
- Derek Banach – trumpet on "Blossoms"
- Hudson Berry – vibraphone on "Jewel of India"

=== Production ===
Expo was produced by Robert Schneider. It was mixed and mastered by Mark Linett at Your Place Or Mine Recording at Los Angeles, California with Robert Schneider. Drum engineering on "Cruel Sound" and "Move On" by Mark Linett at Cello Studios (formerly Western Recorders, Los Angeles, California). Album art was created by Steve Keene with layout and design by Dan Efram and Robert Schneider. Management was conducted by Dan Efram at Tractor Beam. Drum set sampling appears courtesy of John Goodwin.
