= Seneca Hawk =

US indie rock band

- Origin: Ithaca, New York, United States
- Genres: Indie rock
- Years active: 2007–2011
- Labels: Hinditribe
- Members: Jonah Rivera; Kyle Beswick; Ankur Bulsara
- Website: www.senecahawk.net

Seneca Hawk is a Los Angeles–based indie rock band consisting of Jonah Rivera, Kyle Beswick, and Ankur Bulsara.

== History ==
Jonah, Kyle and Ankur all met as students at Cornell University in Ithaca, New York. Upon Kyle and Ankur's graduation (and Jonah's early departure), the band moved out to begin their careers in Los Angeles. After playing their first national tour in 2007 and frequently playing at Los Angeles venues, including Spaceland, The Troubadour, and the Hotel Café, Seneca Hawk began working on Sun Year Long.

== Sun Year Long ==
Sun Year Long is the debut LP from Seneca Hawk recorded in Studio City, California, with producer Adam Lasus (Clap Your Hands Say Yeah, Yo La Tengo, Army Navy, and Oliver Future). The album was recorded analog on an Otari MX-80 24-Track 2-Inch tape machine and was mastered in Brooklyn, New York, by Joe Lambert. The album was scheduled to be released in early 2010. The first single from Sun Year Long, "Steal Your Heart Away," was released digitally on November 3, 2009. The song has been downloaded more than 500,000 times in the third installment of the iPhone game Tap Tap Revenge.

== Members ==
- Jonah Rivera – guitar, vocals
- Kyle Beswick – bass, backing vocals
- Ankur Bulsara – drums

== Discography ==
=== Albums ===
- 2010: Sun Year Long

=== Singles ===
- 2009: Steal Your Heart Away
