= Recordings 1994–1997 =

Compilation album by Space Needle
- Released: May 30, 2006
- Recorded: 1994–1997
- Genre: Rock, art rock, experimental
- Length: 65:11
- Label: Eenie Meenie

Space Needle chronology
The Moray Eels Eat The Space Needle (1997)	Recordings 1994–1997 (2006)

Professional ratings
Review scores
Source	Rating
Allmusic	link
IGN	8.2/10

Recordings 1994–1997 is a compilation album by Space Needle consisting of mostly previously released material from throughout the bands lifetime. The first eight tracks are mostly in chronological order, and the following tracks mix up the order.

== Track listing ==
1. "Eyes To The World" (Ehrbar) 3:40
2. ""Dreams"" (Ehrbar) 2:04
3. "Sun Doesn't Love Me" (Ehrbar, Parker) 3:09
4. "Before I Lose My Style" (Ehrbar) 5:41
5. "Scientific Mapp" (Ehrbar) 4:03
6. "Never Lonely Alone" (Ehrbar) 3:57
7. "Love Left Us Strangers" (Ehrbar) 3:56
8. "Old Spice" (Ehrbar) 3:26
9. "Cones and Rods" (Gatland) 2:29
10. "Put It On The Glass" (Gatland) 2:53
11. "Beers In Heaven" (Ehrbar, Gatland) 4:53
12. "(Untitled Duet)" (Ehrbar, Gatland) 2:57
13. "One Kind of Lullaby" (Parker) 6:17
14. "Where The Fucks My Wallet?" (Ehrbar, Gatland, Parker) 15:37

== Personnel ==
- Jud Ehrbar – drums, vocals, keyboards, guitars, percussion
- Jeff Gatland – guitars, percussion
- Anders Parker – guitars, vocals, drums, percussion

=== Additional personnel ===
- Max Buckholtz – violin
- John Parker – bass, vocals
- Adam Lasus – percussion
- J. Cox – percussion

== Reception ==
A review in IGN by Spence D. stated, "The sound of SN is a wonderful crossbreed of lo-fi prog, basement bred ambient, and clattering noise." The review concludes that the album is "a good introduction to the music of Ehrbar and Parker and a solid starting point for those willing to discover their subsequent output under the monikers Varnaline and Reservoir."

An Orlando Weekly review felt that, due to alleged disarray at the band's former label Zero Hour Records, "it's up to the fine folks at Eenie Meenie...to rescue these bits of cracked, self-indulgent indie introspection from obscurity," and praised the album for collecting "the highlights of the group's albums and singles...as well as some mind-bending live material."
