= Rudderless =

- Theatrical release poster
- Directed by: William H. Macy
- Written by: Jeff Robison; Casey Twenter; William H. Macy
- Produced by: Keith Kjarval; Brad Greiner
- Starring: Billy Crudup; Anton Yelchin; Felicity Huffman; Jamie Chung; Selena Gomez; Laurence Fishburne
- Cinematography: Eric Lin
- Edited by: John Axelrad
- Music by: Eef Barzelay
- Production companies: Unified Pictures; Tee Rob Pictures; Amberdale Productions; Bron Studios; Dog Pond Productions; Toy Gun Films
- Distributed by: Samuel Goldwyn Films
- Release dates: January 24, 2014 (Sundance Film Festival); October 17, 2014
- Running time: 105 minutes
- Country: United States
- Language: English
- Budget: $5 million
- Box office: $584,499

Rudderless is a 2014 American musical drama film which was the directorial debut of William H. Macy, and stars Billy Crudup, Anton Yelchin, Felicity Huffman, Selena Gomez and Laurence Fishburne. The film premiered at the 2014 Sundance Film Festival on January 24, 2014. The film was released in theaters and through video-on-demand beginning October 17, 2014.

== Plot ==
Josh Manning (Miles Heizer) is a college student recording his own songs in his dorm room, but is interrupted by one of his floor mates. He stops recording, annoyed at the interruption. Meanwhile, his father, Sam Manning (Billy Crudup), has succeeded in landing a large account at his advertising firm, and calls Josh to celebrate with him. Josh tells him he cannot make it but his father insists. Sam continues to wait at a bar for Josh, who has apparently stood him up, but becomes distracted by a news report of a school shooting incident at Josh's college.

Later, a memorial wake is held at Josh's home by his mother and Sam's ex-wife, Emily (Felicity Huffman). It is implied that Josh was one of the victims in the shooting, and media coverage of the shooting is causing Sam to have a difficult time grieving. At the memorial, Sam is then confronted by Kate Lucas (Selena Gomez), who tells Sam that she and Josh had been dating the year prior. Afterwards, Sam goes home and finds the media coverage is interfering with his daily life, and he eventually succumbs to alcoholism. Due to Sam's erratic behavior, his employer advises him to take time off to better cope with the situation.

Two years later, Sam has removed himself from his former life and is now living on a sailboat on a lake. He works as a contractor's assistant and continues to drink in his free time. His drinking leads Sam to show up to work late, and Sam's boss cautions him. Going for a drink with some coworkers after his day of working, he hides the details of his previous life and his true identity from everyone. Sam then notices the tavern hosts open mic events.

Returning to his boat, he encounters Emily waiting for him, who is requesting his signature to sell their former home. Emily is moving to Tulsa and is now the mother of a new son. She has also brought the remainder of Josh's music possessions, reminding Sam that Josh and he used to play music together. When Emily leaves, Sam begins to place Josh's possessions in a dumpster but stops, noticing the notebooks and discs. Sam begins to listen to them back on the boat and reads through the collection of lyrics and writings Josh left behind. He even begins to teach himself some of his son's material.

After work the next day, Sam decides to perform "Home", one of Josh's songs, at The Trill, and catches the attention of Quentin (Anton Yelchin), a young guitarist who was excitedly moved by the performance. Quentin tries to convince Sam to perform them together, but Sam declares he is not interested.

Quentin tries again the next day and shows him an alternate arrangement possibility for the song. The two end up sharing a meal and playing instruments together for the rest of the night. Sam neglects to tell Quentin that he was not the piece's actual author. At the end of the night, Quentin gets Sam to agree to perform together at The Trill. The next day, Sam is introduced to Del (Laurence Fishburne), the owner and operator of the local music supply store. Upon leaving the store, Sam watches a staged meeting between Quentin and Willy, a bass guitarist, in hopes that they can include him in their performances, but Sam is resistant to starting a band. The next day, the group meet to practice in the garage beneath Quentin’s apartment, and Quentin is very evasive about his own past. The group, now complete, has impressed The Trill owner (played by director William H. Macy) who asks them to perform regularly on Saturday nights as house entertainment, to which the band agrees—even Sam, reluctantly. The new name, “Rudderless”, quickly gains notoriety and local fame. Meanwhile, Quentin is revealed as extremely shy of the opposite sex, which Sam attempts to help him through, though Quentin finds the advice generally unhelpful.

Sam arrives at Quentin's apartment one afternoon and meets his mother, Joyce, who Sam mistakes as an older prostitute after seeing Quentin hand her a small amount of cash as they hug. Quentin is embarrassed because his mother has had issues with (unspecified) responsibilities, even spending his junior year of high school living in a car, and has vowed never to lower himself to that level of poverty again. At the mall, Sam buys Quentin new clothing to give him a style, and develop confidence from it. It does help a little, and Quentin begins to enjoy the attention Rudderless has gained him.

Following the show, as the band members are to go to a party, Sam sees Kate—now calling herself by her middle name, Ann, who shames him for playing the songs in public. The next day, Sam visits Josh's grave and finds it vandalized as Josh Manning is revealed to have been the killer in the school shooting incident where he died. Emily arrives with cleaning supplies, and implies that it is a fairly regular occurrence, and the two parents begin to clean off the graffiti from the headstone. Afterward, the two share some tequila, and it is revealed that today is Josh's birthday. Emily tells Sam that a couple of the other parents have reached out to her to forgive them for Josh's actions, but Sam still appears to be in denial. Emily insists that they had acted properly in their parental roles and they have nothing to feel guilty for and that Josh had to have been mentally ill to carry out such an act of violence.

Continuing to drink into the Saturday he is scheduled to work, Sam goes to his job and, finding a yard hammock, falls asleep. His employer finds and fires him. Sam assures him that he had already quit and walks away. Later that day, the other members of the band arrive with girls, and spend the afternoon on Sam's boat. As Sam goes below, the other members plead with him about a local block party they have been invited to play, and it is entirely possible it could lead to bigger and better opportunities for Rudderless in the way of airplay and exposure. But Sam is reluctant, now knowing that Josh's songs would never be accepted when people find out the truth of their authorship.

Sam visits Del the next day to acquire a new amplifier tube, and finds Del and wife Tina having gotten the RV stuck. Sam manages to get it out onto the street. Del asks him why he will not play the show, and Sam begins to question why he is really doing all of this. He arrives at Quentin's garage and insists that the song Quentin wrote will be the final song, finally pushing him out of his comfort zone.

Feeling good about the outcome, Sam makes his way toward the street stage and is surprised to find Kate/Ann talking to the other three members on the stage, presumably telling them the actual origin of the songs they all assumed Sam wrote.

She confronts him and tells him that the incident and her association with it had so interfered with her life that she had to change her name and leave school. She had been pursued and harassed by people and media alike, asking humiliating questions, even suggesting they had been members of a cult. Quentin asks Sam if it was true, and Sam acknowledges the truth for the first time. Quentin outright refuses to play the material and strikes Sam as he is walking away despite the other two trying to persuade him to play the material one time only, and then move on. Sam again goes into a drinking binge and returns home to the marina to find the Board had the area sealed with a chain link fence. Sam attempts to climb it and falls over to the opposite side, breaking the guitar neck of his guitar strapped to his back, ruining it.

The next morning, the scheduled sailing regatta Alaird warned him about is loudly underway. The sailboat procession is disrupted by Sam playing the 1812 Overture on his electric, sailing directly into the course of the other boats, and casting some over the sides of their own craft, for which Sam is arrested. He calls Del to bail him out and is surprised when Del tells him he knew who he was the entire time, but did not know the songs were written by Josh. The next day, Sam visits the site of the shooting, and finds the erected memorial identifying the shooting victims by name. Sam breaks down in tears of grief over the guilt of Josh's actions, but finally accepts that he has lost his own son despite what he has done. Sam then visits Emily, bringing her Josh's discs, and says that one day, the new baby will want to know who his half brother was beyond what history will paint him to be.

Sam then visits Del's store and discovers Quentin has discarded his instruments, telling Del to sell them on consignment. Sam then asks if the offer on the store was a "good offer", implying that Sam would be interested in buying Del's store. He then goes to visit Quentin at the donut shop where he works, and implores him to continue playing and writing even if it is without Sam. Sam tells him that he found performing Josh's material addictive, offering catharsis to his life and the bond with Josh. He concludes the visit, having brought back Quentin's guitar cases. One contains the Les Paul that Quentin so long idolized and wanted.

Finally, Sam performs the songs he had been working on, first admitting and telling the audience who Josh was, what he had done, and that he had written the song he was about to play. As Sam sings, it is revealed Sam has been replaced by a new guitarist, Del has been given Sam's sailboat, and Emily finally decides to listen to Josh's music.

== Cast ==
- Billy Crudup as Sam
- Miles Heizer as Josh
- Anton Yelchin as Quentin
- Felicity Huffman as Emily
- Laurence Fishburne as Del
- William H. Macy as Tavern Owner / Emcee
- Jamie Chung as Lisa Martin
- Ben Kweller as Willie
- Ryan Dean as Aiken
- Selena Gomez as Kate Ann Lucas
- Kate Micucci as Peaches
- Peter Spruyt as Alaird Dupree
- Suzanne Krull as Bertie Dupree. This was Krull's final performance before her death in 2013.
- Zoe Graham as Lizzie
- Mollie Milligan as Debbie D.
- Brad Greiner as Turk
- David Flannery as Jacob Taylor
- Stacy Cunningham as Joyce
- Joey Bicicchi as Quick
- Kenneisha Thompson as Keri
- Michele Rene as Tina
- Maurice Johnson as News Reporter
- Paul Carroll as News Cameraperson

== Production ==
Jeff Robison and Casey Twenter worked together on the screenplay for about five months in 2008. William H. Macy spent a year reworking the screenplay with the writers once he came aboard the project. Principal photography started on April 21, 2013 in Oklahoma City and Guthrie, Oklahoma. Scenes were shot at University of Central Oklahoma. Filming wrapped on May 26, 2013.

== Reception ==
On review aggregator Rotten Tomatoes, the film holds a rating of 64% based on 47 reviews, with an average rating of 6.3/10; the site's critical consensus reads, "Rudderless asks its cast to carry an awful lot of weight for its occasionally manipulative story; fortunately, this talented bunch—led by Billy Crudup—is often more than up to the task". On Metacritic, the film has a score of 52 out of 100, based on 19 critics, indicating "mixed or average reviews". While many critics spoke positively of Macy's direction, the soundtrack, and the performances of Crudup and Yelchin, many found issue with the third-act revelation; writing for Variety, Dennis Harvey described it as a "bewildering error in narrative judgement".

== Music ==
The soundtrack album was released on September 30, 2014 by an independent label. It features songs by Eef Barzelay, the film band Rudderless, Selena Gomez and others. The album peaked at No. 12 on Billboard Top Soundtracks chart.

1. "Home" – Billy Crudup (3:56)
2. "Over Your Shoulder" – Rudderless (2:32)
3. "Hold On" – Ben Kweller & Selena Gomez (3:09)
4. "Sam Spirals" – Eef Barzelay (2:29)
5. "Beautiful Mess" – Rudderless (2:31)
6. "Stay with You" – Rudderless (2:31)
7. "The Two-Year Hungover" – Eef Barzelay (2:21)
8. "Real Friends" – Rudderless (2:46)
9. "Asshole" – Ben Limpic (3:13)
10. "Some Things Can't Be Thrown Away" – Eef Barzelay (1:13)
11. "Wheels on the Bus" – Rudderless (1:40)
12. "A Day on the Water" – Eef Barzelay (1:04)
13. "The Gig Is Off" – Eef Barzelay (3:26)
14. "Sing Along" – Billy Crudup (4:26)
