= Pyramid Landing (And Other Favorites) =

Pyramid Landing and Other Favourites

Studio album by Marbles
- Released: 4 February 1997
- Recorded: 1992
- Genre: Indie pop
- Length: 37:09
- Label: SpinArt
- Producer: Robert Schneider

Marbles chronology
Pyramid Landing and Other Favourites (1997)	Expo (2005)

Professional ratings
Review scores
Source	Rating
AllMusic	4/5 stars
Uncut	3/5 stars

Pyramid Landing (and Other Favorites) is the debut album from Robert Schneider's solo project, Marbles, containing songs written and performed, usually in their entirety, by Schneider on his 4-track recorder. The songs date from a period before the concrete formation of The Apples in Stereo in the early 1990s, while Schneider was sharing an apartment with Will Cullen Hart and Hilarie Sidney, a period that also saw the recordings of the first Apples releases, and Sidney's material as Secret Square. It was eventually released in 1997 on SpinArt.

In the liner notes, Schneider dedicates the album to the following:

"Tom, Chris, David (my little brothers);
Hilarie, Sean, Jim, Will, Jeff, Bill, Mike (my best friends);
Ben Rogers, Brian Wilson, John Lennon, Syd Barrett (my heroes);
and all my cats."

== Track listing ==
All tracks written by Robert Schneider except where noted.

1. "Top of the Morning" – 2:10
2. "Swimming" – 3:50
3. "Sun to Shine" – 1:40
4. "Death My Bride" – 3:22
5. "Get Together" – 2:31
6. "Pyramid Landing" (R. Schneider/W. Cullen Hart) – 2:35
7. "Rather Be a Scarecrow" – 3:13
8. "Laughing" – 1:35
9. "Bottom of the Sea" – 1:20
10. "Kite" – 3:57
11. "Hidden Curtain" – 1:36
12. "Play/Fair" – 3:09
13. "Go Marilee" – 2:39
14. "Grant Me the Day" – 2:11

== Personnel ==
=== Marbles ===
- Robert Peter Schneider - vocal melodies and harmonies, Sears Silvertone acoustic and electric guitars, Fender bass guitar, sleigh bells, melodica, Casio SK-1 keyboard, Sears Silver Rhythm toy drums, flute, magic no.10 can, Dimension IV, maracas (or sand-filled envelope), Electro-Harmonix Octave Fuzz, recorder, Vox Repeat Percussion tremolo, jaw harp, Casio organ, Jay-Mar toy piano, drum-machine-for-a-metronome, percussive drinking glasses, Fisher-Price xylophone-piano, slide whistles, castanets, and sound effects from old records.

=== Also featuring ===
- W. Cullen Hart - tambo-drumming on "Pyramid Landing", clapping on "Go Marilee", double lead and backing vocals on "Top of the Morning", "Pyramid Landing", "Go Marilee", "Grant Me the Day", and others
- Hilarie Sidney - toy drums on "Go Marilee", inspiration for "Grant Me the Day"

=== Production ===
Pyramid Landing (and other favorites) was produced, arranged, and conducted by Robert Schneider. Recorded on a four-track cassette deck from March 1992 - May 1993, at the Elephant 6 Recording Co. H.Q. (Robert's apartment), Denver, Colorado; except "Pyramid Landing," recorded in W. Cullen's bedroom, Athens, Georgia, June 1992. Mixed by Robert S., December 1996, at Pet Sounds, Denver, through an Empex tube four-track and Roaldn Space Echo tape delay. Sequenced and mastered with Park Peters at Audio Park, Denver. All selections composed by R. Schneider, except "Pyramid Landing" chord progression by R. Schneider / W. Hart.
