= Bitter Honey (Eef Barzelay album) =

Studio album by Eef Barzelay
- Released: 2006
- Recorded: 2005
- Genre: acoustic rock, alt country
- Label: spinART
- Producer: Eef Barzelay

Bitter Honey is the solo debut album by American singer/songwriter and Clem Snide head Eef Barzelay. Essentially performed only by Barzelay on an acoustic guitar, it was released in 2006 on spinART records. Rolling Stone magazine ranked "Ballad of Bitter Honey" as one of the 100 Best Songs of 2006.

Professional ratings
Aggregate scores
Source	Rating
Metacritic	73%
Review scores
Source	Rating
Tiny Mix Tapes	4/5
Pitchfork Media	7.2/10
PopMatters	6/10 stars
Robert Christgau	(1-star Honorable Mention)
AllMusic	3.5/5 stars

== Track listing ==
1. "Ballad of Bitter Honey"
2. "Thanksgiving Waves"
3. "NMA"
4. "Well"
5. "Words That Escape Me"
6. "Little Red Dot"
7. "Let Us Be Naked"
8. "I Wasn’t Really Drunk"
9. "Escape Artist"
10. "Joy to the World"
