= Happyness (band) =

UK alternative rock group

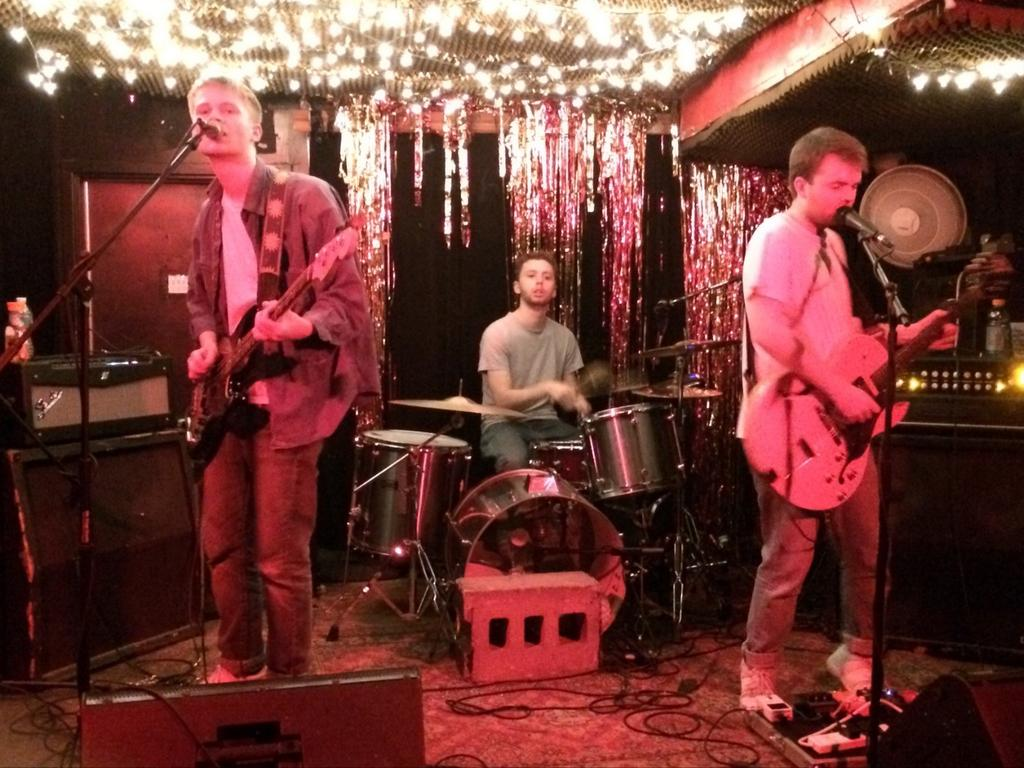

Background information
- Origin: London
- Genres: Alternative rock
- Years active: 2013 - present
- Labels: Weird Smiling, Moshi Moshi, Bar/None
- Members: Jon E E Allen; Ash Kenazi
- Past members: Benji Compston; Paul Abderrahim
- Website: facebook.com/happynessmusic

Happyness are an English alternative rock band based in London, England.

Their debut album Weird Little Birthday was released on 16 June 2014, later to be re-released in 2015 by Moshi Moshi Records in the UK / Bar/None Records in the USA, accompanied by four bonus tracks, including the previously excluded fan favourite "Montreal Rock Band Somewhere".

== History ==
=== 2013 – 2015: Weird Little Birthday ===
Initially meeting during educational pursuits, the core members of Allan, Compston and Kenazi shuffled in and out of various projects before making Happyness their primary output. Stripping their name out of the Brute Force song “Hello Moscow”, the band have explained the misspelling as a tribute to the Happy Shopper brand of convenience goods; “It's probably more of a 'satisfied with the quality and standard of...' kind of happy. Like Happy Shopper.”

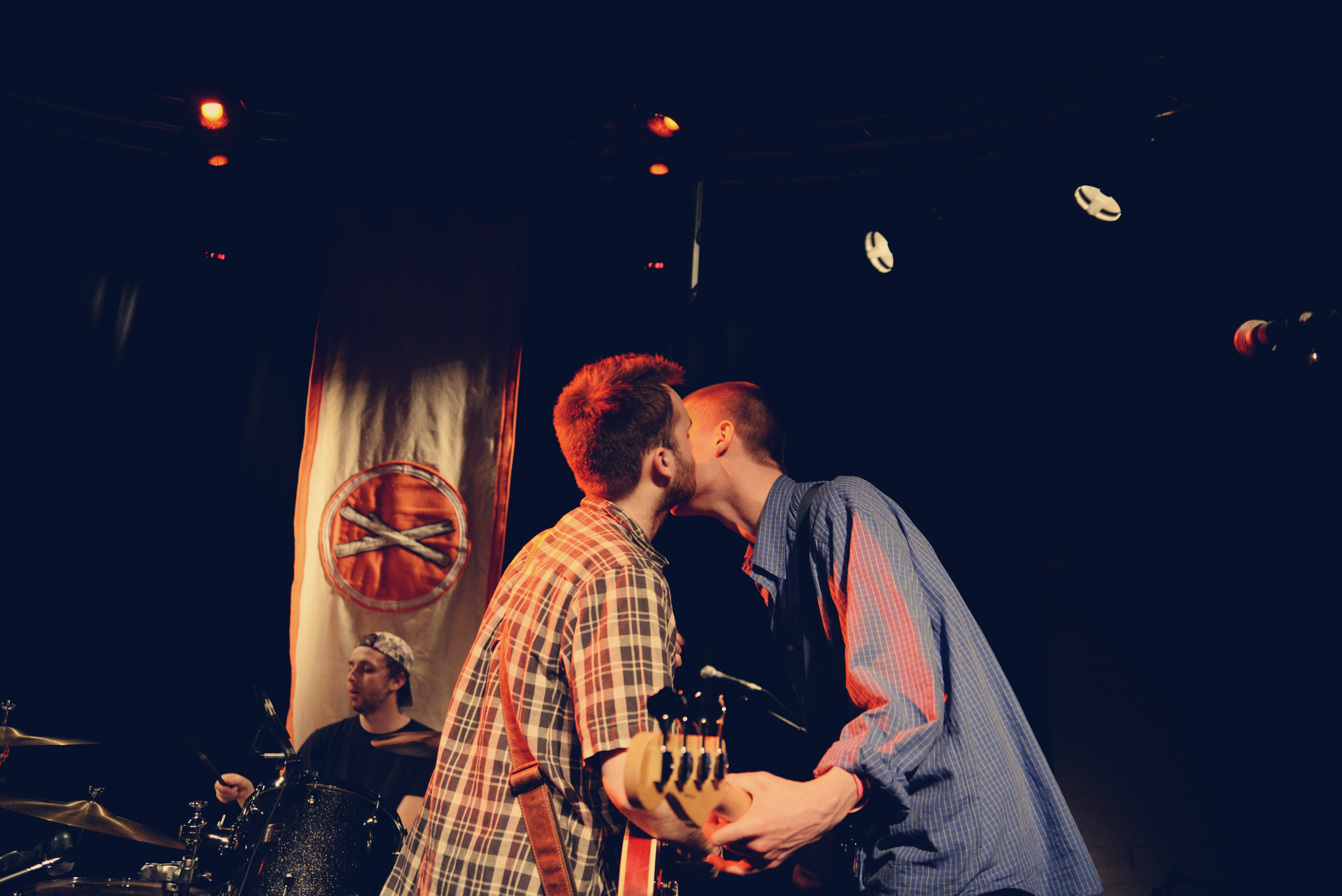
Happyness at Treefort Music Fest in 2015

Performing their first show at The Square, Harlow in November 2013, the group self-released the Happyness EP soon after through their own Weird Smiling label. Recorded at their base of Jelly Boy Studios, the EP was mixed by Ed Harcourt and mastered by Adam Lasus, two collaborators who would also contribute to their full length effort, Weird Little Birthday, which followed on 16 June 2014; Harcourt contributing vocals to Pumpkin Noir, and Lasus taking over mixing duties. Grammy Award winner Greg Calbi also helmed the mastering process.

Before long, the group managed to attract attention from a variety of labels who were keen to re-release their first effort. Both Moshi Moshi Records (UK) and Bar/None Records (USA) signed the group, commissioned a series of additional tracks and presented the record in its debut vinyl form in March 2015, which acquired further acclaim from NME, The Guardian, Sunday Times, Q, Uncut and Stereogum among others.

Festival appearances followed, with Reading and Leeds Festivals, Green Man Festival, Bestival, South by Southwest and End of the Road Festival playing host to the group, plus tours alongside Mac Demarco, Speedy Ortiz and Suede.

The group also won an award for Best Lyric at the 2015 NME Awards for the line "I'm wearing Win Butler's hair / there's a scalpless singer of a Montreal Rock Band Somewhere", lifted from the song of the same name.

=== 2016 – 2018: Write In ===
After touring in excess, the group reconvened at Jelly Boy Studios and spent close to twelve months assembling their follow-up. During this time, Compston and Kenazi battled with health issues which ultimately delayed the process, but returned with "SB's Truck" on 5 May 2016 – the first glimpse of new material ahead of upcoming EP Tunnel Vision On Your Part. Another single followed, "Anna, Lisa Calls", during which time the group toured Europe with The Dandy Warhols, eventually celebrating the release with a one-off headline show at Vauxhall City Farm.

After several further months of recording, their follow-up LP Write In was announced on 10 January 2017, accompanied by "Falling Down". During this period, the band toured with Twin Peaks (band), The Wytches, Fazerdaze and Her's.

Shortly after the completion of their second record, the lease of Jelly Boy Studios expired and the property was sold - therefore closing the studio for good.

=== 2019 – 2020: Departure of Compston and third album ===
It was announced on 12 February 2019 that founding member Benji Compston had left the group to focus on his family and new solo project, Jelly Boy.

On May 1, the group released their third record, Floatr.

== Discography ==
=== LPs ===
Title	Details
Weird Little Birthday	CD, digital; Released: 16 June 2014; Label: Weird Smiling
Weird Little Birthday (re-release)	CD, digital, vinyl; Released: 30 March 2015; Label: Moshi Moshi, Bar/None Records
Write In	CD, digital, vinyl; Released: 7 April 2017; Label: Moshi Moshi, Bar/None Records
Floatr	CD, digital, vinyl; Released: 1 May 2020; Label:

=== EPs ===
Title	Album Details
Happyness EP	CD, digital; Released: 25 November 2013; Label: Weird Smiling
Tunnel Vision On Your Part	Vinyl, digital; Released: 8 October 2016; Label: Moshi Moshi

=== Singles ===
Title	Year	Album	Format
"Great Minds Think Alike, All Brains Taste The Same"	2014	Weird Little Birthday	7", Digital
"Montreal Rock Band Somewhere" / "It's On You"	2015	Weird Little Birthday (re-release)	Digital
"A Whole New Shape"	2015	Weird Little Birthday (re-release)	Digital
"SB's Truck"	2016	Tunnel Vision On Your Part	Digital
"Anna, Lisa Calls"	2016	Tunnel Vision On Your Part	Digital
"Falling Down"	2017	Write In	Digital
"Through Windows"	2017	Write In	Digital
"Bigger Glass Less Full"	2017	Write In	Digital
"Uptread / Style Raids"	2017	Write In	Digital
