= The Technical Jed =

American rock band

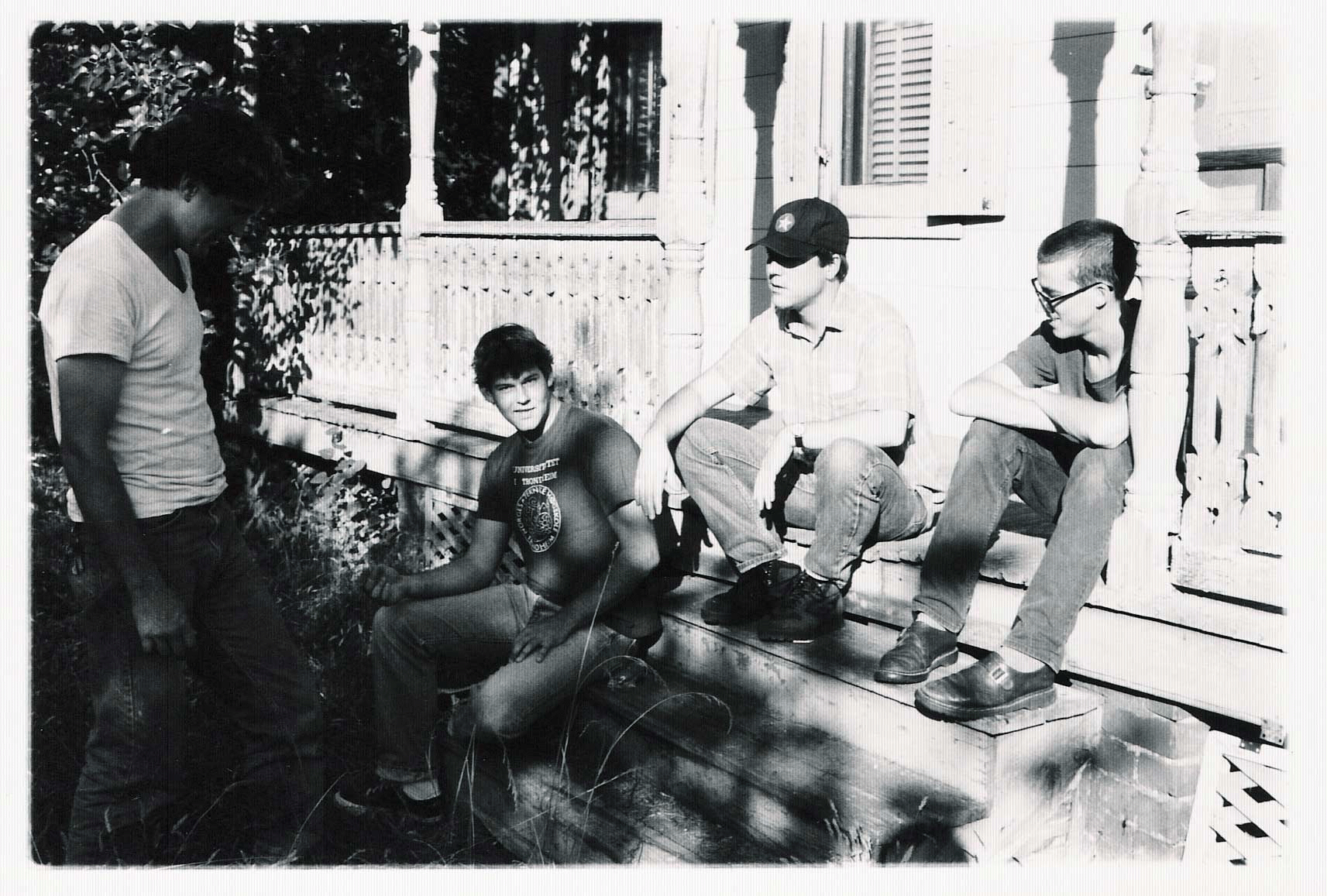

Background information
- Origin: Richmond, Virginia, U.S.
- Genre: Indie rock
- Years active: 1991–1996
- Labels: Brilliant Records; SpinART Records

The Technical Jed was an American indie rock band from Richmond, Virginia.

== Formation ==
The band started when Daniel Bartels and David Bush, who were working together at an oriental rug store, asked Clancy Fraher and Steve Brooking to join them. Fraher taught Bartels some open tunings on his new telecaster, then promptly left the country to explore Europe for a month. When Fraher returned, Daniel had begun creating his own musical vocabulary that was later crucial in setting this band apart from the typical 2-guitar bands of the day. Many reviewers likened them to Television.

== Southern States ==
The band did a couple of songs with David Lowery. The group's manager at the time, Caroline Frye, sent out six demo cassettes to a select group of indie labels. The New York-based SpinART Records signed the band to a deal. The first record, Southern States, was mostly a compilation of singles and material that had been released previously. It was a broad collection of rock flavors stirred over a few years. CMJ New Music Monthly called the album "alternately spacey and dense," writing that "with equal emphasis on crafted songwriting and biting guitar hooks, the band maintains a sense of style and flair." The album peaked at 46 in the CMJ chart.

The second record for SpinART, The Oswald Cup, was more of a concentrated effort. The group worked with producer Rich Costey to create an album that highlighted their guitar work and studied interplay with the rhythm section. The Washington Post called the album "a survey of indie-rock guitar-band styles ... With a little more personality, the album might even be as engaging as it is impressive." AllMusic wrote that "singing guitarists Daniel Bartels and Clancy Fraher spin murky and dark-hued waves of sound topped with liquid and melodic lead lines that regularly break out of the soundscapes just enough to keep the whole thing from skittering off into post-rock pretentiousness."

== Touring band ==
The regular rhythm section was restricted by career choices and were not able to tour. As a result, Fraher and Bartels chose to take members of their favorite Richmond punk bands out as substitutes. John Gotschalk (Kneivels, Nrg Krysys-bass), Ricky Tubb (Waking Hours-bass), Bret Payne (Morefire for Burning People-drums), Becky Sanchez-Burr (Morefire...-bass), and David Ramsden were among the few that took up the challenge. Fraher and Bartels found this method to be unsatisfactory and decided ultimately to hang it up after the release of The Oswald Cup. SpinArt virtually shelved the record temporarily and its release was never fully promoted.

== Reunion ==
The group reunited for a show on November 24, 2012, in Richmond, Virginia. It was a fundraiser for WRIR, Richmond Independent Radio. Clancy Fraher resides in Chicago and performs in The New Messengers.

== Stand in the Sun ==
In July 2022, Daniel Bartels learned that he had stage-4 colon cancer. Daniel told the band the news and when asked what he wanted to do, he replied, "I think I have a song or two left in me." The band began rehearsals for a recording and performed the song "Stand in the Sun" as part of their final live set on July 22, 2023, at the Dean*A*Palooza memorial for Dean Rasmussen. Daniel began hospice the day before the performance and died on September 6, 2023. "Stand in the Sun" is a clarion call to seize the day.

== Discography ==
- Kramer's Beach (single)
- Wyatt's Torch (EP)
- Southern States (album)
- The Oswald Cup (album)
- Stand in the Sun (single)
- Fourteen Sixteen (album)
