= Floatr =

Studio album by Happyness
- Released: 1 May 2020
- Length: 48:17

Happyness chronology
Write In (2017)	Floatr (2020)

Singles from Floatr
- 1. "Vegetable" Released: 22 January 2020; 2. "Seeing Eye Dog" Released: 4 March 2020

Professional ratings
Aggregate scores
Source	Rating
Metacritic	77
Review scores
Source	Rating
AllMusic	3.5/5 stars
DIY	4/5 stars
Gigwise	8/10
The Independent	4/5 stars
The Line of Best Fit	7.5/10
Loud and Quiet	6/10
NME	3/5 stars

Floatr is the third studio album by English alternative rock band Happyness. It was released on 1 May 2020 under Infinit Suds.

== Critical reception ==
Floatr was met with generally favorable reviews from critics. At Metacritic, which assigns a weighted average rating out of 100 to reviews from mainstream publications, this release received an average score of 77, based on 6 reviews.

== Track listing ==
Floatr track listing
No.	Title	Length
1.	"title track"	5:48
2.	"Milk Float"	4:53
3.	"When I'm Far Away (From You)"	3:10
4.	"Vegetable"	3:46
5.	"What Isn't Nurture?"	4:56
6.	"Bothsidesing"	3:24
7.	"Undone"	2:49
8.	"Anvil Bitch"	6:35
9.	"Ouch (yup)"	4:11
10.	"(I Kissed the Smile on Your Face)"	1:31
11.	"Seeing Eye Dog"	7:14

== Charts ==
Chart performance for Floatr
Chart (2020)	Peak position
UK Independent Albums (OCC)	39
