= Army Navy (album) =

Studio album by Army Navy
- Released: August 27, 2008
- Genre: Indie rock, power pop
- Length: 50:08
- Label: The Fever Zone

Army Navy chronology
Army Navy (2008)	The Last Place (2011)

Professional ratings
Review scores
Source	Rating
Pitchfork Media	(7.8/10) link
AbsolutePunk	(7.9/10) link
Sputnikmusic	(5.0/5) link

Army Navy is the self-titled debut studio album by American indie rock band Army Navy, released on August 27, 2008 on the band's label, The Fever Zone. Two singles were spawned from the album, "My Thin Sides" and "Saints", as well as the music videos for them. "Slight of Hand" and the non-album single "Silvery Sleds" appeared in the 2008 film Nick & Norah's Infinite Playlist, while the band's cover of Maxine Nightingale's "Right Back Where We Started From" was used in the Shrek Forever After teaser trailer and in the trailer for Parental Guidance.

The album was met with positive reviews from music critics, earning 7.8 out of 10 from Pitchfork Media and 7.9 from AbsolutePunk.

== Track listing ==
All tracks are written by Army Navy.

No.	Title	Length
1.	"Dark As Days"	3:41
2.	"My Thin Sides"	3:51
3.	"Saints"	3:47
4.	"Slight of Hand"	4:24
5.	"Unresponsive Ears"	4:46
6.	"Snakes of Hawaii"	3:52
7.	"Ignite"	4:33
8.	"Pocket Boys"	4:07
9.	"Jail Is Fine"	3:49
10.	"In the Lime"	4:09
11.	"Golden Pony"	5:38
12.	"Get Right Back (Where We Started From)"	3:31

iTunes bonus tracks
No.	Title	Length
13.	"Life of Lies (original release)"	4:05
14.	"Silvery Sleds (2018 re-release)"	4:07

== Personnel ==
- Justin Kennedy - lead vocals, guitar
- Louie Schultz - lead guitar, vocals
- Douglas Randall - drums, vocals
