= Your Favorite Music =

Studio album by Clem Snide
- Released: May 31, 1999
- Genre: indie/alt-country
- Label: Sire/spinART

Clem Snide chronology
| You Were a Diamond (1998) | Your Favorite Music (1999) | The Ghost of Fashion (2001) |

Professional ratings
Review scores
| Source | Rating |
|---|---|
| AllMusic | 4.5/5 stars |
| The Austin Chronicle | 3/5 stars |
| The Encyclopedia of Popular Music | 3/5 stars |
| The Guardian | 3/5 stars |
| Pitchfork | 2.1/10 |
| The Village Voice | B+ |

Your Favorite Music is the second album by indie rock band Clem Snide. The album was originally released as their major-label debut by Sire Records, but the label dropped them prior to the release. Clem Snide eventually signed with spinART Records, who released the album with a bonus track, "The Water Song." The song "I Love the Unknown" was released as a single in Europe.

== Track listing ==
1. "The Dairy Queen"
2. "Exercise"
3. "Your Favorite Music"
4. "African Friend"
5. "Bread"
6. "I Love the Unknown"
7. "1989"
8. "Loneliness Finds Her Own Way"
9. "Sweet Mother Russia"
10. "Messiah Complex Blues"
11. "Donna"

Releases of this album by spinART include the following bonus track:

12. "The Water Song"
