= Moment in the Sun (EP) =

Moment in the Sun EP

EP by Clem Snide
- Released: 2002
- Genre: indie/alt-country
- Label: spinART

Clem Snide chronology
The Ghost of Fashion (2001)	Moment in the Sun EP (2002)	Soft Spot (2004)

Professional ratings
Review scores
Source	Rating
Pitchfork Media	(7.5/10) link
Robert Christgau	link

Moment in the Sun is an EP by indie rock band Clem Snide. The release was intended to capitalize on the success of the song "Moment in the Sun," which was featured as the theme song to the NBC program Ed during its second season. It featured an edit of the title track plus some b-sides of prior singles released in Europe.

This album was recorded and released in "Super Hi-Fi" with special attention paid to preserving the fidelity of these recordings.

== Track listing ==
1. "Moment in the Sun" (Radio Edit)
2. "I Believe Your Lies"
3. "Now the Moment's Gone"
4. "Do You Love Me?"
5. "Your Favorite Music" (Master Key Mix)
6. "Moment in the Sun" (Album Version)
