= Soft Spot (album) =

Studio album by Clem Snide
- Released: June 6, 2003
- Genre: indie/alt-country
- Label: spinART
- Producer: Joe Chiccarelli

Clem Snide chronology
| Moment in the Sun EP (2002) | Soft Spot (2003) | A Beautiful EP (2004) |

Professional ratings
Aggregate scores
| Source | Rating |
|---|---|
| Metacritic | 74/100 |
Review scores
| Source | Rating |
| Allmusic | 4/5 stars |
| Entertainment Weekly | B+ |
| Pitchfork | 2.9/10 |
| Rolling Stone | 3/5 stars |
| Spin | A− |
| Uncut | 2/5 stars |

Soft Spot is the fourth studio album by alt-country band Clem Snide. The album was produced by Joe Chiccarelli and released in 2003 on spinART.

== Track listing ==
1. "Forever, Now and Then"
2. "Tuesday, October 24th"
3. "All Green"
4. "Close the Door"
5. "Action"
6. "Find Love"
7. "There Is Nothing"
8. "Strong Enough"
9. "Happy Birthday"
10. "Fontanelle"
11. "Every Moment"

== Personnel ==
- Eef Barzelay - Vocals, acoustic & Electric guitar, lead guitar on "Every Moment"
- Jason Glasser — cello/keyboards
- Eric Paull — drummer
- Pete Fitzpatrick — guitar
- Brendan Fitzpatrick (Pete's cousin) — bass
- Mary Roul — violin
- Mary Olive Smith — vocals
- Andrew Innis — saxophone
