= Marbles (band) =

Solo recording project of musician Robert Schneider

Marbles is the solo recording project of The Apples in Stereo singer and chief songwriter Robert Schneider. The project started out in 1993 when Schneider would record his various musical endeavors on cassette for various people he knew, but was somewhat abandoned as the Apples got off the ground. He would later compile some of the songs, many of which featuring backing vocals from Will Cullen Hart of The Olivia Tremor Control, and release them officially in 1997 as an album named Pyramid Landing (And Other Favorites).

Schneider appeared to have largely abandoned the moniker by 2000, releasing sporadic singles and contributing to a compilation. This changed when spinART released the second Marbles full length, titled Expo in January 2005. In November 2024, Schneider would return to compose under the Marbles name and produce the digital single New Emotion/Free From Grief.

In concert, Marbles is one of the more disorienting of the Elephant 6 bands. Most recently, touring with Of Montreal, Schneider appeared as Marbles dressed in goggles and a sequin jacket, backed by cardboard cutouts of Darth Vader and a robot, adorned with fake instruments, and a CD player supplying all but his lead vocals.

== Discography ==
=== Albums ===
- Pyramid Landing (And Other Favorites) (CD/LP) - spinART - 1997
- Expo (CD) - spinART - 2005

=== Extended plays ===
- Inverse Gazebo (Cassette Only) - Elephant Six - 1993
- Warm Milk and Chocolate (Cassette Only) - Elephant Six - 1993
- I ♥ the Animals (Cassette Only) - Elephant Six - 1993
- Marbles (Cassette Only) - Elephant Six - 1993
- Secret World (Cassette Only) - Elephant Six - 1994
- Laughing (Cassette Only) - Elephant Six - 1994
- I Love The Summer Days (7") - Elephant Six - 1998
- Christmas With Marbles (7", Ltd) - Bi-Fi Records - 2004

=== Singles ===
- Go Marilee/Grant Me The Day (7") - Elephant Six/The Bus Stop Label - 1997
- Dracula (7" split single with Casper And The Cookies) - Happy Happy Birthday To Me Records - 2007 (Note: Dracula was first recorded in 2005, and later published in 2007)
- New Emotion / Free From Grief (Digital Release) - Elephant Six - 2024
