= The Wilderness Inside =

Studio album by Army Navy
- Released: July 15, 2014
- Genres: Indie rock, power pop
- Length: 41:52
- Label: The Fever Zone

Army Navy chronology
The Last Place (2011)	The Wilderness Inside (2014)

Professional ratings
Review scores
Source	Rating
AllMusic	link
Paste Magazine	(8.3/10) link
Yahoo!	link
Earbuddy	(8.0/10) link

The Wilderness Inside is the third studio album by American indie rock band Army Navy, released on July 15, 2014 on The Fever Zone label. The lead single, "Crushed Like the Car", was released on July 15, 2013.

The album was met with positive reviews from music critics, getting 3.5 out of 5 from AllMusic and 8.3 out of 10 from Paste Magazine. Earbuddy named it the 68th best album of 2014.

== Track listing ==
All tracks are written by Army Navy.

No.	Title	Length
1.	"In Waves"	3:57
2.	"The Mistakes"	3:54
3.	"Crushed Like the Car"	4:35
4.	"Waiting to Win"	4:08
5.	"I'm Curious"	3:57
6.	"World's End"	4:06
7.	"Dumb Luck"	4:19
8.	"Pacific"	4:07
9.	"Spinning On the Record"	3:37
10.	"Birdy"	5:12

== Personnel ==
- Justin Kennedy - lead vocals, guitar
- Louie Schultz - lead guitar, vocals
- Douglas Randall - drums, vocals
