= Voyager (Space Needle album) =

Studio album by Space Needle
- Released: 1995
- Genre: Indie rock
- Length: 41:47
- Label: Zero Hour

Space Needle chronology
Voyager (1995)	The Moray Eels Eat the Space Needle (1997)

Voyager is the debut album by Space Needle, released in 1995. The band supported it with a North American tour.

== Critical reception ==
Professional ratings
Review scores
Source	Rating
AllMusic	2.5/5 stars
Robert Christgau	(dud)
Orlando Sentinel	4/5 stars
Spin	7/10

The Orlando Sentinel called the album "mysterious, often combining lo-fi sound and mock-futuristic sound effects." Guitar Player wrote that Space Needle "shoots into the astral realm with billowing feedback clusters, pulsating noise dementia, and scattershot drum grooves—like Hendrix playing the 'Star-Spangled Banner' in a Long Island basement."

Paste listed Voyager as the ninth best indie rock album of 1995.

== Track listing ==
1. "Eyes to the World" 3:40
2. "Dreams" 2:03
3. "Put It on the Glass" 2:49
4. "Beers in Heaven" 4:55
5. "Patrick Ewing" 3:49
6. "Starry Eyes" 4:56
7. "Before I Lose My Style" 5:42
8. "Scientific Mapp/Junky's Fingers/Callwood's Lament" 13:47

== Personnel ==
- Jud Ehrbar – drums, vocals, keyboards, guitars, percussion
- Jeff Gatland – guitars, percussion
