= Back to Blonde =

- Origin: Bronx, New York, Brooklyn, New York
- Genres: Indie rock
- Years active: 2004 - present
- Labels: Silence Breaks Recordings
- Members: Joe Rogers; Christian Linsey; Pat Malone
- Website: http://www.backtoblonde.com/

Back to Blonde is an indie rock trio from New York City who formed in 2004. Their music is considered noisy, guitar-driven rock, with lyrics that touch on personal anguish, love, and mythical characters.

Back to Blonde self-released their first record, Swim West, in 2004. The record was produced by Adam Lasus at Fireproof Recording in Brooklyn, New York.

Back to Blonde is recording their second record with Fireproof Recording in Studio City, California.

== Sources ==
- Fireproof Recording Web Site
