= Dan Cashman =

American television actor (1933–2019)

- Born: November 15, 1933; Minneapolis, Minnesota, U.S.
- Died: February 9, 2019 (aged 85)
- Occupation(s): Actor and audio book narrator

Dan Cashman (November 15, 1933 - February 9, 2019) was an American actor.

Cashman narrated a total of 14 of the audiobooks for Books on Tape. Some of the books he narrated are Murdering Mr. Lincoln: A New Detection of the 19th Century's Most Famous Crime by author Charles Higham.

Cashman appeared on such television shows as Dangerous Women, Silk Stalkings, The Invisible Man and The Pretender as Sydney's brother Jacob. His latest appearance on television was in The Perfect Husband: The Laci Peterson Story, a 2004 film. Cashman also narrated the 2007 film Rocket Science.

== Filmography ==
Year	Title	Role	Notes
1989	L.A. Vice	Auctioneer	
1991	Night Eyes 2	Senator Talbot	
1995	Prima Donnas	Bob Sterling	
1997	Kiss the Girls	Reporter #3	
1999	Yonggary	Lt. Murdock	
2007	Rocket Science	Narrator	Voice
2009	Boston Psychiatric	Dan - the Facility Manager	
