= At Home We Are Tourists =

Studio album by Settle
- Released: May 19, 2009
- Genre: Indie rock
- Label: Epitaph

Professional ratings
Review scores
Source	Rating
AllMusic	3/5 stars
Rock Sound	8/10 stars

At Home We Are Tourists is the debut album by American indie rock band Settle. It was released in May 2009 on Epitaph Records.

== Track list ==
1. "Grand Marshall's Mooncloth Robes" – 4:12
2. "Naked at a Family Function" – 3:46
3. "Rite of Passage" – 3:20
4. "ISO:: 40yr M w/Kids Seeks 26yr F w/o Kids" – 4:06
5. "Affinity for My Hometown" – 2:40
6. "I Saw an Inferno Once" – 3:04
7. "Murder" – 3:22
8. "Sunday, Morning After" – 2:54
9. "On the Prowl" – 3:26
10. "Kick. Win!" – 3:05
11. "Dance Rock Is the New Pasture" – 3:14
12. "Into the Mind of Those Who Commit Desperate Acts While Under the Influence of Others" – 4:15
