= The Last Place =

Studio album by Army Navy
- Released: July 12, 2011
- Genre: Indie rock, power pop
- Length: 46:46
- Label: The Fever Zone
- Producer: Adam Lasus

Army Navy chronology
Army Navy (2008)	The Last Place (2011)	The Wilderness Inside (2014)

Professional ratings
Review scores
Source	Rating
AllMusic	link
Pitchfork Media	(7.0/10) link
Chicago Tribune	link
Spin	link
Sputnikmusic	(4.5/5) link

The Last Place is the second studio album by American indie rock band Army Navy, released on July 12, 2011, on the band's own label, The Fever Zone. A music video for "Ode to Janice Melt", directed by Jeremy Konner and starring Jason Ritter and Simon Helberg, was released on September 15, 2011. "The Long Goodbye" appeared in the movie Beastly, while "Last Legs" was featured in The Way, Way Back.

The album was met with positive reviews from music critics, getting 3 out of 5 from AllMusic and 7.0 out of 10 from Pitchfork Media.

== Track listing ==
All tracks are written by Army Navy.

No.	Title	Length
1.	"Last Legs"	3:53
2.	"Ode to Janice Melt"	3:40
3.	"The Long Goodbye"	4:39
4.	"Ex-Electric"	3:50
5.	"A Circus"	4:03
6.	"Feathered"	3:01
7.	"The Hunter"	4:40
8.	"I Think It's Gonna Happen"	3:40
9.	"Wonderland to Waterloo"	4:41
10.	"Open Your Eyes"	4:17
11.	"Pastoral"	6:22

== Personnel ==
- Justin Kennedy - lead vocals, guitar
- Louie Schultz - lead guitar, vocals
- Douglas Randall - drums, vocals
