= Settle (band) =

American indie rock band

- Origin: Easton, Pennsylvania
- Genres: Indie rock, alternative rock, emo, pop punk
- Years active: 2001–present
- Labels: Epitaph Records
- Members: Dave Goletz; Willie Rose; Chris Burcin; Nick Rose

Settle is an indie rock band from Easton, Pennsylvania currently signed to Epitaph Records whose debut album, At Home We Are Tourists, was released May 19, 2009. The signing of Settle is part of Epitaph's efforts to expand its sound beyond its pop punk roots.

== Discography ==
=== Studio albums ===
Date of Release	Title	Label
May 19, 2009	At Home We Are Tourists	Epitaph Records
