= The Moray Eels Eat the Space Needle =

Studio album by Space Needle
- Released: 1997
- Genres: Rock, art rock, experimental
- Length: 66:18
- Label: Zero Hour
- Producers: Adam Lasus, J. Cox, Space Needle

Space Needle chronology
Voyager (1995)	The Moray Eels Eat the Space Needle (1997)	Recordings 1994-1997 (2006)

The Moray Eels Eat the Space Needle is the second album by the American band Space Needle, released in 1997. Its title is a tribute to a 1968 album by the Holy Modal Rounders. The album artwork is by the British artist Roger Dean.

== Critical reception ==
Professional ratings
Review scores
Source	Rating
AllMusic	2.5/5 stars
The Austin Chronicle	3/5 stars
Pitchfork Media	6.6/10

Entertainment Weekly wrote: "Whereas Space Needle genuinely broke new ground with the eerie, distortion-drenched sound collages of their debut, they now seem a bizarre parody of themselves, liberally mixing several of the most self-indulgent musical genres—from free jazz to prog rock—into one overlong, soporific outing." The Austin Chronicle thought that "Space Needle just can't seem to make up their mind about whether they want to be cacophonous feedback pushers or subtle purveyors of sweet melody."

Spin deemed the album "a handful of pretty 'lullabies' encased in an infinitely longer handful of space rock instrumentals."

== Track listing ==
1. "Where the Fuck's My Wallet" (Ehrbar, Gatland, Parker) 13:20
2. "Flowers for Algernon" (Ehrbar, Gatland, Parker) 7:47
3. "Never Lonely Alone" (Ehrbar) 3:57
4. "Love Left Us Strangers" (Ehrbar) 4:00
5. "Hyapatia Lee" (Buckholtz, Ehrbar, Gatland, Parker) 9:29
6. "Old Spice" (Ehrbar) 3:21
7. "Hot for Krishna" (Buckholtz, Ehrbar, Gatland, Parker) 2:33
8. "More Than Goodnight" (Ehrbar) 3:56
9. "Bladewash" (Ehrbar, Gatland, Parker) 11:44
10. "One Kind of Lullaby" (Parker) 6:11

== Personnel ==
- Jud Ehrbar – drums, vocals, keyboards, guitars, percussion
- Jeff Gatland – guitars, percussion
- Anders Parker – guitars, vocals, drums, percussion

Additional personnel

- Max Buckholtz – violin
