= Chris Harford =

American musician

Chris Harford is an American singer, songwriter, guitarist and painter.

== Career ==
The New Yorker described him as "...A singer, guitarist, and songwriter who rose through the local club scene in the nineteen-eighties, Harford operates in the free zone outside rock's usual categories. He has a foot in country, a hand in seventies rock, a toe in folk, a finger in post-punk. With his gruff but plaintive voice and his fondness for muddied-up guitars, he sometimes recalls Neil Young...". And according to National Public Radio, his music "has been described as 'beautiful, heart-rending and soulful,' as well as 'dark, rocking and dangerous'".

Harford's backing band, The Band of Changes, is a revolving door concept which has included notable musicians such as Kevin Salem, Jane Scarpantoni, members of Ween including Dave Dreiwitz and Dean Ween, Scott Metzger, Robert Seahag Mangano, Joe Russo, Eric Slick, Richard Thompson, and Michael Hampton.

Harford was born and grew up in Princeton, New Jersey, where he attended Princeton High School. He then attended Connecticut College before transferring to Massachusetts College of Art and Design.

In the early 1980s Harford was a member of the Boston-based band Three Colors that included Hub Moore, whose major label debut on Slash/London Records Harford produced in 1996; and saxophonist Dana Colley, who went on to be a member of the band Morphine.

In 1992, as Chris Harford and the First Rays of the New Rising Sun, he released Be Headed on Elektra Records. Subsequently, he released several albums independently:" Comet; Band of Changes; Wake; Live at CBGB's; Sing, Breathe, & Be Merry; and Time Warp Deck. His sixth studio album, Looking Out For Number 6 (2006), was produced by Dean Ween (who also contributed drums and lead guitar) and released by Schnitzel Records Ltd.

Harford's paintings were first shown at New York City's famed rock club, CBGB's. He has since had over 20 exhibits at galleries including Salt Philadelphia, and Gerald Peters New York City.

Harford has coached college and high school lacrosse at Princeton High School Princeton, NJ; Hendrix College Conway, AR; and Ransom Everglades Miami, FL.

== Discography ==
=== Solo ===
Year	Album	Label
1999	Comet	Black Shepherd
2006	Looking Out For Number Six	Schnitzel Records
2017	Horn of Plenty	Soul Selects Records
2018	Shimmering Waste	Soul Selects Records

=== With Band of Changes ===
Year	Album	Label
1992	Be Headed	Elektra Records
1999	Band of Changes	Black Shepherd
2000	Wake	Soul Selects Records
2002	Sing, Breathe and Be Merry	Soul Selects Records
2004	Time Warp Deck	Soul Selects Records

=== Work for other artists ===
Year	Artist	Album	Role
2016	Ashton Freeman	You Make Me Happy	Producer, drums
