= Army Navy (band) =

American indie rock group

- Origin: Los Angeles, California, United States
- Genres: Indie rock, power pop
- Years active: 2004-present
- Label: The Fever Zone
- Members: Justin Kennedy; Louie Schultz; Douglas Randall
- Past members: Ben Gaffin; Dave Marley

Army Navy is an American indie rock group from Los Angeles, California, consisting of Justin Kennedy, Louie Schultz and Douglas Randall.

== History ==
Their debut eponymous full-length album was released in 2008 on The Fever Zone records.

Besides their debut album, Army Navy has also contributed music to the films Beastly and Nick and Norah's Infinite Playlist.

Their second and third full-length albums, The Last Place and The Wilderness Inside, were released on July 12, 2011 and July 15, 2014 respectively.

== Members ==
- Justin Kennedy - Lead vocals, Guitar
- Louie Schultz - Lead guitar, Vocals
- Douglas Randall - Drums, Vocals

== Discography ==
=== Albums ===
- Army Navy - 2008 (The Fever Zone)
- The Last Place - 2011
- The Wilderness Inside – July 15, 2014
