= Space Needle (band) =

American experimental rock band

- Origin: Providence, Rhode Island
- Genres: Experimental rock, indie rock
- Years active: 1994–1997
- Labels: Zero Hour, Eenie Meenie Records
- Members: Jud Ehrbar; Jeff Gatland; Anders Parker
- Website: Official website

Space Needle was an American experimental rock band founded in Providence, Rhode Island, who were active from 1994 to 1997. The group was founded by Jud Ehrbar and Jeff Gatland, who made their initial recordings on four track tape. Anders Parker joined the group after the release of their 1995 debut Voyager.

== Band members ==
- Jud Ehrbar - drums, vocals, keyboards, guitars, percussion
- Jeff Gatland - guitars, percussion
- Anders Parker - guitars, vocals, drums, percussion

== Appearance in other media ==
- "Never Lonely Alone" from the album "The Moray Eels Eat The Space Needle" appears in Academy Award winning filmmaker Steven Okazaki's documentary Black Tar Heroin: The Dark End of the Street.
- "Never Lonely Alone" was featured in the Veronica Mars season 3 episode, "Charlie Don't Surf".

== Discography ==
=== Studio albums ===
- Voyager (1995)
- The Moray Eels Eat The Space Needle (1997)

=== EPs ===
- Space Needle

=== Singles ===
- Sun Doesn't Love Me b/w Sugar Mountain 7"
- Panic Delaney b/w Outta My Face 7" (1996)

=== Compilations ===
- Full House: Spring '96 (Various artists, 1996)
- Recordings 1994-1997 (2006)
