= Clem Snide =

Alt-country band formed in 1991

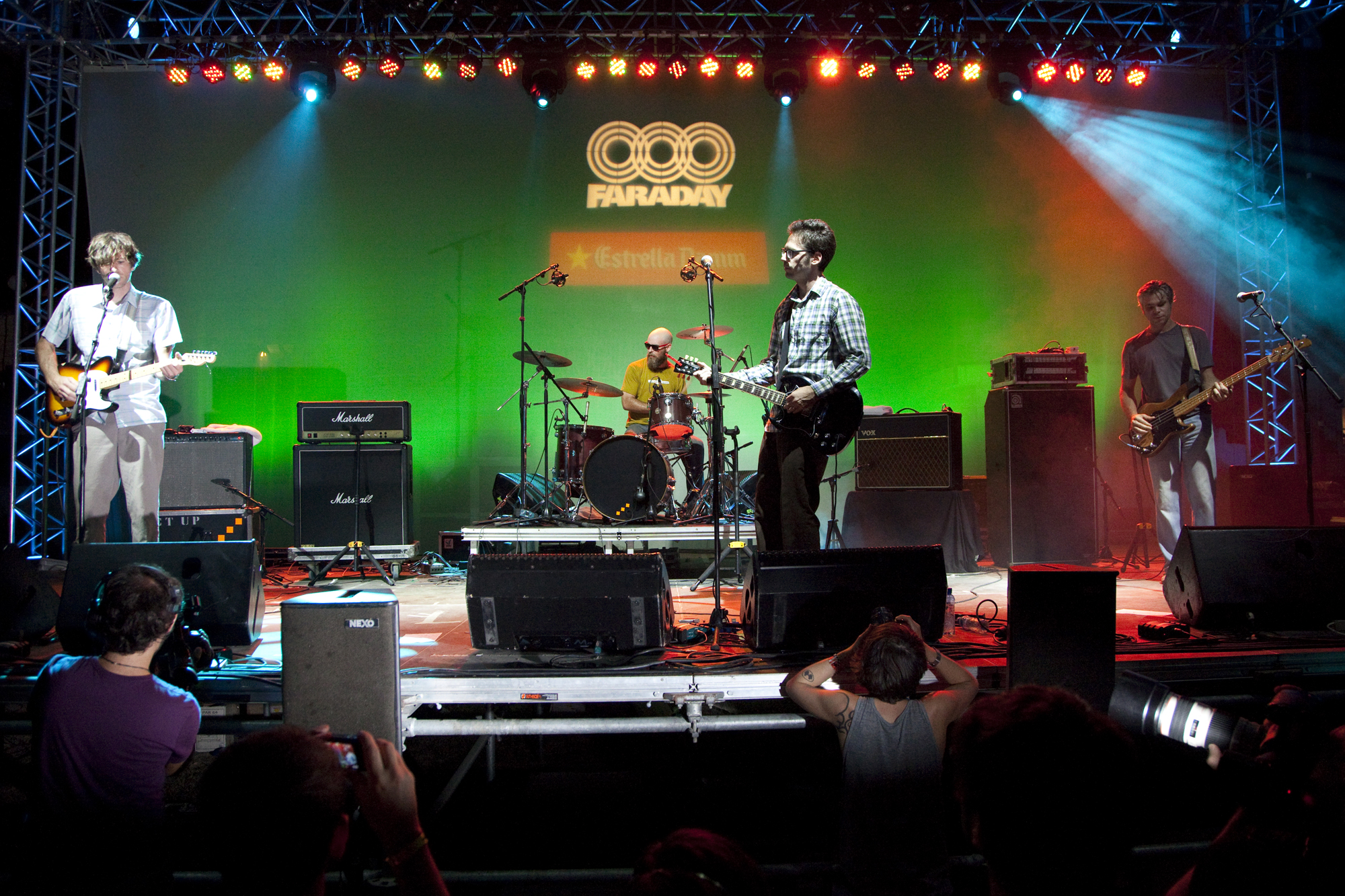
- Clem Snide in Barcelona, Spain (2010)

Background information
- Origin: Boston, Massachusetts, United States
- Genres: Alt-country, indie rock
- Years active: 1991–2007, 2009–present
- Label: 429 Records
- Members: Eef Barzelay, Brendan Fitzpatrick, Ben Martin
- Website: www.clemsni.de

Clem Snide is an alt-country band featuring Eef Barzelay (guitar, vocals), Brendan Fitzpatrick (bass) and Ben Martin (drums).

== History ==
"Clem Snide" is a character in several novels by William S. Burroughs, including Naked Lunch, The Ticket That Exploded and Exterminator!. The band Clem Snide was started by songwriter and singer Eef Barzelay, Jason Glasser, William J. Grabek Jr., and drummer Eric Paull in Boston in 1991. A few years later, with the addition of bassist Jeff "SweetBread" Marshall, the band made its first record, You Were a Diamond, with producer Adam Lasus. After building up a local following they attracted the attention of Seymour Stein, who then signed them to the Sire label for whom they recorded Your Favorite Music in 1999.

A couple years later Clem Snide released their third album The Ghost of Fashion on indie stalwart SpinArt Records. The record received some mainstream attention due to the song "Moment in the Sun", which was used as the theme song for the second season of the NBC program Ed.

After an ill-fated post-9/11 tour, the band began to unravel, but not before completing two more records: Soft Spot (2003) and End of Love (2005). After beginning work on another record, the strains of life in the music industry became too great and Clem Snide broke up. Barzelay went on to release two solo records, Bitter Honey and Lose Big.

In 2009, the band re-grouped and released their sixth record Hungry Bird on 429 Records. On February 23, 2010, Clem Snide released their seventh long-player, The Meat of Life, also on 429 Records.

The band's music featured in the series Californication, when "Faithfully" was played during the end credits of "Waiting for a Miracle", the fourth episode of season 5 (originally broadcast January 2012).

In February 2013, Clem Snide released a new track, "The Woods", which was written for "Senses", the second episode of the Professor Brian Cox-presented BBC science and nature show Wonders of Life.

"No One's More Happy Than You" from The Ghost of Fashion was featured in the eleventh episode of season 7 of The Good Wife that aired on January 10, 2016.

In 2017, Clem Snide's cover of "Beautiful" was used in the Netflix show Love, playing over the end credits of Season 2 Episode 4.

== Discography ==
=== Albums ===
- You Were a Diamond - CD - Tractor Beam Records - 1998
- Your Favorite Music - CD - Sire Records/spinART Records - 1999 (vinyl in 2010 via Microfiche Records)
- The Ghost of Fashion - CD - spinART Records - 2001 (vinyl in 2011 via Microfiche Records)
- Soft Spot - CD - spinART Records - 2003
- End of Love - CD - spinART Records - 2005
- Suburban Field Recordings: Volume One/Early Home Recordings: Volume One - MP3/iTunes - SpinArt Records - 2005
- Suburban Field Recordings: Volume Two - MP3/iTunes - spinART Records - 2006
- Have a Good Night: Live Recordings 1999-2005 - Self-released - 2006
- Hungry Bird - CD - 429 Records - February 24, 2009
- The Meat of Life - CD - 429 Records - February 23, 2010
- Suburban Field Recordings: Volume three - Amazon MP3/iTunes - snideco - November 23, 2010
- We leave only ashes CD 2013
- Birthing Pains - Mr It Productions - 2013
- Girls Come First - Amazon MP3/iTunes - Zahpwee Music - March 3, 2015
- Forever Just Beyond - Ramseur Records - March 27, 2020
- Beyond Forever Just Beyond - Ramseur Records - June 23, 2021
- Oh Smokey - Foreign Leisure Records - September 2024

=== EPs ===
- Moment in the Sun EP - CD - spinART Records - 2002
- A Beautiful EP - CD - spinART Records - 2004
- A Beautiful EP - CD - Fargo Records - 2004 (European release)
- Clem Snide's Journey EP (Vinyl, Digital Download)- Bandcamp release - June 29, 2011
- Smothered & Covered Vol. 1 - June 11, 2021

=== Singles ===
- "I Love the Unknown" - CD - Cooking Vinyl - 1999 (European release)
- "Ice Cube" - CD - Cooking Vinyl - 2001 (European release)
- "Song for Bob Crane/Frustrated Poet" - 7" - Self Starter Foundation - 2001
- "Moment in the Sun" - CD - Cooking Vinyl - 2001

== Non-album compilation tracks ==
- "Tears on My Pillow", a cover of Little Anthony and the Imperials, from Stubbs the Zombie: The Soundtrack (2005)
- "Don't Let the Sun Go Down on Your Grievance", from The Late Great Daniel Johnston: Discovered Covered
- "Keep Your Feelings to Yourself", from This Is Next Year: A Brooklyn-Based Compilation
- "Accident", from Never Kept a Diary Compilation on Motorcoat records
- "The Ballad of David Icke", from Future Soundtrack for America
