= Matt Keating (musician) =

American singer

- Origin: United States
- Genres: Folk rock / pop
- Occupation: Singer-songwriter
- Years active: 1993–present
- Labels: Alias (1993); Poptones/Future Farmer (2001); Kealon/Redeye (2006); Kealon/MRI/RED (2008); LoveCat Music
- Website: Matt Keating

Matt Keating is an American singer-songwriter from Boston, Massachusetts, United States. His music has been described in terms of various genres, including Americana, power-pop, rock, and folk rock.

== Biography ==
Keating grew up in the Boston area and first began performing as a pianist in local clubs. He played in several local bands, including Circle Sky, before moving to New York City, where he eventually signed with Alias Records.

After several releases on Alias, he took an extended break from recording, returning in 2003 with the Tilt a Whirl album.

== Discography ==
- Satan Sings EP (Alias Records, 1993)
- Tell it to Yourself (Alias Records, 1993)
- Scaryarea (Alias Records, 1995)
- Candy Valentine EP (Alias Records, 1996)
- Killjoy (Alias Records, 1997)
- Tilt a Whirl (Poptones, 2003)
- Summer Night (Kealon Records, 2006)
- Quixotic (MRI Records, 2008)
- Between The Customers (Kealon Records, 2010)
- Wrong Way Home (Sojourn Records, 2012)
- This Perfect Crime (Janglewood Records, 2015)
