= Eef Barzelay =

Israeli-American musician

Eef Barzelay איף ברזילי
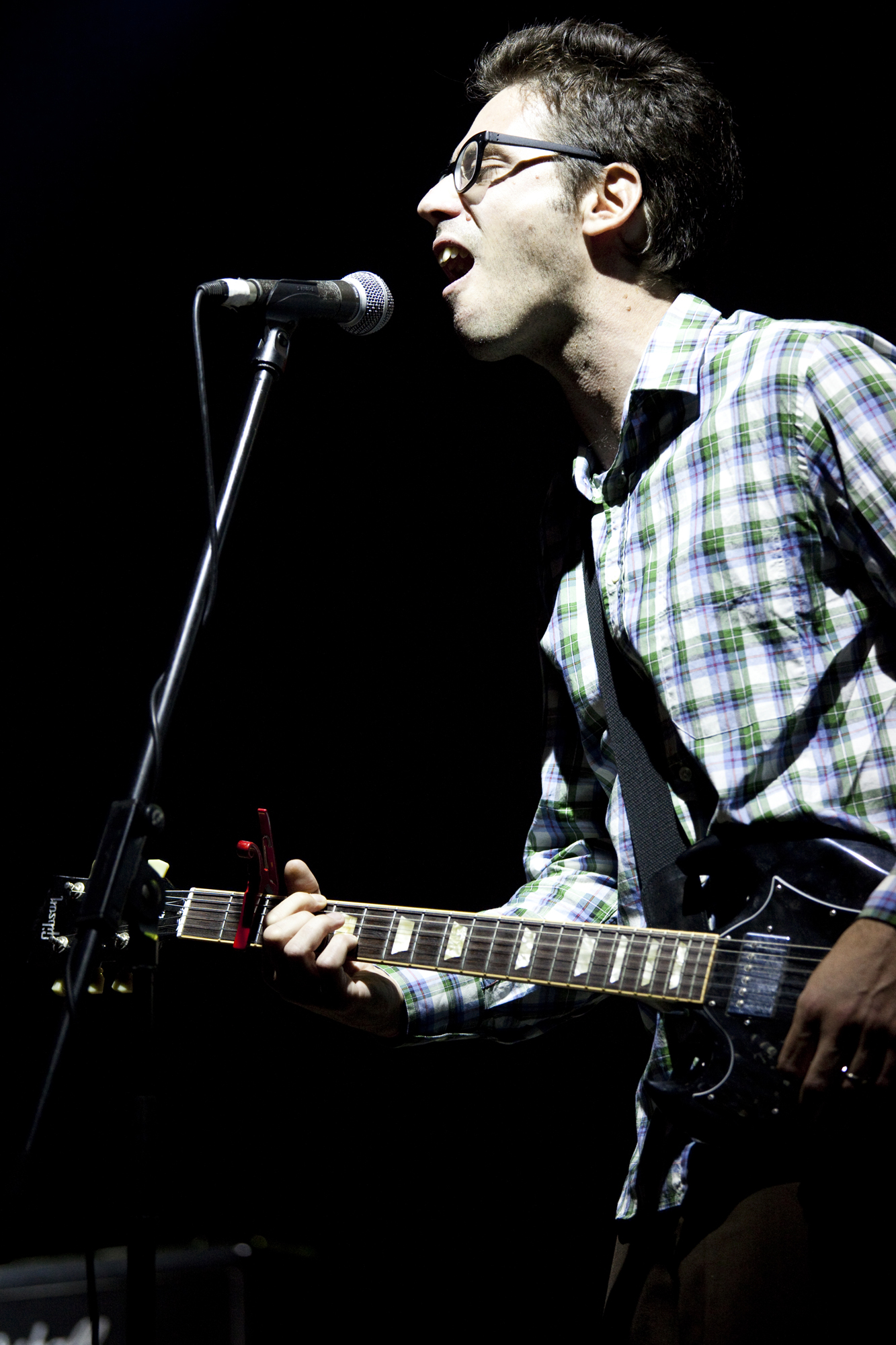

Background information
- Birth name: Ifar Barzelay
- Born: May 12, 1970 (age 55); Tel Aviv, Israel
- Origin: New Jersey
- Genres: Alternative country, alternative rock, pop
- Occupation(s): Singer-songwriter, musician
- Instrument(s): Vocals, guitar, ukulele
- Years active: 1991–present
- Labels: spinART Records, 429 Records, Cloverdale Records
- Website: www.clemsni.de

Ifar "Eef" Barzelay (Hebrew: איפר "איף" ברזילי; born May 12, 1970) is an Israeli-American musician. He is the principal songwriter and singer of alternative country band Clem Snide, but has also toured as a solo act, both as a headliner and in support of various artists such as Ben Folds.

== Early life ==
Born in Tel Aviv, Israel on May 12, 1970, Barzelay grew up in Teaneck, New Jersey, and attended Teaneck High School.

== Career ==
In 2006, Barzelay released his debut solo album entitled Bitter Honey. In 2007, he composed many original tracks for the film Rocket Science. Barzelay's second solo album, Lose Big, was released on June 17, 2008, on 429 records. In 2009, Barzelay reformed Clem Snide.

At the A.V. Fest 2011 in Chicago, Illinois, Barzelay performed the music of the popular rock band Journey.

In 2014 Barzelay recorded a version of Bee Gees's "How Can You Mend a Broken Heart" for a fundraising CD titled "More Super Hits Of The Seventies" for radio station WFMU. He also wrote and recorded five songs for the Rudderless soundtrack such as "Sam Spirals" and "A Day on the Water".

== Discography ==
- Bitter Honey (CD) – spinART – February 21, 2006
- Rocket Science (Original Motion Picture Soundtrack) (CD) – Lakeshore Records – August 7, 2007
- Lose Big (CD) – 429 Records – June 17, 2008
- Black Tin Rocket: Songs of the Transmissionary Six EP (Digital download) – Bandcamp release – March 14, 2011
- Bitter Honey (Redux) (Digital Download) – Bandcamp release – March 31, 2011
- Clem Snide's Journey (Vinyl, Digital Download) – Bandcamp release – June 29, 2011
- Fan Chosen Covers (Best lets see if this works Of) (Digital download) – Bandcamp release – September 20, 2011
- Janie Jones - Original Motion Picture Soundtrack (CD, digital download) – Nettwerk – October 11, 2011
- Girls Come First (Digital Download) Bandcamp release – March 4, 2015
- Oh, Smokey (Vinyl, CD, Digital Download) - Cloverdale Records - November 15, 2024
