= SpinART Records =

Record label from New York, 1991–2007

- Founded: 1991
- Founder: Joel Morowitz and Jeff Price
- Defunct: 2007
- Genre: Pop; rock
- Country of origin: US
- Location: New York City

SpinART Records was a New York City-based independent record label that released recordings by the Apples in Stereo, Clem Snide, Frank Black, and Michael Penn. Billboard referred to SpinART as "a proven breeding ground for new talent."

The label was started by Joel Morowitz and Jeff Price in 1991. Its first release was the ...One Last Kiss compilation, which featured tracks from Velocity Girl, Lilys, Black Tambourine, Magnetic Fields, and others. The Washington Post described the compilation as "a sort of sonic fanzine" that was "dominated by guitar-based, female-fronted dream-pop bands."

In May 1994, SpinART signed a distribution deal with Columbia Records. The label shifted to a new distribution deal with Giant Records in October 1995, with Giant funding much of the label's operations and Morowitz and Price maintaining full creative control of the label's direction. "We do our own thing and market it and bust our butts and Giant leaves us alone," Price said.

SpinART filed for bankruptcy in April 2007 and went out of business.

In the years following the end of SpinART, Price became founder and CEO of digital music auditing company Audiam. He also co-founded the digital music service TuneCore.

Morowitz went on to own Ecstatic Electric, which rented out high-end vintage music gear. Morowitz died in Bethesda, Maryland on October 6, 2022.

== Artists ==
- Apollo Sunshine
- The Apples in Stereo
- Augie March
- Eef Barzelay
- Bis
- Black Francis
- Frank Black
- The Boo Radleys
- Bunny Summer
- By Divine Right
- Vic Chesnutt
- The Church
- Cinerama
- Clem Snide
- Creeper Lagoon
- Cub
- The Dambuilders
- The Dears
- Detachment Kit
- Eels
- Elf Power
- Eyes Adrift
- Jason Falkner
- Fastbacks
- The Flashing Lights
- The Goldenrods
- Bill Fox
- Halo Bit
- Hank Dogs
- Head of Femur
- Hockey Night
- Holiday
- Hot IQs
- Bill Janovitz
- John Doe Thing
- KaitO
- Tommy Keene
- The Lilac Time
- Lilys
- Lotion
- Lois Maffeo
- The Magnetic Fields
- Marbles
- Mazarin
- Me (band)
- MC Honky
- The Minders
- Nellie McKay
- Monsterland
- The Orange Peels
- Michael Penn
- Pere Ubu
- Pixies
- Poole
- Poster Children
- Regia
- The Revelers
- Small Factory
- Soft Cell
- Squatweiler
- Suddenly, Tammy!
- The Sunshine Fix
- The Technical Jed
- Throw That Beat in the Garbage Can
- Trampoline
- The Trash Can Sinatras
- The Wedding Present
- White Town
- You Am I
- Zeke Fiddler

== See also ==
- List of record labels
