= Theryl DeClouet =

Theryl DeClouet (September 17, 1951 – July 15, 2018), also known as House Man, was an American soul/R&B singer, best known as the one-time lead vocalist of the musical group Galactic.

Born in Hollygrove, New Orleans, Louisiana, United States, he appeared on Galactic's first four studio albums as well as a live release and a compilation before health concerns forced his departure from the band and its heavy tour schedule. His independent solo release, The Truth Iz Out, featured support from longtime friend Ivan Neville and guitarist June Yamagishi of Papa Grows Funk. He also appeared on Charlie Hunter Quintet's 2001 album, Songs from the Analog Playground, Hunter's first to feature vocals. DeClouet sang on versions of Earth, Wind & Fire's "Mighty Mighty" and the Willie Dixon standard "Spoonful."

In 2005, DeClouet also briefly appeared as Judge Locke Randolph in The Dukes of Hazzard.

On July 15, 2018, DeClouet died at the age of 66.

== Solo discography ==
- Separate Rooms - Pyramid Records (1987)
- Open Up Your Heart - Pyramid Records, Hot Soul Records (1989)
- The Houseman Cometh! - Bullseye Blues Records (2001)
- The Truth Iz Out - Self-released (2007)

== Appearances with Galactic ==
- Coolin' Off - Fog City Records (1996)
- Crazyhorse Mongoose - Capricorn (1998)
- Late for the Future - Polygram (2000)
- We Love 'Em Tonight: Live at Tipitina's - Volcano Records (2001)
- Vintage Reserve - Volcano Records (2003)
- Ruckus - Sanctuary Records (2003)
