= Stanton Moore =

American drummer (born 1972)

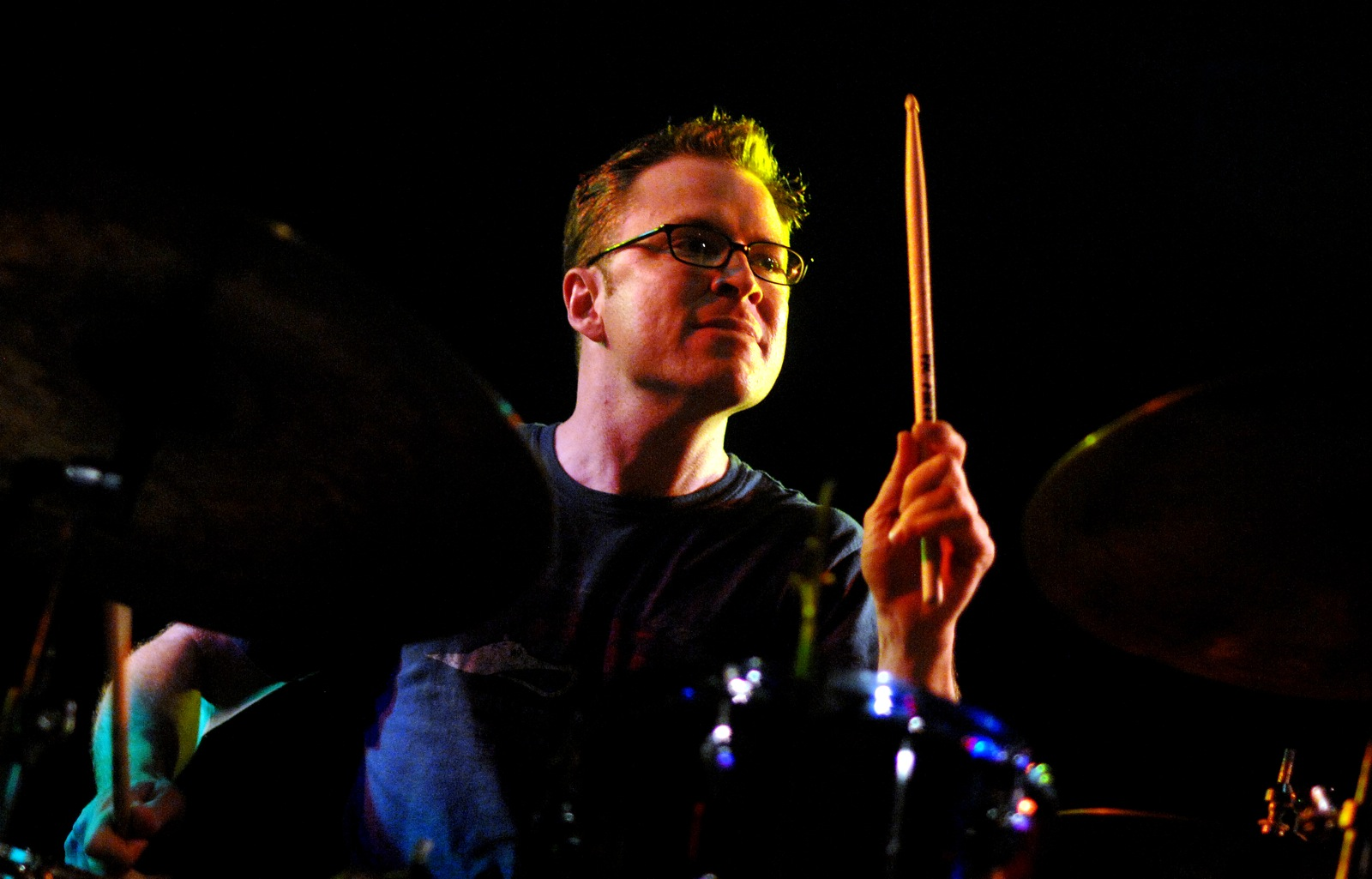
- Moore with Garage A Benevento at Tipitina's May 2, 2007

Background information
- Born: July 9, 1972 (age 54)
- Origin: New Orleans, Louisiana, U.S.
- Genres: Alternative rock, jazz funk, blues, heavy metal, funk rock
- Occupation: Musician
- Instrument: Drums
- Years active: Since the 1990s
- Labels: Telarc, Verve, Blue Thumb, Fog City
- Website: www.stantonmoore.com

Stanton Moore (born July 9, 1972) is an American rock drummer from New Orleans. Most widely known as a founding member of Galactic, Moore has also pursued a solo recording career (beginning with his 1998 debut All Kooked Out!) and recorded with bands as diverse as jazz-funk keyboardist Robert Walter and heavy metal act Corrosion of Conformity.

He also travels internationally to teach New Orleans drumming, writes regularly for drumming magazines, and releases instructional books and videos. In 2017 Moore established the Stanton Moore Drum Academy.

== Career ==
Moore was raised in Metairie in suburban New Orleans.

As of 2008 some of Moore's recent projects include the Stanton Moore Trio, Garage A Trois and the Midnite Disturbers. Moore performs with his Stanton Moore Trio including a variety of local and visiting musicians in New Orleans. As a trio he has toured nationally with keyboardist Robert Walter and guitarist Will Bernard. Additionally, Walter and Bernard are the credited musicians on Moore's two most recent solo albums. Moore continues to perform with his co-founded Garage A Trois with Skerik, Mike Dillon and Marco Benevento. Moore organized the all-star brass band Midnite Disturbers with drummer Kevin O'Day. The Midnite Disturbers are Trombone Shorty and Jamelle Williams on trumpets, Big Sam and Mark Mullins on trombones, Ben Ellman and Skerik on saxophones, Jeffery Hills on sousaphone and Kevin O’Day and Moore on drums.

Other ongoing collaborations include bands such as Dragon Smoke and MG5. Dragon Smoke features Eric Lindell, Robert Mercurio, Ivan Neville and Stanton Moore. MG5 (formerly Frequinox) features Robert Walter, Robert Mercurio, Will Bernard, Donald Harrison, Jeff Coffin and Stanton Moore.

Since Hurricane Katrina, Moore has helped start and participates in the Tipitina's Foundation workshop for students, providing young people an opportunity to learn, play and perform with professional musicians.

Moore has collaborated with Tom Morello of Rage Against the Machine and Boots Riley of The Coup on a project under the name Street Sweeper Social Club, which released an album on June 16, 2009.

Moore released Emphasis! (On Parenthesis) on Telarc April 2008 as Stanton Moore Trio. The trio consists of longtime associates Robert Walter and Will Bernard.

In 2022, Moore returned to Corrosion of Conformity as session drummer, following the death of longtime drummer Reed Mullin in 2020.

== Other pursuits ==
At the 2009 Winter NAMM Show in Anaheim, California Stanton Moore introduced a signature model snare drum under his own brand, The Stanton Moore Drum company of New Orleans. The drum is 4.5" x 14" made of titanium. Stanton worked closely with drum designer Ronn Dunnett to create a drum that embodied the sound of a classic vintage snare drum that Stanton had once owned.

Moore was also co-owner of the Crescent Cymbals brand. His signature cymbal series was incorporated into the Stanton Moore Crescent Series cymbals, now produced by Sabian.

In January 2020, the Avedis Zildjian Company announced that Stanton had joined their artist roster. In addition to Zildjian, Moore also plays Gretsch drums and Remo drumheads. He also uses Vic Firth drumsticks, DW pedals, hardware, and accessories, and LP Percussion.

In July 2011 issue of Modern Drummer, Moore won the reader polls in both the Educational Book, and Educational DVD, categories for his Groove Alchemy educational series.

In 2017 Moore launched the Stanton Moore Drum Academy as a forward thinking online educational community for drummers and teachers of all levels and styles. The drumming curriculum is divided into several categories. Studies begin with A Fresh Approach to the Drumset, a comprehensive pedagogy co penned with well respected veteran educator, Mark Wessels. The instructional content is broken into 34 video lessons, with accompanying notation, and progresses from beginning to advanced material. Moore's Academy Lessons offer more advanced extensions of the Fresh Approach fundamentals. Written Lessons are Moore's personal worksheets, taken from ideas explored in his own practice sessions. The Academy places a strong emphasis on community. Members are offered a monthly Facebook chat with Moore himself, with each month's video posted to an on-site archive. Additional interactive opportunities include a user forum, and blog. Subscribers may submit video clips of themselves playing their favorite beats. Each month, Moore selects and posts one beat with a video response of him playing his version of the same beat. There is also an associated Instructional Academy which provides lesson platforms and marketing assistance for music teachers seeking to bring their curriculum online.

== Discography ==
=== Solo albums ===
- All Kooked Out! (Fog City, 1998)
- Flyin' the Koop (Blue Thumb/Verve, 2002)
- III (Telarc, September 26, 2006)
- Emphasis! (On Parenthesis) (Telarc, April 22, 2008)
- Groove Alchemy (Telarc/Concord, April 13, 2010)
- Conversations (Royal Potato Family, April 15, 2014)
- With You In Mind (Cool Green/Mascot, July 21, 2017)

=== With Galactic ===
- Coolin' Off (Fog City, 1996)
- Crazyhorse Mongoose (Capricorn, 1999)
- Late for the Future (Capricorn, 2000)
- We Love 'Em Tonight: Live at Tipitina's (Volcano, 2001)
- Vintage Reserve (Volcano, 2003)
- Ruckus (Sanctuary, 2003)
- From the Corner to the Block (ANTI/Epitaph, 2007)
- Ya-Ka-May (ANTI/Epitaph, 2010)
- Carnivale Electricos (ANTI/Epitaph, 2012)
- Into the Deep (Provogue, 2015)

=== With Garage A Trois ===
- Mysteryfunk (Fog City, 1999)
- Emphasizer (Tone Cool, 2003)
- Outre Mer (Telarc, 2005)
- Power Patriot (Royal Potato Family, 2009)

=== With Corrosion of Conformity ===
- In the Arms of God (Sanctuary, 2005)
- Good God / Baad Man (Nuclear Blast, 2026)

=== With others ===
- Some Twigs - Oxenthrust (Oxen, 1991)
- Money Shot - Robert Walter's 20th Congress (Fog City, 2000)
- Live From New York - Bonerama (Bonerama, 2004)
- Super Heavy Organ - Robert Walter (Magna Carta, 2005)
- The Coalition of the Willing - Bobby Previte (Ropeadope, 2006)
- Blue Plate Special - Will Bernard (Palmetto, 2008)
- Street Sweeper Social Club - Street Sweeper Social Club (Warner Bros., 2009)
- The Lord Is Waiting and The Devil Is Too - Johnny Sansone (ShortStack, 2011)
- Fast Forward - Joe Jackson (Caroline, 2015)
- My Future Is My Past - Walter "Wolfman" Washington (ANTI/Epitaph, 2018)
- Book of Queens - Krasno/Moore Project (Concord Jazz, 2023)
