= Into the Deep =

Into the Deep may refer to:

- Into the Deep (album), a 2015 album by the band Galactic
- Into the Deep (2020 film), a Danish documentary about Peter Madsen and the murder of journalist Kim Wall
- Into the Deep (2022 film), a mystery thriller directed by Kate Cox
- Into the Deep (2025 film), an American action thriller
- Yakamoz S-245, a Turkish apocalyptic science fiction drama thriller TV series (working title Into the Deep)
- "Into the Deep" (Once Upon a Time), a 2012 TV series episode
- "Into the Deep" (Real Housewives of Cheshire), a 2017 TV series episode
- "Into the Deep" (Chicago P.D.), a 2022 TV series episode
- Into the Deep: America, Whaling & the World, a 2010 documentary film
- Into the Deep: A Memoir from the Man Who Found Titanic (2021) by Robert Ballard
- Into the Deep (FIRST), 2024-2025 robotics competition
