= All Kooked Out! =

Studio album by Stanton Moore
- Released: 1998-05-19
- Recorded: February 25 – March 1, 1998
- Studio: Magazine Sound Recording, New Orleans
- Genre: Jazz funk New Orleans
- Length: 62:27
- Label: Fog City
- Producer: Dan Prothero

Stanton Moore chronology
All Kooked Out! (1998)	Flyin' the Koop (2002)

Professional ratings
Review scores
Source	Rating
All About Jazz link Allmusic	3/5 stars

All Kooked Out! is the debut studio album by New Orleans–based drummer Stanton Moore.

It was recorded entirely live in the studio with no overdubs and no headphones, in a week-long session that also yielded Mysteryfunk, the debut album for Garage A Trois. Prior to this session, producer Dan Prothero worked with Moore on Galactic's first two albums.

When Prothero asked Moore of who he'd like to play on his solo debut album he thought of eight-string guitarist Charlie Hunter and saxophonist Skerik who had both previously sat in with Galactic. Moore stated getting "Charlie Hunter and Skerik together would just be insane 'cause they're both just really fun guys to hang around with... quirky... funny and just great musicians." Regarding the album's title according to Moore, Prothero stated approvingly about Hunter, Skerik and Moore, "(you're) the biggest bunch a kookers I've ever met."

Moore's line-up for his instrumental debut album also included several fellow New Orleans musicians. Ben Ellman (long-time associate from Galactic) and Brent Rose (Nightcrawlers) are on tenor saxophone. Matt Perrine (Bonerama) plays sousaphone. Also there is Michael Ray (Sun Ra) on trumpet, Craig Klein (Bonerama) on trombone and Brian Seeger on guitar. Notably, there are no keyboards on All Kooked Out!

This Enhanced CD contains bonus audio and in-studio video.

== Track listing ==
1. "Tchfunkta"
2. "Common Ground"
3. "Green Chimneys"
4. "Blues For Ben"
5. "Kooks on Parade"
6. "Nalgas"
7. "Witch Doctor"
8. "Boogaloo Boogie"
9. "Nobodys Blues"
10. "Stanton Hits The Bottle"
11. "Farmstead Antiques"
12. "Angel Nemali"
13. "Honey Island"
14. "DATA TRACK" (Enhanced CD)

== Personnel ==
- Stanton Moore – drums, percussion
- Charlie Hunter – eight string guitar
- Skerik – saxophonics, kookification
- Ben Ellman – tenor saxophone
- Matt Perrine – sousaphone
- Brent Rose – tenor and soprano saxophone
- Brian Seeger – guitar

Dan Prothero – producer, engineer, editing, mixing, graphic design, photography, programming
