= Flyin' the Koop =

Studio album by Stanton Moore
- Released: 2002
- Recorded: January 8–11, 2001 at Prairie Sun Studios, Petaluma, CA
- Genre: Jazz, funk, rock
- Length: 52:16
- Label: Blue Thumb Records, Verve Music Group
- Producer: Jason Olain, Stanton Moore, Nick Sansano

Stanton Moore chronology
| All Kooked Out! (1998) | Flyin' the Koop (2002) | III (2006) |

Professional ratings
Review scores
| Source | Rating |
|---|---|
| All About Jazz link Allmusic | 4/5 stars |

Flyin' the Koop is the second solo album by New Orleans drummer Stanton Moore. The album includes funk, rock and jazz. Moore's line-up for Flyin' the Koop is in part a combination of musicians with whom he played at a "SuperJam" at Tipitina's during Jazz Fest 2000.

Moore's concept for the album "was to have two saxes, bass and drums, and to improvise over loops..." building the tracks upon rhythm. Melodies then developed through improvisation and composition by the saxophonists. "Magnolia Triangle" is a classic New Orleans composition in 5/4 meter from famed New Orleans drummer and composer James Black. "Let's Go" and "Hunch" are both contributions from the writing team of Charlie Dennard and Brian Seeger who were half of Moore's working band at the time, "Moore and More". The track "For the Record" is a composition by Seeger written specifically for this session.

On Flyin' the Koop Moore played vintage Gretsch drums with an 18-inch bass drum. Wood plays upright and Hoffner bass. Many fans speculated at first that the name of the solo album implied that Moore could be leaving his band Galactic. Moore explained that the metaphor which regarded "freeing yourself from the limitations" of music styles was combined with the location of the recording studio being on a former chicken farm in Cotati, California.

== Musicians ==
- Stanton Moore - drums
- Karl Denson - saxophone, flute
- Skerik - saxophone
- Chris Wood - bass
- Brian Seeger - guitar

== Track listing ==
1. "Tang the Hump"
2. "Fallin' Off The Floor”
3. "Let's Go"
4. "Launcho Diablo"
5. "Prairie Sunset"
6. "Things Fall Apart"
7. "Amy's Lament"
8. "Magnolia Triangle"
9. "Hunch"
10. "Bottoms Up"
11. "For the Record"
12. "Organized Chaos"
