= Emphasis! (On Parenthesis) =

Studio album by Stanton Moore Trio
- Released: April 22, 2008
- Recorded: November 29 – December 2, 2007
- Studio: Dockside Studios, Lafayette, LA by Mike Napolitano
- Genre: Funk, jazz-funk
- Length: 46:55
- Label: Telarc
- Producer: Stanton Moore, Mike Napolitano

Stanton Moore Trio chronology
| III (2006) | Emphasis! (On Parenthesis) (2008) |

Professional ratings
Review scores
| Source | Rating |
|---|---|
| All About Jazz | 4.5/5 stars |
| allmusic | 4/5 stars |

Emphasis! (On Parenthesis) is an album by the Stanton Moore Trio, released on April 22, 2008. Organist Robert Walter and guitarist Will Bernard, both of whom played with Moore on his previous solo album, III, are featured on the album.

Notably, each track on the album features a title containing a parenthetical statement, as does the title of the album. This is Moore's response to the gentle ribbing of his Galactic bandmates that he includes brackets in almost every song he writes.

== Personnel ==
- Stanton Moore: drums
- Robert Walter: Hammond B3 organ, piano, toy piano, clavinet
- Will Bernard: guitar

== Track listing ==
1. "(Late Night at the) Maple Leaf" - 6:27
2. "(Proper) Gender" - 2:56
3. "Wissions (of Vu)" - 3:22
4. "(Sifting Through the) African Diaspora" - 5:10
5. "Over (Compensatin')" - 4:37
6. "(Smell My) Special Ingredients" - 5:39
7. "(I Have) Super Strength" - 3:48
8. "(Who Ate the) Layer Cake?" - 4:28
9. "Thanks! (Again)" - 2:57
10. "(Put On Your) Big People Shoes" - 4:08
11. "(Here Come the) Brown Police" - 3:20
