= Corey Henry =

American musician and singer

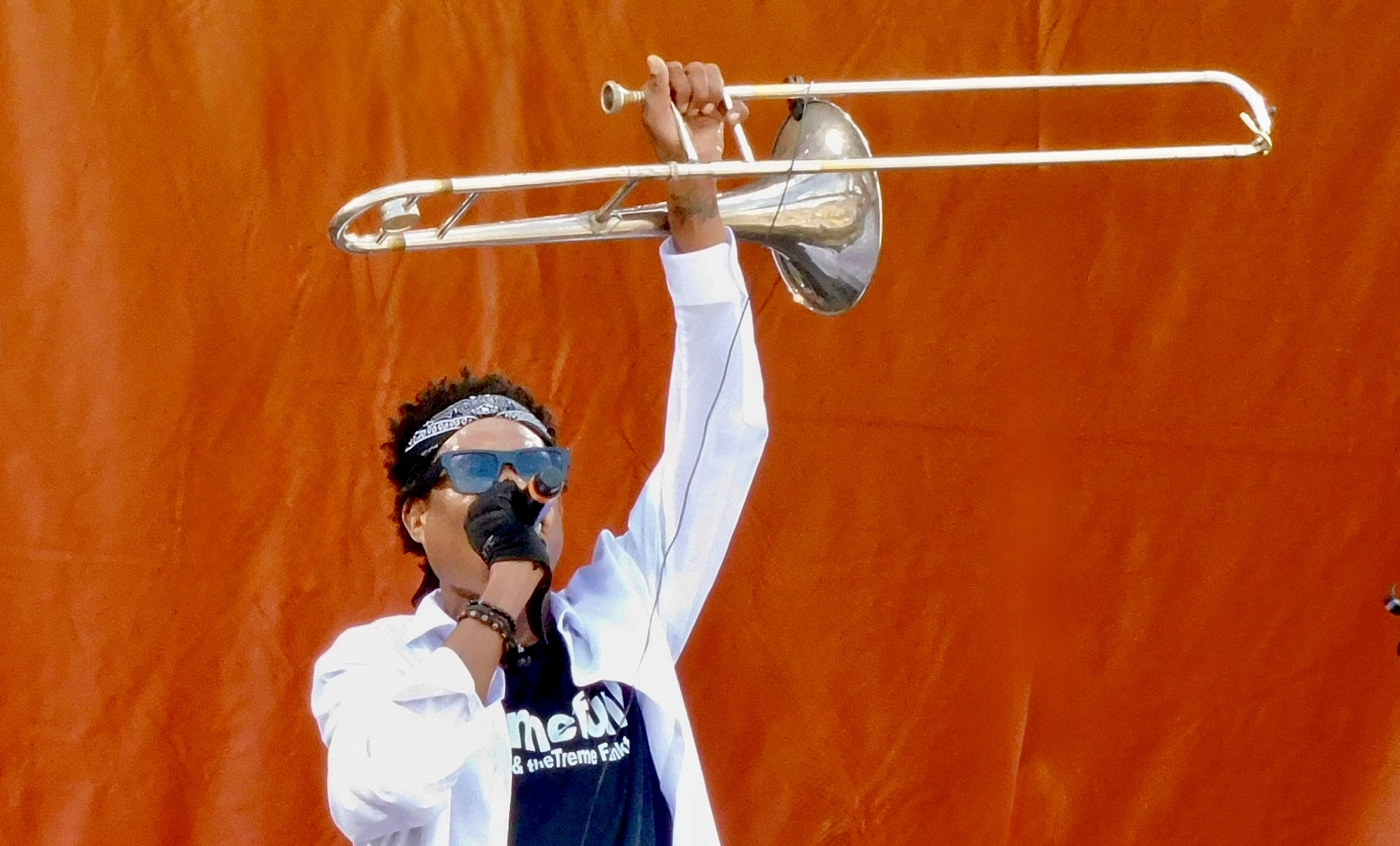
- Henry at New Orleans Jazz and Heritage Festival, 2025

Background information
- Born: July 14, 1975 (age 50); New Orleans, Louisiana
- Genres: Funk; Brass
- Occupations: Trombonist, singer-songwriter
- Instruments: Trombone; Vocals
- Years active: 1985–present
- Label: Louisiana Red Hot Records
- Website: https://www.coreyhenrytremefunktet.com/

Corey Henry is an American trombonist, composer, producer, singer and songwriter born in New Orleans, Louisiana. He was raised in the Treme neighborhood near New Orleans' historic Congo Square. Henry began playing drums as a child, but switched to trombone at age 10, learning from his family members including Uncle Benny Jones, Sr. in the Treme Brass Band.

== Musical career ==
Henry joined the Treme Brass Band at age 16, alongside his mentor Kermit Ruffins. He eventually inherited Ruffins' weekly Thursday night residence at Vaughan's Lounge in New Orleans. In the late 1990s, Henry founded the Lil Rascals Brass Band.

Henry was trombonist on Kermit Ruffins: The Barbecue Swingers Live in 1998, and Ruffins' 2001 album Swing This. He was on Widespread Panic's 1999 album 'Til the Medicine Takes.

After 2005's Hurricane Katrina, Henry joined Rebirth Brass Band, and won a 2012 Grammy in Best Regional Roots Music Album (the first year for the category) for playing on Rebirth of New Orleans album. He then joined the Tipitina's based funk-jazz band Galactic, performing on their albums The Other Side of Midnight in 2010, Ya-Ka-May in 2012, Into The Deep in 2015, and on the 2010 album and song Cineramascope with Galactic and Trombone Shorty, featured on the Now You See Me soundtrack.

Henry's album Corey Henry and the Treme Funktet: Live At Vaughn's was nominated for a 2026 Grammy Award for Best Regional Roots Music Album. He was named to Esquire magazine's Best Dressed Men at the Grammy Awards, 2026 and bandmate June Yamagishi was on GQ's Best Dressed at the Grammys.

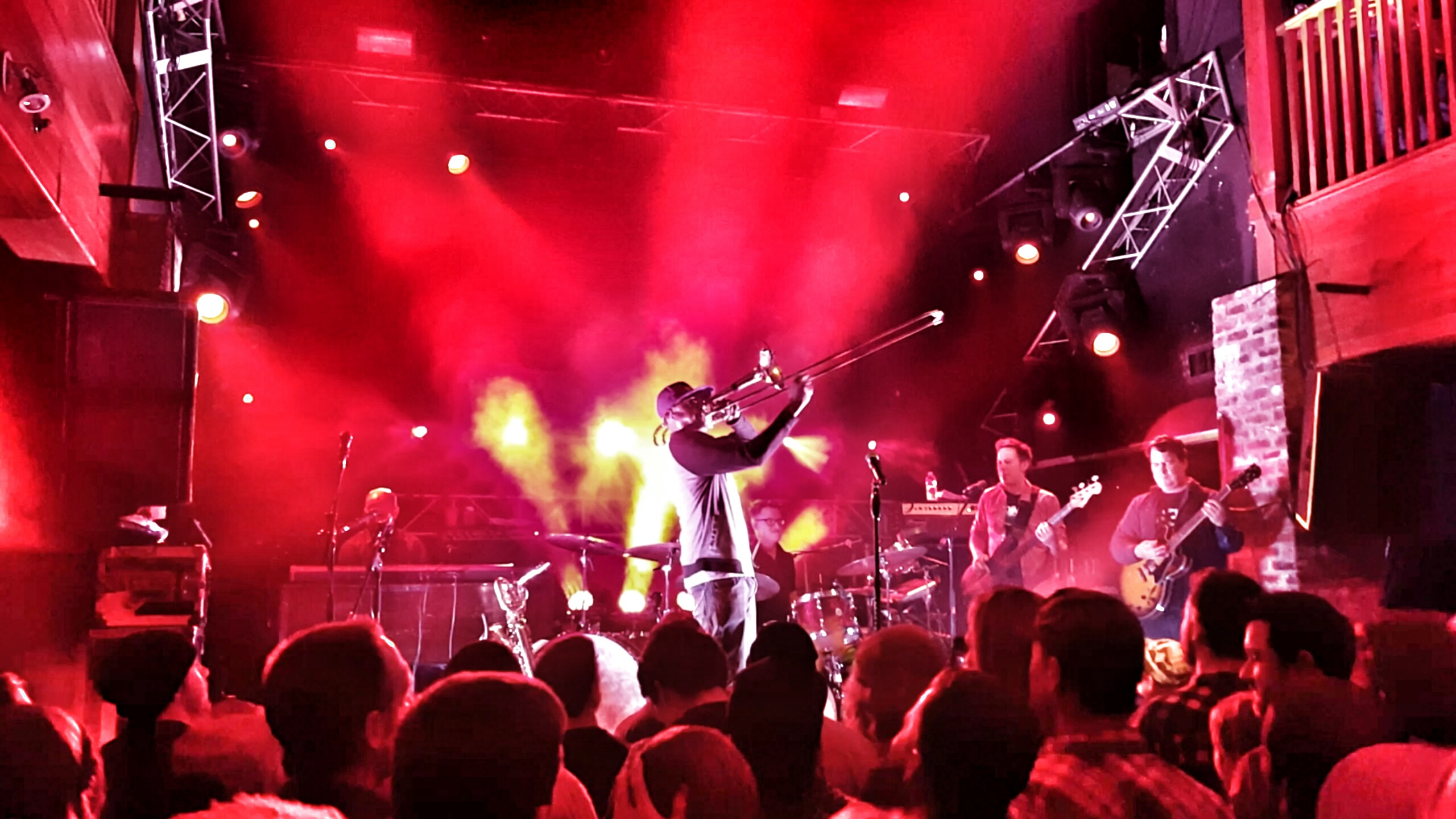
Galactic with Corey Henry, very last show, Jan. 20, 2016

== Recordings ==
In 2011, Henry formed the Treme Funktet and he released his first album Lapeitah on Louisiana Red Hot Records in 2016. Members have included guitarist June Yamagishi, Manus Tilton on bass, Walter Lundy on drums, Antonio Gambrell on trumpet, Beck Burger on keyboard, and Donald Surtain on violin.

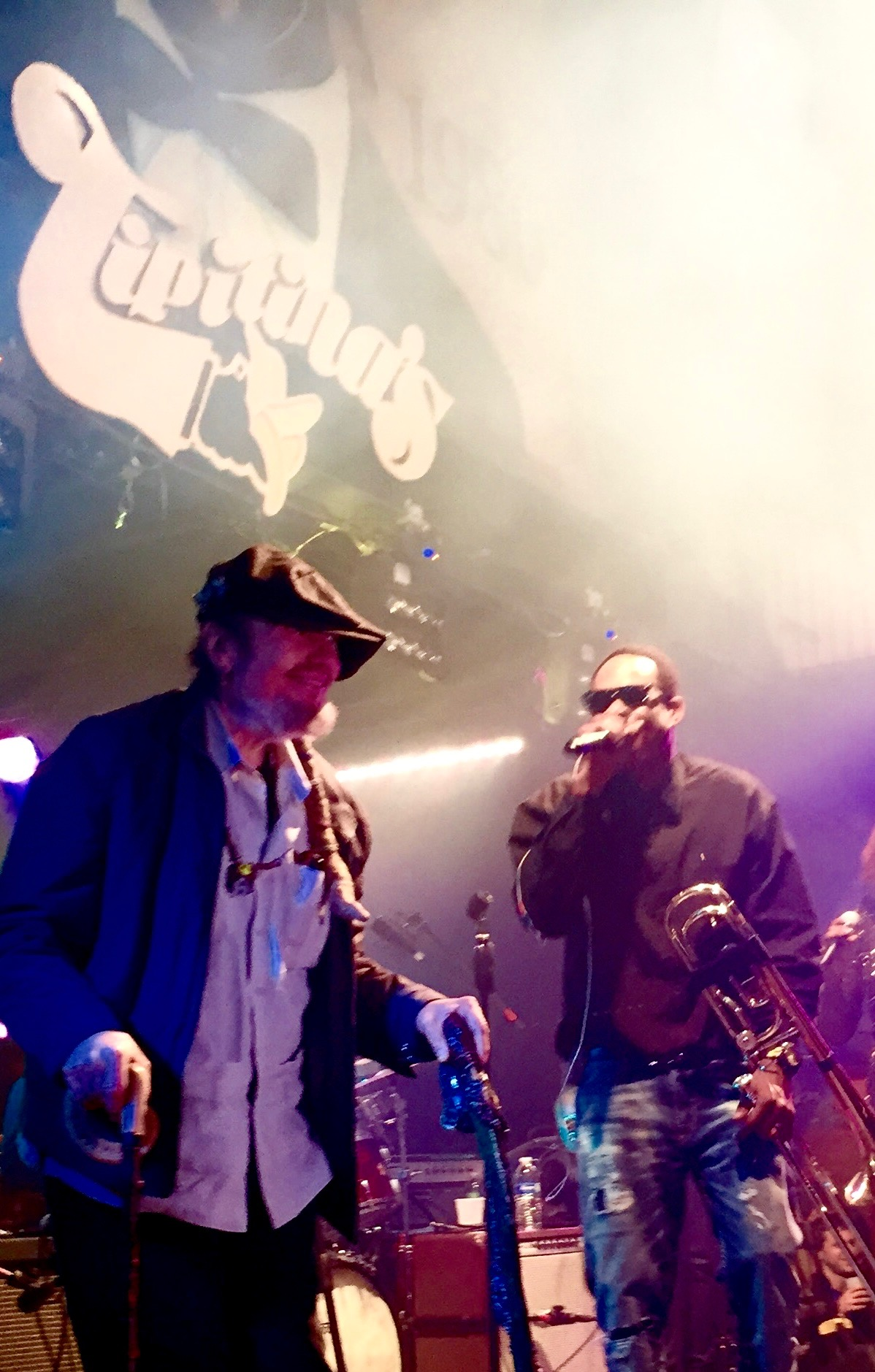
Dr. John and Corey Henry New Year's Eve 2015 Tipitinas

The band was selected by The New York Times as a standout set at the 2019 New Orleans Jazz and Heritage Festival. That year, Henry was presented with the Spirit of Satchmo Music Award at the Satchmo SummerFest, performed on NCIS: New Orleans as himself, and won Best Trombonist by OffBeat magazine.

Corey "Boe Money" Henry and the Treme Funktet were named Gambit's 2020 Big Easy Award winners for Best Funk Band, and they performed on Lil Wayne's Playoff theme for the College Football Championship.

Henry released the single "Footwork" in 2023, after founding the NOLA Footwork Music Festival] in 2021 to celebrate second line culture. The band debuted album Corey Henry and the Treme Funktet Live at Vaughan's in 2025 days before their Jazz Fest set. They followed up with a video for the single "Treme Lyfe" from the live album described as "horns blaring, guitars wailing and drums just tearing the place up."

Henry's daughter Jazz plays trumpet with the all-female brass band The Pinettes, and was a guest artist on his "NOLA Footwork" single.

In May 2026, Henry and the Treme Funktet performed at the New Orleans Jazz & Heritage Festival, the St.-Louis International Jazz Festival in Senegal, Africa, and released a new single, "My City", a New Orleans anthem, on May 22, 2026 on Louisiana Red Hot Records.

== Discography ==
=== Albums ===
- Lapeitah (2016: Louisiana Red Hot Records)
- Corey Henry and the Treme Funktet Live at Vaughan's (2025: Louisiana Red Hot Records)

=== Singles ===
- "Footwork" (2023: Louisiana Red Hot Records)
- "My City" (2026: Louisiana Red Hot records)
