= Crazyhorse Mongoose =

Studio album by Galactic
- Released: September 1, 1998
- Recorded: August 18–22, 1997
- Studio: Brilliant Studios (San Francisco, CA); Greyboy Studios (San Diego, CA)
- Genre: Jazz funk; acid jazz
- Length: 57:16
- Label: Capricorn
- Producer: Dan Prothero; Galactic

Galactic chronology
Coolin' Off (1996)	Crazyhorse Mongoose (1998)	Late for the Future (2000)

Crazyhorse Mongoose is the second studio album by American jam band Galactic. It was released on September 1, 1998, through Capricorn Records. Recording sessions took place at Brilliant Studios in San Francisco on August 18–22, 1997 and at Greyboy Studios in San Diego. Production was handled by Dan Prothero and Galactic themselves.

In the United States, the album peaked at number 38 on the Top Jazz Albums and number 24 on the Top Contemporary Jazz Albums charts.

== Critical reception ==
Professional ratings
Review scores
Source	Rating
AllMusic	4/5 stars

Scott Iwasaki of the Deseret News stated that the album "solidified the band's reputation of being a great foot-stomping groove band".

== Track listing ==
No.	Title	Writer(s)	Length
1.	"Hamp's Hump"	Paul Schwartz	3:45
2.	"Love on the Run"	Robert Mercurio; Galactic (add.)	5:45
3.	"Crazyhorse Mongoose"	Jeff Raines; Rich Vogel; Mercurio; Stanton Moore; Jason Mingledorff; Ben Ellman	4:47
4.	"Witch Doctor"	Moore; Galactic (add.)	4:13
5.	"Metermaid"	Raines; Vogel; Mercurio; Moore; Rob Gowen	1:37
6.	"Change My Ways (Pt. 1)"	Raines; Theryl DeClouet; Vogel; Mercurio; Moore	1:38
7.	"Change My Ways (Pt. 2)"	Raines; DeClouet; Vogel; Mercurio; Moore	4:22
8.	"Denny's Village Rundown"	Moore	2:30
9.	"Tighten Your Wig"	Raines; Vogel; Mercurio; Moore	3:11
10.	"Cafe Declouet"	DeClouet	0:21
11.	"Start from Scratch"	Raines; Galactic (add.)	4:12
12.	"Quiet Please"	Raines; Vogel; Mercurio; Moore	20:55
Total length:			57:16

Notes

- Track 12 contains a hidden track. "Quiet Please" lasts for 10:55 before a 4:24 period of silence.

== Personnel ==
- Theryl DeClouet — vocals
- Jeff Raines — guitar
- Rich Vogel — keyboards
- Robert Mercurio — bass
- Stanton Moore — drums
- Jason Mingledorff — alto and tenor saxophone
- Ben Ellman — baritone and tenor saxophone
- Dan Prothero — producer, recording, mixing, engineering, editing
- Justin Phelps — mixing
- Jim Andrews — engineering (tracks: 1–9, 12)
- Travis Crenshaw — engineering (tracks: 1–9, 12)
- Andreas "DJ Greyboy" Stevens — engineering (tracks: 10, 11)

== Charts ==
Chart (1999)	Peak position
US Top Jazz Albums (Billboard)	38
US Top Contemporary Jazz Albums (Billboard)	24
