= Ruckus (album) =

Studio album by Galactic
- Released: October 7, 2003
- Genre: Jazz funk, jam band, jazz fusion, New Orleans
- Label: Sanctuary
- Producer: Dan the Automator

Galactic chronology
| Vintage Reserve (2001) | Ruckus (2003) | From the Corner to the Block (2007) |

Professional ratings
Review scores
| Source | Rating |
|---|---|
| Allmusic | 4.5/5 stars |

Ruckus is the fourth studio album by the New Orleans, LA based band Galactic. It was produced by Dan the Automator. This marks the last studio album for Theryl DeClouet, leaving for health reasons.

== Track listing ==
1. "Bittersweet" – 3:29
2. "Bongo Joe" – 3:21
3. "The Moil" – 3:11
4. "Paint" – 3:19
5. "Never Called You Crazy" – 3:08
6. "Gypsy Fade" – 3:28
7. "Mercamon" – 3:12
8. "Uptown Odyssey" – 3:13
9. "Kid Kenner" – 3:25
10. "The Beast" – 2:49
11. "Tenderness" – 3:46 (General Public Cover)
12. "All Behind You Now" – 3:40
13. "Doomed" – 3:56

== Chart performance ==
=== Album ===
| Chart | Provider(s) | Peak position | Certification | Sales/ shipments |
|---|---|---|---|---|
| Billboard Top Contemporary Jazz Albums (U.S.) | Billboard | 6 | Not certified | N/A |
| Billboard Top Heatseekers (U.S.) | Billboard | 42 | Not certified | N/A |

== Personnel ==
Galactic:

Theryl DeClouet - vocals
Ben Ellman - harmonica, programming, saxophone
Robert Mercurio - bass, vocals (background)
Stanton Moore - drums, loops
Richard Vogel - keyboards
Jeffrey Raines - guitars

Teedy Boutte - vocals
Jim Greer & The Mac-O-Chee Valley Folks - guitar, keyboards
Scott Harding - engineer
Glenn Hartman - accordion
Howie Weinberg - mastering
John Lee Hardee - second engineer
