= Cindy Scott =

American jazz vocalist (born 1966)

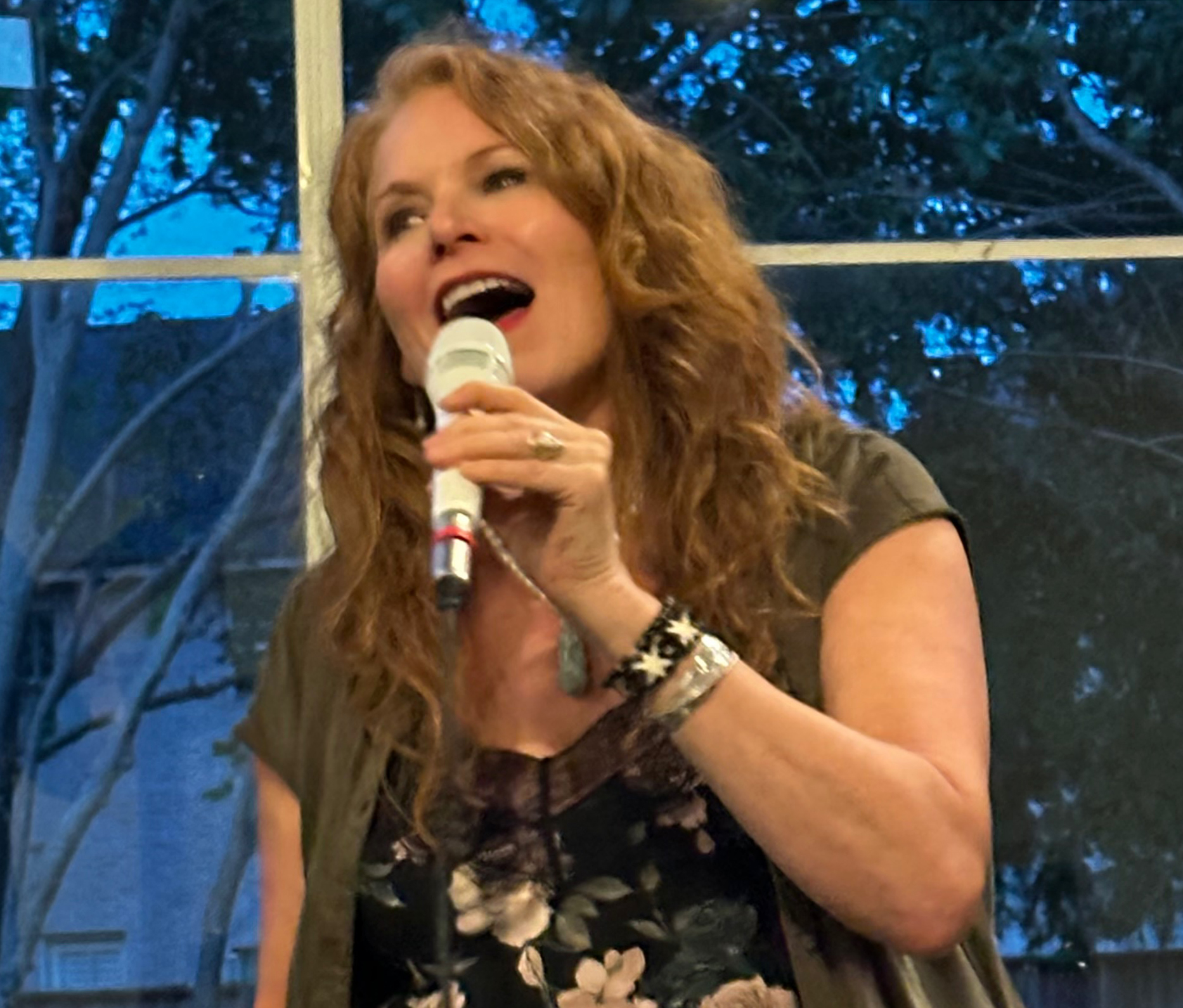
- Cindy Scott June 2024 Houston, TX

Background information
- Born: February 3, 1966 (age 60); Tupelo, Mississippi, U.S.A.
- Genres: Jazz, Singer-Songwriter
- Occupation: Musician
- Instruments: Voice, Guitar, Flute
- Years active: 2000–present
- Label: Catahoula Records
- Website: cindyscottmusic.com

Cindy Scott is an American vocalist, multi-instrumentalist, composer, producer, and educator. She has released four albums as a leader. Scott has performed in over 20 countries including Kazakhstan, Turkey, Cuba, Switzerland, Mexico, Morocco, Poland, and Spain.

== Early life and education ==
Cindy Scott was born in Tupelo, Mississippi. She comes from an extended family of musicians and educators. Her mother, Anne Presley Scott was a classically trained concert pianist, and her father, Jim Scott, played 15 instruments. They were both band directors. Scott's two sisters are musicians and educators, and her cousin, guitarist, and teacher Charlie Hall, founded the Black Rose Acoustic Society in Colorado Springs, and Colorado Roots Music Camp.

Scott was given a music scholarship by Louisiana State University and played flute and piccolo in the wind ensemble while earning a degree in German. She later earned a Masters in International Business from the University of South Carolina. She embarked on a corporate career while continuing to perform and study music. In 2002 she released her first album Major to Minor. In 2005, looking to step out of corporate life, and dedicate herself fully to her musical pursuits, she enrolled in the Jazz Studies program at the University of New Orleans.

== Music career ==
Although Scott spent many years working in the corporate world, she always had one foot in the music world as a performer, bandleader, and student of the music. She recorded her first album in Houston, TX in 2001 while still making her living as a consultant.

While earning her Master of Music in Jazz Studies from the University of New Orleans, Scott started exploring composition. Her second CD, Let the Devil Take Tomorrow featured several original pieces as well as original lyrics for the Brian Seeger composition Home Remembered, which she titled Start Again. On the back of the critical response to Let the Devil Take Tomorrow (Best of the Beat Award for Contemporary Jazz Recording), Scott organized her first tours of Europe, the US Northeast and US Midwest, as well as trips to Seattle and Istanbul.

In 2014, Scott released her third CD, Historia, which included original music and lyrics. Scott produced the CD and edited the individual tracks. The CD included several Grammy-winning and nominated artists, including Karrin Allyson. During this time, Scott was also a member of the adjunct faculty at the University of New Orleans and Loyola University New Orleans.

Scott was hired as an Associate Professor of Music at the Berklee College of Music in Boston in 2016. Beyond her teaching duties there, Scott also is the Director of Berklee's Vocal Summit. She has taught at camps and workshops around the world including the Colorado Roots Music Camp, the Seminario Internacional de Jazz del Palau de la Música in Valencia, Spain, Mining for Magic, New Orleans, and the Berklee Valencia Spain Summer Performance Program.

Scott's fourth record, Woman in the Mirror, was released in 2023. The record has a social justice theme and features several original compositions by Scott.

== Discography ==
=== As a leader ===
- Woman in the Mirror (Catahoula Records, 2023)
- Historia (Catahoula Records, 2014)
- Let the Devil Take Tomorrow (Catahoula Records, 2010)
- Major to Minor (Catahoula Records, 2002)

=== As a sideperson ===
- Denise Mangiardi, On the Brink (Alice's Loft Music, 2024)
- John Stein, No Goodbyes (Whaling City Sound, 2023)
- Roseanna Vitro, Tell Me the Truth (Skyline, 2019)
- Paul Soniat, Suddenly (Independent, 2012)
- Jacquie Sutton, Notes from the Frontier (Independent, 2012)
- John Autin, Piano Town (Rabadash Records, 2011)
- Tom McDermott, Duets (Rabadash Records, 2009)
- Jirka Hala, Make You Wanna Hala (Arta Records, 2009)

=== As a producer ===
- Cindy Scott, Historia (Catahoula Records, 2014)
- John Autin, Piano Town (Rabadash Records, 2011)

=== Compilations ===
- For Jazz Vocal Fans Only Vol. 5 (DIW Japan, 2022)
- UNO Jazz Studies Sampler (UNO Press, 2005)
- Oasis Sampler (Oasis, 2004)
