= Freddie McKay =

Jamaican singer

- Born: 1947
- Origin: Saint Catherine Parish, Jamaica
- Died: 19 November 1986 (aged 38–39)
- Genres: Reggae, Roots Reggae, Rocksteady, dub
- Instrument: Vocals
- Label: Bamboo

Freddie McKay (sometimes Freddy McKay) (1947 – 19 November 1986) was a Jamaican singer, whose career spanned the rocksteady and conscious spiritual roots reggae eras.

== Biography ==
McKay, born in Saint Catherine Parish, Jamaica, is regarded as one of the most soulful singers to come out of Jamaica. McKay first recorded for producer Prince Buster in 1967, his first hit coming the same year with "Love Is A Treasure", recorded for Duke Reid's Treasure Isle set-up. McKay then enjoyed a fruitful spell with Coxsone Dodd, recording a number of popular songs for Studio One, such as Discomix vocal and dub " Love Is A Treasure", backed by The Soul Defenders, a band that included Bobby Kalphat and Joseph Hill of Culture, including "High School Dance", "Sweet You Sour You", and "Picture on the Wall", the latter the title track of his 1971 debut album.

A second album, Lonely Man followed in 1974. McKay recorded a duet with Horace Andy in 1975, "Talking Love" which was also a hit in Jamaica. McKay enjoyed another hit in 1976 with "Dance This Ya Festival", which won the Jamaican Independence Popular Song Contest that year.

In 1977 McKay teamed up with Alvin Ranglin to produce The Best Of Freddie McKay, an album consisting entirely of new recordings despite its title. Adapting to the prevailing roots reggae conscious Rockers style, he also released several Discomix vocal and dub showcase works. These were produced, engineered and mixed by Leonard Chin, Joe Gibbs (producer), Augustus Pablo, King Tubby and Scientist.

An Ossie Hibbert-produced showcase album Creation followed in 1979, featuring McKay's versions of Burning Spear's and Johnny Clarke's Creation, a cover of Horace Andy, Coxsone Dodd, and Wentworth Vernal's The Rainbow as well as a Discomix take on Dennis Brown's Here I Come.

Another album,Tribal Inna Yard, was released in 1983, backed by Roots Radics and engineered by Scientist.

McKay maintained a faithful, serious following amongst conscious roots rockers and sound system devotees until his death in 1986 from a heart attack, shortly after finishing his final album, I'm a Free Man, cut at Joseph Hoo Kim's Channel One Studios with Sly and Robbie, Eric "Bingy Bunny" Lamont, Dean Fraser and Earl "Chinna" Smith, with backing vocals provided by The Tamlins.

His son, Andrew Chin, known under the pseudonym Brushy One String, is a musician known for playing a one-stringed guitar.

== Discography ==
=== Albums ===
- Picture On The Wall (1974 Bamboo
- Lonely Man (1974, Dragon UK / Dynamic Jamaica) (reissued 1996, Lagoon)
- Fire is Burning (1976, Amethyst Records)
- The Best Of Freddie McKay (1977, GG's)
- Creation (1979, Plant and Joe Gibbs)
- Harsh Words (1982 Gorgon)
- Tribal Inna Yard (1983, Move)
- I'm a Free Man (1988 Uptempo)
- Freddie McKay & Soul Defenders at Studio One (1991, Heartbeat)
- The Right Time Recordings (1997, GG's) (with Jah Stone)
- The Right Time (1999, Rhino)
- When You're Smiling (2002, Rhino) (Lonely Man + bonus tracks)
- Doin' It Right (2003, Charly)

=== Single ===
- Freddie McKay – "Dance Dis A Festival" – 1976 Carifest Winning Song
