= Will Bernard =

American guitarist

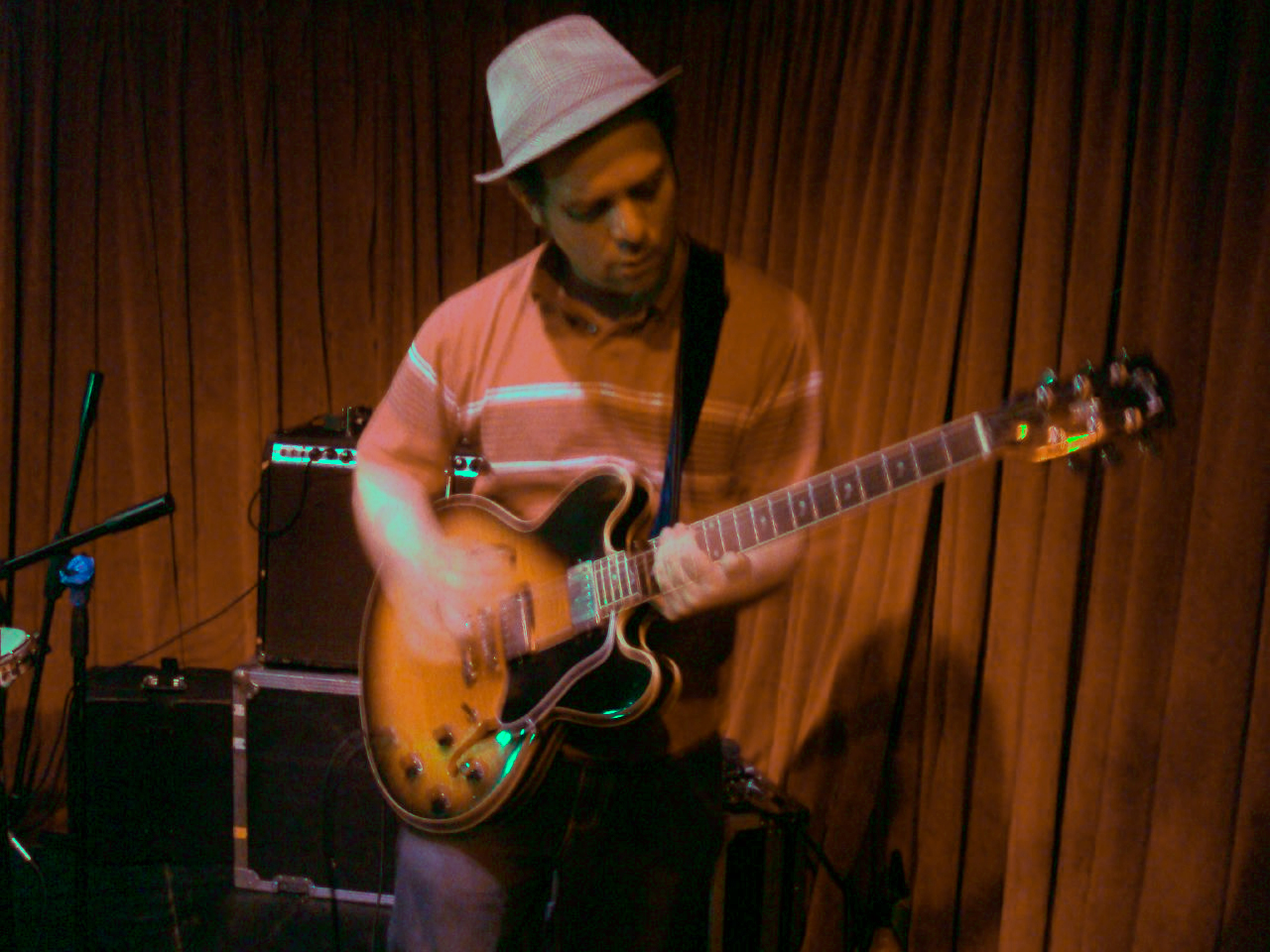
- Wiil Bernard at the d.b.a. with Stanton Moore Trio at the New Orleans Jazz & Heritage Festival, 2007

Background information
- Born: Berkeley, California, U.S.
- Genres: Jazz
- Occupation: Musician
- Instrument: Guitar
- Years active: 1990s–present
- Labels: Antilles, Palmetto, Posi-Tone
- Website: willbernard.com

Will Bernard is a guitarist and band leader. He has led the Will Bernard Band, Will Bernard Trio, Will Bernard 4-tet, and Motherbug.

== Career ==
In the 1980s Bernard was a member of the Hieroglyphics Ensemble led by Peter Apfelbaum. In the 1990s he formed the band T. J. Kirk in San Francisco with Charlie Hunter and John Schott. The band's name "James T. Kirk" was taken from James Brown, Thelonious Monk, and Rahsaan Roland Kirk. Palmetto released his debut solo album, Blue Plate Special, in 2008. He has also worked with The Coup, John Ellis, John Medeski, Stanton Moore, and Jai Uttal.

== Awards and honors ==
Grammy Award nomination, If Four Was One, 1997

== Discography ==
=== As leader ===
- Medicine Hat (Antilles, 1998)
- Motherbug (Dreck to Disk, 2000)
- Directions to My House (Dreck to Disk, 2005)
- Party Hats (Palmetto, 2007)
- Blue Plate Special (Palmetto, 2008)
- Night for Day (Bju, 2008)
- Outdoor Living (Dreck to Disk, 2012)
- Just Like Downtown (Posi-Tone, 2013)
- Out and About (Posi-Tone, 2016)
- Freelance Subversives (Ropeadope, 2020)
- Ancient Grains (Posi-Tone, 2021)
- Pond Life (Posi-Tone, 2022)

With T.J. Kirk

- T.J. Kirk (Warner Bros., 1995)
- If Four Was One (Warner Bros., 1996)
- Talking Only Makes It Worse (Ropeadope, 2003)

=== As sideman ===
With Peter Apfelbaum

- Signs of Life ([Antilles, 1991)
- Jodoji Brightness (Antilles, 1992)
- Luminous Charms (Gramavision, 1996)
- It Is Written (ACT, 2005)

With Stanton Moore

- III (Telarc, 2006)
- Emphasis! (On Parenthesis) (Telarc, 2008)
- Groove Alchemy (Telarc, 2010)

With Ben Sidran

- Don't Cry For No Hipster (Nardis, 2012)
- Picture Him Happy (Nardis, 2017)

With Jai Uttal

- Beggars and Saints (Triloka, 1994)
- Shiva Station (Triloka, 1997)

With others

- Steven Bernstein, Diaspora Suite (Tzadik, 2008)
- Anthony Brown, Rhapsodies (Water Baby, 2005)
- Don Cherry, Multikulti (A&M, 1990)
- Spearhead, Home (Capitol, 1994)
- Trance Mission, Trance Mission (City of Tribes, 1993)
- Tom Waits, Bad as Me (Anti-, 2011)
- Robert Walter, Giving Up the Ghost (Magna Carta, 2003)
