= III (Stanton Moore album) =

Studio album by Stanton Moore
- Released: 2006
- Recorded: Preservation Hall by Mike Napolitano
- Genres: Funk, Groove
- Length: 54:49
- Label: Telarc
- Producers: Stanton Moore, Mike Napolitano

Stanton Moore chronology
Flyin' the Koop (2002)	III (2006)	Emphasis! (On Parenthesis) (2008)

Professional ratings
Review scores
Source	Rating
All About Jazz link Allmusic	4/5 stars

III is Stanton Moore's third studio solo album released 2006. As each of Moore's solo albums have had unique character, III features keyboardist Robert Walter and guitarist Will Bernard for a 1970s-like soul funk with a "sense of authenticity" as "artists who live it."

It was recorded at Preservation Hall by Mike Napolitano with equipment borrowed from Ani DiFranco. It closes with songs chosen as a response to the aftermath of Hurricane Katrina.

== Personnel ==
- Stanton Moore: drums (Galactic)
- Robert Walter: Hammond B3 organ (Greyboy Allstars)
- Will Bernard: guitar (Motherbug)

== Guest artists ==
- Skerik: tenor saxophonics (Les Claypool, Critters Buggin)
- Mark Mullins: trombone (Harry Connick, Jr., Bonerama)

== Track listing ==
1. "Poison Pushy"
2. "Licorice"
3. "Big 'Uns Get the Ball Rolling"
4. "Chilcock"
5. "(Don't Be Comin' with No) Weak Sauce"
6. "Dunkin' in the Deep"
7. "Maple Plank"
8. "Water from an Ancient Well"
9. "When the Levee Breaks"
10. "I Shall Not Be Moved"
