= Party Hats =

Studio album by Will Bernard
- Released: 2007
- Recorded: San Pablo Recorders, Berkeley, California, 2006
- Genre: jazz
- Length: 58:27
- Label: Palmetto
- Producer: Will Bernard and Jon Evans

Will Bernard chronology
Directions to My House (2004)	Party Hats (2007)	Blue Plate Special (2008)

Professional ratings
Review scores
Source	Rating
Allmusic	link
Billboard	not rated link

Party Hats is a jazz studio album by Will Bernard recorded in 2006 and released in 2007. Party Hats received a Grammy Award nomination for Best Contemporary Jazz Album of 2007. The album gave Bernard more visibility as a jazz guitarist.

== Track listing ==
1. "Share the Sea" - 5:38
2. "White Elephant Sale" - 4:16
3. "Ripple Sole" - 6:37
4. "Leo's Cat" - 6:19
5. "Party Hats" - 5:05
6. "Afro Sheen" - 6:55
7. "Chin Up" - 4:57
8. "Newbie" - 4:16
9. "Folding Green" - 4:57
10. "Rattle Trap" - 4:48
11. "Penske" - 4:42

== Personnel ==
- Will Bernard - guitar
- Wil Blades - Hammond B3
- Keith McArthur - bass (1,7)
- Ryan Newman - bass (2–6, 8–11)
- Jan Jackson - drums (1, 2, 4, 5, 7, 11)
- Paul Spina - drums (3, 6, 8–10)
- Cochemea Gastelum - alto saxophone (1)
- Joe Cohen - tenor saxophone (1, 2, 5, 6, 7)
- Peter Apfelbaum - tenor saxophone, qarqabas, melodica (3, 6, 7)
- Dave Ellis - tenor saxophone (9, 10)
- Mike Olmos - trumpet (1, 6, 7)
- Adam Theis - trombone (1, 6, 7)
- Josh Jones - percussion (1, 4–7)
- Michael Bluestein - Hammond B3, electric piano (3, 7)
