= From the Corner to the Block =

Studio album by Galactic
- Released: August 21, 2007
- Genre: Jazz funk, acid jazz, jazz rap, New Orleans
- Label: ANTI-
- Producer: Count, Ben Ellman, Galactic

Galactic chronology
Ruckus (2003)	From the Corner to the Block (2007)	Ya-Ka-May (2010)

From the Corner to the Block is the fifth studio album by the New Orleans–based jazz fusion/funk group Galactic. Unlike the group's other albums, From the Corner to the Block is a collaboration with various alternative hip hop musicians. It was produced by Count, Ben Ellman and Galactic.

Professional ratings
Review scores
Source	Rating
Rolling Stone	link

== Track listing ==
1. "What You Need" – (with Lyrics Born)
2. "...And I'm Out" – (with Mr. Lif)
3. "The Corner" – (with Gift of Gab)
4. "Second and Dryades" – (with Big Chief Monk Boudreaux)
5. "Think Back" – (with Chali 2na)
6. "Bounce Baby" – (with DJ Z-Trip)
7. "Hustle Up" – (with Boots Riley)
8. "Sidewalk Stepper"
9. "From the Corner to the Block" – (with Juvenile / Soul Rebels Brass Band)
10. "Squarebiz" – (with Ladybug Mecca / Nino Moschella)
11. "Tuff Love" – (with Trombone Shorty)
12. "No Way" – (with Lateef the Truthspeaker)
13. "Fanfare"
14. "Find My Home" – (with Ohmega Watts / Vursatyl)
