= Blue Plate Special (Will Bernard album) =

Studio album by Will Bernard
- Released: 2008
- Recorded: January 22–24 by Matt Balitsaris at Maggie's Farm Studios
- Genre: Jazz
- Length: 56:09
- Label: Palmetto
- Producer: Matt Balitsaris

Will Bernard chronology
Party Hats (2007)	Blue Plate Special (2008)

Professional ratings
Review scores
Source	Rating
All About Jazz	(no rating) link
Allmusic	link

Blue Plate Special is a jazz studio album by Will Bernard recorded and released in 2008. The recording includes jazz-funk musicians Will Bernard on guitar, Stanton Moore (of Galactic) on drums, John Medeski (of Medeski, Martin and Wood) on keyboards and Andy Hess (of Gov't Mule) on bass.

== Track listing ==
1. "Baby Goats" - 5:22
2. "Magpie" - 5:19
3. "Blue Plate Special" - 5:20
4. "571" - 6:00
5. "Blister" - 6:31
6. "Gen Pop" - 5:28
7. "Awanna" - 4:05
8. "Fast Fun" - 4:19
9. "Frontwinder" - 5:25
10. "Gonzo" - 4:13
11. "How Great Thou Art" - 3:59
