= Fusebox Funk =

American hip hop group

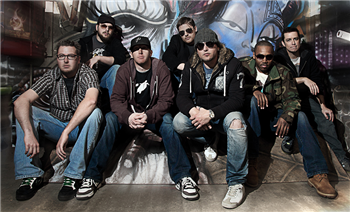

Background information
- Origin: Jacksonville, Florida
- Genres: Alternative Hip hop / Funk / Rock
- Years active: 2001 - 2016
- Members: ChrizP - Saxophone, Percussion, Vocals; J. Dash - Vocals, Synth, Keys; El Producto - Trombone, Synth, Vocals; Ladd Acree - Guitar; ByrDog - Drums; Cary The Label Guy - Bass
- Past members: Seth Kottler (Bream Busta) - Bass; Pete Booras - Drums; Dr Concussion - Guitar, Vocals
- Website: fuseboxfunk.net

Fusebox Funk was a funk/hip hop/rock group, formed in Jacksonville, Florida. Fusebox Funk was active from their debut in 2001 until late 2016.

== History ==
Originally formed in 2001 by Chris Poland, Grant Nielsen, Seth Kottler and funded by founder & ex-drummer Pete Booras, the band self-produced their own CD demos, live DVD videos and released their first CD, titled The Solution, in 2004. They also acted as their own agent and manager, booking gigs on their own until 2008.

Fusebox Funk appeared on the same bill with artists such as Galactic, Ozomatli and George Clinton, Smash Mouth, and performed with the Jacksonville Symphony Orchestra in 2006.

== Discography ==
- The Solution EP (2004)
- The Next Obsession EP (2006)
- Live and Limited (2009)
- The Subterrestrials EP (2010)
