= Brian Seeger =

New Orleans musician and academic

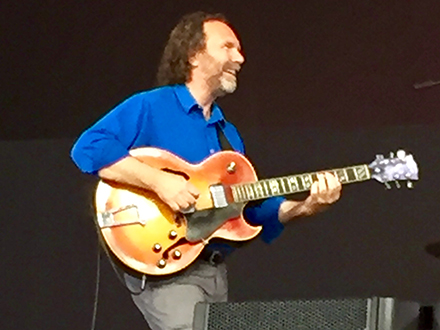
- Brian Seeger at the New Orleans Jazz & Heritage Festival, 2018 with the Organic Trio

Background information
- Born: August 27, 1960 (age 65); Mount Clemens, Michigan
- Genres: Jazz
- Occupation: Musician
- Instrument: Guitar
- Years active: 1980s–present
- Label: Jazz Family
- Website: brianseeger.com

Brian Seeger is a guitarist, composer, producer, educator, recording engineer, bandleader and forensic musicologist. He was appointed Coca-Cola Endowed Chair in American Jazz Studies at the University of New Orleans in 2023.

== Musical career ==
Seeger played his first professional gigs as a young teen in New Jersey. Before his senior year of high school, his family moved to Florida. Seeger attended Florida State University in Tallahassee, Florida. In the mid-80s, he traveled abroad for several years, performing as a street musician. Upon returning to the US in 1987, Seeger moved to Boston to complete a degree in Guitar Performance at the Berklee College of Music.

Seeger moved to New Orleans in 1991 and began performing and touring with many New Orleans artists, including Davell Crawford, Aaron Neville and Stanton Moore. Seeger was part of Moore's first solo project, Moore and More, and composed many pieces for the group. He appeared on Moore's first two solo records All Kooked Out! and Flyin' the Koop. Other bands Seeger was a part of at this time was Quintology, the New World Funk Ensemble, Neslort and Theresa Andersson.

The early 2000s found Seeger performing more as a bandleader and increasingly producing records for other artists.

Since 2010, Seeger has primarily worked with the Organic Trio, Cindy Scott and Brad Walker, producing several records for all of these artists, as well as performing and writing music for them.

== Academic career ==
Seeger is a full professor in the Music Department of the University of New Orleans and holds the Coca-Cola Endowed Chair in American Jazz Studies. He has been part of the full-time faculty at UNO since 2008. Before that, Seeger was adjunct faculty at the University of New Orleans, Loyola University New Orleans and Delgado Community College. He has taught at the Puget Sound Guitar Workshop, at numerous National Guitar Workshop sessions, and has led workshops and clinics for students around the world. Since 2019, Seeger has worked with several law firms as a forensic musicologist.

Seeger holds a Masters of Music from the University of New Orleans, a Bachelor of Music from Berklee College of Music, and a Bachelor of Arts from Stockton University.

== Discography ==
=== As a Performer ===
- Matt Booth, Sun Prints (Independent, 2024)
- Jason Mingledorff, Start It (Independent, 2023)
- Diana Herold, Tree to Tree (X Marks the Spot, 2023)
- Cindy Scott, Woman in the Mirror (Catahoula Records, 2023)
- Diana Herald, Helium (X Marks the Spot, 2020)
- Brad Walker, The Dockside Sessions (Independent, 2020)
- Jeffrey Meyer, Images (Paw Maw Music, 2020)
- Cindy Scott & Brian Seeger, Sidebar Sessions, Vol. 6 (Independent, 2020)
- Organic Trio, Saturn’s Spell (Jazz Family, 2017)
- Evan Christopher, Bayou Chant and Other Textures (STR Digital, 2016)
- Brad Walker, Quintet (Independent, 2015)
- Cindy Scott, Historia (Catahoula Records, 2014)
- Charlie Dennard, From Brazil to New Orleans (Independent, 2014)
- Organic Trio, Home Remembered (Independent, 2013)
- Camile Baudoin, Old Bayou Blues (Threadhead Records, 2011)
- Cindy Scott, Let the Devil Take Tomorrow (Catahoula Records, 2010)
- Frederick “Shep” Sheppard, Tradition - The Habari Gani Sessions (Drumparade, 2008)
- Jirka Hala, Make You Wanna Hala (ARTA, 2008)
- Stanton Moore, Flyin' the Koop (Verve Records, 2002)
- Seeger, Petersen and Marsalis, Finger to the Universe (Lakefront Digital, 2002)
- Olivier Bou, Bou-Shah-O-Ray (Olga Records, 2001)
- Chevere, Baila Mi Ritmo (Independent, 2000)
- Quintology, Blues By 5. (Independent, 2000)
- Quintology, Quintology. (Independent, 1999)
- Stanton Moore, All Kooked Out (Fog City Records, 1998)
- New World Funk Ensemble, New World Funk Ensemble. (Turnipseed Music, 1997)
- Neslort, Martian Circus Waltz (Independent, 1996)
- Theresa Andersson, Vibes (Rabadash Records, 1994)
- Neslort, Mother’s Call (Independent, 1993)

=== As a Producer ===
- Brad Walker, A Sliver of Catharsis (Independent, 2025)
- Anna Laura Quinn & Ed Barrett, Just… Quinn & Barrett (Outside In Music, 2025)
- Sonic Chambers Quartet, Kiss of the Earth (577 Records, 2025)
- Carlos Medina, El Salt del Cavall (Seda Jazz Records, 2024)
- Byron Asher, Lord, When You Send the Rain (Sinking City Records, 2024)
- Matt Booth, Sun Prints (Independent, 2024)
- Adonis Rose & the New Orleans Jazz Orchestra arrangements by Edward Petersen, The Purge (Independent, 2024)
- Brad Walker + Extended, Side by Side (Independent, 2023)
- Cindy Scott, Woman in the Mirror (Catahoula Records, 2023)
- Brad Walker, The Dockside Sessions (Independent, 2020)
- Organic Trio, Saturn’s Spell (Jazz Family, 2017)
- Brad Walker, Quintet (Independent, 2015)
- Alex Bosworth & Hank Mackie, The Night We Called it a Day (Independent, 2014)
- Alex Bosworth, Here for You (Pearl River Records, 2014)
- The Session, This is Who We Are (Independent, 2013)
- Organic Trio, Home Remembered (Independent, 2013)
- Camile Baudoin, Old Bayou Blues (Threadhead Records, 2011)
- Cindy Scott, Let the Devil Take Tomorrow (Catahoula Records, 2010)
- Jirka Hala, Make You Wanna Hala (ARTA, 2008)
- Martin Urbach, Free Will (Independent, 2008)
- The Paislies, The Paislies (Fresh Sound/New Talent, 2007)
- Olivier Bou, Bou-Shah-O-Ray (Olga Records, 2001)
- Quintology, Blues By 5 (Independent, 2000)
- Quintology, Quintology (Independent, 1999)
- Edward Petersen, The Test (Independent, 1995)
