= Brushy One String =

Jamaican reggae musician

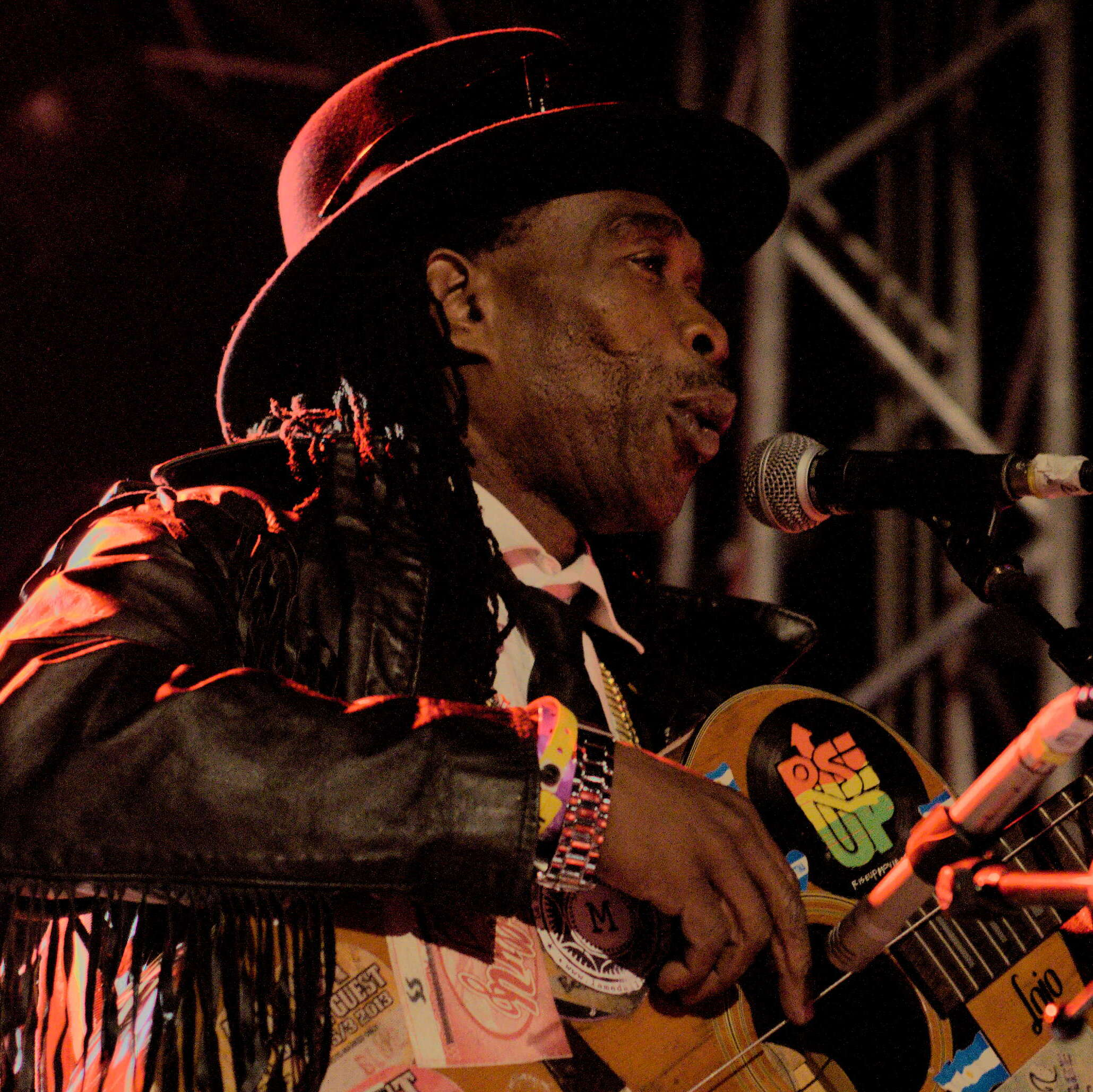
Brushy One String in 2015

Andrew Anthony Chin, better known by the stage name Brushy One String, is a Jamaican reggae singer and bassist. He performs with a guitar that only has one string. A video of him performing his hit song "Chicken in the Corn" was uploaded to YouTube in 2013; as of June 2026, it had been viewed more than 71 million times.

== Early life ==
Andrew Chin is the son of Jamaican reggae singer Freddie McKay. According to Chin, the idea of playing a guitar with a single string "came to him in a dream."

== Career ==
Chin plays an acoustic guitar with only one string while singing, also tapping with his fingers on the body of the guitar as percussion.

Luciano Blotta, who met Chin while in Jamaica shooting his 2007 documentary Rise Up, used his song "Chicken in the Corn" in the soundtrack of the movie. He later played at music festivals such as South by Southwest, New Orleans House of Blues, and New Orleans Jazz & Heritage Festival.

In 2014, The King of One String, a documentary about his musical career, was released.

In 2019, Chin and actor-comedians Lauren Lapkus, Paul F. Tompkins and Scott Aukerman played Chicken in the Corn on their podcast Threedom. The podcast promoted Brushy's Kickstarter to create a new studio album, which was fully funded.

== Discography ==
Studio albums

- Do You Really Love Me? (1996) – only released in Japan
- Destiny (2013)
- No Man Stop Me (2016)
- All You Need Is One (2019)

Live albums

- Live at New Orleans Jazz & Heritage Festival (2015)

Compilations

- The King of One String – Acoustic (2010)

== Filmography ==
- Rise Up (2007)
- The King of One String (2014)
- The Psychiatrist (2021)
