= June Yamagishi =

Japanese rock guitarist

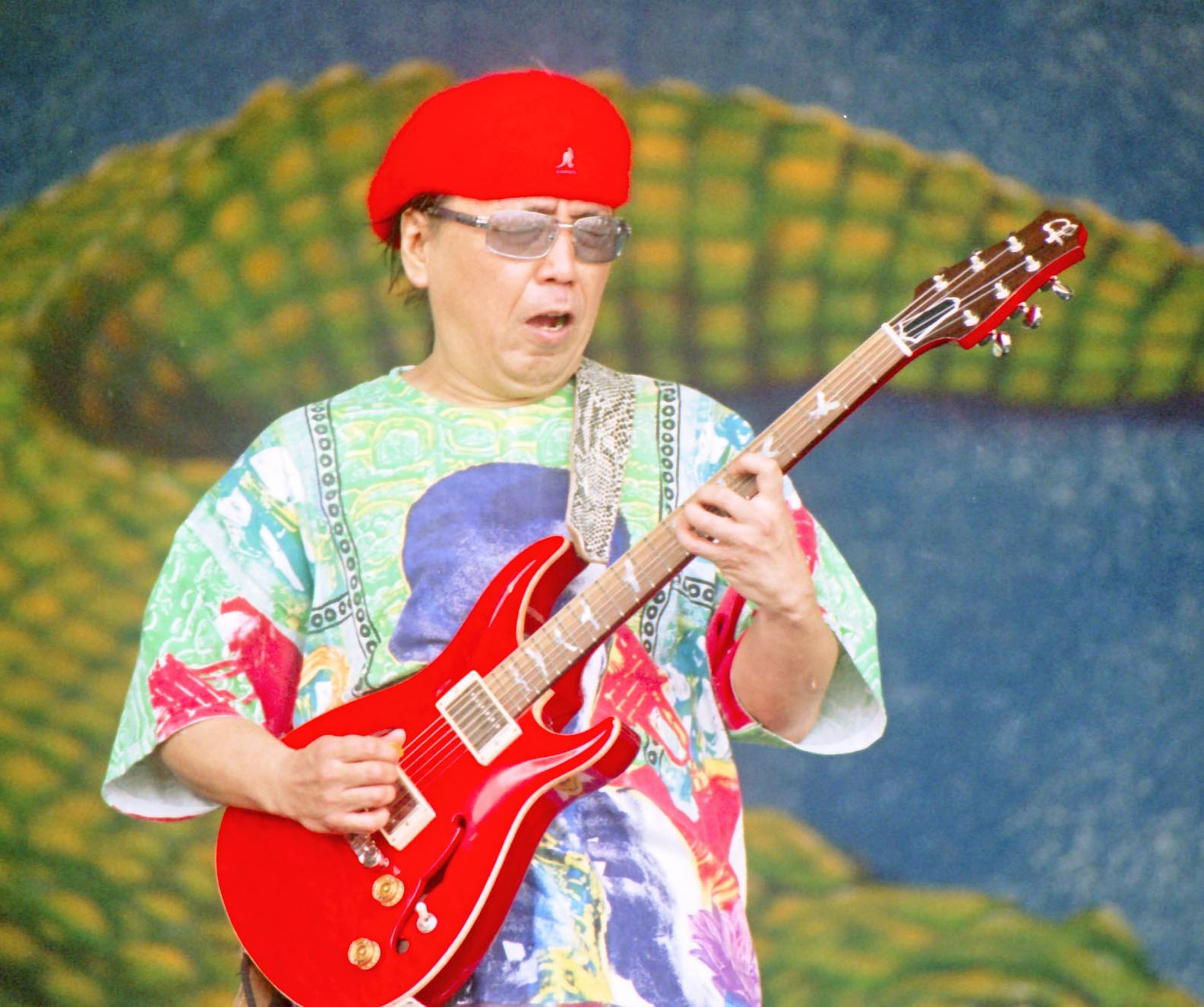
- Yamagishi at the New Orleans Jazz & Heritage Festival, 2004

Background information
- Born: Junshi Yamagishi; June 6, 1953 (age 73)
- Origin: Ise City, Mie Prefecture, Japan
- Genres: R&B, blues, jazz
- Occupation: musician
- Instrument: Guitar
- Years active: 1970-present
- Member of: Papa Grows Funk, the Wild Magnolias

June Yamagishi (山岸 潤史, born Junshi Yamagishi, June 6, 1953) is a Japanese guitarist based in New Orleans, Louisiana. He is the guitarist for bands Papa Grows Funk and the Wild Magnolias.

== History ==
Yamagishi was born in Ise City, Mie Prefecture, Japan. He has been active in the Japanese blues and jazz scene since the early 1970s. In 1972, he formed the West Road Blues Band in Kyoto along with vocalist Takashi "Hotoke" Nagai, guitarist Shinji Shiotsugu, bassist Tadashi Kobori, and drummer Teruo Matsumoto. The band soon became one of the main acts in then thriving blues scene in the Kansai region.

In 1975, Yamagishi left the West Road Blues Band to join a soul band named the Sooo Baad Revue, and in 1979, he released the first album under his name titled Really?!.

During the 1980s, he played with bands Myx and Chickenshack (a Japanese band different from the British Chicken Shack) and in the 1990s, he formed the Band of Pleasure with guitarist David T. Walker and drummer James Gadson and released three albums before they disbanded.

In 1995, Yamagishi left his well-established career behind in Japan to live in New Orleans where he still lives today. Since moving to New Orleans, he has played with musicians including Earl King, Henry Butler, Davell Crawford, Marva Wright, George Porter Jr. among many others aside from the two groups he has been a member of.

In 2007, he reunited with West Road Blues Band guitarist Shinji Shiotsugu to record Together Again - Blues in New Orleans. It was an all blues album recorded in New Orleans, with support from the local musicians including John Gros and Marva Wright.

Yamagishi appeared as himself in two episodes of the HBO series Treme. In the episode titled "Santa Claus, Do You Ever Get The Blues" (season 2, episode 4, 2011) he auditioned for the band The Soul Apostles, and after playing the songs "Fire on The Bayou" and "Love and Happiness" he was successfully employed. He also appeared in the episode titled "Tipitina" (season 3, episode 10, 2012).

On June 7, 2012, he played the Melting Point in Athens, Georgia, along with Martha Reeves, Randall Bramblett, and a host of other musicians celebrating the 60th birthday of Ike Stubblefield.

In February 2018, Funk on Da Table, Yamagishi's new band consisting of Japanese and American musicians made a tour debut. They released their first CD Live at Tipitina's the following year. Other members of the group were KenKen (bass), John "Papa" Gros (keyboards) and Nikki Glaspie (drums).

In 2023, Yamagishi teamed up with KenKen (bass), Mari Kaneko (vocals), Satoko (drums), and Taku (guitar) to form the new unit Generations On Da Table.

Yamagishi recorded a new blues album "... still in love with the Blues" with veteran vocalist and former West Road Blues Band bandmate Takashi "Hotoke" Nagai and released it on P-Vine Records in October, 2024. Masaki Ueda appeared as a guest on two tracks.

Yamagishi is one of the nine winners of the 2025 Fessy Awards, the awards named in honor of Professor Longhair, and awarded to those who made significant contributions to preserving and promoting the New Orleans music.

Yamagishi played on Corey Henry and the Treme Funktet's recording Live At Vaughn's which was nominated for a 2026 Grammy Award for Best Regional Roots Music Album. He was named to GQ's list of "The 15 Best-Dressed Men at the Grammys 2026, Ranked."

== Discography ==
=== Solo ===
- 1979: Really?! (Flying Dog)
- 1981: All the Same (Invitation)
- 1988: Give This Love (Try M)
- 1993: Jack of the Blues (BMG Victor)
- 1994: Smokin' Hole (BMG Victor)
- 2007: Together Again - Blues in New Orleans (Victor Entertainment), with Shinji Shiotsugu
- 2024: ... still in love with the Blues (P-Vine), with Takashi "Hotoke" Nagai

=== West Road Blues Band ===
- 1973: Live In Magazine No.1/2 (Chu Chu Record)
- 1975: Blues Power (Bourbon)
- 1975: Live in Kyoto (Bourbon)
- 1984: Junction (Invitation)
- 1995: Live in New York (Zain)

=== Sooo Baad Revue ===
- 1976: Sooo Baad Revue (Nippon Phonogram)
- 1977: Live (Nippon Phonogram)

=== Chickenshack ===
- 1986: Chickenshack I (Meldac)
- 1986: Chickenshack II (Meldac)
- 1986: Urban Square (original soundtrack) (Meldac)
- 1987: Loving Power (Meldac)
- 1987: Chickenshack III (Meldac)
- 1988: Chickenshack IV (Meldac)
- 1989: Chickenshack V (Meldac)
- 1990: Loving Power II (Meldac)
- 1990: Chickenshack VI (Meldac)

=== Band of Pleasure ===
- 1992: Live at Kirin Plaza
- 1994: Band of Pleasure
- 1995: A Tiny Step

=== The Wild Magnolias ===
- 1996: 1313 Hoodoo Street (AIM)
- 1999: Life Is a Carnival (Metro Blue)
- 2002: 30 Years & Still Wild (AIM)

=== Papa Grows Funk ===
- 2001: Doin It'
- 2003: Shakin'
- 2006: Live at the Leaf
- 2007: Mr. Patterson's Hat
- 2012: Needle in the Groove

=== Funk On Da Table ===
- 2019 Live At Tipitina's (Vivid Sound)

=== Corey Henry and The Treme Funktet ===
- 2025: Live At Vaughn's (Louisiana Red Hot Records)
