= The Soul Rebels =

New Orleans-based brass ensemble

- Lineup of the Soul Rebels Brass Band in 2012

Background information
- Origin: New Orleans
- Genres: Soul, jazz, funk, hip-hop, rock, pop
- Labels: Mardi Gras, Tuf America, Barn Burner, Rounder, Artistry
- Members: Lumar LeBlanc; Derrick Moss; Julian Gosin; Marcus Hubbard; Corey Peyton; Paul Robertson; Erion Williams; Manuel Perkins Jr.
- Website: thesoulrebels.com

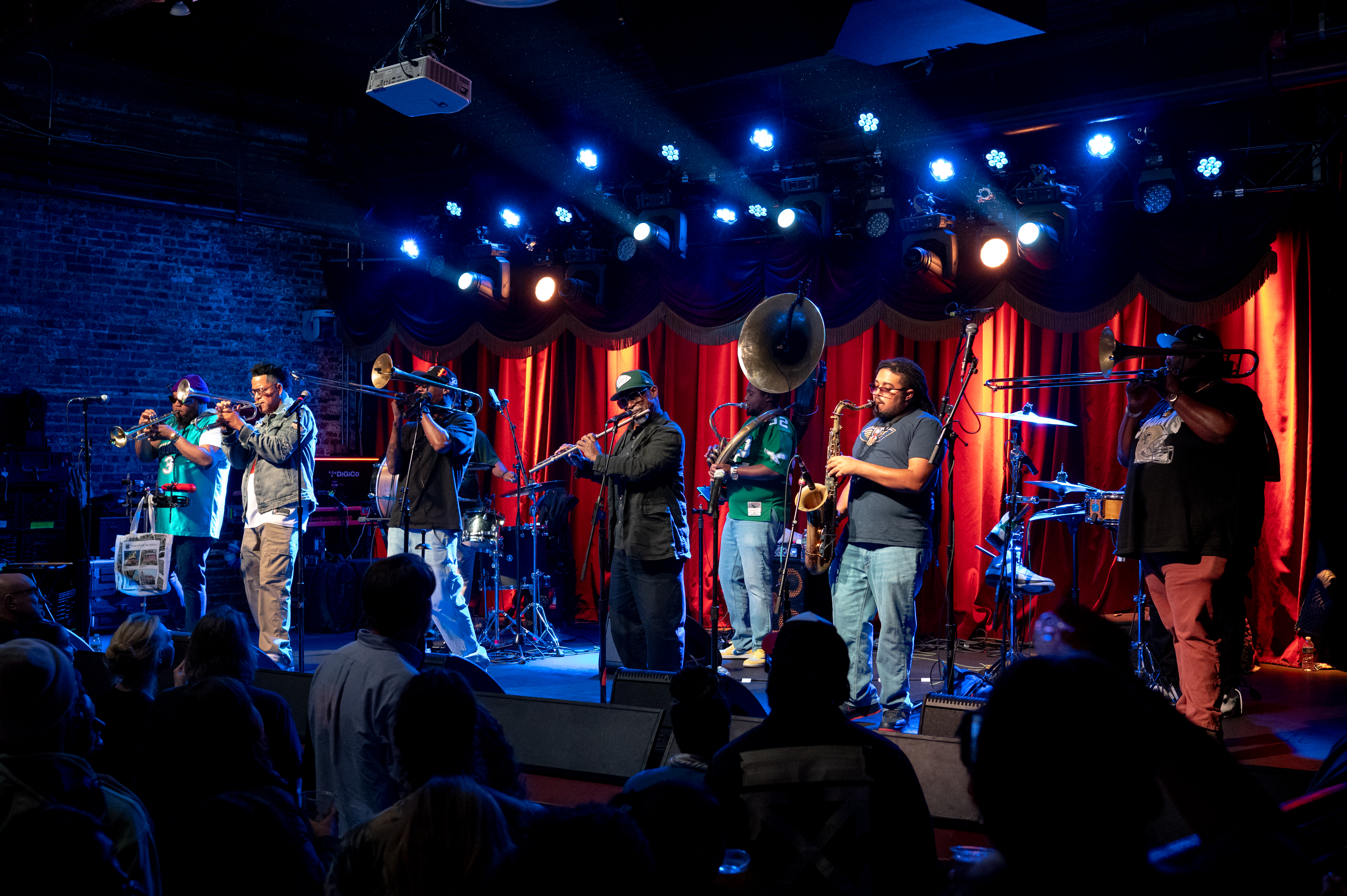
The Soul Rebels in 2026

The Soul Rebels (also Soul Rebels Brass Band, Soul Rebels or The Rebels) are an eight-piece New Orleans-based brass ensemble that incorporate elements of soul, jazz, funk, hip-hop, rock and pop music within a contemporary brass band framework.

Starting out as a local New Orleans band, The Soul Rebels have evolved into collaborating live with major artists in all worlds of music including Katy Perry, Nas, Metallica, Green Day, Macklemore & Ryan Lewis, Rakim, Marilyn Manson, Slick Rick, Joey Badass, Trombone Shorty, Talib Kweli, Pharoahe Monch, Robert Glasper, GZA, Raekwon, Black Thought of The Roots, Prodigy (rapper), Currensy, Mobb Deep, Big Freedia, The String Cheese Incident, Melle Mel, Styles P of The Lox, Umphrey's McGee, Pete Rock, Maceo Parker, Galactic, Suzanne Vega, David A. Stewart of the Eurythmics, Eric Krasno, Lettuce (band), Gov't Mule, Branford Marsalis, Smif-n-Wessun, Buckshot (rapper), Roy Hargrove, John Medeski and many others, as well as being billed on concerts with Lauryn Hill, Kanye West, Bruno Mars, Snoop Dogg, Alabama Shakes, Estelle, Cee Lo Green, The Allman Brothers Band, Arcade Fire, Disclosure, Ice Cube, George Clinton, John Mayer, Jack White and others.

The band has built its career around an eclectic live show that harnesses the power of horns and percussion in a funky party-like atmosphere. The Soul Rebels have performed on CBS, Travel Channel, Discovery Channel, HBO, TBS, NBC, NPR, ESPN, BBC Two, The CW and in major movies, and on national and international stages. The band routinely plays more than 250 shows a year. They have been described by the Village Voice as "the missing link between Public Enemy and Louis Armstrong. "

The Soul Rebels consist of percussionists and founding members Lumar LeBlanc and Derrick Moss, trumpet players Julian Gosin and Marcus Hubbard, trombonists Corey Peyton and Paul Robertson, saxophonist Erion Williams, and sousaphonist Manuel Perkins Jr.

== Early history ==
The band first began when percussionists Derrick Moss and Lumar LeBlanc met as members of Harold Dejan's Young Olympia Brass Band and decided they wanted to play the music they were hearing on pop radio, but within the context and with respect to the long tradition of the New Orleans brass bands and marching bands they had grown up playing in. The Soul Rebels played around New Orleans without a proper band name until opening up for Cyril Neville at the legendary New Orleans venue Tipitina's, where Cyril Neville dubbed them "Soul Rebels." The Soul Rebels built up their following in hometown New Orleans as the house band every Thursday night at local favorite bar Le Bon Temps Roule, a residency they still continue currently when the band isn't on tour. The band is still considered a main drawing point for people to come experience the venue.

Since 2009, The Soul Rebels have been managed by music industry heavyweight Ted Kurland, proprietor of the prestigious booking and management agency Ted Kurland Associates, Adam Shipley, president of Hep Cat Entertainment and Alex Kurland of the Blue Note Entertainment Group.

== Collaborations and milestones ==
The Soul Rebels playing with Metallica at the Fillmore West in December 2011

When Green Day performed at the New Orleans Arena in 2009, lead singer Billie Joe Armstrong invited The Soul Rebels to perform with them. In December 2011 in San Francisco at a post-Metallica anniversary after party (The Soul Rebels had performed with Metallica that evening) at the Boom Boom Room, The Soul Rebels jammed once again with Green Day's lead singer Billie Joe Armstrong.

In December 2011, The Soul Rebels appeared and performed "Sweet Dreams (Are Made of This)" on the BBC Two's Later with Jools Holland on the same episode as Metallica and Lou Reed. Metallica was so impressed with the Soul Rebels that they invited them to open and share the stage for all four of their 30th anniversary-week concerts at The Fillmore in San Francisco. Metallica remain supporters of The Soul Rebels and featured them at both nights of their first Metallica Orion Music + More Festival in June 2012. The Soul Rebels are the only band to have played both nights.

On March 10, 2012, The Soul Rebels shared the stage with Kanye West, Snoop Dogg and Seal at Brad Pitt's Night to Make It Right Foundation New Orleans after-party, hosted by comedian Aziz Ansari. The charity event, hosted by Ellen DeGeneres, raised money to build homes for victims of Hurricane Katrina.

Stella McCartney invited The Soul Rebels to perform at her 2013 spring fashion presentation hosted at the New York Marble Cemetery in New York City on June 11, 2012. Other special guests invited to the very private and exclusive party included Anne Hathaway, Jim Carrey, Anna Wintour, Annie Leibovitz, Lauren Hutton, Amy Poehler and Solange Knowles.

The Soul Rebels collaborated with Slick Rick and Rare Essence during a Tribute to Chuck Brown on June 21, 2012 in Washington DC at the historic Howard Theatre.

On October 19, 2012, The Soul Rebels hosted a CMJ showcase at the Highline Ballroom in New York City billed as The Soul Rebels & Friends ft. Maceo Parker, Moon Hooch, American Royalty and Billy Martin of Medeski Martin & Wood.

On August 15, 2014 Joey Bada$$ and Prodigy (rapper) of Mobb Deep among others, made appearances and performed with The Soul Rebels in New York City at the Brooklyn Bowl venue. The collaboration between Joey Badass and The Soul Rebels has been presented at clubs and festivals in New Orleans and New York, and was documented on Badass's debut studio album B4.DA.$$ released on January 20, 2015 by Cinematic Music Group.

The Soul Rebels collaborated live at the 2014 New Orleans Jazz & Heritage Festival with Big Freedia and The String Cheese Incident.

Rap pioneer Rakim is a frequent collaborator with The Soul Rebels' when the band performs in New York City. Rakim and The Soul Rebels performed together on February 27, 2015, at the Brooklyn Bowl, New York, June 26, 2015, at the Blue Note Jazz Club in New York and on February 27, 2016, at the Brooklyn Bowl. with hip-hop icon Talib Kweli joining the performance.

On August 15, 2015, The Soul Rebels made their Japanese debut with live surprise special guest performances with Marilyn Manson and Macklemore & Ryan Lewis at the Summer Sonic Tokyo Festival. The unannounced collaborations occurred one day prior to The Soul Rebels' headlining performance at the festival.

The Soul Rebels featuring Talib Kweli and GZA of Wu-Tang Clan headlined Electric Forest Festival on June 24, 2016. The performance marked the debut performance between The Soul Rebels and GZA.

Nas and The Soul Rebels debuted their collaboration with a headlining slot at the Brooklyn Hip Hop Festival in Brooklyn, New York, on July 16, 2016.

The Soul Rebels have shared the stage with notable artists from many corners of the pop, hip-hop and jazz worlds, including Arcade Fire, Cee Lo Green, The Roots, Metallica, Green Day, Kanye West, Snoop Dogg, Seal, Juvenile, Slick Rick, Alabama Shakes, Maceo Parker, Irma Thomas, Roy Hargrove, Bootsy Collins, Suzanne Vega, Robert Plant & Jimmy Page, Counting Crows, Drive By Truckers, Lance Herbstrong, Trombone Shorty, Allen Toussaint, David A. Stewart, Chuck Brown, Terence Blanchard, The Gap Band, George Clinton, Dr. John, Galactic, Better than Ezra, Marco Benevento, Corey Glover of Living Colour, Rare Essence, Leo Nocentelli of The Meters, Billy Martin of Medeski Martin & Wood, Moon Hooch, Joey Bada$$ and many others.

== Live performances ==
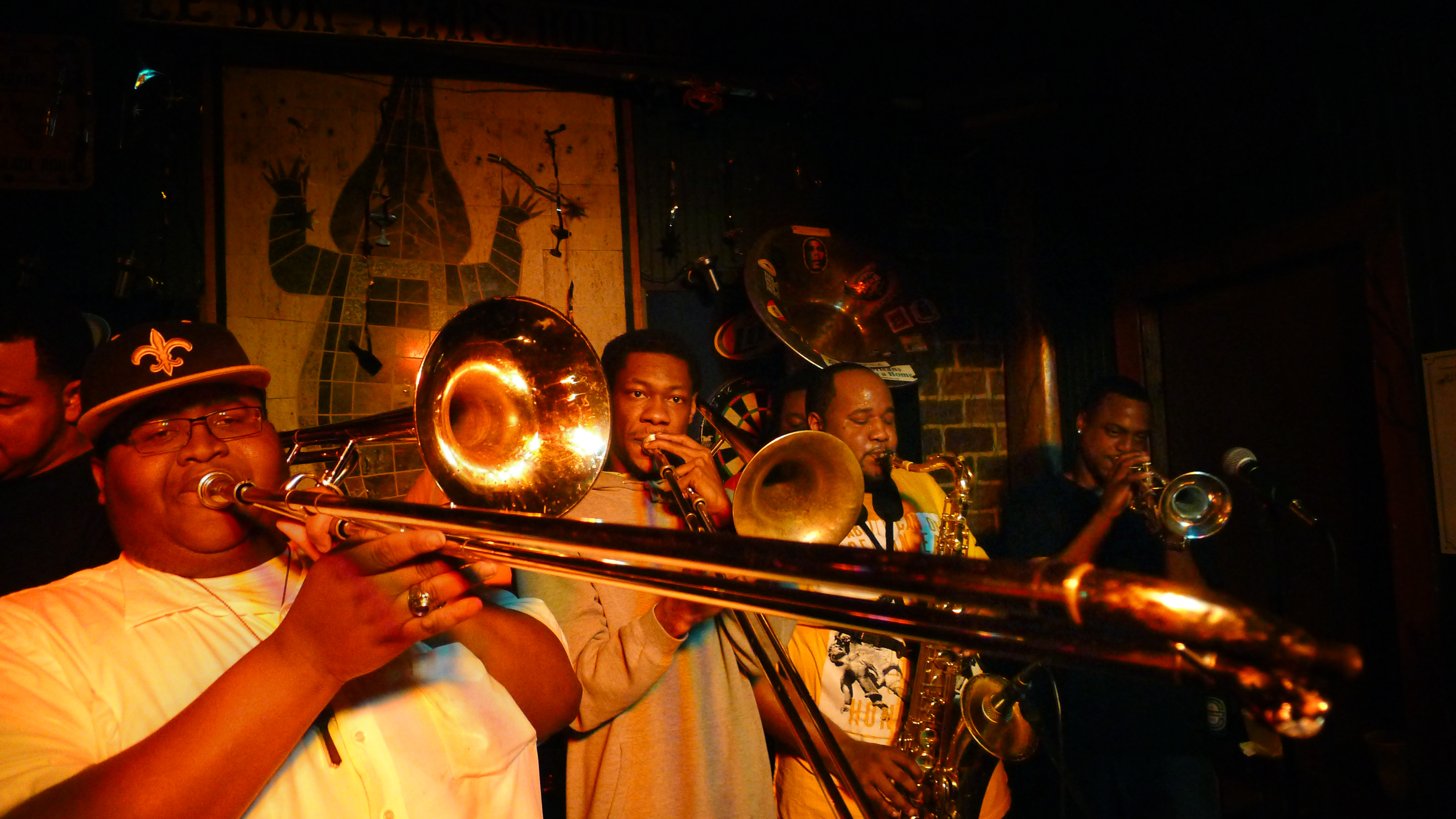
When not on tour, the band's weekly gig at Le Bon Temps Roulé in Uptown New Orleans is a favorite local event

The Soul Rebels have toured extensively around the United States, Canada, Europe, South Africa and Brazil and have played at music festivals worldwide, including in front of 50,000 people at the 2011 Montreal Jazz Festival.

The Soul Rebels toured North America in 2012 with funk band Galactic and Corey Glover of Living Colour and on March 29, 2012, appeared on the Conan O'Brien show on TBS with their tour mates.

The band has played on stages and festivals all over the world including stops at Outside Lands Music and Arts Festival, Austin City Limits, Bonnaroo, Electric Forest Festival, The Fillmore, Hollywood Bowl, Brooklyn Bowl, Terminal 5 (venue), Jam Cruise, Umbria Jazz Festival, WOMAD Festival World of Music, Arts and Dance, Antibes Jazz Festival, the Wanee Festival, New Orleans Jazz and Heritage Festival, Playboy Jazz Festival, Montreal Jazz Festival and many others.

When not on tour, the Soul Rebels maintain a weekly residence at the legendary New Orleans club Le Bon Temps Roule on Thursday nights.

== Television and film appearances ==
In 2014, The Soul Rebels appeared in The Originals on The CW network.

On May 12, 2013, The Soul Rebels were featured on The Andrew Marr Show on BBC One. They performed Michael Jackson's "Off the Wall".

On February 22, 2013, The Soul Rebels were the official house band for the Annual NFL Honors Award show on CBS prime time, hosted by Alec Baldwin. The NFL Honors is a two-hour prime-time awards show presented by the National Football League to salute the best players and plays from the 2012 NFL season. The event was held at the Mahalia Jackson Theater in New Orleans, Louisiana.

On March 29, 2012, The Soul Rebels appeared on Conan on TBS with tour mates Galactic and Corey Glover of Living Colour.

In December 2011, The Soul Rebels appeared on the BBC Two's Later with Jools Holland on the same episode as Metallica and Lou Reed.

HBO's original series Treme featured The Soul Rebels performing "Drink A Little Poison (4 U Die)" on the season one finale episode and in season 4 episode two with Galactic and Corey Glover of Living Colour performing "Hey Na Na".

On October 7, 2012, The Soul Rebels had a featured performance on NBC Sunday Night Football, performing the show's theme song.

The band performed a New Orleans style Jazz funeral for the late Captain Phil Harris from Discovery Channel's show The Deadliest Catch.

On February 24, 2012, The Soul Rebels were the subject of an NPR national broadcast of their show with Galactic live from Washington DC's 9:30 Club. The broadcast was syndicated on NPR and through other affiliates across the United States as well as webcast on NPR.org.

The band was interviewed and their music was featured in an ESPN video feature on LSU cornerback Tyrann Mathieu entitled Tyrann Mathieu Plays Jazz.

The Soul Rebels were filmed in a scene for the Nicolas Cage movie The Hungry Rabbit Jumps.

The band appeared in an episode of Travel Channel's Booze Traveler, in February 2015, entitled "Dead in New Orleans".

The band also appeared on the June 13, 2017 edition of SmackDown Live, performing a rendition of "New Day, New Way" for the New Day. The show was taped and aired live from New Orleans, the band's hometown.

In 2023, the band performed "His Soul Left Gloss on the Rose" on the soundtrack of the 2023 film Haunted Mansion.

== Power = Power mixtape (2013) ==
On December 3, 2013, The Soul Rebels released their Power = Power free mixtape. The free download featured studio, live versions and remixes of original material as well as covers of modern-day hits by such superstars as Jay-Z, Daft Punk, Kanye West, Drake, Nicki Minaj and Bruno Mars. The single on the mixtape was a remix of Daft Punk's "Get Lucky" featuring Queen of Bounce, Big Freedia. The mixtape won Offbeat's 2013 Best Of The Beat Award for Best Hip-Hop Album/Mixtape.

"Hearing hip-hop and pop records transposed on live instruments is always a pleasure for avid music fans, and The Soul Rebels are giving the people exactly that on their new Power = Power mixtape." - Jay-Z's Life+Times.

"The Soul Rebels, New Orleans' finest brass ensemble, just dropped their latest mixtape, Power = Power, which Noisey is happy to premiere...This isn't your standard wave, but the group's music is a funky new way to look some classic hits." -Vice/Noisey

"Brace yourselves folks, these men are quickly solidifying themselves amongst NOLA's proud big brass elite... and seem intent to sublimate the homogenous tones of the contemporary urban music landscape with the lush instrumentation of our culture's root." - Okayplayer

"The Soul Rebels are rebelling against one, albeit detestable thing: starchy paint-by-numbers music. As the New Orleans collective gears up to release their eclectic Power = Power mixtape on December 3 as a free download, the eight-member band has dropped a few aural treats along the way...Somewhere between Cypress Hill, Brand Nubian and Miles Davis, The Soul Rebels are filling the gaps. Power = Power features studio recordings, live versions and remixes of original works, making for a colorful musical mishmash, in which a hint of NOLA brass flair can always be found." -Vibe (magazine)

== Unlock Your Mind ==
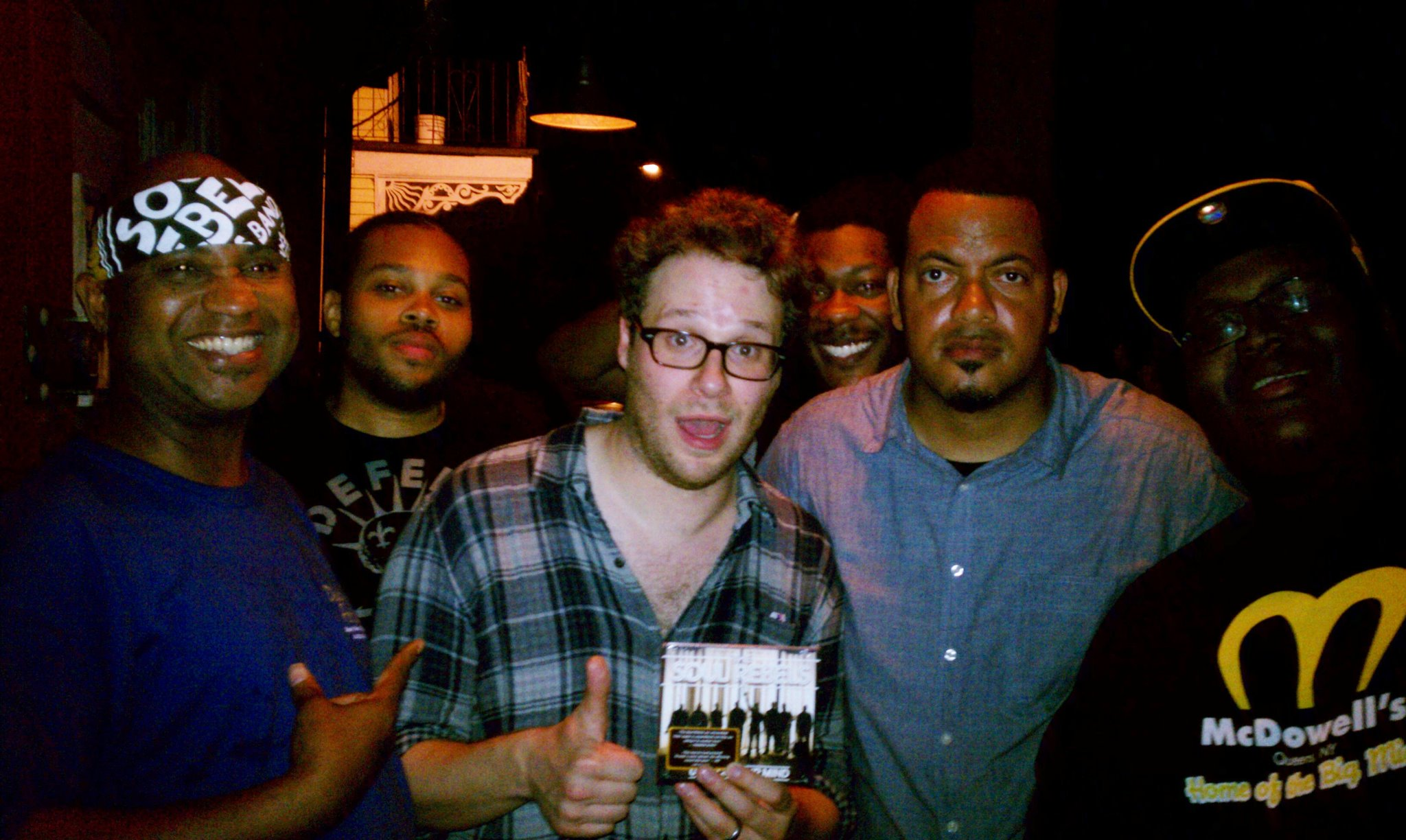
Actor Seth Rogen holding up a copy of the "Unlock Your Mind" CD and hanging out with The Soul Rebels at Le Bon Temps Roule in 2012

The band released several albums under various independent record labels before signing with Rounder Records (Concord) in 2011. The band released their full length Rounder debut, Unlock Your Mind on January 31, 2012, produced by Scott Billington. The album features special guests Trombone Shorty, Cyril Neville, Ben Ellman of Galactic and others. Unlock Your Mind was received to universally positive reviews. Elias Leight from Popmatters praised the album as "a testimony to the power of horns--in all their squawking, tooting, screaming glory--and a vibrant concoction of different types of music." Daryl Easlea from BBC Music said in support: "This is a full-on, joyous, positive album that makes you feel like celebrating."

The album reached No. 5 on iTunes Jazz charts and was the No. 1 most added album on CMJ magazine's Hip-Hop playlists.

== Critical reception ==
The Soul Rebels have been described by Village Voice as "the missing link between Public Enemy and Louis Armstrong."

Paste ranked The Soul Rebels in the Top 10 Best Moments of Bonnaroo 2012. Other bands in the top-10 ranking included Phish, Red Hot Chili Peppers, Radiohead, The Roots with D'Angelo and The Beach Boys.

The Soul Rebels catalog of albums has been received well by critics, their best-reviewed album being their latest, Unlock Your Mind. The album reached No. 5 on iTunes Jazz charts and was the No. 1 most added album on CMJ magazine's hip-hop playlists.

== Awards ==
The Soul Rebels won Best Rap or Hip-Hop Album/Mixtape at the 2013 Off Beat Awards and nominated for Best Of The Beat: Off Beat Awards in 2013, 2012, 2011, 2010, 2009 and in 2008.

In 2012, The Soul Rebels were nominated for four 2012 Best Of The Beat Awards; Best Artist Of The Year, Best Album Of The Year, Best Brass Band Of The Year and Best Brass Band Album Of The Year. They won Best Brass Band Album Of The Year.

The Soul Rebels won New Orleans' Big Easy award in 2010, 2008 and in 1999, as well as nominations in 2012, 2011 and in 2009.

== Discography ==
- 1995 – Let Your Mind Be Free [Mardi Gras Records]
- 1998 – No More Parades [Tuf America Records]
- 1999 – More Jams from No More Parades [Tuf America Records]
- 2004 – Rebelution [Barn Burner Music]
- 2006 – Urban Legend [Barn Burner Music]
- 2009 – No Place Like Home: Live in New Orleans [Independent]
- 2012 – Unlock Your Mind [Rounder Records]
- 2019 - Poetry in Motion [Artistry Music]
