= Late for the Future =

Studio album by Galactic
- Released: April 4, 2000
- Genres: Jazz funk, jam band, jazz fusion, New Orleans
- Length: 55:02
- Labels: Capricorn (2000); Zomba (2001)
- Producer: Nick Sansano

Galactic chronology
Crazyhorse Mongoose (1998)	Late for the Future (2000)	We Love 'Em Tonight: Live at Tipitina's (2001)

Professional ratings
Review scores
Source	Rating
AllMusic	2.5/5 stars
The Encyclopedia of Popular Music	3/5 stars

Late for the Future is the third studio album by the band Galactic, released in 2000.

The album reached No. 4 on the Billboard Top Contemporary Jazz Albums chart and No. 5 on the Billboard Top Jazz Albums chart.

== Production ==
The album was recorded at Kingsway Studios, in New Orleans, and was produced by Nick Sansano.

== Critical reception ==
Exclaim! wrote that the band "revitalise funk with such passionate playing that they invoke the genre's classic glory days of yesteryear." CMJ New Music Report deemed the album "addictive swamp funk and soul." Bass Player thought that "Galactic's New Orleans R&B sound has grown tougher—they're elbowing through a crowd rather than ambling down the street."

== Track listing ==
1. "Black Eyed Pea" – 3:46
2. "Baker's Dozen" – 4:18
3. "Thrill" – 3:28
4. "Century City" – 4:54
5. "Jeffe 2000" – 0:58
6. "Doublewide" – 4:54
7. "Running Man" – 4:12
8. "Villified" – 3:03
9. "As Big as Your Face" – 6:23
10. "Hit the Wall" – 6:05
11. "Action Speaks Louder Than Words" – 3:33
12. "Bobski 2000" – 1:41
13. "Two Clowns" – 6:17
14. "Untitled" – 1:29

== Personnel ==
Galactic:

Theryl DeClouet - vocals (tracks 3, 4, 7, 8, 11)
Ben Ellman - tenor/baritone saxophone, harmonica
Robert Mercurio - bass, vocals, photography
Stanton Moore - drums, loops
Richard Vogel - keyboards
Jeff Raines - guitar

Nick Sansano - producer, editing, mixing
Tom Coyne - mastering
Theresa Anderson - vocals
Jay Blakesberg - photography
Eugene Jackson - vocals (background)
David Lefkowitz - management
Roger Lewis - soprano/baritone saxophone
Brandon Lively - art direction, design
Danny Madorsky - assistant
Harvie S. - A&R
Donald Sylvester - vocals (background)
Sullivan Wallace - vocals (background)
Scott Williams - cover design
