= Into the Deep (album) =

Studio album by Galactic
- Released: July 17, 2015
- Genre: Jazz-funk
- Length: 42:55
- Label: Provogue
- Producer: Robert Mercurio; Ben Ellman

Galactic chronology
Carnivale Electricos (2012)	Into the Deep (2015)	Already Ready Already (2019)

Into the Deep is an album by the band Galactic. It was released on July 17, 2015.

Galactic formed in New Orleans in 1994. Their music combines funk, jazz, and other genres, and is heavily influenced by the musical heritage of their home city.

Into the Deep is the band's eighth studio album. It includes songs featuring different guest vocalists, such as Macy Gray, Mavis Staples, and Brushy One String, along with several instrumental tracks. It peaked at #22 on the Billboard 200, and at #1 on the Billboard Contemporary Jazz Albums chart.

== Critical reception ==
In NPR, Elizabeth Blair wrote, "For 20 years, the New Orleans band Galactic has made people dance at clubs, festivals, house parties — you name it. 'A first-rate funk band' is how The New York Times describes it. The group's half-dozen musicians hold their own without a regular vocalist. For their ninth album, Into the Deep, they invited several singers to guest star: big names like Mavis Staples and Macy Gray, old friends JJ Grey and David Shaw, and new discoveries like Jamaican-born singer Brushy One String (named for his one-stringed guitar)."

In American Songwriter, Hal Horowitz wrote, "Into the Deep, their eighth studio disc, expands an already eclectic palette based in funk but that also includes liberal doses of hip-hop, jazz, soul, blues and even electronica. Galactic is blissfully unconcerned that every track is different enough to almost obscure their own identity as they continue to create music that's fun, superbly crafted and wildly eclectic."

In AllMusic, James Christopher Monger wrote, "More song-oriented than ever, Into the Deep does a nice job showcasing both the band and the guest vocalists.... Throughout it all, co-founders, producers, and arrangers Ben Ellman and Robert Mercurio sonically map out a NOLA that's as vibrant and forward thinking as it is steeped in the region's rich culture, cementing the band's reputation (20 years in) as both innovators and stalwart defenders of tradition."

In PopMatters, John Garratt wrote, "And so Galactic continues to fly, not into uncharted territory but to the territories that we found before, explored, had fun, left, and sort of forgot about for a while. Bands like Galactic are good for this sort of thing: reviving yesterday's sounds without the gimmicks."

In The Boston Globe, Steve Morse wrote, "New Orleans party band Galactic has hit on a smart formula by releasing albums that showcase multiple vocalists spanning numerous genres, with jammy instrumentals providing extra sauce.... Galactic backs each act with professional, jazz-influenced ease and, on some songs, a hedonistic, dance-rock pulse a la Prince, all the while keeping its Mardi Gras flavor. "

In Glide Magazine, Shawn Donohue wrote, "On Into the Deep the band has polished up the grime from the gutters of the Bywater and made an album more worldly sounding. Less concept, more of just a collection of smooth grooving tracks that touches all the genre labels. While not as structured as their recent successfully offerings it still flows easily and contains some shining moments."

In Blues Blast Magazine, Steve Jones wrote, "Galactic is a staple of the New Orleans music scene, playing a blend of funk and jazz jam band music.... [Into the Deep] is something for those who like a modernistic approach to New Orleans music that has evolved into using hip hop, funk and jazz to deliver a great sound."

In Black Grooves, Anna Polovick wrote, "Into the Deep proves that after twenty years, Galactic still has an indisputable funk sensibility that allows them to create equally excellent ballads, party songs, and instrumental jams all while representing their unique New Orleans sound."

In Tahoe Onstage, Garrett Bethmann wrote, "Galactic has always been a dynamic and thrilling live machine that has come to be a sort of touring ambassador for the definitive musical gumbo of New Orleans.... The band is just going out and representing what it is at this stage in its history, a crack outfit that can pull from myriad influences to create its own unique vision."

== Track listing ==
1. "Sugar Doosie" (Galactic, Corey Henry)
2. "Higher and Higher" (Galactic, JJ Grey) – featuring JJ Grey
3. "Into the Deep" (Galactic, David Shaw, Natalie Hinds, Jim Greer) – featuring Macy Gray
4. "Dolla Diva" (Galactic, Shaw, Maggie Koerner) – featuring David Shaw and Maggie Koerner
5. "Long Live the Borgne" (Galactic)
6. "Right On" (Galactic, Ms. Charm Taylor) – featuring Ms. Charm Taylor
7. "Domino" (Galactic, Ryan Montbleau) – featuring Ryan Montbleau
8. "Buck 77" (Galactic)
9. "Does It Really Make a Difference" (Galactic, John Michael Rouchell) – featuring Mavis Staples
10. "Chicken in the Corn" (Galactic, Andrew Anthony Chin) – featuring Brushy One String
11. "Today's Blues" (Galactic)

== Personnel ==
Galactic

- Ben Ellman – saxophone
- Robert Mercurio – bass
- Stanton Moore – drums, percussion
- Jeff Raines – guitar
- Rich Vogel – keyboards

Additional musicians

- Shamarr Allen – trumpet ("Sugar Doosie", "Buck 77", "Today's Blues")
- Corey "Boe Money" Henry – trombone ("Sugar Doosie", "Buck 77", "Today's Blues")
- Gregory Veals – trombone ("Sugar Doosie", "Today's Blues")
- Chadrick Honore – trumpet ("Sugar Doosie", "Buck 77", "Today's Blues")
- Nick Ellman – alto saxophone ("Right On", "Does It Really Make a Difference")
- Ian Bowman – tenor saxophone ("Right On", "Does It Really Make a Difference")
- John Culbreth – trumpet ("Right On", "Does It Really Make a Difference")
- Adam Theis – trombone, trumpet ("Domino")
- Erica Falls – background vocals ("Into the Deep")
- Maggie Koerner – background vocals ("Higher and Higher")
- Margie Perez – background vocals ("Domino", "Does It Really Make a Difference")
- Monica McIntyre – background vocals ("Domino", "Does It Really Make a Difference")
- Stevie Blacke – strings ("Into the Deep")
- David Shaw – guitar, background vocals ("Into the Deep")

Production

- Production, engineering, recording: Robert Mercurio, Ben Ellman
- Mixing, mastering: Count At Chocula (except "Higher and Higher" mixed by Dan Prothero)
- Additional engineering: Ben Lorio, Jim Greer, Mathieu Lejeune, Chris George
- Artwork: Roy Koch
