= Vintage Reserve =

Compilation album by Galactic
- Released: April 15, 2003
- Genre: Jazz funk, jam band, jazz fusion, New Orleans
- Label: Volcano Entertainment

Galactic chronology
We Love 'Em Tonight: Live at Tipitina's (1999)	Vintage Reserve (2003)	Ruckus (2003)

Professional ratings
Review scores
Source	Rating
Artist Direct	link

Vintage Reserve is a compilation album by the New Orleans, LA based band Galactic. It features tracks found on their three previous records, as well as two live, unreleased tracks.

== Track listing ==
1. "Welcome to New Orleans" – 0:14
2. "Something's Wrong With This Picture" – 5:54
3. "Doublewide" – 4:52
4. "Tighten Your Wig" – 3:11
5. "Century City" – 4:54
6. "Jeffe 2000" – 0:58
7. "Go Go" – 3:02
8. "Start from Scratch" – 4:12
9. "Bobski 2000" – 1:41
10. "Get a Head On" – 5:36
11. "Green Minute" – 3:48
12. "Metermaid" – 1:37
13. "Quiet Please" – 10:54
14. "Sew Sew Sew" (live) – 7:51 featuring Big Chief Monk Boudreaux & the Golden Eagles Mardi Gras Indians, Triple Threat, and Lil Rascals Brass Band
15. "Doo Rag" (live) – 8:52 featuring Triple Threat

== Personnel ==
Galactic:

- Theryl DeClouet - vocals
- Ben Ellman - harmonica, programming, saxophone
- Robert Mercurio - bass, vocals, photography
- Stanton Moore - drums, loops
- Richard Vogel - keyboards
- Jeff Raines - guitar
- Dan Prothero - producer
- Chaz Harper - remastering
- Dino Perrucci - photography
