= Into the Deep (FIRST) =

FIRST INTO THE DEEP
Season Information
- Year: 2024–2025
- Championship location: George R. Brown Convention Center

Awards
- Inspire Award winner: 18139: Rebel Robotics
- Champions: 11260: Up-A-Creek Robotics Winning Alliance - Captain; 20870: Team Matrix Winning Alliance - 1st Team Selected; 19746: The Disruptingly Robocephalic BrainSTEM Robotics Team Winning Alliance - 2nd Team Selected; 18030: ViperBots Leviathan Finalist Alliance - Captain; 20871: Eureka Finalist Alliance - 1st Team Selected; 24751: GreenAms Robotics Team Finalist Alliance - 2nd Team Selected

Into The Deep (stylized in all caps) is the FIRST Tech Challenge game for the 2024–2025 season. FIRST reported more than 853,000 students impacted across its programs, more than 5,400 official FIRST events in 114 countries, and more than 493,000 volunteer, mentor, and educator roles contributing more than 39 million hours.

== Overview ==
In this season, two competing alliances, red and blue, compete to earn as many points as possible. To do so, the game offers samples, small rectangular-prism-shaped scoring elements that can be scored in net zones or baskets. Alliance-specific samples can be combined with clips to create specimens, which can then be scored on the chamber of the submersible, the central structure of the field.

== Points system ==
During a match, alliances earn points by completing various scoring actions. The alliance's final score is used to determine the match result, while ranking points earned from wins and ties affect the competition standings.

INTO THE DEEP point values
Scoring action	Location / Level	AUTO	TELEOP
PARK	Observation Zone	3	3
SAMPLE	Net Zone	2	2
SAMPLE	Low Basket	4	4
SAMPLE	High Basket	8	8
SPECIMEN	Low Chamber	6	6
SPECIMEN	High Chamber	10	10
ASCENT	Level 1	3	3
ASCENT	Level 2	15	
ASCENT	Level 3	30	
Tie		1 Ranking Point	
Win		2 Ranking Points	

== Advancement ==
Teams can only advance from events hosted in their own region. Competing outside their region is permitted, but does not provide a path to advancement.

Table 4-1: Advancement Order
Position	Single Division Events (4–10 Teams)	Single Division Events (≥11 Teams)	Dual Division Events
0	Qualifying Tournament Host Team		
1	Inspire Award, 1st Place		
2	Event 1st Place Alliance Captain		
3	Event 1st Place Alliance Partner		
4	Think Award, 1st Place	Inspire Award, 2nd Place	Inspire Award, 2nd Place
5	Connect/Motivate Award	Inspire Award, 3rd Place (if Awarded)	Inspire Award, 3rd Place
6	2nd Place Alliance Captain	2nd Place Alliance Captain	1st Place Alliance Captain, finalist division
7	Design/Control/Innovate Award	Think Award, 1st Place	Think Award, 1st Place
8	2nd Place Alliance Partner	2nd Place Alliance Partner	1st Place Alliance Partner, finalist division
9		Connect Award, 1st Place	Connect Award, 1st Place
10		3rd Place Alliance Captain	2nd Place Alliance Captain, winning division
11		Innovate Award, 1st Place	Innovate Award, 1st Place
12		3rd Place Alliance Partner	2nd Place Alliance Captain, finalist division
13		Control Award, 1st Place	Control Award, 1st Place
14		Motivate Award, 1st Place	Motivate Award, 1st Place
15		Design Award, 1st Place	Design Award, 1st Place
16		Next Highest Ranked Team not already advanced	2nd Place Alliance Partner, winning division
17		Next Highest Ranked Team not already advanced	2nd Place Alliance Partner, finalist division
18	Next Highest Ranked Team not already advanced	Next Highest Award (2nd and 3rd places); Not Already Advanced	Next Highest Award (2nd and 3rd places); Not Already Advanced
19		Next Highest Ranked Team not already advanced	Next Highest Ranked Team not already advanced, winning division
20			Next Highest Ranked Team not already advanced, finalist division
