= Carnivale Electricos =

Studio album by Galactic
- Released: February 21, 2012
- Genres: Jazz funk, fusion, New Orleans music
- Length: 39:09
- Label: ANTI-
- Producers: Robert Mercurio, Count, Ben Ellman

Galactic chronology
The Other Side of Midnight: Live in New Orleans (2011)	Carnivale Electricos (2012)	Into the Deep (2015)

Carnivale Electricos is the seventh studio album by the New Orleans–based jazz fusion/funk group Galactic. Carnivale Electricos is a concept album about the annual celebration of Mardi Gras; the culmination of Carnival season leading up to Ash Wednesday. The album features many notable guest collaborators such as Cyril Neville, Ivan Neville, Mystikal, Al "Carnival Time" Johnson, David Shaw (of the Revivalists), Shamarr Allen, Big Chief Juan Pardo, Maggie Koerner, and others. It was primarily produced by Ben Ellman and Robert Mercurio, as well as other members of the band.

== Commercial performance ==
The album debuted at No. 118 on the Billboard 200, No. 3 on the Jazz Albums chart, and No. 1 on the Contemporary Jazz Albums chart, selling 4,500 copies in the first week. It has sold 21,000 copies in the United States as of June 2015.

== Track listing ==
1. "Ha Di Ka" – (with Big Chief Juan Pardo and the Golden Comanche)
2. "Hey Na Na" – (with David Shaw and Maggie Koerner)
3. "Magalenha" – (with Casa Samba)
4. "Voyage Ton Flag"
5. "Out in the Street" – (with Cyril and Ivan Neville)
6. "JuLou"
7. "Move Fast" – (with Mystikal and Mannie Fresh)
8. "Karate" – (with KIPP Renaissance High School Marching Band)
9. "Guero Bounce"
10. "Carnival Time" – (with Al "Carnival Time" Johnson)
11. "Attack"
12. "O Co co da Galinha" – (with Moyseis Marques)
13. "Ash Wednesday Sunrise"

== Charts ==
Chart (2015)	Peak position
US Billboard 200	118
US Contemporary Jazz Albums (Billboard)	1
US Heatseekers Albums (Billboard)	1
US Independent Albums (Billboard)	15
US Top Jazz Albums (Billboard)	3
US Indie Store Album Sales (Billboard)	19
