= Papa Grows Funk =

American funk band from 2000 to 2013

- Origin: New Orleans, Louisiana
- Genres: funk, Jazz
- Years active: 2000-2013
- Members: John "Papa" Gros; June Yamagishi; Jason Mingledorf; Marc Pero; Jeffery "Jellybean" Alexander
- Past members: Russell Batiste, Jr.

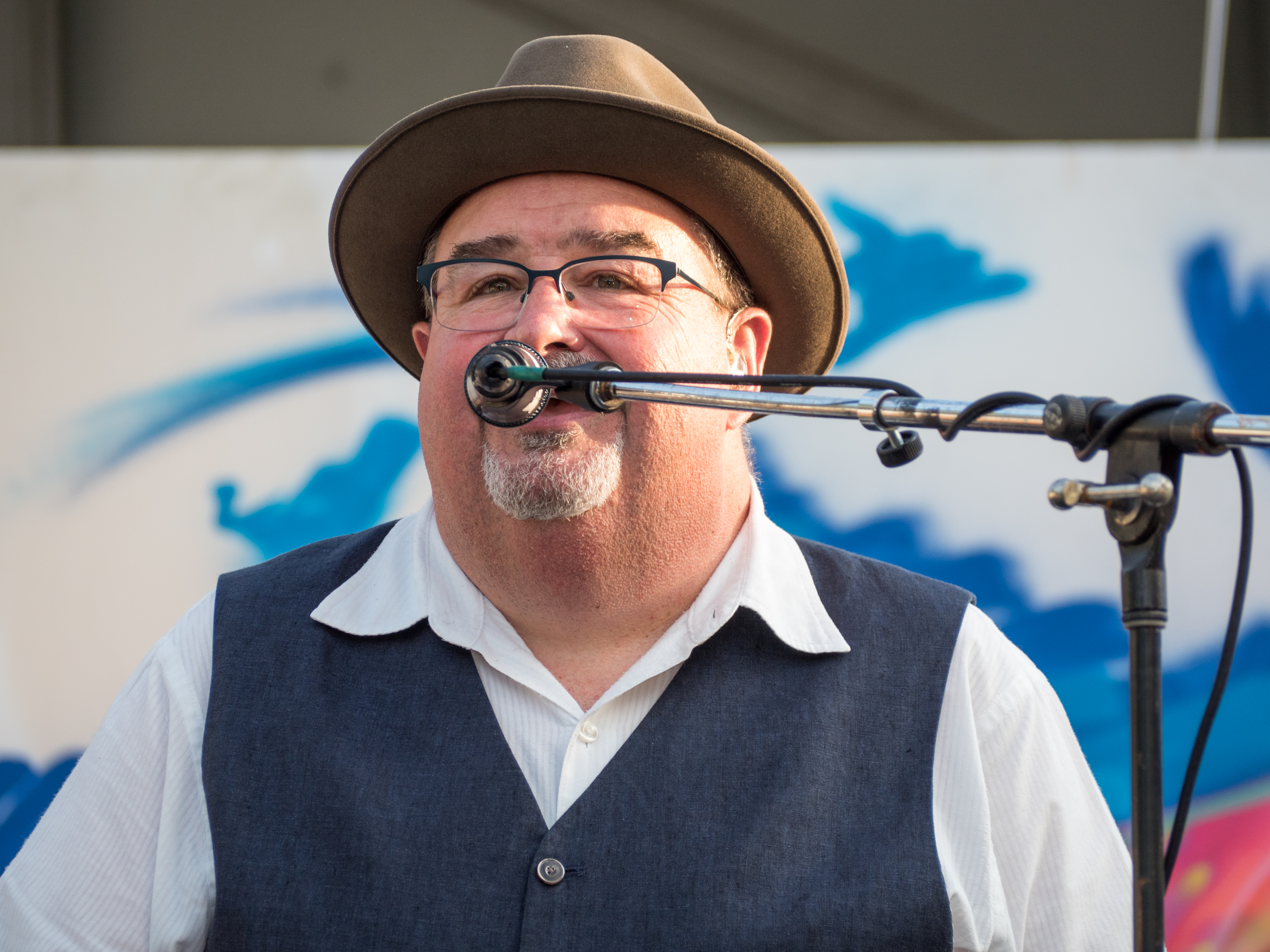
John "Papa" Gros performing in 2019

Papa Grows Funk is an American funk band from New Orleans, Louisiana. The band was started by frontman John "Papa" Gros in early 2000, developing from a series of Monday night jam sessions helmed by Gros at New Orleans’ Maple Leaf Bar. Gros would invite some friends down to play, and the impromptu jams became a common bond for a handful of musicians, including guitarist June Yamagishi, sax player Jason Mingledorf, bassist Marc Pero and drummer Jeffery "Jellybean" Alexander, who now make up Papa Grows Funk.

They played in front of a hometown crowd at The Voodoo Experience held at City Park in New Orleans over Halloween weekend 2009.

== Hiatus ==
It has been widely reported that the band has been on "indefinite hiatus" since June 29, 2013.

== Discography ==
- Doin' It (2001)
- Shakin' (2003)
- Live at the Leaf (2006)
- Mr. Patterson's Hat (2007)
- Needle in the Groove (2012)
- The Last Leaf (Live) (2016)
