= We Love 'Em Tonight: Live at Tipitina's =

Live album by Galactic
- Released: July 10, 2001
- Genre: Jazz funk, jam band, New Orleans
- Label: Volcano Entertainment
- Producer: Nick Sansano

Galactic chronology
Late for the Future (2000)	We Love 'Em Tonight: Live at Tipitina's (2001)	Vintage Reserve (2003)

We Love 'Em Tonight: Live at Tipitina's is a live album by the New Orleans, LA based band Galactic. Recorded live at Tipitina's Uptown in New Orleans, LA.

== Track listing ==
1. "Crazyhorse Mongoose" – 6:35
2. "Moog Marmalade" – 5:20
3. "Bobski/Jeffe 2000" – 2:48
4. "Vilified" – 3:50
5. "I Get Lifted" (Harry Wayne Casey, Richard Finch) – 3:57
6. "My Mind Is Hazy" – 5:17
7. "Baker's Dozen" – 9:27
8. "Blue Pepper" – 5:28
9. "Lumpology" – 4:20
10. "Working in the Coal Mine" (Allen Toussaint) – 2:53
11. "Shibuya" – 9:50
12. "Two Clowns" – 8:56
13. "Sweet Leaf" (Ozzy Osbourne, Tony Iommi, Geezer Butler, Bill Ward) – 4:25

== Chart performance ==
Chart	Peak position
US Top Contemporary Jazz Albums (Billboard)	3

== Personnel ==
Galactic:

Theryl DeClouet - vocals (tracks 4, 5, 6, 13)
Ben Ellman - harmonica, saxophone
Robert Mercurio - bass, vocals, photography
Stanton Moore - drums, loops
Richard Vogel - keyboards
Jeff Raines - guitar

Nick Sansano - producer, editing, mixing
Tom Coyne - mastering
Theresa Anderson - background vocals (track 4)
Ethan Allen - engineer
Nick Gamma - art direction
Cyrille Taillandier - digital editing
Elisa Garcia - design
