= Ben Ellman =

American musician

- Also known as: Gypsyphonic Disko
- Origin: United States
- Genres: Funk, Jazz, New Orleans
- Occupations: Saxophonist, Harmonica player, Producer, DJ
- Instruments: Saxophone, Harmonica
- Member of: Galactic

Ben Ellman is an American saxophonist, harmonica player, and producer most widely known as a member of the New Orleans–based funk band Galactic, with whom he has made eight studio albums. He joined the group in 1994, when they were known as Galactic Prophylactic. Ben also works as a DJ under the name Gypsyphonic Disko, where he mixes New Orleans style funk with klezmer, Eastern European and other exotic music.

== Production ==
As a producer Ben has overseen Galactic's recordings since 2007, and has produced artists such as Trombone Shorty, Stoop Kids, The Revivalists, Walter “Wolfman” Washington, Soul Rebels, Big Freedia, as well as singer-songwriter Ryan Montbleau and rapper Lyrics Born. Ellman produced the Trombone Shorty album “Backatown”, which was nominated for a Grammy in 2010, and The Revivalists hit album “Men Amongst Mountains”, which included the single “Wish I Knew You” which went to No. 1 on Billboard's Alternative chart in 2015

== Other Pursuits ==
As a sideman Ellman has played on recordings by Harry Connick, The Afghan Whigs, Ani DiFranco, Theryl “Houseman", The Royal Fingerbowl and Corey Henry. In March 2019, Galactic's members purchased the legendary New Orleans venue Tipitina's, making Ellman one of the club's owners.
