= Monkeypot Merganzer =

Studio album by Critters Buggin
- Released: 1997
- Recorded: engineered by Eric Rosse, Matt Bayles and Chris Furman
- Length: 39:23
- Label: independent, Kufala
- Producer: Dennis Herring, Stone Gossard

Critters Buggin chronology
Host (1996)	Monkeypot Merganzer (1997)	Bumpa (1998)

Professional ratings
Review scores
Source	Rating
Allmusic	3.5/5 stars

Monkeypot Merganzer is the third studio album by Critters Buggin of Seattle, Washington and was released in 1997. Originally released independently, Monkeypot Merganzer was reissued by Kufala Recordings in 2004.

== Track listing ==
1. "Space Rant" - 4:30
2. "Snaggletooth" - 4:15
3. "Mellow G" - 4:33
4. "Hello Kitty" - 7:04
5. "Burundi" - 6:18
6. "AIDS" - 1:55
7. "Na-Na" - 2:46
8. "I'm Hungary" - 7:21
9. "Bonus Track" - 0:41

== Personnel ==
- Matt Chamberlain - drums
- Brad Houser - bass
- Skerik - saxophone

Guest musicians

- "Space Rant" - Maurice Caldwell (vocal)
- "Hello Kitty" - Dave Palmer (Rhodes wah-wah)
- "AIDS" - Eyvind Kang (violin and air-hu), Keith Lowe (upright bass), Craig Flory (bass clarinet), Mike Dillon (vibes and percussion)
