= Ponga =

Ponga may refer to:

== People with the surname ==
- Alcide Ponga, French politician
- Kalyn Ponga (born 1998), Australian rugby league footballer
- Maurice Ponga (born 1947), French politician

== Places ==
- Ponga, Arkhangelsk Oblast
- Ponga, Asturias, municipality in Spain
- Ponga, Boulgou

== Other uses ==
- Ponga (Cyathea dealbata), the silver tree fern endemic to New Zealand
- Ponga (band), an improvisational contemporary jazz/fusion ensemble
  - Ponga (album), debut album by the above

== See also ==
- Ponga Pandit, a 1975 Indian film
