= Chris Combs (composer) =

American composer (born 1983)

- Born: Christopher Kyle Combs; October 12, 1983 (age 42); Tulsa, Oklahoma, US
- Occupations: Composer, arranger, steel guitarist, guitarist, producer
- Instruments: Guitar, lap steel, steel guitar

Chris Combs is a composer, arranger, steel guitarist, and producer from Tulsa, Oklahoma. He has been a part of the jazz group Jacob Fred Jazz Odyssey since 2008 and has joined contemporary artists like George Porter Jr, Matt Chamberlain, Jeff Coffin, Steven Bernstein, Skerik, Johnny Vidacovich, and Mike Dillon on stage and in the studio. Combs released a self-titled solo album in October 2017 debuting a new project called COMBSY.

== Ludwig ==
In 2010, Jacob Fred Jazz Odyssey's reinterpretations of Beethoven's 3rd & 6th Symphonies premiered in June as a project entitled 'Ludwig'. The project found Combs playing lap steel on rearrangements of Beethoven's 3rd & 6th symphonies alongside a 50 piece orchestra on June 12 as a headline performance at the OK Mozart Festival. A feat never accomplished before on steel guitar. Down Beat called Ludwig "a tour de force of jazz melded with classical."

== The Race Riot Suite ==
In January 2011 JFJO recorded a suite of music based on the Tulsa race massacre. For its 21st album, Jacob Fred Jazz Odyssey reached into the dark annals of its hometown’s history and emerged with a masterwork: The Race Riot Suite. Written, arranged and orchestrated by Chris Combs, the album is a long-form conceptual piece that tells the devastating story of the 1921 Tulsa race massacre—a real estate-driven ethnocide occurring under the guise of citizen-dispensed justice.

The oil-elite, civic government and local press colluded to take advantage of a racially tense climate in Jim Crow-era Oklahoma, resulting in the death of hundreds of black Tulsans and the destruction of an entire city district. The Los Angeles Times wrote: "The adventurous jazz band's latest project pays tribute to Tulsa's Greenwood community, destroyed in a 1921 race riot, while evoking the creative output of 1920s Oklahoma…the score captures the energy of Greenwood's fervent churchgoers and the rollicking territory dance bands that crisscrossed the Southwest."

In addition to the permanent line-up of Combs (lap steel), Brian Haas (piano), Josh Raymer (drums) and Jeff Harshbarger (bass), the quartet enlisted the assistance of world class horn players Jeff Coffin (Béla Fleck, Dave Matthews Band), Steven Bernstein (Sex Mob, Levon Helm), Peter Apfelbaum (Hieroglyphics, Don Cherry), Mark Southerland (Snuff Jazz) and Matt Leland (a founding JFJO member).

The Race Riot Suite debuted live on May 20, 2011 with two sets performed by the album’s complete line-up (JFJO and guest horns) to a packed house at the Tulsa Performing Arts Center. In Fall of 2012 The Race Riot Suite reached #1 on the CMJ Jazz chart. The North American album release tour included two nights at the Jazz Standard in NYC, the Boom Boom Room in San Francisco, the University of California, San Diego, as well as a performances at Montreal Jazz Festival, High Sierra Music Festival, & the Bear Creek Music Festival.

Time Out New York says that “…the 12-part suite pinballs between majestic melodies, free improv and ragged New Orleans rhythms, sometimes all within the same song…expect a heavy dose of history, but an even heavier dose of forward-looking, down-home jazz.”

== COMBSY ==
With influences like Charles Mingus, Madlib, George Harrison, James Blake, J Dilla, Radiohead, Marc Ribot, “Combsy” is a lush, groove-heavy album that was primarily tracked in October 2016. The core tracks were recorded live as a trio to 2" tape at Fellowship Hall in Little Rock, AR with Aaron Boehler (bass) and Andrew Bones (drums, vibraphone). Horns were added at Marigny Studio in New Orleans, Combs added Brad Walker (tenor sax, Sturgill Simpson), Dan Oestreicher (bass and bari sax, Trombone Shorty), Carly Meyers (trombone, Roar).

== Selected discography ==
Album information
COMBSY
- COMBSY
- Released: October 2017 on Horton Records
Better Than Alone
- Chris Blevins
- Released: August 2017 on Horton Records
Mike Dee & Stone Trio [EP]
- Mike Dee & Stone Trio
- Released: March 2017 on Horton Records
The Battle For Earth [Comic Book / Live Album]
- Jacob Fred Jazz Odyssey
- Released: October 2016 on Royal Potato Family
Comet B
- Matt Chamberlain
- Released: February 2016, self released
Worker [EP]
- Jacob Fred Jazz Odyssey
- Released: September 2015 on Royal Potato Family
Gogo Plumbay 12" [EP]
- Gogo Plumbay
- Released: April 2012 on Horton Records
The Race Riot Suite
- Jacob Fred Jazz Odyssey
- Released: August 2011 on Kinnara Records
Stay Gold
- Jacob Fred Jazz Odyssey
- Released: June 2010 on Kinnara Records
The Sensation of Seeing Light [7" vinyl single]
- Jacob Fred Jazz Odyssey
- Released: April 2010 on Kinnara Records
Here With You
- Jared Tyler
- Released: 2010
One Day in Brooklyn [EP]
- Released: September 2009 on Kinnara Records
The New Tulsa Sound
- Featuring tracks from Gogo Plumbay and Stone Trio
- Released: September 2009 on Horton Records
Stone EP [EP]
- Stone Trio
- Released: September 2007
