= Guest (album) =

Studio album by Critters Buggin
- Released: 1994
- Recorded: Engineered by Chris Furman
- Length: 52:38
- Labels: Loosegroove, Kufala
- Producers: Dennis Herring, Stone Gossard, Critters Buggin

Critters Buggin chronology
Guest (1994)	Host (1996)

2nd cover
- 2004 re-release

Professional ratings
Review scores
Source	Rating
Allmusic	2/5 stars

Guest is the first studio album by the rock band Critters Buggin. It was released in 1994 through Stone Gossard's then new label Loosegroove. The album was reissued by Kufala Recordings in 2004.

== Track listing ==
1. "Shag" - 4:43
2. "Kickstand Hog" - 6:52
3. "Critters Theme" - 6:21
4. "T-Ski" - 3:12
5. "5/4 FTD" - 5:34
6. "Fretless Nostril" - 5:51
7. "Double Pot Roast Backpack" - 1:19
8. "Naked Truth" - 5:48
9. "Los Lobos" - 12:56

== Personnel ==
- John Bush - percussion, loops
- Matt Chamberlain - drums
- Brad Houser - bass
- Skerik - saxophone, guitar
- Prophet Omega - sampled vocals on "Shag"
- Dave Palmer - keyboards on "Double Pot Roast Backpack"
- Shawn Smith - vocals on "Naked Truth"
- Sophia - talk on "Naked Truth"
- Bruce Calder - static engineer
