= Ponga (album) =

Live album by Ponga
- Released: April 6, 1999
- Recorded: Recorded live at the O.K. Hotel in Seattle, Litho, Seattle and Stuart's Coffee House in Bellingham, Washington
- Genre: jazz/improvisation
- Label: Loosegroove

Ponga chronology
Ponga (1999)	The Ponga Remixes (1999)

Ponga is the first live album by the instrumental band Ponga. It was released in 1999 on Loosegroove. The album is a recording of live improvisation with no over dubs at the O.K. Hotel and Litho in Seattle and Stuart's Coffee House in Bellingham, Washington.

== Reception ==
Professional ratings
Review scores
Source	Rating
Allmusic	4.5/5 stars

The editorial staff of AllMusic Guide gave Ponga 4.5 out of five stars. Derrick A. Smith of All About Jazz also gave the recording a positive review, noting how it stood out from recordings of the period.

== Track listing ==
1. "Pimba"
2. "Pick Up the Pieces of Saturn"
3. "Naugahide"
4. "Blowtorch"
5. "Awesome Wells"
6. "Ponga Amore"
7. "Liberace in Space"
8. "Bookin"

== Personnel ==
Ponga

- Wayne Horvitz – keyboards
- Dave Palmer – keyboards
- Bobby Previte – drums
- Skerik – saxophone, samples

Technical personnel

- Mel Dettmar – engineering
