= Amoeba (album) =

Studio album by Critters Buggin
- Released: October 19, 1999
- Recorded: June – July 1999
- Studio: The Craft
- Genre: Ambient
- Length: 53:52
- Label: Loose Groove

Critters Buggin chronology
Bumpa (1998)	Amoeba (1999)	Stampede (2004)

Professional ratings
Review scores
Source	Rating
Allmusic	3/5 stars

Amoeba is a studio album by electronic band Critters Buggin, released on October 19, 1999, on Loose Groove.

== Track listing ==
No.	Title	Length
1.	"Space Muffla"	9:14
2.	"Sonic Broom"	5:51
3.	"Slow and Bulbous"	5:26
4.	"Taint"	2:18
5.	"Imperial Turkey Blister"	4:53
6.	"Emperor Chi Chi"	8:52
7.	"D Lab 2"	7:02
8.	"Hairy Partched"	4:35
9.	"Beaver Builds a Dam"	5:40

== Personnel ==
- Matt Chamberlain - drums
- Brad Houser - bass
- Mike Dillon - percussion
- Skerik - saxophones, keyboards, effects, vocals
- Earl Harvin - bass loop and percussion on "Beaver Builds a Dam"
