= Host (Critters Buggin album) =

Studio album by Critters Buggin
- Released: 1997
- Recorded: December 18–20, 21-23, 1995
- Venue: OK Hotel
- Studio: Bad Animals (Seattle, Washington)
- Length: 57:31
- Label: Loosegroove, Kufala
- Producer: Eric Rosse

Critters Buggin chronology
Guest (1994)	Host (1997)	Monkeypot Merganzer (1997)

2nd cover
- 2004 re-release

Host is the second studio album by Critters Buggin of Seattle, Washington and was released in 1997. It was recorded December 18–20, 1995 at Bad Animals Studio, and December 21–23, 1995 live at OK Hotel. Originally released by Loosegroove, Host was reissued by Kufala Recordings in 2004. It was engineered by Bret Eliason and Sam Hofstedt, and mixed by Eric Rosse

== Track listing ==
1. "Mount Blasta" - 4:22
2. "Mullet Cut" - 5:40
3. "Crowley Dissertation" - 0:49
4. "Bill Gates 5:52
5. "Red Eyed Wonder" - 6:12
6. "I Ain't No Adobe Hut" - 3:33
7. "Bubble Boy" - 0:59
8. "Sheets" - 4:59
9. "Manhog's Day in the Park" - 5:50
10. "B.H. Goes to a Freak" - 5:07
11. "Sex Doily Intro" - 3:45
12. "Sex Doily" - 5:08
13. "Nahmani" - 1:53
14. "Bonus track" - 3:20

== Personnel ==
- Matt Chamberlain - drums set, tabla, guitar, lap slide, loops, percussion
- Brad Houser - bass, bass clarinet
- Skerik - saxophone, piano, rhodes and guitar
- Doug Stringer - djembe on "B.H. Goes to a Freak"
- Tim Young is Bubble Boy
- Doc Britton - the voice of Francis E. Dec on "Bill Gates"
