= Skerik =

American musician (born 1964)

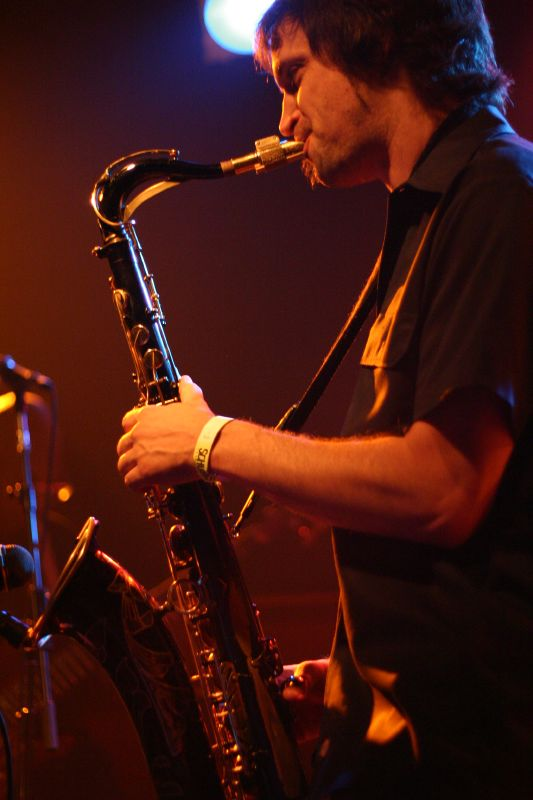
- Skerik with The Headhunters, Schuba's, June 21, 2005

Background information
- Also known as: Eric Walton
- Born: November 19, 1964 (age 61); Seattle, Washington, U.S.
- Genre: Jazz
- Occupation: Musician
- Instruments: Saxophone, vocals, electronics
- Labels: Hyena, Ropeadope
- Website: skerikmusic.com

Eric "Skerik" Walton (born November 19, 1964) is an American saxophonist from Seattle, Washington. Performing on the tenor and baritone saxophone, often with electronics and loops, he is a pioneer in a playing style that has been called saxophonics.

He is a founding member of Critters Buggin, Garage a Trois, Ponga, Tuatara, Lorbo and Skerik's Syncopated Taint Septet. He is also an original member of both Les Claypool's Fancy Band and Frog Brigade. Skerik also worked with grunge band Mad Season.

== History ==
Skerik, born Eric Walton, began playing saxophone in the fifth grade. His father's love of jazz was an early inspiration. He played saxophone, keyboards and percussion in a rock band called Uncle Jam. He has cited The Rolling Stones and Pink Floyd as bands from that time period who brought saxophone into rock music well. In the 1980s he travelled to London, Paris and the South Pacific working day jobs and playing in a variety of bands. His friendship with Leif Totusek introduced him to South African music and Zaire soukous bands in London where he first began playing music full time.

Skerik returned to Seattle in the late 1980s where he played with Sadhappy. In the early 1990s he joined three ex-members of New Bohemians to form Critters Buggin (who have remained active through 2008). Projects since that time have included Ponga (Wayne Horvitz and Bobby Previte), Tuatara (Peter Buck, Scott McCaughey and Craig Flory) and solo works of Stanton Moore as well as Garage A Trois (also including Charlie Hunter). Beginning 2000 Skerik was a member of every incarnation of Les Claypool's Frog Brigade and Fancy Band. In 2001 Skerik played the Pacific Northwest portion of Roger Waters' tour, reproducing the sax lead in "Money".

In 2002, Skerik formed Syncopated Taint Septet with fellow Seattle musicians. After touring nationally, their 2006 studio release Husky received very positive reviews.

Skerik won the award of "Northwest Jazz Instrumentalist of the Year" at the 2003 Earshot Jazz Golden Ear Awards.

Skerik has expressed support of music education for young people and support for activism such as the voting project HeadCount. In interviews he has discussed creative integrity and spontaneity. He has also provided music workshops.

== Various projects ==
Skerik performing with Trey Anastasio & Les Claypool's Fancy Band in Atlanta, Georgia

Skerik is a founding member of Critters Buggin, Garage a Trois (which has included Stanton Moore, Charlie Hunter, Mike Dillon, and Marco Benevento), Crack Sabbath, and The Dead Kenny G's. Skerik is an original member of Les Claypool's Fancy Band and Frog Brigade, Bobby Previte's Ponga and Coalition of the Willing and Joe Doria's McTuff. In the 1990s, he was also a member of Tuatara (with Peter Buck) and Seattle-based Sadhappy.

Skerik has toured with Fred Wesley, Mike Clark and The Headhunters, Wayne Horvitz (Zony Mash), Mad Season and Roger Waters. He has performed with Pearl Jam, Bonnie Raitt, The Meters, Galactic, Dumpstaphunk, Johnny Vidacovich, Jacob Fred Jazz Odyssey, and Ween.

In Seattle, Skerik leads Seattle-based punk-jazz band Skerik's Syncopated Taint Septet. He is a founding member of Seattle's Crack Sabbath. He is also a member of Seattle-based McTuff.

In New Orleans, he is a member of Maelstrom Trio; the trio includes long-time mates keyboardist Brian Coogan and drummer Simon Lott. The Maelstrom Trio combines disparate elements such as free jazz, funk, metal and textural music. Skerik and percussionist Mike Dillon have toured as a trio with New Orleans bassist James Singleton as Illuminasti.

Skerik and Dillon also perform as a trio called The Dead Kenny G's with alternate third members. National tours have included keyboardist Brian Haas and bassist Brad Houser. With Houser they have also toured as "Critters Buggin Trio"; further, in 2009, they released a debut CD entitled Bewildered Herd. As the band's name implies, there is an expressed disdain for smooth jazz and commercialism. Skerik has described The Dead Kenny G's as a "free-jazz version of The Melvins."

== Discography ==
- 2001: Psychochromatic (Skerik)
- 2002: Skerik's Syncopated Taint Septet (Ropeadope)
- 2002: Black Frames Solarallergy (independent)
- 2004: Crack Sabbath Bar Slut (Independent)
- 2006: Left for Dead in Seattle (1995–2003 independent)
- 2006: Skerik's Syncopated Taint Septet Husky (Hyena)
- 2009: The Dead Kenny G's Bewildered Herd (independent)
- 2010: Skerik's Syncopated Taint Septet Live at The Triple Door (Royal Potato Family)
- 2011: The Dead Kenny G's Operation: Long Leash (independent)
- 2012: Skerik's Bandalabra Live at the Royal Room (Royal Potato Family)
- 2012: Skerik's Bandalabra Live at the Comet (independent)
- 2017: Skerik live at the Chapel volume 1
- 2019: Skerik live at the Chapel volume 2

With Critters Buggin

- 1994: Guest (Loosegroove)
- 1997: Host (Loosegroove)
- 1997: Monkeypot Merganzer (Loosegroove)
- 1998: Bumpa (Loosegroove)
- 1998: Amoeba (Loosegroove)
- 2004: Stampede (Ropeadope)
- 2007: Get the Clackervalve and the Old Clobberd Biscuits Out and Smack the Grand Ham Clapper's Mother (DVD)
- 2009: Live in 95 at the OK Hotel – Seattle 1995 (independent)
- 2020: Count Cancelled Live 2001 Disastour (available on Bandcamp)

With Les Claypool

- 2001: Les Claypool's Frog Brigade Live Frogs Set 1 (Prawn Song)
- 2001: Les Claypool's Frog Brigade Live Frogs Set 2 (Prawn Song)
- 2002: Les Claypool's Frog Brigade Purple Onion (Prawn Song)
- 2005: 5 Gallons Of Diesel (DVD – Prawn Song)
- 2006: Of Whales and Woe (Prawn Song)
- 2007: Fancy (DVD – Prawn Song)

With Stanton Moore

- 1998: All Kooked Out! (Fog City)
- 1999: Garage a Trois Mysteryfunk (Fog City)
- 2002: Flyin' the Koop (Verve)
- 2003: Garage a Trois Emphasizer (Tone Cool)
- 2005: Garage a Trois Outre Mer (Telarc)
- 2006: III (Telarc)
- 2009: Garage a Trois Power Patriot (Royal Potato Family)
- 2011: Garage a Trois Always Be Happy, But Stay Evil (Royal Potato Family)
- 2021: Garage a Trois Calm Down Cologne (Royal Potato Family)

With Bobby Previte

- 1998: Ponga Ponga (Loosegroove)
- 1999: Ponga Remix (CD and clear vinyl) (Loosegroove)
- 2000: Ponga Psychological (P-Vine)
- 2006: Bobby Previte – Jamie Saft – Skerik Live in Japan 2003 (Word Public – DVD)
- 2006: Beta Popes Live Hate
- 2006: Coalition of the Willing (Ropeadope)
- 2007: April in New York – DVD
- 2008: Beta Popes White Hate (Veal)

With Sadhappy

- 1992: Depth Charge (Periscope)
- 1994: Before We Were Dead – Live (Periscope)
- 1994: The Good, Bad and the Skary (Periscope)

With others

- 1992: My Name Megacrush (C/Z Records)
- 1995: Mad Season Above (Columbia)
- 1995: Mad Season Live at the Moore (Columbia - DVD)
- 1996: Tuatara Breaking the Ethers (Epic)
- 1996: PHO BAC PHO BAC presents Afrophobia (Headrush)
- 1997: Suicide Jack In Churches and Saloons (Sujack)
- 1997: Timothy Young with very special people (Endless)
- 1998: Tuatara Trading with the Enemy (Epic)
- 1998: Calm Down Juanita Calm Down Juanita (Echo)
- 1999: Hairy Apes BMX Expatriape (AW/VR)
- 2000: Suicide Jack Honky Tonk Suicide (Sujack)
- 2000: Wayne Horvitz Four Plus One Ensemble From a Window (Avant)
- 2002: Calm Down Juanita Undertown (Independent)
- 2002: Tuatara Cinemathique (Fast Horse)
- 2003: Jacob Fred Jazz Odyssey Symbiosis Osmosis (Kufala)
- 2003: Jacek Kochan New Expensive Head (Gowi)
- 2003: The Mackrosoft Journey to Vaginus (Independent)
- 2003: The Clinton Administration One Nation Under a Re-Groove (Magnatude)
- 2004: Barrett Martin The Painted Desert (Fast Horse)
- 2007: Hella There's No 666 in Outer Space (Ipecac)
- 2008: Kayo Dot Blue Lambency Downward (Hydra Head)
- 2008: Todd Sickafoose Tiny Resistors (Cryptogramophone)
- 2008: Good Guys The Social Engagement (In the Dark)
- 2009: McTuff Volume 1 (McTuff/Joe Doria Music)
- 2012: Zony Mash + Horns (Wayne Horvitz) Live at the Royal Room
- 2014: Eyvind Kang Alastor: Book of Angels Volume 21 (Tzadik)
- 2014: Dionvox Your Name (RZY)
- 2014: Omaha Diner Omaha Diner (independent)
- 2015: DRKWAV The Purge with John Medeski-keys, Adam Deitch-drums, Skerik-saxophones and electronics
- 2016: Khu eeX The Wilderness Within with Bernie Worrell, Preston Singletary, Stanton Moore, etc.
- 2017: Khu eeX They forgot they survived with Bernie Worrell, Preston Singletary, etc.
- 2020: Khu eeX Heen with Bernie Worrell, Preston Singletary, etc.
- 2020: Nels Cline Share the Wealth with Cyro Batista, Trevor Dunn, Scott Amendola, Brian Marsella, Skerik
