= Saxophonics =

Saxophonics is the creation of sounds (both musical and non-musical) through the use of a saxophone and one or more electronic effects units, often altering the acoustic sound of the horn beyond recognition. Additionally, saxophonics often entails the use of altissimo, overtones, growling, and other extended techniques. The electronic effects may include distortion, doublers, loops, wah-wah, and tone generators.

Saxophonics is a recent term for techniques developed by saxophonists such as Eddie Harris and Sonny Stitt, who both began using the Varitone system to electrically amplify their saxophones during the late 1960s. In addition to playing the Varitone, Eddie Harris had experimented with looping techniques on his 1968 album Silver Cycles. David Sanborn and Traffic member Chris Wood employed effects such as wah-wah and delay on various recordings during the 1970s.

Rahsaan Roland Kirk often played several saxophones at once (though this technique has earlier roots in Wilbur Sweatman's vaudeville performances.), Kirk was also a notable practitioner of circular breathing, allowing him to play lengthy passages without pause.

Recent practitioners of saxophonics include Dana Colley (of Morphine) who, like Kirk, plays multiple saxophones simultaneously (tenor and baritone saxophone in Colley's case) and Skerik (Critters Buggin', et al.) who employs numerous effects with tenor and baritone saxophone; Ben Ellman, who plays tenor and baritone saxophone in Galactic; and Cochemea Gastelum, who plays alto saxophone with Robert Walter's 20th Congress.

Saxophonics is also the name of at least one saxophone ensemble, such as one based in Wiltshire, and another in Newcastle upon Tyne.

== See also ==
- George Braith
- London Saxophonic
