= Outre Mer =

Studio album by Garage A Trois
- Released: July 26, 2005
- Recorded: Galactic Studios
- Length: 45:52
- Label: Telarc
- Producer: Garage a Trois, Mike Napolitano

Garage A Trois chronology
Emphasizer (2003)	Outre Mer (2005)	Power Patriot (2009)

Outre Mer is the second full-length studio album by Garage A Trois released in 2005. Combining drums, percussion, eight-string guitar and saxophone, it is funk-influenced and emphasizes polyrhythmic grooves. Allmusic reviewer Sean Westergaard stated that with the release of Outre Mer Garage A Trois "evolved from a cool side project to a great band."

The full title of the album is Bande Originale du Filme de Outre Mer. Various album reviews state the album is a soundtrack for a French film also titled Outre Mer which was never released. The liner notes include a short story by Klaus Tontine and a special thanks to Tontine Films France. When Charlie Hunter was asked in an interview with Paul Olsen if inspiration came from the film he stated:

Basically, Stanton and Mike and Skerik and I got together and Stanton and I worked out a lot of grooves in the studio. That was our idea, just to put these grooves together—get "A" sections and "B" sections and just kind of build the music that way. And as far as [Tontine] went, I don't really know—I've never met him, I don't really have any contact with him. I was just down in New Orleans for the week that we recorded it.

Regarding the question of the film a reviewer Michael McCaw states, "Either way, the music speaks for itself."

== Track listing ==
1. "Outre Mer" - 4:44
2. "Bear No Hair" - 4:25
3. "The Machine" - 4:56
4. "Etienne" - 5:19
5. "Merpati" - 5:53
6. "The Dream" - 2:54
7. "Antoine" - 4:10
8. "Circus" - 2:07
9. "Needles" - 3:51
10. "The Dwarf" - 4:14
11. "Amanjiwo" - 3:17

== Personnel ==
- Charlie Hunter
- Skerik
- Stanton Moore
- Mike Dillon
