= Flash & Snowball =

Studio album by Aja West and Cheeba
- Released: 2005
- Recorded: Seattle, Washington
- Genre: Jazz-funk
- Length: 53:05
- Label: Macrosoft Records
- Producer: Macrosoft

Flash & Snowball is a 2005 album by Aja West and Cheeba. They are the founders of the Mackrosoft Records music label. Aja West is the leader and conductor of the funk group The Mackrosoft, and Cheeba is the leader of The Cheebacabra. Each brother plays in the other's band.

== Overview ==
The album was written in tribute to the two cats the artists grew up with, one of which was deaf but enjoyed "listening" to music. Flash & Snowball won Best Jam Album at the 2006 Independent Music Awards.

== Track listing ==
All tracks mixed by Aja West and Cheeba.

1. "The Arrival" – 3.56
2. "Alene's Farm" – 3:08
3. "Jaws" – 4:23
4. "Cindy" – 4:23
5. "Special Food" – 2:31
6. "Christmas Tinsel" – 3:15
7. "The Sister" – 2:53
8. "Me and Snow" – 5:07
9. "Cosmic Catnip" - 4:29
10. "Last of The Mokawkins" - 3:52
11. "Future Felines" - 3:53
12. "The Beanbag Game" - 3:51
13. "The Departure" - 2:38
14. "Saturday Candy" - 4:47

== Personnel ==
The following people contributed to Flash & Snowball.

Musicians

- Aja West – rhodes electric piano, clavinet, moog opus 3, ensoniq asr 10, juno 60, foot system pedal synth, octave cat, guitaret, organ, bass, percussion
- Cheeba – rhodes electric piano, clavinet, moog voyager, prophet 5, juno 60, ARP string ensemble, yamaha organ, tenor sax, melodica, percussion
- Rich Lambert – drums
- Alex Veley – rhodes electric piano, clavinet
- Mike Porcaro – electric bass
- Nick Allison – piano
- Steve Moore (musician) – wurlitzer, trombone, vibes
- Gould Effect – sax
- Steve Black – electric guitar
- Snakerhythms – sax with effects
- Cedric Ross – electric bass
- Heather Porcaro – worm guitar, synth
- Scott Koziol – electric bass
- Victor Tapia – conga, shaker, chimes

Production

- Aja West – producer, mixing
- Cheeba – producer, mixing
- Nathan Cheever – album cover artist
