= One Step Ahead of the Spider =

Studio album by MC 900 Ft. Jesus
- Released: 1994
- Genre: Hip-hop, spoken word, jazz
- Length: 56:31
- Label: American
- Producer: Mark Griffin

MC 900 Ft. Jesus chronology
Welcome to My Dream (1991)	One Step Ahead of the Spider (1994)

Singles from Album
- 1. "If I Only Had a Brain" Released: 1994; 2. "But If You Go" Released: 1994

One Step Ahead of the Spider is the third album by MC 900 Ft. Jesus, released in 1994. According to some advance CD copies, the album was originally titled Loony Tunes.

The album includes "If I Only Had a Brain", for which a music video was made that showed MC 900 Ft. Jesus reading an advertisement on selling brains. It peaked at No. 25 on Billboard's Modern Rock Tracks chart. The video was directed by Spike Jonze and was included in a Beavis and Butt-head episode. MC 900 Ft. Jesus promoted the album by touring with Consolidated.

== Production ==
MC 900 Ft. Jesus was influenced by the Miles Davis album Bitches Brew. He employed more of a band sound on One Step Ahead of the Spider; he spent six months listening to all the takes before adding vocals to his favorite tracks. Vernon Reid played guitar on "Stare and Stare". The album cover art is by graffiti artist Greg Contestabile.

== Critical reception ==
Professional ratings
Review scores
Source	Rating
AllMusic	4/5 stars
Calgary Herald	A
The Indianapolis Star	3/4 stars
Los Angeles Times	3/4 stars
Rolling Stone	2/5 stars

Trouser Press wrote that "Griffin's connection to hip-hop is gone: the music of 'New Moon' and 'Tiptoe Through the Inferno' are free-flowing jazz in which voice serves as just one of the instruments." The Calgary Herald likened the album to "a spoken word Burroughs meets Don Was when he Was (Not Was)."

The Los Angeles Times determined that "the record's balmy and organic grooves are far from the electronic dance pulse of previous records, and now he steeps his hip-hop sensibilities in minimal, goatee-stroking jazz." Rolling Stone called MC 900 Ft. Jesus "desperately wack, browbeatingly outre." The Indianapolis Star concluded that "while Griffin's hip-hop sensibilities may run closer to New Age, he delivers lyrics with a cadence that shifts between those of a finger-popping, beatnik poet and a world-weary commentator on race relations."

== Track listing ==
(All songs written by Griffin, except where noted.)

1. "New Moon" – 11:41
2. "But If You Go" – 5:39
3. "If I Only Had a Brain" – 3:46
4. "Stare and Stare" – 6:58 (Mayfield)
5. "Buried at Sea" – 4:46 (Griffin/Rollins)
6. "Tiptoe Through the Inferno" – 4:50
7. "Gracías Pepé" – 3:42 (Caldwell/Griffin)
8. "New Year's Eve" – 3:43
9. "Bill's Dream" – 8:15
10. "Rhubarb" – 3:11

== Personnel ==
- Mark Griffin – vocals, guitar, keyboard, trumpet
- Earl Harvin – drums
- Chris McGuire – tenor/soprano saxophone, bass clarinet, flute
- Dave Palmer – piano
- Drew Phelps – bass
- Vernon Reid – guitar
- Mike Dillon – congas, percussion
- Nikhil Pandya – tabla
- Rajiv Chakravarti – tampoura
- Analisa Ripke – backing vocals
