= Chris Combs =

Chris Combs may refer to:

- Chris Combs (composer) (born 1983), American composer, arranger, steel guitarist and producer
- Chris Combs (defensive lineman) (born 1976), American football player
- Chris Combs (tight end) (born 1958), American football player
