= Solarallergy =

Studio album by Black Frames
- Released: August 1, 2002
- Recorded: The Echo Lab, Denton Texas
- Genre: Jazz, Groove

Solarallergy is a jazz and rock instrumental album by Black Frames. Black Frames is a collaborative project by Skerik, Mike Dillon, Earl Harvin and Brad Houser from 2002. The album was accompanied by a national tour. Between the musicians are long-time associations: Dillon and Harvin from Ten Hands and Billy Goat; Skerik, Houser and Dillon from Critters Buggin. Though Dillon and Harvin are primarily percussionists, for Solarallergy all members are credited for percussion. Each musician is also credited for composition.

== Personnel ==
- Skerik - tenor saxophone, marimba, fancy sax
- Mike Dillon - vibes, marimba, tabla, percussion
- Earl Harvin - drums, vibes, marimba, guitar
- Brad Houser - bass, sentir, timpani

== Tracks ==
1. 25 Billion Stars Per Human (Dillon, Harvin)
2. French Farse (Harvin)
3. Hafta (Dillon)
4. Sonic Vapor (Skerik, Houser)
5. Mallet Cut (Dillon)
6. Turbulance (Dillon)
7. White Envelopes (Harvin)
8. Gophers (Dillon, Harvin)
9. Lucky Dog (Houser)
