= The Telefones =

American rock/pop band

- The Telefones in 1980; Gerard "Jerry" Dirkx, Steve Dirkx, Will Clay, Chris Dirkx

Background information
- Also known as: E=MC2; Teenage Queers
- Origin: Dallas, Texas, U.S.
- Genres: Rock, pop
- Years active: 1979–present
- Label: VVV
- Members: Gerard "Jerry" Dirkx; Chris Dirkx; John Painter; Dave Prez
- Past members: Steve Dirkx; Will Clay; Mark Griffin; Josh Diamond; Colin Marsh; Gary Eaton; Ken Wallman; Jeff Jones; Eddie Dunbar

The Telefones are a musical group based in Dallas, Texas. A regular act at the notable punk venue the Hot Klub in the 1980s, they are generally considered a pioneer Texas punk band, but have also been called “Dallas' first—and best—new wave band,” and yet also "[n]either punk nor new-wave." Their sound is a blend of many different styles and eras of rock and pop music.

The band was originally formed in 1979 under the name E=MC2, by three brothers: Jerry Dirkx on lead guitar and vocals, Chris Dirkx on drums, and Steve Dirkx on bass guitar. The January 1980 issue of Texas Monthly took note of the Dirkx brothers, calling them "an economical trio oozing juvenile enthusiasm." Will Clay became the fourth member of the band in the fall of 1979, playing saxophone and synthesizer. The name of the group was changed to The Telefones at about this same time. The band's first single, "The Ballad of Jerry Godzilla," was released in May 1980 on VVV Records, a Dallas label formed in 1979 by Neal Caldwell that also recorded other noted local acts like Bobby Soxx and The Fort Worth Cats. Six months later, their first LP, Vibration Change, was issued on the VVV label. Clay left the group and was replaced by trumpet player/vocalist/keyboardist Mark Griffin, who was featured along with the Dirkx brothers on Rock-Ola!, the group's second full-length LP, released in mid-1981. Griffin subsequently left the group as well, and later gained national attention as MC 900 Ft. Jesus.

Over the years, The Telefones have shared the bill with numerous notable musical acts, including The B52's, The Bangles, The Fabulous Thunderbirds, The Go-Go's, Oingo Boingo, Split Enz, Stevie Ray Vaughan and The Toadies. On August 6, 1982, the band R.E.M., still unknown in Dallas, opened for The Telefones at the Hot Klub.

The Telefones spent part of the 1980s in Los Angeles, then returned to Dallas in 1990. While in L.A., other musicians involved included Ken Wallman (keyboards and saxophone), Gary Eaton (guitar and vocals), Colin Marsh (bass), Eddie Dunbar (bass), Jeff Jones (keyboards and trumpet). Josh Diamond played keyboards in a late 1980s Dallas lineup. After a long hiatus, the band reformed and began playing dates in Dallas again in 2010, with original members Jerry Dirkx and Chris Dirkx in the lineup, along with John Painter on keyboards, and Dave Prez on bass guitar. Their set list consists of songs from all three decades of their existence, and pulls from multiple rock and pop music genres.

== Impact ==
The Telefones have been cited by the press as "one of the first and best alternative bands to come out of Dallas. Ever." "The Ballad of Jerry Godzilla" (the double A-side of the "She's In Love With The Rolling Stones" single) came to be regarded as "a landmark area recording." Original copies of The Telefones vinyl releases have become sought-after collector's items.

In 1980, The Telefones won the prestige Buddy Magazine Award for best songwriter, Jerry Dirkx for "She's In Love With The Rolling Stones."

In 1981, The Telefones won another award from Buddy Magazine for best new band, critic's choice.

In 1992, The Telefones were featured on the all-Texas punk retrospective compilation Bloodstains Across Texas.

In 2011, thirty-one years after the recording of "She's In Love With The Rolling Stones," the all-female Grand Rapids, Michigan punk band The Doctors' Wives released a response song in homage to The Telefones, entitled "Not In Love With The Rolling Stones."

In 2012, The Telefones' 1980 LP Vibration Change was named one of the top ten Dallas-Fort Worth area punk albums of all time, and the song "Rocket Rocket" from that album was listed as number 83 among the 100 best Texas songs of all time.

In 2014, The Telefones' song "The Ballad of Jerry Godzilla" was licensed for Episode 8 of the television series Halt and Catch Fire on AMC, which is set in 1983.

== Discography ==
- ESR – Are We Too Late For The Trend? (compilation album, featuring one track credited to The Telefones and one credited to E=MC2) (1979)
- "Scavenger of Death" (Single, b/w "Learn To Hate In The 80s") (credited as the Teenage Queers, with noted Texas punk artist Bobby Soxx) (1979)
- "The Ballad Of Jerry Godzilla" (Single, b/w "She’s In Love With The Rolling Stones") (1980)
- Vibration Change (LP) (1980)
- Rock-Ola! (LP) (1981)
- "Blessing" (Single, b/w "Gimme Technology") (Steve Dirkx solo, credited as Pinky Benson) (1981)
- VVV Records Presents Live At The Hot Klub (compilation album) (1982)
- Planets And Stars And Electric Guitars (EP) (1990)
- Bloodstains Across Texas (compilation album) (1992)
- The Telefones (EP) (2010)
- Marzipan (EP) (2010)
