= Stampede (Critters Buggin album) =

Studio album by Critters Buggin
- Released: 2004
- Recorded: By Mel Dettmer at The Craft, Litho and Aleph and by S. Husky Höskulds at Litho; all tracks mixed by Mel Dettmer at Aleph
- Length: 53:03
- Label: Ropeadope Records
- Producer: Matt Chamberlain; "Toad Garden" by Chamberlain and Eric Rosse

Critters Buggin chronology
Amoeba (1999)	Stampede (2004)

Stampede is a studio album by Critters Buggin of Seattle, Washington recorded and released in 2004. Although categorized as jazz, funk and rock reviews of Stampede mostly noted it as unique and boundary defying. Reviews also described it as similar to the electronic period of Miles Davis. Dave Segal of The Stranger stated the album "take(s) rewarding detours down psychedelic jazz corridors and non-kitsch exotica parlours."

Professional ratings
Review scores
Source	Rating
Allmusic	
All About Jazz	

== Track listing ==
1. "Hojo" - 4:27
2. "Panang" - 5:54
3. "Cloudburst" - 4:07
4. "Sisa Boto" - 3:46
5. "Persephone Under Mars" - 5:12
6. "We are New People" - 6:34
7. "Toad Garden" - 4:18
8. "Punk Rock Guilt" - 3:22
9. "Nasty Gnostic" - 5:02
10. "Dorothy" - 3:30
11. "Open the Door of Peace" - 6:50

== Personnel ==
- Matt Chamberlain - drums, percussion, programming and synths
- Skerik - tenor and baritone saxophones, Rhodes electric piano, acoustic grand piano, analog synths, distortion and effects
- Mike Dillon - percussion and vibes
- Brad Houser - bass
- Stone Gossard - synth - track 7
- Gus: guitar - track 7
- Jon Brion - piano - track 9, guitar - track 11
- Bachir and Mustapha Attar from Master Musicians of Jajouka - track 11
- Eyvind Kang - string arrangements - tracks 2, 5, 10
