= Jacob Fred Jazz Odyssey =

American instrumental music group

- Origin: Tulsa, Oklahoma
- Genres: Instrumental Music; Instrumental Hip Hop; Instrumental Rock; Jazz
- Years active: 1994–present
- Members: Brian Haas; Joshua Raymer; Chris Combs
- Website: JFJO.com

Jacob Fred Jazz Odyssey (or JFJO or The Fred) is an American instrumental music group started in Tulsa, Oklahoma in 1994. The band has had 16 different members in 20 years and put out 26 albums under the leadership of keyboardist/composer Brian Haas. The current lineup is Haas on piano, Fender Rhodes and synthesizers, Josh Raymer (joined 2007) on drums and Chris Combs (joined 2008) on electric guitar, lap steel, and synthesizer.

JFJO's music is not easily categorized; although it is mostly in the jazz idiom, it draws from hip hop, funk and rock music. Critic Alex Henderson describes the band's music as a "mildly avant-garde blend of jazz, rock and funk [that] draws on a wide variety of influences ... Often quirky, eccentric and abstract, JFJO favors an inside/outside approach but is usually more inside than outside", while critic Scott Yanow describes the group as "fascinating". Their live shows include compositions by John Coltrane, Duke Ellington, Charles Mingus, and Thelonious Monk among others, and include long experimental improvisations that, at times, could be considered atonal. Furthermore, the band's early years as an octet featured a strong hip-hop influence.

The group began with different monikers and members in the early '90s including founding members Haas and Reed Mathis, as well as Sean Layton, Dove McHargue, Matt Leland, and Kyle Wright. In 1994, after repeated viewings of This Is Spinal Tap and increased attendance at their shows, the band members agreed on "Jacob Fred Jazz Odyssey" as the band's new name. "Jazz Odyssey" came from a scene in Spinal Tap and "Jacob Fred" was what Haas wanted his unborn brother to be named at age 3.

== History and classifications ==
Originating in Tulsa, Oklahoma as an octet with a horn section in 1994, JFJO became a trio in the summer of 2000, initially performing as the Jacob Fred Trio in January 2000. Drummer Matthew Edwards left the group in early 2001; his replacement was Richard Haas, the brother of Brian, who performed with the group until October 2001. Jason Smart joined in late October 2001, becoming a member of the band until 2007. After Smart's departure, in June 2007, it was announced that Josh Raymer would be replacing Smart on drums. They have toured North America and Europe extensively and shared the stage with Medeski, Martin and Wood, Bill Frisell, Les Claypool, Scott Amendola, Charlie Hunter, Al Di Meola, Stanton Moore, John Scofield, Galactic, moe., Bonerama, Marco Benevento, Joe Russo, Kirk Joseph, The Dirty Dozen Brass Band, Rebirth Brass Band, Mike Dillon, Skerik, Johnny Vidacovich, Karl Denson, Mike Clark, The Barr Brothers, Joseph "Zigaboo" Modileste, John Ellis, Bluetech, Eskmo, Welder, Vibesquad, Robin Eubanks, Marshall Allen, George Garzone, and Steve Kimock among others.

== 2004–2008 ==
In 2004 the band released Walking With Giants, their first album with noted producer Joel Dorn's Hyena Records. Noteworthy for being JFJO's first studio album to contain acoustic piano, Walking With Giants was also the band's first studio album since 2000's Self is Gone.

2005 saw the release of their second album under Dorn and Hyena, The Sameness of Difference, the first release to include JFJO's uniquely arranged covers of songs by diverse contemporary musicians such as Björk and The Flaming Lips, as well as Dave Brubeck, Charles Mingus, Jimi Hendrix, Brian Wilson, and Neil Young. It also features original compositions by Haas, Smart and Mathis. In 2005 the band also released 4 Improvisations For The Ghosts, an almost ambient collection of live spontaneous music. In 2006 JFJO also put out the live compilation Tomorrow We'll Know Today: Live in USA and Europe as an online-only release.

The Fred toured little in 2007, as they spent a large amount of time working on their next record in the studio. Drummer Josh Raymer joined the band in June 2007, immediately getting his feet wet at Freihofer's Jazz Festival in Saratoga Springs, New York amongst others. The same year a live sampler of material from the September tour of 2007 was released as an online-only free EP under the title Rich Mahogany.

2008 found the band touring predominantly as a quartet behind their 2008 Hyena release Lil' Tae Rides Again, which was released in April of that year. Lil' Tae is considered a departure for JFJO, as it contains many electronic elements. The band recorded the rough tracks for Lil' Tae, then asked friend of the band and electronic music producer Tae Meyulks to remix the tracks to his liking—hence the album title Lil' Tae Rides Again.

Following the album's release, JFJO took Meyulks' creations and transcribed them for live performance, performing the album in its entirety night after night during a spring 2008 tour. An official live version, Lil' Tae Rides Again / Live, was compiled and edited by the band, combining performances from Portland, Denver, and Tulsa, and released as a digital download available through several online vendors.

During the 2008 tours, the quartet lineup shifted depending on the tour, and was either Haas/Raymer/Mathis/Tomshany or Haas/Raymer/Combs/Tomshany. The band performed high-profile shows at venues such as the JVC Jazz Festival in Newport, Rhode Island and Lincoln Center in NYC. In October 2008 the band returned to Europe as a trio (Haas/Mathis/Raymer). The tour brought great acclaim including a Guinness Jazz Award for Best New Band at the Cork Jazz Festival. This tour would prove to be the last full tour with founding member Mathis, who left to "pursue other musical endeavors." Two other trio shows were played on December 5 and 6. 2008 ended with a special New Year's Eve show in Tulsa, Oklahoma, where the band played their own set as well as a 'superjam' set with members of Callupsie & The Doldrums featuring the music of Michael Jackson, Prince, and Lionel Richie.

== 2009–2013 ==
In a March 2009 interview, Brian Haas explained:

"It's real simple stuff‚ obvious stuff. Reed [Mathis] and I didn't have any drama. We were just tired of being around each other and tired of playing with each other. Zero drama and zero discussions. He and I both had the same idea on the same day—he wasn't fired and he didn't leave. It was a mutual thing that we communicated to each other on the same day‚ and we never looked back."

The lineup of Haas/Raymer/Hayes/Combs made its debut at the NYC Winter Jazz Festival on January 10, 2009 to a packed house at Kenny's Castaways in New York City.

In early 2009, Jacob Fred formed their own record label, named Kinnara Records. The name Kinnara was chosen due to the members' strong identification with Buddhist and Hindu ideals. The half-bird, half-woman goddess Kinnara is representative of beauty, grace and accomplishment, and translates to "heavenly music" in Sanskrit.

On July 17, 2009, JFJO announced a cluster of seven nights in which they would be opening for Phish bassist Mike Gordon. The tour ran through venues in the Midwest, New England, and Ontario.

Jacob Fred Jazz Odyssey were winners of the 8th annual Independent Music Awards Vox Pop vote for best New Age Album Lil' Tae Rides Again.

The first half of 2010 found JFJO touring the West and East Coasts in the States, as well as the entire month of March in Europe. In April the band announced that they were parting ways with bassist Matt Hayes and would be bringing on Kansas City resident Jeff Harshbarger as their new double bassist. Harshbarger made his JFJO debut on April 17 with two consecutive performances for Record Store Day and the release of the 7" vinyl single "The Sensation of Seeing Light".

The band also released their 20th album, Stay Gold, as CD and double vinyl on June 22. In support of the release the band toured with the new quartet lineup in June including dates at the Rochester International Jazz Festival and the Massachusetts Museum of Contemporary Art. The band has further plans for touring in September and October 2010 stretching from New Orleans to Louisville to Seattle to LA.

In early 2011, the group recorded The Race Riot Suite, about the Tulsa race massacre of 1921, at Tulsa's Church Studio.

== 2013–present ==
In Summer 2013, Brian Haas, Josh Raymer, and Chris Combs began performing as a trio; Haas effectively became the band's bassist, now using a Moog bass keyboard to his left atop the piano. During this time, the band reworked material dating back to 1994, and in November 2013 recorded the album Millions: Live in Denver at DazzleJazz in Denver, CO. This vinyl-only endeavor enjoyed a sold-out release for Record Store Day 2014. The band had a successful American tour in support of this record from March 19 to June 21 of 2014.

JFJO's second release of 2014 and 26th album, Worker, came out in October 2014 from label Royal Potato Family. It features strong electronic sound influences. The band toured to support the album, including a show at the famous Snug Harbor jazz club in New Orleans, Louisiana.

== Members ==
- Brian Haas – piano, Fender Rhodes, Moog bass, synth, melodica (1994–present)
- Chris Combs – electric guitar, lap steel guitar synth (2008–present)
- Joshua Raymer – drums (2007–present)

Past members

- Jeff Harshbarger – double bass, (2010–2013)
- Mark Southerland – saxophone, homemade horns (2012–2013)
- Dove McHargue – electric guitar, vocals (1994–2000)
- Kyle Wright – trumpet (1994–2000)
- Matt Leland – trombone, vocals (1994–1999)
- Rod Mackey – tenor saxophone (1994–1995)
- Sean Layton – drums, percussion, vocals (1994–1999)
- Matthew Edwards – percussion (1994–1999), drums (1999–2001)
- Richard Haas – drums (2001)
- Jason Smart – drums (2001–2007)
- Peter Tomshany – electric guitar (2008)
- Reed Mathis – Fender jazz bass, double bass (1994–2008)
- Matt Hayes – double bass, (2009–2010)

== Discography ==
JFJO has released 26 albums in their 20-year history. The band has their own Sony/MRI/RED imprint, Kinnara Records, in partnership with Brooklyn-based Royal Potato Family. JFJO frequently releases free audio recordings of live shows for download on their official website, www.jfjo.com.

Album information
Worker
- Released: October 2014
Millions: Live In Denver
- Released: April 2014
The Race Riot Suite: A.Solo Piano - B.Solo Piano Remixed
- Released: February 2012
The Race Riot Suite
- Released: August 2011
Stay Gold
- Released: June 2010
The Sensation of Seeing Light [7" vinyl single]
- Released: April 2010
One Day in Brooklyn [EP]
- Release: September 2009
Winterwood
- Released: January 2009
Lil' Tae Rides Again: LIVE
- Released: 2008
- Availability: Available exclusively from digital retailers
- Live electronica version of the 2008 album.
Lil' Tae Rides Again
- Released: April 2008
Rich Mahogany [EP]
- Released: Fall 2007
- Availability: Available exclusively online (free download)
- Free live sampler of material from the September 2007 tour.
- Released on CD in 2008 by Hyena Records
Tomorrow We'll Know Today: Live in USA and Europe
- Released: 2006
- Availability: Available exclusively from digital retailers
The Sameness of Difference
- Released: 2006
4 Improvisations For The Ghosts
- Released: 2005
- Availability: Available exclusively from digital retailers
- For the Ghosts is a collection of live spontaneous music in tribute to the Supernatural.
Walking With Giants
- Released: 2004
Symbiosis Osmosis
- Released: 2003
- Availability: Online & Selected Retailers
Slow Breath, Silent Mind
- Released: 2003
- Availability: Online & Selected Retailers
Telluride is Acoustic
- Released: 2002
All Is One: Live in New York City
- Released: 2002
Self Is Gone
- Released: 2000
Bloom
- Released: 2000
- Availability: Out of print
- A JFJO retrospective from 1996-1998.
Live At Your Mama's House
- Released: 2000
- Availability: Out of print
Sean Layton: A Musical Retrospective
- Released: 1998-1999
- Availability: Out of print
Welcome Home
- Released: 1998
- Availability: Out of print
- JFJO's first album on a national record label, Accurate Records, Welcome Home received strong reviews ("Rookies of the Year!" - Signal to Noise)
Live In Tokyo
- Released: 1996
- Availability: Out of print
Live At The Lincoln Continental
- Released: 1995
- Availability: Out of print
