= Emphasizer =

Studio album by Garage A Trois
- Released: April 22, 2003
- Recorded: Piety Street Recording, New Orleans, Louisiana
- Length: 42:54
- Label: Tone-Cool
- Producer: Garage a Trois, Mike Napolitano

Garage A Trois chronology
Mysteryfunk (1999)	Emphasizer (2003)	Outre Mer (2005)

Professional ratings
Review scores
Source	Rating
Allmusic	4/5 stars
All About Jazz	(not rated)

Emphasizer is the first full-length studio album by Garage A Trois released in 2003.

== Track listing ==
1. "Hard Headed Rio AKA Rio Cuca Dura" - 4:14
2. "Sprung Monkey" - 4:39
3. "Plena for My Grundle" - 3:40
4. "A-Frame" - 3:56
5. "We See" - 3:53
6. "Interpretive Ape Dance" - 6:16
7. "Launch" - 5:02
8. "GAT Swamba" - 3:04
9. "Delta Skelta" - 5:18
10. "House of Hand Wash" - 2:51

Earlier albums have a different ordering with Gat Swamba on track 1, Sprung Monkey on track 6, and Interpretive Ape Dance on track 8.

== Personnel ==
- Mike Dillon: percussion, vibraphone, marimba, congas, tabla, timbales, gong, bells, cuica, effects
- Charlie Hunter: 8 string guitar, pandeiro
- Stanton Moore: drums and cymbals
- Skerik: tenor saxophone, baritone saxophone, suona double reed horn, drum, cracklebox, analog synth, effects, distortion, marimba
