= Expatriape =

Studio album by Hairy Apes BMX
- Released: 1999
- Recorded: by David Willingham at 70 Hurtz, Denton, Texas
- Genre: Experimental, funk, rock
- Label: Artist Workshop, V&R Record Co.
- Producer: HABMX, Nicholas Gordon

Hairy Apes BMX chronology
Expatriape (1999)	Out Demons (2000)

Professional ratings
Review scores
Source	Rating
AllMusic	3/5 stars

Expatriape is the first album by Hairy Apes BMX, released 1999.

== Musicians ==
- Mike Dillon - vibraphone, percussion, vocals
- Zac Baird - keyboards, vocals
- John Speice - drums, percussion
- J.J. Richards - bass, vocals

== Guest musicians ==
- David Carroll - congas (tracks 2, 3)
- DJ Nature - turntable (track 1)
- Skerik - saxophone (tracks 5, 8)
- Joe Cripps - congas (track 1)

== Track listing ==
1. Relapse King (Dillon, HABMX)
2. $100 (Dillon, Quinn)
3. Her Smile Unloads (Baird)
4. Jimmy Hat (Richards)
5. Fang (HABMX)
6. Situboquita Fuera (Cumbia)
7. My Tribe (Dillon)
8. Millennium Madness (Hooten, HABMX)
9. Breakfast (Dillon)
