= Medicine Hat (disambiguation) =

Medicine Hat is a city in Alberta, Canada.

Medicine Hat may also refer to:

== Places ==
- Cypress-Medicine Hat, a provincial electoral district since 1993
- Medicine Hat (federal electoral district), a federal electoral district since 1908
- Medicine Hat (N.W.T. electoral district), a territorial electoral district from 1888 to 1905
- Medicine Hat (provincial electoral district), a provincial electoral district since 1905
- Brooks-Medicine Hat, a provincial electoral district
- Medicine Hat—Cardston—Warner, a federal district in Alberta, Canada
- Medicine Hat Regional Hospital, a medical facility in Medicine Hat, Alberta, Canada
- Medicine Hat Arena, a multi-purpose arena in Medicine Hat, Alberta, Canada
- Medicine Hat railway station, a railway station in Medicine Hat, Alberta, Canada
- Medicine Hat/Schlenker Airport, an airport near Medicine Hat, Alberta, Canada
- Medicine Hat Airport, an airport southwest of Medicine Hat, Alberta, Canada
- Medicine Hat Ocean, a historic ocean

== Education & Associated Institutions ==
- Medicine Hat School District No. 76, a public school board in Medicine Hat, Alberta, Canada
- Medicine Hat High School, a high school in Medicine Hat, Alberta, Canada
- Medicine Hat College, a public college in southeastern Alberta and southwestern Saskatchewan, Canada

== Arts & Literature ==
- Medicine Hat (band), a rock band from Seattle, Washington

== Other ==
- HMCS Medicine Hat, a minesweeper that served during WWII for Canada
- City of Medicine Hat (sternwheeler), a sternwheeler from Medicine Hat, Alberta, Canada
