= Aja West and Cheeba =

Aja West and Cheeba are funk musicians from the United States west coast. Aja West was born in 1976, and younger brother Cheeba was born May 8, 1979.

In 2005, the brothers released Flash and Snowball. The album won Jam Album of the Year at the Independent Music Awards.

Aja West and Cheeba are the founders of the Mackrosoft Records music label. Aja West is the leader and conductor of the funk group The Mackrosoft, and Cheeba is the leader of The Cheebacabra. Each brother plays in the other's band.

== Discography ==
- Flash & Snowball (2005, Mackrosoft)

=== Album history ===
Flash & Snowball was written in tribute to the two cats the artists grew up with, one of which was deaf but enjoyed "listening" to music.
