= The Coalition of the Willing (album) =

Studio album by Bobby Previte
- Released: May 2006
- Recorded: July through September 2005
- Genre: Avant-garde jazz Jazz fusion Free funk
- Length: 47:06
- Label: Ropeadope Records

Professional ratings
Review scores
Source	Rating
Allmusic	4.5/5 stars
The Penguin Guide to Jazz Recordings	3.5/4 stars

The Coalition of the Willing is the 2006 album by drummer Bobby Previte. It combines elements of both jazz and classic rock. Featured artists include Charlie Hunter on guitar, Steve Bernstein on trumpet, Jamie Saft on the Hammond organ and Skerik on saxophone. Although Hunter is mostly known for his unique eight-string guitar work, he uses a regular six-string guitar on the album. Previte toured Europe and North America in support of the album.

== Musicians ==
- Bobby Previte - Drums & Percussion
- Charlie Hunter - Electric Guitars, Electric Basses
- Steve Bernstein - Trumpet, Slide Trumpet
- Jamie Saft - Organ, Mellotron, Moog, Electric Guitars, Electric Basses
- Skerik - Tenor and Baritone Saxophones
- Stanton Moore - Drums
- Stew Cutler - Harmonica, Slide Guitar

== Tracks ==
1. "The Ministry of Truth" - 5:16
2. "Airstrip One" - 4:45
3. "Versificator" - 6:09
4. "The Ministry of Love" - 5:50
5. "Oceania" - 5:07
6. "The Inner Party" - 5:56
7. "Memory Hole" - 7:54
8. "Anthem for Andrea" - 6:09

== See also ==
The Coalition of the Willing (band)
