= Garage A Trois =

American jazz quartet

- Garage A Trois at Tipitina's with Mean Willie Green sitting in on drums on April 28, 2004

Background information
- Origin: New Orleans, Louisiana
- Genres: Jazz
- Years active: 1998–present
- Labels: Fog City, Telarc
- Members: Skerik; Stanton Moore; Charlie Hunter
- Past members: Marco Benevento; Mike Dillon
- Website: garageatrois.com

Garage A Trois is an American jazz quartet including drummer Stanton Moore, saxophonist Skerik, vibraphone and percussionist Mike Dillon and keyboardist Marco Benevento. They play a variety of music including rock, funk and jazz.

== History ==
Garage A Trois was originally a trio founded by Moore, eight-string guitarist Charlie Hunter, and Skerik. It formed during the 1998 recording of Stanton Moore's debut All Kooked Out!, a session that also yielded Garage A Trois' debut recording Mysteryfunk. Both albums were produced by Dan Prothero on his independent Fog City Records label. They were also both recorded "live with no over dubs". Whereas All Kooked Out! was rehearsed, "straight-toned" and promoted as the initial release, Mysteryfunk was mostly improvised with electronically effected instruments and as Moore has stated had "all the freaky stuff."

After success as a live act they took on vibraphonist and percussionist Mike Dillon. The quartet performed multiple tours on the national nightclub circuit and played at several festivals. They were known to perform a wide variety of music in any given show including funk, punk-rock with electronic effects, or straightforward jazz.

In 2007, Moore, Skerik and Dillon continued to perform by the Garage A Trois moniker featuring other musicians such as John Medeski and Marco Benevento.

In October 2009, Garage A Trois released their first studio CD with the Benevento line-up, Power Patriot.

On August 20, 2012, Garage A Trois played a show at the Brooklyn Bowl in New York, with a lineup consisting of just Charlie Hunter, Skerik and Mike Dillon. The show is notable for the return of Charlie Hunter, the lack of Benevento or Moore, and Dillon playing a traditional drum kit for most of the show.

== Discography ==
- Mysteryfunk (Fog City, 1999)
- Emphasizer (Tone-Cool, 2003)
- Outre Mer (Telarc, 2005)
- Power Patriot (Royal Potato Family, 2009)
- Always Be Happy, But Stay Evil (Royal Potato Family, 2011)
- Calm Down Cologne (Royal Potato Family, 2021)
