= Romance (Dave Palmer album) =

Studio album by Dave Palmer
- Released: 2006
- Recorded: by Ethan Johns
- Genre: Jazz
- Length: 36:30
- Label: Three Crows Music

Romance is a solo album by session keyboardist Dave Palmer. The album has seven piano solo tracks and two tracks, which are a trio of piano, drums and bass. The music is self described as "at once somber and beautiful, melancholy and hopeful." The piano is a "Blüthner Grand from the early 1900s."

== Track listing ==
All tracks are written by Dave Palmer except as noted.

No.	Title	Writer(s)	Length
1.	"Romance #1"		2:08
2.	"6/8"		1:59
3.	"For My Love"		3:49
4.	"Romance #3"		3:39
5.	"Improv #1"		2:30
6.	"Monk's Mood"	Thelonious Monk	5:12
7.	"Big Black Car"	William Chilton	4:15
8.	"Lonely Woman"	Horace Silver	4:11
9.	"Ida Lupino"	Carla Bley	6:28
10.	"Peace"	Horace Silver	2:11

== Musicians ==
- Dave Palmer - piano
- Ethan Johns - drums
- Edwin Livingstone - bass
