= Battery Milk =

Studio album by Mike Dillon's Go-Go Jungle
- Released: 2007
- Genre: Experimental, jazz, funk
- Length: 54:06
- Label: Hyena Records

Professional ratings
Review scores
| Source | Rating |
|---|---|
| All About Jazz | link |

Battery Milk is the first album by Mike Dillon's Go-Go Jungle. The album includes experimental, funk and jazz.

== Musicians ==
- Go-Go Ray - drums
- JJ Jungle - bass, vocals
- Ron Johnson - bass
- Mike Dillon - vibraphone, tabla, percussion, vocals
- Mark Southerland - saxophone, eight track, bent circuits

== Track listing ==
1. "Go-Go's Theme"
2. "Broc's Last Stand"
3. "The Blame Game"
4. "Robbing the Bank"
5. "Your Mother Was My Teacher"
6. "The Voyeur"
7. "Lunatic Express"
8. "Hercules"
9. "Lopsided Melon Ball"
10. "Stupid Americans"
11. "Bad Man"
12. "Harris County"
