= Husky (album) =

Studio album by Skerik's Syncopated Taint Septet
- Released: 2006
- Recorded: by S."Husky" Höskulds at The Sound Factory in Los Angeles, California March 1, 2004; live sound engineering by Randall Dunn
- Genre: Jazz, Funk
- Length: 67:34
- Label: Hyena Records
- Producer: Skerik

Skerik's Syncopated Taint Septet chronology
Skerik's Syncopated Taint Septet (2002)	Husky (2006)	Live at The Triple Door (2010)

Professional ratings
Review scores
Source	Rating
All About Jazz	
Jazz Times	
Allmusic Jeff Tamarkin	

Husky is a studio album by Skerik's Syncopated Taint Septet released 2006. It was recorded at the Sound Factory in Los Angeles, California March 2004. Much of the recording is first takes. Skerik talks about recording the album:

"For me, Husky is that rare combination of everything lining up perfectly at the right time. You're lucky if you get one of these in a lifetime. The band had been on the road touring, so we knew the music inside out. We had a day off in Los Angeles, so we went into The Sound Factory, which is a one-of-a-kind studio out there and cut the entire record that day."

The album received favorable reviews.

== Musicians ==
- Craig Flory – baritone saxophone and clarinet
- Hans Teuber – alto saxophone, flute
- Steve Moore – trombone, Wurlitzer electric piano
- Joe Doria – Hammond organ
- Dave Carter – trumpet
- Skerik – tenor and baritone saxophone
- John Wicks – drums
- Isalee Teuber – vocal on "Daddy Won't Taint Bye-Bye"

== Track listing ==
1. "The Third Rail" (Steve Moore)
2. "Go to Hell, Mr Bush" (Hans Teuber)
3. "Syncopate the Taint" (Steve Moore)
4. "Fry His Ass" (Joe Doria)
5. "Don't Wanna" (Hans Teuber)
6. "Song for Bad" (Hans Teuber)
7. "Taming the Shrew" (Steve Moore)
8. "Irritaint" (Hans Teuber)
9. "Summer Pudding" (Hans Teuber)
10. "Daddy Won't Taint Bye-Bye" (Steve Moore)
