= Hell with the Lid Off =

Hell With the Lid Off

Studio album by MC 900 Ft. Jesus
- Released: 1990
- Genres: Hip-hop, Industrial, Acid jazz
- Length: 57:35
- Label: Nettwerk
- Producer: MC 900 Ft. Jesus

MC 900 Ft. Jesus chronology
Hell With the Lid Off (1990)	Welcome to My Dream (1991)

Professional ratings
Review scores
Source	Rating
AllMusic	4/5 stars

Hell With the Lid Off, released in 1990 (see 1990 in music), is the first album by MC 900 Ft. Jesus collaborating with DJ Zero (see MC 900 Ft. Jesus § Career).

Hell With the Lid Off was released on Nettwerk Music Group. It has a heaven-and-hell theme to it, and track titles repeatedly mention such topics as God, heaven, and angels. The songs themselves are often about mental illness, UFOs, voodoo, and violence; the comic delivery and tongue-in-cheek lyrics put this far outside the norm for a typical Nettwerk release. The album is sample-laden and has a hip-hop feel to it, though it shares little with that genre either.

== Track listing ==
(all songs written by Griffin, except where noted)

1. "A Greater God" – 2:52 (Chaney/Chaney)
2. "Real Black Angel" – 4:21
3. "Truth is Out of Style" – 5:43
4. "UFO's Are Real" – 5:21
5. "Shut Up" – 5:42
6. "I'm Going Straight to Heaven" – 4:03
7. "Spaceman" – 6:55
8. "Talking to the Spirits" – 6:31
9. "Too Bad" – 5:33
10. "A Place of Loneliness" – 0:47
11. "Born with Monkey Asses" ^ – 5:43
12. "Straight to Heaven" (instrumental) ^ – 4:04

^ CD-only bonus tracks
