= Skerik's Syncopated Taint Septet (album) =

Live album by Skerik's Syncopated Taint Septet
- Released: 2003
- Recorded: Live by Mell Dettmer at the Owl & Thistle in Seattle, Washington
- Genre: Jazz Funk
- Length: 63:23
- Label: Ropeadope Records
- Producer: Skerik

Skerik's Syncopated Taint Septet chronology
| Skerik's Syncopated Taint Septet (2003) | Husky (2006) |

Professional ratings
Review scores
| Source | Rating |
|---|---|
| All About Jazz | not rated |
| Allmusic | 4/5 stars |

Skerik's Syncopated Taint Septet is a self-titled first album recorded live in September 2002 in Seattle, Washington. It was recorded at the venue Owl & Thistle. The album received favorable reviews and while self described as "punk jazz" it also includes New Orleans influenced funk, bebop/hip-hop and rock crossing "time and musical culture without affectation, or worry."

== Track listing ==
1. "Freakus Piniatus"
2. "Philadelphia"
3. "Let Me Be Your Voodoo Doll"
4. "Runnin' Away"
5. "Too Many Toys"
6. "Bus Barn"
7. "Christina"
8. "They Did What to You?"
9. "Morphine"

== Musicians ==
- Joe Doria – Hammond organ
- John Wicks – drums
- Steve Moore – trombone, Wurlitzer electric piano
- Hans Teuber – alto saxophone, flute
- Dave Carter – trumpet
- Craig Flory – baritone saxophone
- Skerik – tenor and baritone saxophone
