= Skerik's Syncopated Taint Septet =

US musical group

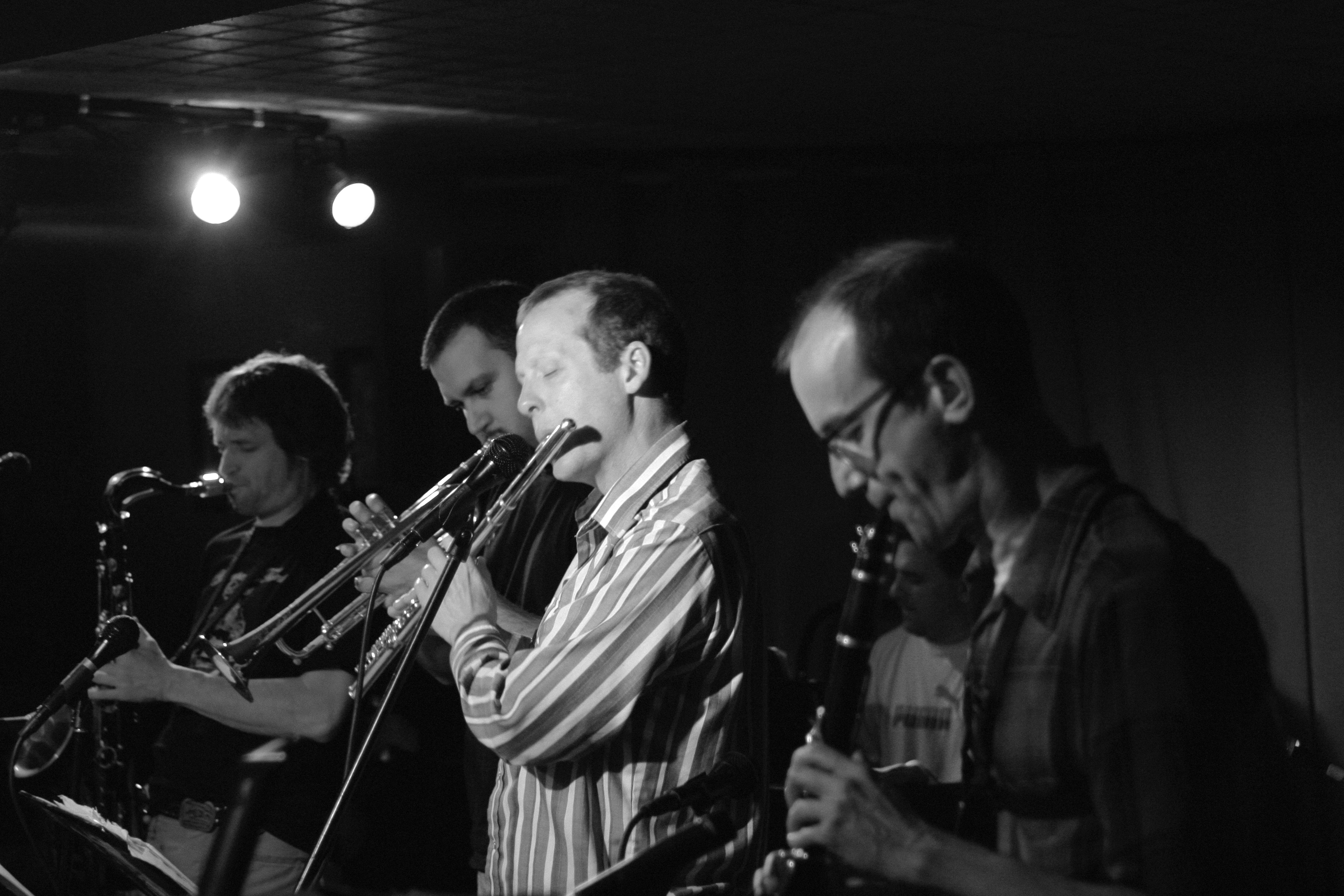
- Skerik's Syncopated Taint Septet, Portland, Oregon, June 25, 2005. Viewed left to right: Skerik, Dave Carter, Hans Teuber, Craig Flory

Background information
- Origin: Seattle, Washington, USA
- Genres: Punk jazz, punk funk, funk rock, jazz, funk, jazz-funk
- Years active: 2002–present
- Labels: Ropeadope Records, Hyena Records
- Members: Skerik; Dave Carter; Hans Teuber; Steve Moore; Craig Flory; Joe Doria; John Wicks

Skerik's Syncopated Taint Septet (also known as SST7) is a jazz ensemble formed in Seattle, Washington, in 2002 and led by saxophonist Eric "Skerik" Walton.

== Music ==
Although uniquely merging jazz and funk, the music of Skerik's Syncopated Taint Septet can also include "New Orleans flavors", solid grooves, swing and hip hop, combined into something both appealing and undefinable. Their music has been self-described by Skerik as "punk-jazz. Maybe a punk-jazz version of the Thelonious Monk Octet."

A theme in the music is a recognition that traditional jazz having reached a zenith in the early 1960s cannot be contained in reverence. The Syncopated Taint Septet is a synthesis of traditional music with current and experimental music forms. The project displays a band member equality with "leads being shared by everyone."

== History ==
Their first album, Skerik's Syncopated Taint Septet, was recorded live at the Owl and Thistle in Seattle and was released in 2003. It was reviewed as occasionally loud, yet also having a "spirited [and] immediate musicianship." Although popularly associated with jam band music, an improvisational distinction can be made regarding the large musical vocabulary displayed by the band in the recording.

The second album, Husky, was released in 2006. It was recorded in the studio by S. Husky Höskulds all in one day and often in one take. The album was noted in reviews for its strengths in "ensemble writing and musical structure." The five-horn arrangements are written mostly by Hans Teuber and Steve Moore. On the album there are suggestions of Thelonious Monk in its solos and Ornette Coleman in its melodies, yet there is also a hip-hop rhythmic sensibility. Husky was reviewed as the best jazz album of 2006 by All About Jazz.

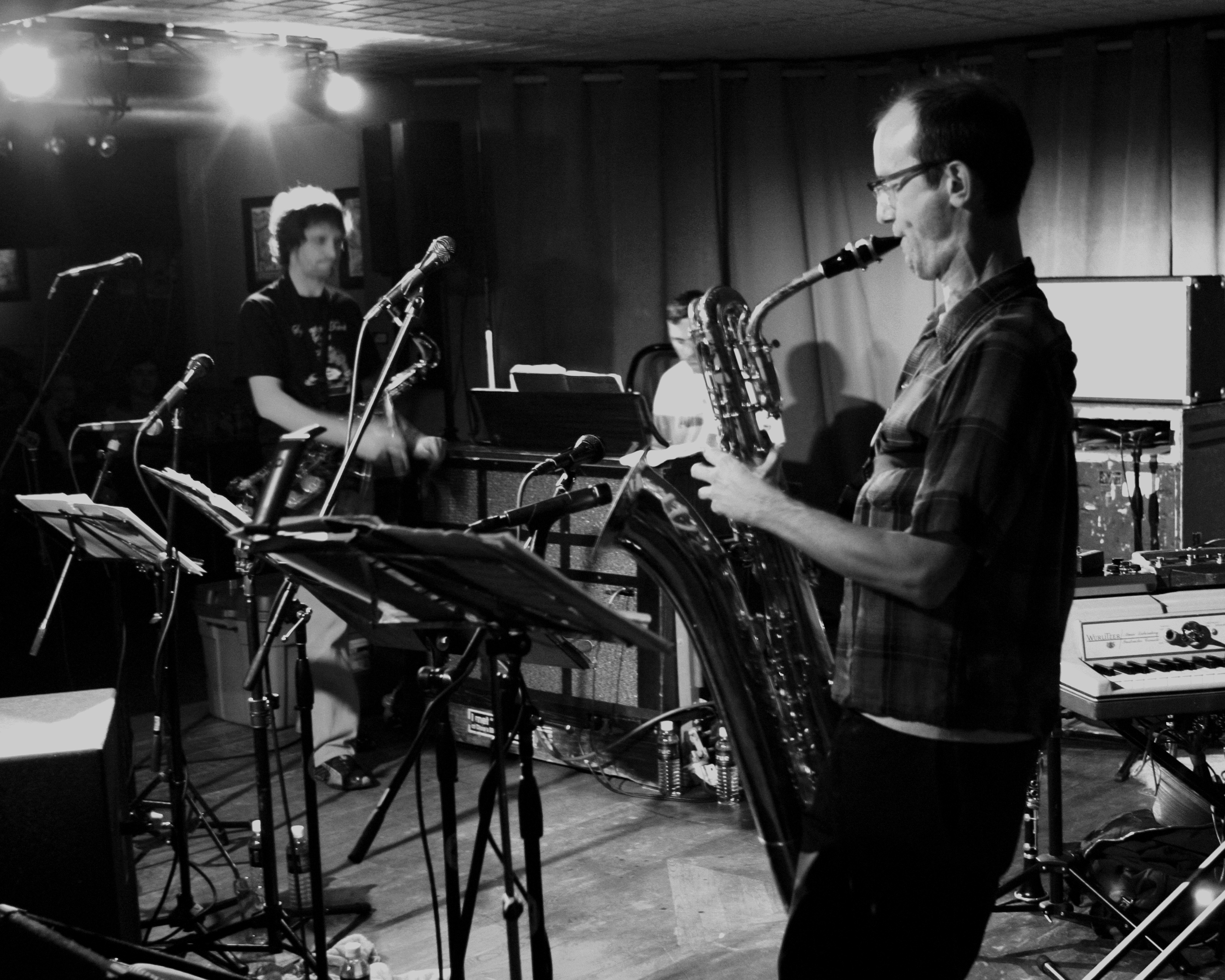
Skerik's Syncopated Taint Septet, Portland, Oregon, June 25, 2005. Viewed left to right: Skerik, Joe Doria, Craig Flory

== Members ==
Skerik – tenor and baritone saxophone
Dave Carter – trumpet
Hans Teuber – alto saxophone and flute
Steve Moore – trombone and Wurlitzer electric piano
Craig Flory – baritone saxophone and clarinet
Joe Doria – Hammond Organ
John Wicks – drums

== Discography ==
- Skerik's Syncopated Taint Septet [live] (2003, Ropeadope)
- Husky (2006, Hyena)
- Live at The Triple Door (2010, Royal Potato Family)
