= Live at The Triple Door (Skerik's Syncopated Taint Septet) =

Live album by Skerik's Syncopated Taint Septet
- Released: May 25, 2010
- Recorded: Mixed and mastered by Mell Dettmer
- Genre: Jazz, Funk
- Label: Royal Potato Family
- Producer: Kevin Calabro (of Hyena Records)

Skerik's Syncopated Taint Septet chronology
Husky (2006)	Live at The Triple Door (2010)

Live at The Triple Door is the third album by Skerik's Syncopated Taint Septet released 2010. It was recorded live at the venue The Triple Door in Seattle September 2003. Two tracks feature vocalist Om Johari (of Hell's Belles). Several tracks include string arrangements.

The Syncopated Taint performed the first night for the new opening of The Triple Door in Seattle in September 2003. They performed in white tie formal.

== Track listing ==
1. "Summer Pudding" (9:04) by Hans Teuber
2. "The Third Rail" (6:50) by Steve Moore
3. "Taming the Shrew" (9:12) by Steve Moore
4. "Mississippi Goddamn" (4:13) by Nina Simone
5. "The Mystery of Man" (4:29) by Francy Roland and Eugene Lees
6. "To More O's" (7:39) by Dave Carter
7. "Marriage of Days" (2:25) by Eyvind Kang

== Personnel ==
- Skerik - tenor saxophone
- Craig Flory - baritone saxophone, clarinet
- Hans Teuber - alto saxophone, flute
- Dave Carter - trumpet
- Steve Moore - trombone, electric piano, bells
- Joe Doria - Hammond Organ
- John Wicks - Drums

== Guest musicians ==
- Om Johari - vocals ("Mississippi Goddamn", "The Mystery of Man")
- Jen Kozel - violin
- Stephen Creswell - viola
- Gretchen Yanover - cello
- Eyvind Kang - additional viola, violin and string coach
