= Power Patriot =

Studio album by Garage A Trois
- Released: October 27, 2009
- Recorded: Recorded Mike Napolitano at Number C, New Orleans. Mixed and mastered by Mel Dettmar at Aleph Studios.
- Genre: jazz/rock
- Label: The Royal Potato Family

Garage A Trois chronology
Outre Mer (2005)	Power Patriot (2009)	Always Be Happy, But Stay Evil (2011)

Power Patriot is the third studio album by Garage A Trois. It is the first CD with the musician line-up that includes Stanton Moore, Skerik, Mike Dillon and Marco Benevento. It was released October 2009.

== Track listing ==
1. "Rescue Spreaders" (Benevento)
2. "Fragile" (Benevento)
3. "Dory's Day Out" (Dillon)
4. "Electric Door Bell Machine" (Dillon, Benevento, Skerik)
5. "Power Patriot" (Skerik)
6. "Dugout" (Dillon)
7. "Fat Redneck Gangster" (Dillon)
8. "Purgatory" (Skerik)
9. "Germs" (Dillon)
10. "Computer Crimes" (Dillon)

== Personnel ==
- Stanton Moore: drums
- Skerik: saxophone
- Mike Dillon: vibraphone
- Marco Benevento: keyboards
