= Welcome to My Dream =

Studio album by MC 900 Ft. Jesus
- Released: 1991
- Genres: Hip-hop, acid jazz
- Length: 41:46
- Label: Nettwerk
- Producer: MC 900 Ft. Jesus

MC 900 Ft. Jesus chronology
Hell with the Lid Off (1990)	Welcome to My Dream (1991)	One Step Ahead of the Spider (1994)

Welcome to My Dream is the second album by MC 900 Ft. Jesus. It was released in 1991 via Nettwerk.

The track "Falling Elevators" was featured in the 1996 Levi's commercial "Washroom," directed by Tarsem Singh. The song "Killer Inside Me" is inspired by the book The Killer Inside Me by pulp fiction writer Jim Thompson. U2 used a sample from "The City Sleeps" on the track "Daddy's Gonna Pay for Your Crashed Car" on their Zooropa album.

== Production ==
The album is credited to MC 900 Ft. Jesus alone, with DJ Zero's contributions listed under his own name, Patrick Rollins. The album was recorded in Dallas.

== Critical reception ==
Professional ratings
Review scores
Source	Rating
AllMusic	4/5 stars
MusicHound Rock: The Essential Album Guide	4/5 stars
Muzik	2/5 stars

Trouser Press wrote that the album "releases [MC 900 Ft. Jesus] from his growth-stunting reliance on technology, using a complement of competent live musicians to erect a rhythmically intricate, stylistically varied podium-noir jazz, percolating funk and jumped-up hip-hop are the fundamental struts — on which he recounts his troubled character studies." The Washington Post wrote that "900 Ft's signature sound ... is an industrial/jazz fusion that's pegged to rippling piano ('Falling Elevators') or wailing saxophone ('Killer Inside Me')."

== Track listing ==
1. "Falling Elevators" – 6:46
2. "Killer Inside Me" – 4:08
3. "Adventures in Failure" – 5:45
4. "The City Sleeps" – 5:29
5. "O-Zone" – 4:32
6. "Hearing Voices in One's Head" – 5:54
7. "Dali's Handgun" – 4:41
8. "Dancing Barefoot" – 4:31
