= The Coalition of the Willing (band) =

American musical group

- Genres: Jazz, Rock, Improvisation
- Years active: 2006 - present
- Label: Ropeadope
- Members: Bobby Previte - Drums & Percussion; Charlie Hunter - Electric Guitars, Electric Basses; Steven Bernstein - Trumpet, Slide Trumpet; Jamie Saft - Organ, Mellotron, Moog, Electric Guitars, Electric Basses; Skerik - Tenor and Baritone Saxophones; Stanton Moore - Drums; Stew Cutler - Harmonica, Slide Guitar; Marco Benevento - Organ, Electric Piano, Electronics; Robert Walter - Keyboards; Reed Mathis - Bass

The Coalition of the Willing is an instrumental jazz and rock ensemble led by Bobby Previte. Live performances are improvisational, emphasizing groove, experimental and cross-genres. Their self-titled album was released in 2006 (Ropeadope), and they began a tour in early 2006. The West Coast touring band had remained active through July 2007.

Album musician credits

- Bobby Previte - Drums & Percussion
- Charlie Hunter - Electric Guitars, Electric Basses
- Steven Bernstein - Trumpet, Slide Trumpet
- Jamie Saft - Organ, Mellotron, Moog, Electric Guitars, Electric Basses
- Skerik - Tenor and Baritone Saxophones
- Stanton Moore - Drums
- Stew Cutler - Harmonica, Slide Guitar

European touring band - Winter/Spring 2006

- Bobby Previte: drums
- Charlie Hunter: guitar
- Steven Bernstein: trumpet, slide trumpet
- Marco Benevento: organ, electric piano, electronics

USA touring band - Fall 2006

- Charlie Hunter - Skerik - Robert Walter - Bobby Previte

USA touring band - Winter 2007

- THE SEPARATION: Marco Benevento - Reed Mathis - Bobby Previte This performance was a collaboration with playwright/director Andrea Kleine, the early music choir "The Rose Ensemble" and visual artist Anna Kiraly. It was co-commissioned by and premiered at The Walker Art Center in Minneapolis, Minnesota February 2, 2007.
- WEST COAST TOUR: Reed Mathis - Brian Coogan - Skerik - Bobby Previte

== See also ==
- The Coalition of the Willing (album)
