= Brian Haas =

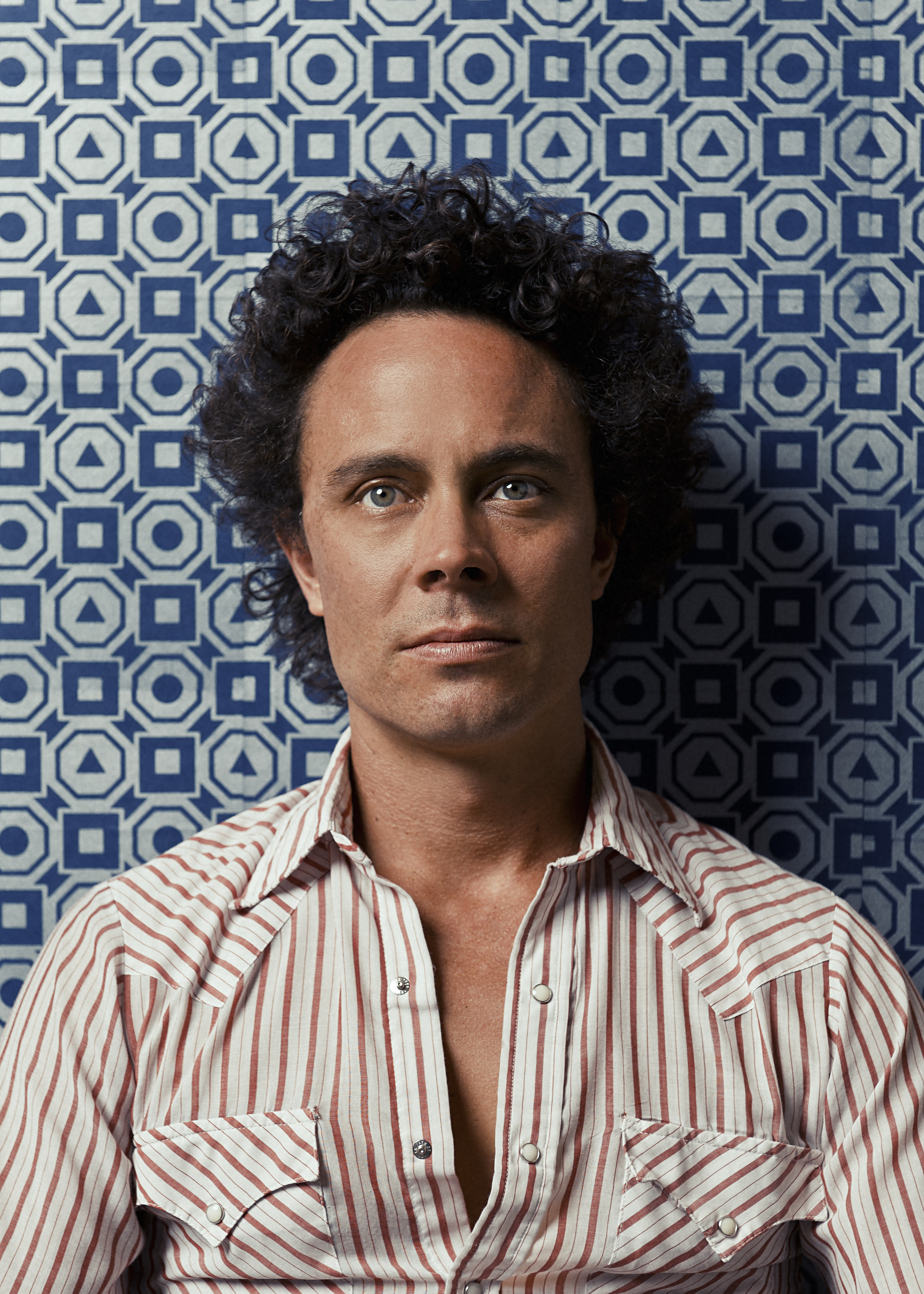

Background information
- Born: Brian Roy Haas; March 18, 1974 (age 52); Tulsa, Oklahoma
- Genres: Jazz, pop, rock
- Occupation: Musician
- Instrument: Piano
- Years active: 1994–present
- Label: Royal Potato Family
- Website: www.brianroyhaas.com

Brian Roy Haas (born March 18, 1974) is an American jazz pianist and founding member of the band Jacob Fred Jazz Odyssey.

Haas spent his formative years in Broken Arrow, Oklahoma, a suburb of Tulsa. He began studying classical piano at age five. He won local and regional piano competitions at a young age. When he was sixteen, he won the Oklahoma Concerto Competition. He performed with the Tulsa Philharmonic. After graduating from high school, he received a scholarship to study classical music at the University of Tulsa, but while in college he became interested in jazz and switched his major.

In January 2011 JFJO recorded a suite of music based on the Tulsa race massacre. Haas signed with Rykodisc/Hyena Records, which released his first album, The Truth About Hollywood (2005), a combination of Hass's compositions and cover versions of songs by Thelonious Monk.

Starting in 2016, Haas plays in the band Nolatet with Mike Dillon, James Singleton, and Johnny Vidacovich. He composes number of songs for the band including "Gracemont," "No Revenge Necessary," and "Lanky, Stanky, Maestro," a tribute to their drummer Vidacovich.

== Discography ==
Album information
Nolatet - No Revenge Necessary
- 2018
Brian Haas & Matt Chamberlain - Prometheus Risen
- 2016
Nolatet - Dogs
- 2016
JFJO - The Battle for Earth
- 2015
JFJO - Millions: Live in Denver
- 2014
JFJO - Worker
- 2014
Brian Haas & Matt Chamberlain - Frames
- October 2013
JFJO - The Race Riot Suite: A. Solo Piano - B. Solo Piano Remixed
- February 2012
JFJO - The Race Riot Suite
- August 2011
Stay Gold
- June 2010
JFJO - The Sensation of Seeing Light [7" vinyl single]
- April 2010
JFJO - One Day in Brooklyn [EP]
- September 2009
Brian Haas (solo) - Petting Sounds
- 2009
JFJO - Winterwood
- January 2009
JFJO - Lil' Tae Rides Again: LIVE
- 2008
JFJO - Lil' Tae Rides Again
- April 2008
JFJO - Rich Mahogany [EP]
- Fall 2007
JFJO - Tomorrow We'll Know Today: Live in USA and Europe
- 2006
JFJO - The Sameness of Difference
- 2006
Brian Haas (solo) - The Truth About Hollywood
- 2005
JFJO - 4 Improvisations for the Ghosts
- 2005
JFJO - Walking with Giants
- 2004
JFJO - Symbiosis Osmosis
- 2003
JFJO - Slow Breath, Silent Mind
- 2003
JFJO - Telluride is Acoustic
- 2002
JFJO - All Is One: Live in New York City
- 2002
JFJO - Self Is Gone
- 2000
JFJO - Bloom
- 2000
JFJO - Live at Your Mama's House
- 2000
JFJO - Sean Layton: A Musical Retrospective
- 1998-1999
JFJO - Welcome Home
- 1998
JFJO - Live in Tokyo
- 1996
JFJO - Live at the Lincoln Continental
- 1995
