= Ponga (band) =

American improvisational jazz band

- Origin: Seattle, Washington
- Genres: Free-improvisation, Jazz
- Years active: 1997–2001
- Labels: Loosegroove, P-Vine
- Members: Bobby Previte (drums); Skerik (saxophone); Wayne Horvitz (keyboards); Mike Gamble (guitars)
- Past members: Dave Palmer (keyboards)

Ponga is a Seattle-based improvisational quartet composed of Wayne Horvitz (keyboards), Bobby Previte (drums), Skerik (saxophone), and Mike Gamble (guitars). Ponga's performances and recordings were entirely improvised with no overdubs.

The quartet started in 1997 and upon their first self-titled release in 1999 toured North America, Europe and Japan to excellent reviews. Often described as "intuitive" with references to the electric bands led by Miles Davis in the late 1960s and 1970s, the group was also noted for styles that were all-encompassing. Reviews emphasize both aesthetic and technical expertise. The first album was followed by a release of Re-mixes by such notables as Fila Brazillia, Spacetime Continuum, and Amon Tobin containing more danceable beats. The last studio release Psychological like the first was recorded live and in part at the O.K. Hotel in Seattle. Along with their live performances it also received favorable reviews.

== Musicians ==
- Wayne Horvitz – keyboards
- Bobby Previte – drums
- Skerik – saxophone, samples
- Dave Palmer – keyboards

== Discography ==
- Ponga (Loosegroove 1998)
- The Ponga Remixes (Loosegroove 1999)
- Psychological (P-Vine 2000)
