= Ponga, Arkhangelsk Oblast =

Ponga Поньга
- Settlement
- Location within Arkhangelsk Oblast Location within Russia
- Coordinates: 63°45′N 38°04′E
- Country: Russia
- Region: Arkhangelsk Oblast
- District: Onezhsky District
- Time zone: UTC+3:00

Ponga (Russian: Поньга) is a rural locality (a settlement) in Nimengskoye Rural Settlement of Onezhsky District, Arkhangelsk Oblast, Russia. The population was 87 as of 2010. There are 8 streets.

== Geography ==
Ponga is located 15 km south of Onega (the district's administrative centre) by road. Shasta is the nearest rural locality.
