= Hairy Apes BMX =

- Origin: Austin, Texas
- Genres: Experimental rock, jazz rock, funk rock
- Years active: 1999 - present
- Members: Mike Dillon, John Speice, J.J. Richards, E. Clarke Wyatt

Hairy Apes BMX is an Austin, Texas, USA-based band playing an eclectic mix of rock, jazz, Latin, afro-funk, hip-hop, and punk. They won the Austin Regional Poll at The 1st Annual Independent Music Awards. According to Dillon, the band's name refers to humans all being "just a bunch of hairy apes" and BMX stands for "butt-moving experience".

== Current members ==
- Mike Dillon - vibraphone, percussion, vocals
- John Speice - drums, percussion
- J.J. Richards - bass, vocals
- E. Clarke Wyatt - keyboards

== Past members ==
- Dave Abbruzzese (formerly of Pearl Jam) - drums, keyboards, production
- Zac Baird - keyboards, vocals

== Discography ==
- Expatriape 1999
- Out Demons 2000
- Beautiful Seizure 2003
