= Stick Men with Ray Guns =

American punk rock group

- Origin: Dallas, Texas, United States
- Genres: Punk rock, noise rock
- Years active: 1981-1988
- Past members: Bobby Soxx; Clarke Blacker; Scott Elam; Bob Beeman; Valerie Bowles; Mark Ridlin
- Website: www.stickmenwithrayguns.com

Stick Men with Ray Guns was an American punk rock group from Dallas, Texas. The group's name comes from a comic that Bobby Soxx (Bobby Glenn Calverley) had created called "Stick Man with Ray Gun". The Stick Man was a crazed, racist character who walked the streets of his neighborhood blasting anyone with his raygun that he thought was defiling his race or just bugged him.

They formed in 1981 after lead singer Bobby Soxx (formerly of the Teenage Queers) attended a show by guitarist Clarke Backer's previous group, Bag of Wire. Their first show was a date at the Fort Worth club Zeros in spring 1981. Because of Bobby's reputation, Clarke often had to vouch for Bobby's behavior with club managers in the early days of the band. Close friends with members of the Butthole Surfers, they often shared the stage, each opening for the other until the Surfers began to tour nationally and gain popularity. They also opened on Texas dates for punk groups such as X, Dead Kennedys, T.S.O.L., The Misfits, Bad Brains, and UK Subs. They went on hiatus in 1987 and reconvened in 1988 to write new material; their last show was in June 1988.

The group was distinguished by their raucous and aggressive musical style which featured an incredibly loud, howling guitar and a thundering distorted bass, backed up with confrontational and offensive lyrics, and correspondingly Bobby's decadent lifestyle. Stick Men With Ray Guns was in many ways performance art, gleefully exploring violence and irrationality. Their sets were openly hostile or combative with the audience. They were completely unconcerned about what people thought of them. They often played unusual or intentionally irritating audio tapes prior to going on stage and sometimes experimented with annoying lighting effects if they had access to the lighting in a club. This seemingly self-destructive behavior was exaggerated whenever they played off their home turf of Dallas, often choosing to open sets out of town with songs they had never practiced.

Before the band started in 1981, Bobby Soxx was notorious for starting fights frequently, urinating on other groups during their shows, and inserting microphones into his anus before leaving the set. In fact, many of these aforementioned stage antics and others only happened once but their fame grew exponentially among the fans as time went on.

In its heyday, the group recorded little in the studio, Clarke once intentionally destroyed the master tapes from a particularly weak recording session, though a few rough mixes survived and have been reluctantly included on various releases. They never toured outside of Texas and were not well known beyond the regional punk scene. However, as interest in the early Texas punk scene increased over time, groups like Stick Men with Ray Guns and The Hugh Beaumont Experience acquired a cult status among punk fans. Stick Men became better known when the Richard Hell/Thurston Moore project, Dim Stars, covered their song "Christian Rat Attack".[correction Christian Rat Attack was not "their song". It was written by Bobby Soxx and Steve Dirkx, and performed /recorded with Bobby's First Band, The Teenage Queers] In 2000, guitarist Clarke Backer released 16 of their recordings on an album entitled Some People Deserve to Suffer. In 2002, the album was picked up, enlarged to 23 tracks, and re-released under the duel label of Emperor Jones/Drag City; the reissue received highly positive reviews from several major press agencies and was named the No. 6 in Mojo's Best Underground Albums of 2002 list.

After spending time in prison and a mental hospital, Bobby Soxx died of liver failure due to acute alcoholism on October 23, 2000.

As their notoriety has increased, both Clarke Blacker and Bob Beeman have participated in a number of in-depth interviews that have appeared online. Their Some People Deserve to Suffer album has now been re-released on the band's label, We Don't Have the Time Music, and is currently available for digital download worldwide. A second album, Rock Against Reagan - Live in Houston April 6, 1984, was released on May 15, 2014 and is now available for digital download as well.

On Thanksgiving weekend 2014, the well known Austin, Texas record store End of an Ear released the vinyl lp "Grave City" as their new End of an Ear label's debut record. The first pressing quickly sold out, and a second pressing was ordered in January, 2017. The second pressing has the record label reversed (white text on a black background) to differentiate the two pressings.

In September 2016 12XU held a simultaneous release of two live vinyl lp albums; "Property of Jesus Christ" and "1,000 Lives to Die", which featured newly restored live performances recorded at two shows in 1984 and 1987. These two records give the listener rather different, but intense performances by this controversial Texas band.

== Members ==
- Bobby Soxx (Bobby Glenn Calverley) - vocals
- Clarke Blacker - guitar
- Scott Elam - drums
- Bob Beeman - bass
- Valerie Bowles - bass (briefly)
- Mark Ridlin - bass (briefly)
