= The Cheebacabra =

Psychedelic funk fusion band

The Cheebacabra is a psychedelic funk fusion band on their own Mackrosoft Records label.

== Band members ==
- Cheeba- Drums, organ, piano, Fender Rhodes, synthesizer
- Danny Welsh- Flute, Sax
- Mark Adams- Guitar
- Farko Dosumov- Bass
- Zanchie Whitehead- Bass
- Nick Allison- Fender Rhodes
- Joe Doria- Hammond B-3 organ
- Alex Westcoat- Drums
- Johnny Conga- Percussion
- Anthony Warner- Synthesizers
- Bob Lovelace- Bass
- Jay Jaskot- Drums
- Ryan Braun- Trumpet
- Alex Veley- Clavinet, organ, Fender Rhodes
- Steve Black- Guitar
- Daniel Gould- Organ, saxophone, synthesizers
- Snakerythms- Saxophone
- Victor Tapia- Percussion
- Aja West- Drum fill, synthesizer, electric bass, cymbals
- Steve Moore- Synthesizer, piano
- Dave Carter- Trumpet
- Fred Roth- Electric bass
- Money Mark- Keyboards
- David Mullenova- Violin
- Peter Scherr- Upright bass
- Jason Vontver- Drums
- Kenny Mandell- Sax, Flute
- Mike Porcaro- Bass guitar

== Discography ==
=== Albums ===
- Metamorphosis (2003)
- Exile In The Woods (2006)
- Pass the Information (2012)
- Retouched (2015)
