= Joe Doria =

American keyboardist

- Joe Doria's McTuff, with Andy Coe & Dvonne Lewis

Background information
- Origin: Seattle, Washington
- Genres: jazz, funk, rock
- Instrument: Hammond Organ
- Member of: Skerik's Syncopated Taint Septet
- Website: http://www.joedoriamusic.com/

Joe Doria is an American Hammond Organ keyboardist from Seattle, Washington. Playing many styles, Doria has backed solo artists from the Seattle area and is a member of several Seattle based groups, some of which have toured nationally. These include McTuff and his own Joe Doria Trio, as well as The Drunken Masters, Skerik's Syncopated Taint Septet, AriSawkaDoria, Swampdweller and The Last Mile.

Doria has consistently received positive reviews. The Stranger praised him as "all solid... omni present... (and the) backbone holding it all down," and stated that he "never lets his immense chops get in the way of momentum or soul." All About Jazz says his "deft... tasteful roadhouse temperament never allows the pieces to veer off course."

Performances in the Fall of 2007 include The Joe Doria Trio with Chris Spencer on guitar, Byron Vannoy on drums, McTuff with Skerik on saxophone, Andy Coe on guitar and Dvonne Lewis on drums. Tarik Abouzied eventually joined McTuff, replacing Dvonne Lewis on drums.

== Discography ==
- 2003: Skerik's Syncopated Taint Septet [live] (Ropeadope)
- 2006: Skerik's Syncopated Taint Septet: Husky (Hyena)
- 2010: Skerik's Syncopated Taint Septet: Live at The Triple Door (Royal Potato Family)
- 2009: McTuff: Volume 1 (with Skerik) (Doria Music)
- 2011: McTuff: Volume 2 – After The Show (Doria Music)
- 2015: McTuff: Volume 3 – The Root (Doria Music)
- 2024: Nando Reis: Uma Estrela Misteriosa Revelará o Segredo (on "Rhipsalis") (Relicário)
