= OK Hotel =

Former bar and music venue

Coordinates: 47°36′1.48″N 122°20′6.70″W

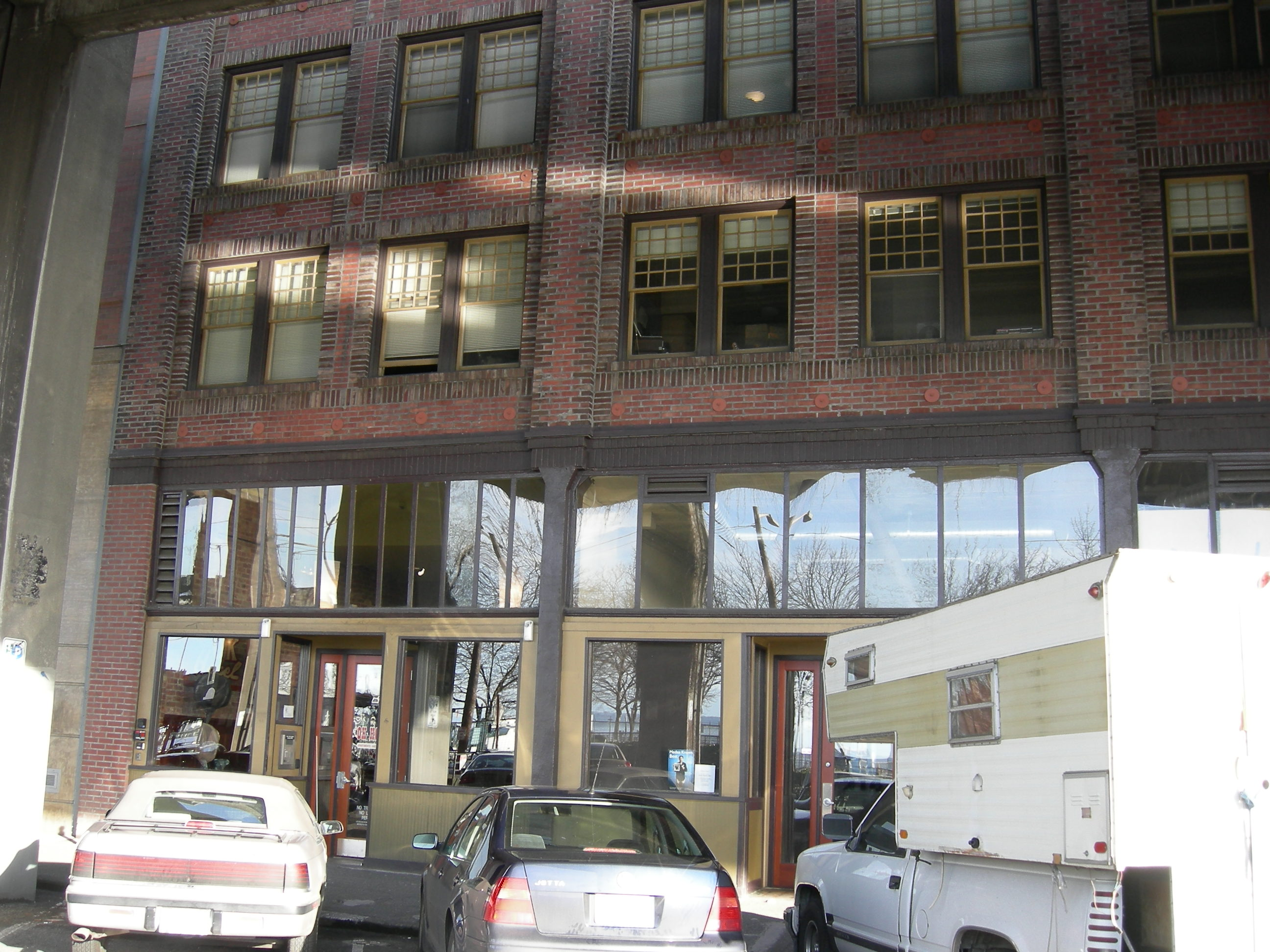
OK Hotel building 2008

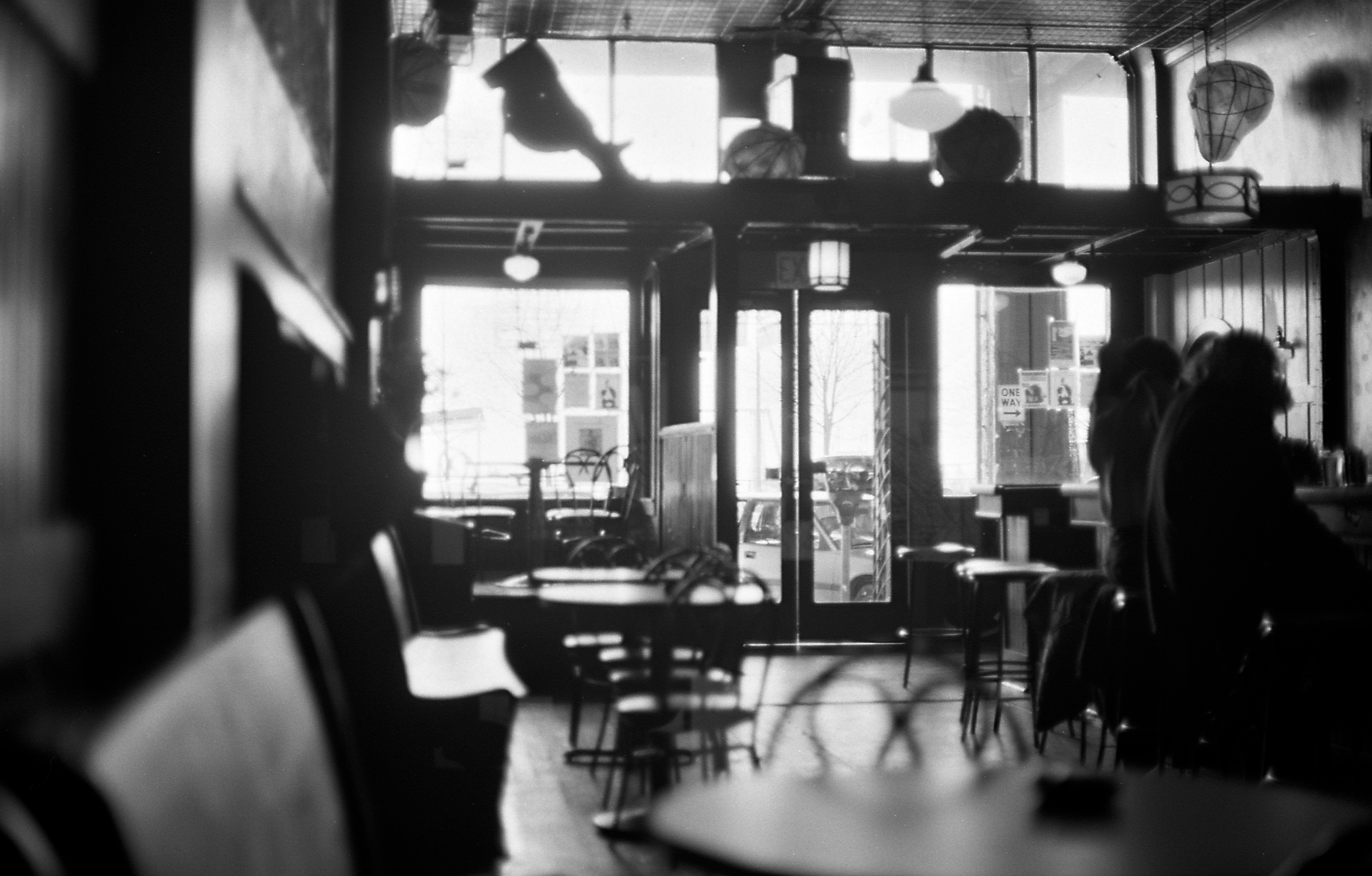
OK Hotel in 1997

The OK Hotel was an American bar and music venue located at 212 Alaskan Way South in Seattle's Pioneer Square district. It is now a location of low income units. The club's 15-year-plus life span came to an end with the Nisqually earthquake of February 28, 2001, which damaged numerous buildings in the historic district.

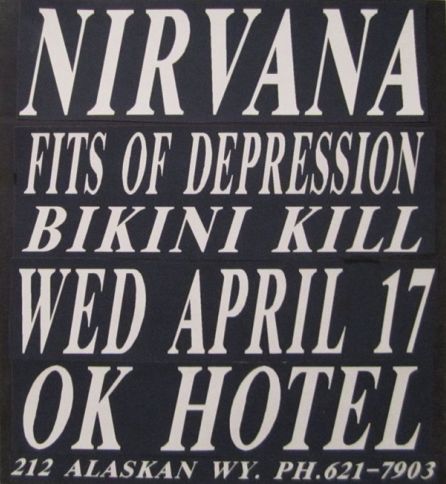
Poster for an April 17, 1991 show at the OK Hotel, featuring Bikini Kill and Nirvana

Most widely recognized as a prominent location in the movie Singles (1992), the OK Hotel was one of numerous active Seattle rock venues during the celebrated local scene of the late eighties. The first musical group to play live at the venue was local band Seers of Bavaria, featuring future bass player for pop-punk band Flop Paul Schurr on lead vocals. The club's debut headliner was Vexed, also from Seattle. Local bands such as Tad, Mother Love Bone, The U-Men, Screaming Trees, Green River (an early version of Mudhoney), Soundgarden, Bikini Kill, and Nirvana (including the first live performance of "Smells Like Teen Spirit" on April 17, 1991) played at the OK Hotel; as well as touring punk, rock, and continental jazz artists. It is mentioned in "Thanx", the last track on Sublime's debut album 40 Oz. to Freedom. It was also where Queens of the Stone Age played their first live show.

During the final years preceding the Earthquake, the OK Hotel had become a treasured home for Seattle's lively creative music culture, featuring artists Bill Frisell, Amy Denio, Robin Holcomb, Wayne Horvitz with Zony Mash and Ponga, the Living Daylights, Sweet Water, Medicine Hat, Black Cat Orchestra, and hip-hop group The Physics.

Renovation of the building was completed in 2004 as residential property with 42 living spaces and artist studios which are open to the public during First Thursday Artwalks.
