= Matt Chamberlain =

American drummer (born 1967)

- Born: April 17, 1967 (age 59); San Pedro, Los Angeles, California, U.S.
- Genres: Pop; alternative rock; punk rock; grunge; funk; jazz; electronic
- Occupation: Musician
- Instrument: Drums
- Years active: 1988–present
- Labels: Geffen; Loosegroove; Ropeadope Records; Kufala; Web of Mimicry; Blue Note
- Website: Official website

Matthew Chamberlain (born April 17, 1967) is an American drummer, record producer, and songwriter. He has worked as a session musician for a wide range of artists including Pearl Jam, David Bowie, Tori Amos, The Wallflowers, Elton John, Fiona Apple, Bob Dylan, Brandi Carlile, John Fogerty, Sarah McLachlan, and Soundgarden.

== Biography ==
Chamberlain was born in San Pedro, California on April 17, 1967. He began learning how to play the drums at age 15, taking lessons with Tower of Power drummer David Garibaldi. He enrolled at North Texas State University (now known as University of North Texas) to study music but left after less than a year. After leaving college, he moved to Dallas, Texas and played with numerous bands in the Deep Ellum music scene.

While in Texas, Chamberlain joined Edie Brickell & New Bohemians, and was the drummer on their 1990 album Ghost of a Dog. He was then recruited by Pearl Jam to assist with live performances after the departure of original drummer Dave Krusen. Chamberlain played with Pearl Jam for three weeks in mid-1991; he did not appear on any recordings but is pictured in the video for the song "Alive". He then left Pearl Jam but recommended his own replacement Dave Abbruzzese. Chamberlain next served as the drummer for the Saturday Night Live house band during the 1991 and 1992 seasons.

Since leaving Saturday Night Live, Chamberlain has maintained a prolific career as an in-demand session drummer and has appeared on more than 200 albums. From the late 1990s to early 2020s he played on most studio albums and their associated tours with Tori Amos. In 2014 he joined Soundgarden as touring drummer in support of their reunion album King Animal, playing during several legs of an international tour in relief of drummer Matt Cameron who was busy touring with his other fulltime band Pearl Jam.

In addition to his frequent session work, in 1993 Chamberlain formed the jazz-fusion band Critters Buggin, with which he continues to record and perform periodically. In 2005 he was recruited by Bill Rieflin for the experimental Slow Music Project. Since 2007 Chamberlain has participated in the Floratone jazz collective led by Bill Frissell, and in 2020 he formed the grunge supergroup Painted Shield.

In 2019 Chamberlain toured extensively with Bob Dylan. During that period he served as musical director for More Music at The Moore Theatre in Seattle, Washington. In 2025 he toured extensively with Paul Simon. Between 2016 and 2024, Chamberlain won the Modern Drummer readers' poll in the Studio Musician category four times.

== Selected discography ==
=== As group member ===
Solo

- Matt Chamberlain (2005)
- Company 23 (2012)
- Comet B (2016)
- Foundry (2021)

Critters Buggin

- Guest (1994)
- Host (1997)
- Monkeypot Merganzer (1997)
- Bumpa (1998)
- Amoeba (1998)
- Stampede (2004)
- Live in 95 at the OK Hotel - Seattle 1995 (2009)
- Muti (2014)

Floratone

- Floratone (2007)
- Floratone II (2012)

Painted Shield

- Painted Shield (2020)
- Painted Shield 2 (2022)

Sean Watkins & Matt Chamberlain Duo

- Sean Watkins & Matt Chamberlain (2020)

Slow Music Project

- Live El Rey Theater, May 13 2006
- Live The Coach House, May 12 2006
- Live Largo, May 11 2006
- Live Great American Music Hall, May 9 2006
- Live Showbox, May 6 2006
- Live Aladdin Theater May 5 2006

==== As studio musician ====
Amos Lee

- My New Moon (2018)

A Perfect Circle

- Eat the Elephant (2018)

Bob Dylan

- Rough and Rowdy Ways (2020)

Brad Mehldau

- Largo (2002)
- Highway Rider (2010)
- Ride into the Sun (2025)

Brandi Carlile

- The Story (2007)
- Bear Creek (2012)
- Returning to Myself (2025)

Bruce Springsteen

- Wrecking Ball (2012)
- Western Stars (2019)

Chantal Kreviazuk

- Colour Moving and Still (1999)

Chelsea Wolfe

- The Dark (2026)

Chris Cornell

- Higher Truth (2015)

Chris Isaak

- Speak of the Devil (1998)

Dave Navarro

- Trust No One (2001)

David Bowie

- Heathen (2002)
- Reality (2003)

Edie Brickell and New Bohemians

- Ghost of a Dog (1990)

Elton John

- Songs from the West Coast (2001)

Fiona Apple

- Tidal (1996)
- When the Pawn... (1999)

Frank Ocean

- Channel Orange (2012)

Ghost

- Phantomime (2023)

Japanese Breakfast

- For Melancholy Brunettes (& Sad Women) (2025)

Jars of Clay

- Inland (2013)

John Fogerty

- Legacy: The Creedence Clearwater Revival Years (2025)

John Mayer

- Heavier Things (2003)

Kanye West

- Late Registration (uncredited, 2005)

Laura Marling

- Semper Femina (2017)

Leonard Cohen

- Thanks for the Dance (2019)

Lorde

- Solar Power (2021)

Mac Miller

- Circles (2020)

Macy Gray

- On How Life Is (1999)

Of Montreal

- False Priest (2010)
- The Controllersphere ( 2011)

Phantogram

- Voices (2014)
- Three (2016)

Perfume Genius

- Set My Heart on Fire Immediately (2020)

Peter Gabriel

- Flotsam and Jetsam (2019)

Randy Newman

- Dark Matter (2017)

Robbie Williams

- Intensive Care (2005)

Rufus Wainwright

- Unfollow the Rules (2020)

Sara Bareilles

- Little Voice (2007)
- Kaleidoscope Heart (2010)

Sam Phillips

- Omnipop (It's Only a Flesh Wound Lambchop) (1996)

Sean Lennon

- Friendly Fire (2006)

Shelby Lynne

- Love, Shelby (2001)

Stevie Nicks

- Trouble in Shangri-La (2001)

The Format

- Boycott Heaven (2026)

The Wallflowers

- Bringing Down the Horse (1996)
- Breach (2000)

Tori Amos

- From The Choirgirl Hotel (1998)
- To Venus And Back (1999)
- Strange Little Girls (2001)
- Scarlet's Walk (2002)
- Tales Of A Librarian (2003)
- The Beekeeper (2005)
- A Piano: The Collection (2006)
- American Doll Posse (2007)
- Legs And Boots (2007)
- Abnormally Attracted To Sin (2009)
- Midwinter Graces (2009)
- Christmastide (2020)
- Ocean To Ocean (2021)
- The Music Of Tori And The Muses (2025)
- In Times Of Dragons (2026)

Willie Nelson and Miranda Lambert

- Restoration: Reimagining the Songs of Elton John and Bernie Taupin (2018)

The Who

- Who (2019)

Zola Jesus

- Arkhon (2022)

=== Movie soundtracks ===
- Trainwreck
- Man of Steel
- Frozen
