= Medicine Hat (band) =

American rock band

- Origin: Seattle, Washington, United States
- Genres: Rock, alternative rock
- Years active: 1991–1995
- Labels: Collective Fruit
- Members: Sean Bates; Ed Bechard; Jason Legat; Ben McAllister; Jason Thomson

Medicine Hat, was an American rock band from Seattle, Washington and was active between 1991 and 1995.

== History ==
The bandmembers all went to Edmonds Woodway High School together, and while at Shoreline Community College in 1991, formed a band and started playing shows around 1992 and averaged about 10 shows a month. The band got their name when the drummer Jason Legat talked to a venue who demanded a name for the poster and he randomly picked 'Medicine Hat' from a long list of names. The name has no connection to the town from Alberta, Canada. The group preferred performing all ages shows because the attendees were there for the music and not just drinking. The singer Sean Bates was pictured in the Rolling Stone magazine on a spread of the Seattle scene, and was noted that he managed a local record store while expressing concern about Seattle's new found hype: "I don't mind that the whole rest of the world thinks that Seattle's so big, but I really mind that Seattle thinks that Seattle is so big." Eventually, the band was managed by Dean Zelikovsky after their former manager Judy died from a stab wound inflicted by her ex-boyfriend.

Pandemonium magazine described the band's music as progressive, with a tight and intricate rhythm section, and compared them to King Crimson. Another article notes they've been compared to Fugazi, Primus, The Police, and Jane's Addiction. The group recorded their first 3-song demo at Bad Animals studio in Seattle with Don Gilmore, who recorded Pearl Jam, Temple of the Dog and Sweetwater. McAllister described the band's songwriting process as "nothing is ever brought in finished. It's usually music first, then we leave the lyrics up to Sean."

One memorable show involved the band playing in Yakima, Washington at the Knights of Columbus hall. There was a lot of underage drinking and eventually the promoters said they couldn't pay the band. The band members stood their ground and apparently intimidated the promoters just enough that a rumor spread that they beat them up.

=== Post Medicine Hat ===
Many years after the band dissolved, Bates and McCallister got together in 2005 and formed the band C'mon C'mon that did well locally before coming to an end in 2011. McAllister then formed the band Wizard Prison with Scott Colburn, and John Vallier. Since 2017, McAllister plays in an electric guitar ensemble called Guitar Cult, and briefly played in the group Rosso Viti before the COVID-19 pandemic made that unfeasible. McAllister's brother Andy was involved in the group Conrad Ford. Sean Bates now does vocals for Halloqueen, a Queen cover band that performs only on Halloween.

== Discography ==
=== Studio albums ===
- Medicine Hat (1994)

=== Other releases ===
- Medicine Hat (1993, EP)
- Northwest Post-Grunge (1994, compilation disc - track "I Am")
