= MC 900 Ft. Jesus =

American rapper

- Born: Mark Griffin; 1957 (age 68–69); Kentucky, U.S.
- Genres: Hip-hop, acid jazz, experimental
- Occupation: Musician
- Years active: 1979–2001, 2017–present
- Labels: I.R.S. Records; American Recordings; Nettwerk
- Formerly of: The Telefones

Mark Thomas Griffin (born 1957), better known as MC 900 Ft. Jesus, is an American rapper based in Dallas, Texas. A classically trained musician, Griffin is known for blending hip-hop with socially conscious lyrics and jazz.

== Early life and education ==
Griffin's father was an army officer, and his family moved frequently before eventually settling in Dallas, Texas in 1979. Griffin studied the trumpet and has a BA in music from Morehead State University as well as an advanced degree in music from North Texas State University. Before becoming MC 900 Ft. Jesus, Griffin played in local Dallas bands The Telefones and Lithium X-Mas.

== Career ==
=== Early career ===
In 1980, Griffin joined local new-wave band, The Telefones, replacing the original trumpeter Will Clay. Following his postgraduate studies, Griffin worked as a trumpeter backing jazz players and artists including Engelbert Humperdinck.

=== MC 900 ft. Jesus ===
Unimpressed by the music he heard while working at an indie record store, VVV Records, Griffin was inspired to begin a solo career.

Hell with the Lid Off (1990) was Griffin's first album release for MC 900 Ft. Jesus, as well as the first time Griffin had appeared on a major record label. It featured DJ Zero (Patrick Rollins) and the single "Truth Is Out of Style" which gained a cult following.

The following year Welcome to My Dream (1991) was released. DJ Zero appears on Welcome to My Dream under his real name, Patrick Rollins, because of uncertainty about whether he would be able to tour in support of the album. His subsequent single, "The City Sleeps", was featured in the album which explored the mind of a serial arsonist. The song sparked controversy in Baltimore when a then ABC affiliate, WJZ, ran a report suggesting that a series of arsons in the area was a result of WHFS's airing the song.

His most recent album, One Step Ahead of the Spider, was released in 1994; it contained the single "If I Only Had a Brain", which became his best-known song. The song gained increased exposure from the music video directed for it by Spike Jonze, as well as exposure on MTV's Beavis and Butt-Head cartoon show. Rollins once again appears but is not listed in the credits.

==== Name ====
Griffin's stage name came from a sermon by Oral Roberts, in which the televangelist claimed that he had received a vision of a 900-foot-tall (270 m) Jesus, who commanded him to build a hospital (CityPlex Towers) on the campus of Oral Roberts University.

=== Initial retirement ===
Griffin eventually became disillusioned with the music industry, and sessions for his fourth album were unproductive. Record label interest waned and eventually in 2001, Griffin officially retired. He obtained his commercial pilot's license, hoping to become a flight instructor. However, when the September 11 attacks occurred, demand for flight instructors plummeted and Griffin was unable to find a job. Eventually, he found employment at a Borders bookstore.

In 2007, he began DJing weekly at a Dallas music venue, Lee Harvey's, located in the Cedars neighborhood next to downtown.

=== Coming out of retirement ===
On November 26, 2016, Griffin announced via Facebook that he was set to perform a show at The Kessler Theater in Dallas with a quartet including Chris McGuire, Greg Beck, and Wanz Dover in hopes of kick-starting a tour as well as a possible fourth album about which his former label Nettwerk had approached Griffin. On February 3, 2017, the quartet played a sold-out concert performing several of the MC 900 Ft. Jesus songs, receiving an enthusiastic ovation.

== Discography ==
=== Albums ===
- Hell with the Lid Off (1990) MC 900 Ft. Jesus with DJ Zero
- Welcome to My Dream (1991) MC 900 Ft. Jesus
- One Step Ahead of the Spider (1994) MC 900 Ft. Jesus

=== Singles ===
- "Too Bad"/"Shut Up" (1988) MC 900 Ft. Jesus with DJ Zero
- "I'm Going Straight to Heaven" (1989) MC 900 Ft. Jesus with DJ Zero
- "Truth Is Out of Style" (1989) MC 900 Ft. Jesus with DJ Zero
- "UFO's Are Real" (1990) MC 900 Ft. Jesus with DJ Zero
- "Killer Inside Me" (1991) MC 900 Ft. Jesus
- "The City Sleeps" (1991) MC 900 Ft. Jesus
- "If I Only Had a Brain" (1994) MC 900 Ft. Jesus - No. 25 Billboard Modern Rock Tracks
- "But If You Go" (1994) MC 900 Ft. Jesus
- "Falling Elevators" (1996) MC 900 Ft. Jesus
