= Dave Palmer (keyboardist) =

American jazz and rock keyboardist and session musician

- Born: November 8, 1968 (age 57); Denton, Texas, U.S.
- Genres: pop rock, rock
- Occupations: Musician, session keyboardist
- Instrument: Keyboards
- Labels: Three Crows, Two Ohm Hop, Leaning House

Dave Palmer (born November 8, 1968) is an American keyboardist and session musician from Texas, currently based in Ojai, California. He has toured, recorded, and performed with a diverse range of artists including Air, Fiona Apple, Seal, Chris Isaak, Joe Henry, Bobby Previte, Wayne Horvitz, Fleetwood Mac, Ponga, Critters Buggin, MC 900 Ft. Jesus, Aimee Mann, Solomon Burke, Turin Brakes, Cake, Lindsey Buckingham, Tegan and Sara, and Avenged Sevenfold.

Palmer is a member of the Earl Harvin Trio, based in Denton, Texas and Los Angeles, California. In 2006, he released the solo album Romance.

Reviewer Glenn Astarita described Palmer as a "top-notch acoustic jazz pianist".

== Personal life ==
Dave Palmer was born on November 8, 1968, in Denton, Texas. He began studying piano at a young age and was performing professionally by the age of 17 in jazz and rock venues in Norfolk, Virginia, and Dallas, Texas.

Palmer studied at the University of North Texas, which is known for its prominent jazz program. Following his studies, he moved to Seattle and San Francisco before settling in Los Angeles to pursue a career in session work and live performance.

In addition to live and studio collaborations, Palmer has contributed music for film. He composed and performed parts of the score for the 2010 film Beginners and appeared on soundtracks for films including Stranger than Fiction (2006), Goats (2012), and others.

As of 2025, Palmer resides in Ojai, California, where he continues to work as a composer, session musician, and musical director.

== Discography ==
=== Solo and collaborative albums ===
- Strange Happy – with Earl Harvin (1997)
- Live at the Gypsy Tea Room – with Earl Harvin Trio (1999)
- Unincorporated – with Earl Harvin Trio (2001)
- The Jam – with Fred Hamilton and the Earl Harvin Trio (DVD, 2005)
- Romance (2006)

=== Selected appearances as a sideman ===
- Air – Talkie Walkie (2004)
- Fiona Apple – Extraordinary Machine (2005)
- Joe Henry – Scar (2001), Civilians (2007)
- Seal – various live and studio recordings
- Chris Isaak – touring musician (dates unlisted)
- Aimee Mann – Lost in Space (2002), The Forgotten Arm (2005)
- Solomon Burke – Don't Give Up on Me (2002)
- Turin Brakes – Jackinabox (2005)
- Cake – studio contributions (uncredited)
- Tegan and Sara – The Con (2007)
- Avenged Sevenfold – Avenged Sevenfold (2007)
- Wayne Horvitz – live performances
- Ponga – live recordings and improvisations
- MC 900 Ft. Jesus – live keyboards and programming
