= Aja West =

American funk musician

Aja West was an American funk musician.

West first emerged onto the music scene in 1998 with his debut record White Moses. In 1999, he released the progressive hip-hop album Trauma...Life in the E.R. on his own Mackrosoft Records label. The album pays homage to artists like Beastie Boys and Eminem. West's albums are recorded in three Mackrosoft Studios around the country: The Sauna Room in Eagle Rock, California, The Mochi Factory in Los Angeles, California, and The Trophy Room in Mercer Island, Washington. West also records with his brother Cheeba as Aja West and Cheeba, and is a member of The Mackrosoft. West and Cheeba's Flash & Snowball won Best Jam Album at the 2006 Independent Music Awards. West was also winner of the 7th Annual Independent Music Awards Jam Album of the Year for "The Olympian" AND "Total Recall 2012" won R&B Album of the year.

== Discography ==
=== Albums ===
- White Moses (1998)
- Trauma...Life in the E.R. (1999, Mackrosoft)
