= Critters Buggin =

Band

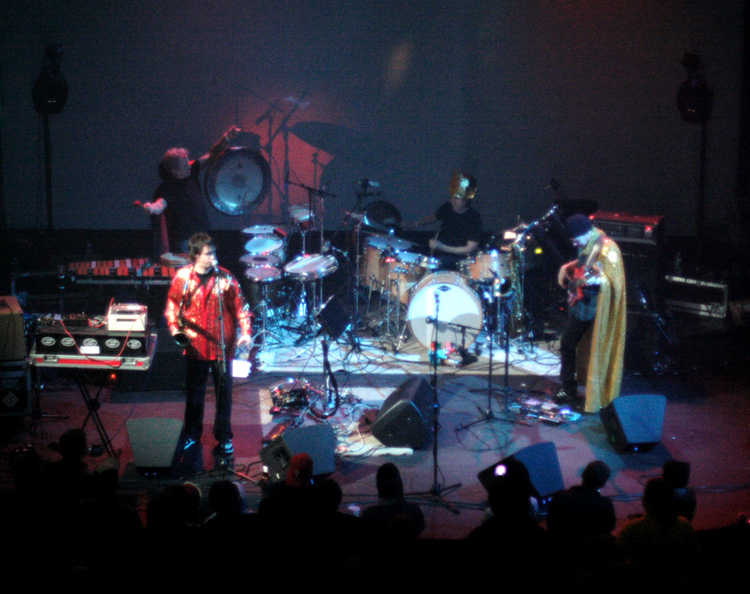
- Critters Buggin New Year's Eve 2008 at the Capitol Theatre in Olympia, Washington

Background information
- Origin: Seattle, Washington, USA
- Genres: Rock, jazz, funk, punk, ambient, electronic
- Years active: 1993–present
- Label: Ropeadope Records
- Members: Matt Chamberlain; Skerik; Mike Dillon
- Past members: John Bush; Brad Houser
- Website: Crittersbuggin.com

Critters Buggin is a Seattle, Washington-based instrumental group which performs in a jazz, rock and African-influenced, eclectic style. The band is composed of Matt Chamberlain (drums, percussion, piano, programming, synths, loops, samples and digital editing), Skerik (saxophones, keyboards, loops, samples, effects and guitar), Brad Houser (bass, baritone saxophone, bass clarinet and electronics) and Mike Dillon (vibraphone and percussion).

== Music ==
Critters Buggin defies categorization because of their diverse musical styles. Reviews tend to describe their music as a combination of jazz, rock, funk and electronica. When asked to describe their music in 1994 Chamberlain stated that it is "jazzy, funky, rocky.... it has African rhythms, too." Houser stated it is "African, industrial, tribal music."

While also reviewed in terms such as unique and adventurous, a 2008 review in The Seattle Times described them with such diverse terms as unorthodox, unhinged, tribal, unpredictable, mesmerizing, loud, abrasive, dissonant and ultimately satisfying.

== History ==
The group began with Matt Chamberlain and Skerik who were later joined by Brad Houser, thus forming a trio in early 1993. John Bush joined soon afterward, and the group gave their first live performance using the "Critters Buggin" name in May 1993 at the Seattle club The Colourbox. Chamberlain, Houser and Bush were all from the then-disbanded Edie Brickell & New Bohemians. Skerik came from another Seattle group, Sadhappy. Their live success was followed by the release of their first album which was produced by Stone Gossard of Pearl Jam on his then new label Loosegroove. The original Critters Buggin trio continued with several guest musicians, including Mike Dillon. Chamberlain and Dillon had both played in the locally popular Dallas, Texas band Ten Hands in the 1980s. All except Skerik were part of the Deep Ellum, Dallas, Texas scene through the early 1990s. By 1998 Dillon had joined Critters Buggin as a fourth member, thus forming the current line-up as of a July 2008 tour.

In 2007 Critters Buggin released the DVD, Get the Clackervalve and the Old Clobberd Biscuits Out and Smack the Grand Ham Clapper's Mother. It is a live set filmed and recorded during the Warsaw Summer Jazz Days 1999 performed in The Palace of Culture and Science of Warsaw, Poland.

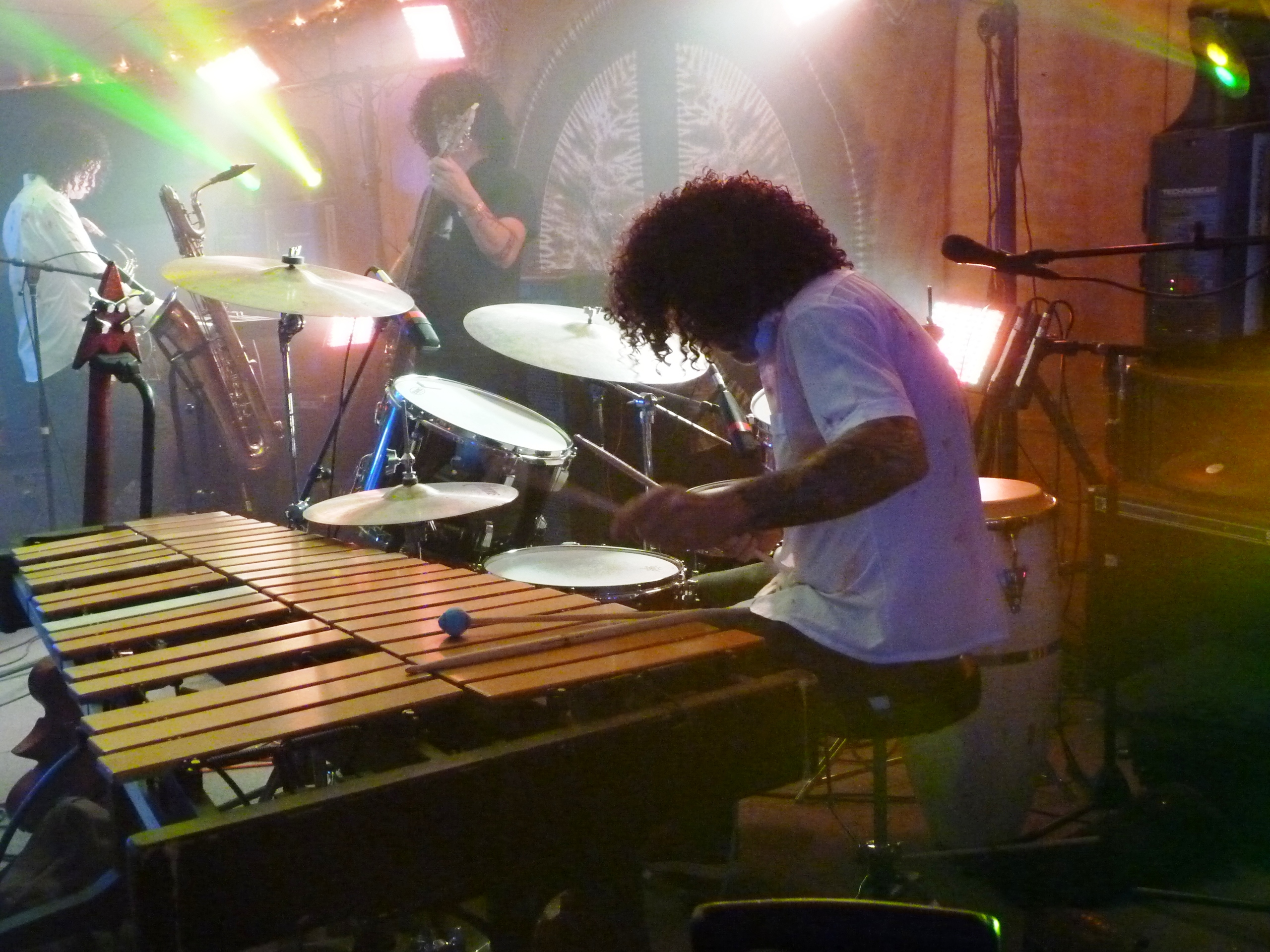
Skerik, Brad Houser and Mike Dillon as The Dead Kenny G's at the Bear Creek Music and Arts Festival November 2010.

=== Critters Buggin Trio (2006) ===
In 2006 Skerik, Dillon and Houser toured as Critters Buggin Trio. In the 2007 the trio toured as The Dead Kenny G's and were reviewed as uniquely "combining jazz, rock, punk, funk and world music." In October 2009 they released a debut CD Bewildered Herd. The trio toured with Primus in 2010 and released the CD Operation Long Leash in 2011.

== Discography ==
=== Studio and live albums ===
- 1994 – Guest (Loosegroove)
- 1997 – Host (Loosegroove)
- 1997 – Monkeypot Merganzer (independent)
- 1998 – Bumpa (Loosegroove)
- 1998 – Amoeba (Loosegroove)
- 2004 – Stampede (Ropeadope Records)
- 2009 – Live in 95 at the OK Hotel – Seattle 1995 (independent)
- 2014 – Muti EP (independent)

Guest, Host, Monkeypot Merganzer and Bumpa were reissued by Kufala Recordings in 2004.

=== EPs and compilations ===
- 1996 – Endless Records complication one – various artists (Endless Records) "Sweat Box"
- 2000 – Taxi (independent – EP vinyl)

=== DVD ===
- 2007 – Get the Clackervalve and the Old Clobberd Biscuits Out and Smack the Grand Ham Clapper's Mother

(Live 6/26/99 Warsaw Summer Jazz Days)
