= Brad Houser =

- Born: John Bradley Houser; September 7, 1960
- Origin: Dallas, Texas, U.S.
- Died: July 24, 2023 (aged 62)
- Genres: Alternative rock, jam rock
- Occupation: Musician
- Instruments: Bass guitar, baritone saxophone, bass clarinet
- Years active: 1985–2023
- Formerly of: Edie Brickell & New Bohemians, Critters Buggin

John Bradley Houser (September 7, 1960 – July 24, 2023) was an American bass guitar, baritone saxophone and bass clarinet player, originally from Dallas, Texas. He was a co-founding member of the New Bohemians, later to become known as Edie Brickell & New Bohemians. He also co-founded Critters Buggin (of Seattle, Washington) with fellow New Bohemian Matt Chamberlain, Mike Dillon, and Skerik.

In 2006 he stated, "In Austin I play with the Patrice Pike Band, Steve Wedemeyer, Colin Brooks, Oliver Rajamani, Zydeco Blanco, and The Summer Wardrobe..." In 2008 he could be seen playing with Mingtones (Laura Scarborough) and BoomboxATX in Austin, Texas. BoomboxATX debut Feel the Boombox was released 2007.

Houser is credited on recordings by other Austin-based artists such as Aimee Bobruk (2006), OHN (2005), and Mastica (2002). He rejoined members of Critters Buggin for Black Frames Solarallergy (2003) and for Stampede (2005). In 2006 he reunited with Edie Brickell & New Bohemians to release Stranger Things.

Also Houser toured with Skerik and Mike Dillon. In October 2009 the trio released a CD, Bewildered Herd.

Houser also co-designed a line of bass guitars with Reverend Guitars named the "Brad Houser 5".

In January 2019, Houser unveiled a new collaboration with Reverend Guitars—the Reverend Basshouser Fatfish 32.

Houser died from a stroke on July 24, 2023, at the age of 62.
