= Mike Dillon (musician) =

American musician

- Mike "Tree Frog" Dillon

Background information
- Origin: Texas / Kansas City / New Orleans
- Instruments: Percussion; vibraphone; drums
- Labels: Hyena, Indie, Ropeadope

Mike Dillon (a.k.a. Mike D) is an American percussionist, vibraphonist, bandleader, and vocalist born in San Antonio, Texas. He is a member of Critters Buggin, Les Claypool's Fancy Band and Garage A Trois. He has performed with many musicians including Ani DiFranco, Galactic, Brave Combo, Karl Denson's Tiny Universe, Marco Benevento, Clutch, Claude Coleman Jr., and New Orleans musicians Kevin O'Day, Johnny Vidacovich and James Singleton.

Dillon's love of playing percussion was born out of his love for the band Rush as a teenager. He originally performed in the 1980s with local Dallas and Denton favorites Ten Hands. In the 1990s he led Dallas-based Billy Goat, In the late 1990s, Billy Goat disbanded and he performed in the Kansas City-based Malachy Papers and the Austin-based Hairy Apes BMX (HABMX).

In 2006, Dillon started a project "Mike Dillon's Go-Go Jungle" which included members of Billy Goat, drummer Go-Go Ray, and bassist, J.J. Jungle. The live Go-Go Jungle also performs songs from Dillon's prior projects. They released their second CD entitled Rock Star Bench Press in 2009.

Dillon contributed the majority of compositions to Garage A Trois' Power Patriot CD released in 2009.

Dillon and saxophonist Skerik perform as a trio called "The Dead Kenny G's" with alternate third members. National tours have included keyboardist Brian Haas and bassist Brad Houser. With Houser they have also toured as "Critters Buggin Trio". They released a CD entitled Bewildered Herd in 2009. As a trio with bassist James Singleton, Dillon and Skerik have toured as "Illuminasti" and as a trio with Les Claypool they have been billed as "The Fancy Trio".

Dillon is married to artist Peregrine Honig, whom he resides with in Kansas City and New Orleans, but a busy touring schedule keeps him on the road much of the time.

== Discography ==
- Black Frames Solarallergy (2002)
- Mike Dillon (2003)
- Mike Dillon's Go-Go Jungle Battery Milk (2007)
- The Dead Kenny G's Bewildered Herd (2009)
- Mike Dillon's Go-Go Jungle Rock Star Bench Press (2009)
- Mike Dillon and Earl Harvin People Gardens (2010 – recorded 2005)
- The Dead Kenny G's Operation Long Leash (2011)
- Mike Dillon Urn (2012)
- The Dead Kenny G's Gorelick (2012)
- DVS [Mike Dillon, Johnny Vidacovich, James Singleton] "Bones"
- Mike Dillon Band of Outsider (2014)
- Nolatet "Dogs" (2016)
- Mike Dillon Functioning Broke (2016)
- Mike Dillon Life is Not a Football (2017)
- Nolatet No Revenge Necessary (2018)
- Mike Dillon Bonobo (2018)
- Mike Dillon Rosewood (2020)
- Mike Dillon & Punkadelic Shoot the Moon (2021)
- Mike Dillon & The Bad Decisions Suitcase Man (2021 )
- Mike Dillon 1918 (2021)
- Mike Dillon & Punkadelick Featuring Nikkie Glaspie and Brian Haas ‘’Inflorescence’’ (2023)

=== See also discographies ===
- Billy Goat
- Hairy Apes BMX
- Malachy Papers
- Critters Buggin
- Garage A Trois

=== With others ===
- Ten Hands Kung Fu ... That's What I Like (1988)
- Ten Hands The Big One Is Coming (1989)
- MC 900 Ft Jesus One Step Ahead of the Spider (1994)
- Ten Hands The Big One That Got Away (1996)
- Pigface The Best of Pigface: Preaching to the Perverted (2001)
- Karl Denson The Bridge (2002)
- Les Claypool Purple Onion (2002)
- Les Claypool Of Whales and Woe (2006)
- Ani DiFranco Canon (2007)
- Marco Benevento Live at Tonic (2007)
- Ani DiFranco Red Letter Year (2008)
- Santogold Santogold (2008)
- Les Claypool Of Fungi and Foe (2009)
- Ani Difranco "Which Side Are You On" (2012)
- Wavves "Afraid of Heights" (2013)
- Secret Chiefs 3 (Ishraqiyun) Perichoresis (2014)
- Primus Primus & the Chocolate Factory with the Fungi Ensemble (2014)
- Karl Denson New Ammo (2014)
- The Revivalists Men Amongst Mountains (2015)
- Stanton Moore "With You in Mind" (2017)
- Robert Walter's 20th Congress Spacesuit (2018)
- Clutch Book of Bad Decisions (2018)
- The Dean Ween Group rock2 (2018)
- Rickie Lee Jones Kicks 2019
- Karl Denson's Tiny Universe Gnomes and Badgers (2019)
- The Iceman Special Circular Purple Circus (2021)
