= Crawfish Fiesta =

Studio album by Professor Longhair
- Released: 1980
- Recorded: 1979
- Genre: New Orleans blues; New Orleans R&B; Louisiana blues; boogie-woogie
- Length: 42:18
- Label: Alligator
- Producer: Allison Kaslow, Andrew Kaslow, Bruce Iglauer

Crawfish Fiesta is an album by Professor Longhair, released in 1980 by Alligator Records. It features Dr. John, who reprised his original role as guitarist in Longhair's band, Johnny Vidacovich on drums, Tony Dagradi and Andrew Kaslow on sax, and Longhair's long time conga player Alfred "Uganda" Roberts. The album was recorded at the Sea-Saint Studios in New Orleans and it was co-produced by Kaslow, his wife Allison and Bruce Iglauer. It won the first W.C. Handy Blues Album of the Year award in 1980.

On October 16, 2012, Alligator Records reissued the album on vinyl with one previously unreleased bonus track, a cover Percy Mayfield's "River's Invitation" which was recorded during rehearsal of the recording session of the album.

== Critical reception ==
Professional ratings
Review scores
Source	Rating
AllMusic	4.5/5 stars
Robert Christgau	A
DownBeat	4/5 stars
The Penguin Guide to Blues Recordings	4/4 stars
The Rolling Stone Album Guide	3/5 stars

The album was voted as one of the Top 10 Albums of the Year by The New York Times.

DownBeat reviewer Michael Goldberg praised the release as a "near perfect album for Longhair to leave behind". He called Longhair "as agile as a teenager" at the keyboard. He said the album was a "tour de force" that should be in every R&B collection.

== Track listing ==
All tracks composed by Roy Byrd; except where indicated

1. "Big Chief" (Earl King; Ulis Gaines, Wardell Quezergue) – 3:13
2. "Her Mind is Gone" – 4:23
3. "Something on Your Mind" (Big Jay McNeely) – 4:10
4. "You're Driving Me Crazy" – 2:34
5. "Red Beans" (McKinley Morganfield) – 4:09
6. "Willie Fugal's Blues" – 2:03
7. "It's My Fault, Darling" (Miles Grayson, Lermon Horton) – 4:54
8. "In the Wee Wee Hours" – 3:23
9. "Cry to Me" (Bert Russell) – 3:35
10. "Bald Head" – 2:58
11. "Whole Lotta Lovin'" (Dave Bartholomew, Fats Domino) – 3:46
12. "Crawfish Fiesta" – 3:10
13. "River's Invitation" (Percy Mayfield) (bonus rehearsal track, 2012) – 3:14

== Personnel ==
- Professor Longhair - vocals, piano
- Dr. John - guitar
- Tony Dagradi - tenor saxophone, horn arrangements
- Andrew Kaslow - tenor saxophone, horn arrangements
- Jim Moore - baritone saxophone
- Alfred "Uganda" Roberts - conga
- Johnny Vidacovich - drums
- David Lee Watson - bass
- Mac Rebennack - assistant producer
