= What It Was =

What It was

Studio album by Steve Masakowski
- Released: 1993
- Recorded: April 1993
- Genre: Jazz
- Length: 58:47
- Label: Blue Note Records
- Producer: David Torkanowsky

Steve Masakowski chronology
Things I Like (2013)	What It was (1993)	Direct Axecess (1994)

What It Was is an album by American jazz guitarist Steve Masakowski featuring performances recorded in 1993 for the Blue Note Records label.

== Reception ==
In a Downbeat magazine review, the album received a 4½ stars rating.

== Track listing ==
All compositions by Steve Masakowski except as indicated

1. "Tino’s Blues" – 4:17
2. "What It Was" – 5:57
3. "The Big Easy" – 6:10
4. "Hector’s Lecture" – 4:38
5. "Budapest" – 8:00
6. "Stepping Stone" – 5:18
7. "Southern Blue" – 5:58
8. "Joao" – 2:56
9. "Starling" – 4:29
10. "Quiet Now" (Denny Zeitlin) – 4:32
11. "Alexandra" – 3:40
12. "Jesus’ Last Ballad" (Gianni Bedori)– 2:52

Recorded at the New Orleans Recording Co., April 1993, and Studio 13, New Orleans, LA, n.d.

== Personnel ==
- Steve Masakowski – Seven-string guitar
- Rick Margitza – tenor saxophone
- Michael Pellera – piano, keyboard
- Larry Sieberth – keyboard
- David Torkanowsky – keyboard
- James Genus – electric bass
- Bill Huntington – acoustic bass
- James Singleton (musician) – acoustic bass
- Ricky Sebastian – drums
- Johnny Vidacovich - drums
- Don Alias – percussion
- Hector Gallardo – bongos
