= James Westfall =

American jazz vibraphonist and keyboardist

- Born: 1981 (age 44–45); Houston, Texas
- Genres: Jazz, jazz fusion, rock
- Instruments: Vibraphone, keytar
- Years active: 2003–present
- Label: Bionic
- Member of: The Wee Trio
- Website: jameswestfall.com

James Westfall is a jazz vibraphonist and keyboardist born in Houston, Texas.

He began on violin at age 6 before moving to piano and then percussion. He became interested in vibraphone due in part to his grandfather.

He attended the University of New Orleans. In New Orleans he studied under Terence Blanchard, Harold Battiste, Steve Masakowski and Ellis Marsalis Jr. Later he moved to Los Angeles, California where he was part of the Thelonious Monk Institute of Jazz. At present he lives in Nashville working as a studio musician.

Westfall is a founding member of The Wee Trio.

== Discography ==
- Capitol Diner Vol. 1 with the Wee Trio (Bionic, 2007)
- Capitol Diner Vol. 2 with the Wee Trio (Bionic, 2010)
- Ashes to Ashes with the Wee Trio (Bionic, 2012)
- Wee + 3 with the Wee Trio (Bionic, 2016)

=== As sideman ===
- Sasha Masakowski, Wishes (Hypersoul, 2011)
