= Classified (James Booker album) =

Studio album by James Booker
- Released: 1982
- Genres: R&B, blues, jazz
- Label: Rounder
- Producer: Scott Billington

Classified is a studio album by the New Orleans pianist James Booker, released in 1982. It was reissued in an expanded edition in 2013.

== Production ==
The album was produced by Scott Billington, who recorded several sessions with Booker in 1982. The sessions were at times interrupted by Booker's odd behavior or his stints in jail. Classified captures both solo and quartet recordings; Booker's Maple Leaf Bar band included bassist James Singleton, saxophonist Alvin Tyler, and drummer Johnny Vidacovich. The Professor Longhair medley came to an abrupt end when Booker left mid-song in order to cash a check.

== Critical reception ==
Professional ratings
Review scores
Source	Rating
AllMusic	5/5 stars
Robert Christgau	B+
The Encyclopedia of Popular Music	3/5 stars
MusicHound Rock: The Essential Album Guide	4/5 stars
The Philadelphia Inquirer	5/5 stars
The Rolling Stone Album Guide	4/5 stars

Robert Christgau wrote that "in general there's too much reliance on the left hand, with the consequent loss of dynamic subtlety compounded by a klutzy drum mix." The Philadelphia Daily News praised Booker's "great stomping piano, [which is] not quite as fervent as Fats Domino or as idiosyncratic as Professor Longhair, but mightily infectious all the same."

AllMusic called the album "one of the great blues albums of the early '80s."

== Track listing ==
No.	Title	Writer(s)	Length
1.	"All Around the World"	Titus Turner	3:22
2.	"One for the Highway"	Fats Domino	2:30
3.	"King of the Road"	Roger Miller	2:53
4.	"Professor Longhair Medley: Bald Head / Tipitina"	Roy Byrd	3:36
5.	"Baby Face"	Bert Kalmar, Harry Ruby	3:08
6.	"Swedish Rhapsody"	Traditional; arranged by James Booker	2:05
7.	"Classified"	Booker	3:12
8.	"Lawdy Miss Clawdy"	Lloyd Price	3:24
9.	"Angel Eyes"	Matt Dennis, Earl K. Brent	3:26
10.	"Hound Dog"	Jerry Leiber, Mike Stoller	2:26
11.	"If You're Lonely"	James, Gibson	2:49
12.	"Three Keys"	Booker	3:17

== Personnel ==
- James Booker – piano
- James Singleton – bass
- Alvin Tyler – saxophone
- Johnny Vidacovich – drums
