= Cure all =

Cure all may refer to:

- Panacea (medicine), a remedy that is claimed to be able to cure any disease
- Cure All, an album by keyboardist Robert Walter
- Cure-All, a 19th-century racehorse
