= New Orleans Piano Wizard: Live! =

Live album by James Booker
- Released: 1981
- Recorded: November 27, 1977, Zurich
- Genre: Blues, New Orleans rhythm and blues
- Label: Rounder

James Booker chronology
Junco Partner (1976)	New Orleans Piano Wizard: Live! (1981)	Classified (1982)

New Orleans Piano Wizard: Live! is a live album by the American musician James Booker, released in 1981. It is a licensed version of Live!, which was released on the Swiss Gold Records label in 1978.

== Production ==
The album was recorded at the 1977 Boogie Woogie and Ragtime Piano Contest, in Zurich, in front of a raucous crowd. "Please Send Me Someone to Love" is a cover of the Percy Mayfield song. "Tell Me How Do You Feel" was written by Ray Charles. "Come In My House" is a version of Joe Tex's "Come In This House". "Come Rain or Come Shine" was composed by Harold Arlen. Booker ends "Something Stupid" with a musical passage from the song "Tea for Two".

== Critical reception ==
Professional ratings
Review scores
Source	Rating
All Music Guide to Soul	4/5 stars
Robert Christgau	A−
The Encyclopedia of Popular Music	3/5 stars
Lincoln Journal Star	4.5/5 stars
Los Angeles Times	2.5/5 stars
MusicHound Blues: The Essential Album Guide	3.5/5 stars
Oakland Tribune	3/4 stars
The Penguin Guide to Blues Recordings	3/4 stars
The Rolling Stone Jazz & Blues Album Guide	4/5 stars
Santa Barbara News and Review	4/5 stars

The Oakland Tribune called New Orleans Piano Wizard: Live! "one of the best blues albums in some time." The News & Observer said that Booker's vocals "are a heavy dose of head tones and Ray Charles-like sanctification". The Los Angeles Times opined that the album was "derivative but earnest", but praised "Black Night" and "Keep On Gwine". The Lincoln Journal Star stated that "the New Orleans rhythm and blues style is distinctively syncopated, and Booker's version is engagingly personal."

The Detroit Free Press noted, "It's true that he'd never make it on his voice alone, but darn in that cracked tenor can't grow on you." The San Francisco Examiner said that Booker "has a stronger harmonic sense than most blues pianists". Robert Christgau wrote that "his arpeggios, harmonies, and insidious timing create an irresistible roller coaster effect".

The album won the Grand Prix du Disque de Jazz. It is included in Tom Moon's 1,000 Recordings to Hear Before You Die.

== Track listing ==
Side one

1. "On the Sunny Side of the Street"
2. "Black Night"
3. "Keep On Gwine"
4. "Come Rain or Come Shine"
5. "Something Stupid"

Side two

1. "Please Send Me Someone to Love"
2. "Tell Me How Do You Feel"
3. "Let Them Talk"
4. "Come In My House"
