= Super Heavy Organ =

Studio album by Robert Walter
- Released: 2005
- Recorded: January 2005 at Truck Farm, New Orleans, LA
- Genre: Jazz, funk, groove
- Length: 62:55
- Label: Magnitude Records
- Producer: Dan Prothero

Robert Walter chronology
Giving Up the Ghost (2003)	Super Heavy Organ (2005)	Cure All (2008)

Professional ratings
Review scores
Source	Rating
All About Jazz link Allmusic	4/5 stars

Super Heavy Organ is an album by New Orleans and San Diego keyboardist Robert Walter.

== Musicians ==
- Robert Walter - Hammond organ, piano, clavinet, melodica, percussion
- Johnny Vidacovich - drums
- Stanton Moore - drums
- Tim Green - tenor saxophone
- James Singleton - bass
- Anthony Farrell (special guest) - vocals

== Track listing ==
1. "Adelita"
2. "Kickin' Up the Dust"
3. "Spell"
4. "El Cuervo"
5. "Criminals Have a Name for It"
6. "34 Small"
7. "Don't Hate, Congratulate"
8. "Poor Tom"
9. "Dad's Drunk Again"
10. "Big Dummy"
11. "Hardware"
12. "Cabrillo"
