= Robert Walter (musician) =

American jazz keyboardist

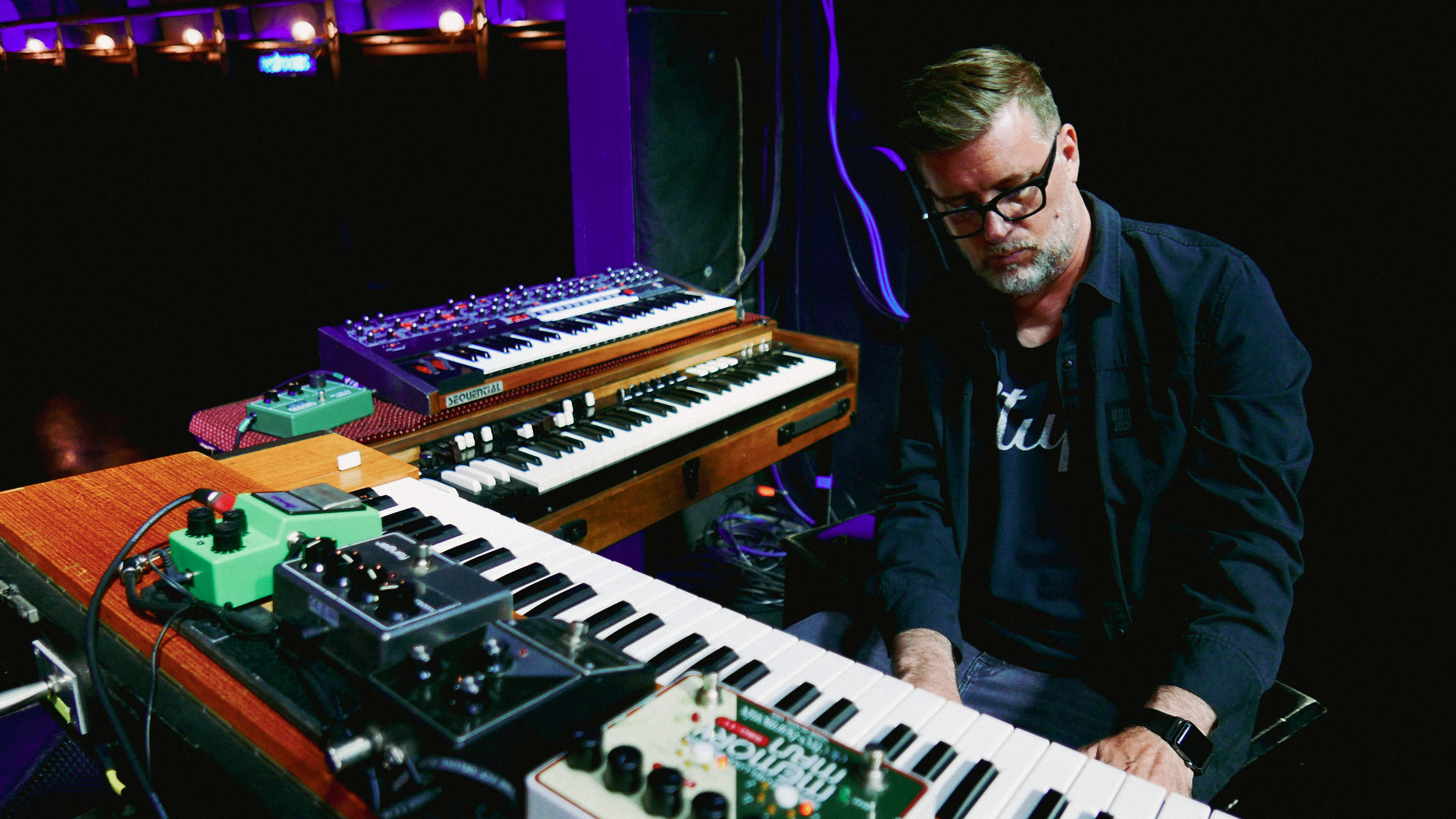
- Robert Walter in Los Angeles, 2024

Background information
- Born: May 3, 1970 (age 56); San Diego, California, U.S.
- Genres: Jazz, soul jazz, rock, ambient
- Occupation: Musician
- Instruments: Hammond B3 organ, Fender Rhodes, piano, synths
- Years active: 1990s–present
- Labels: Fog City, Royal Potato Family
- Website: robertwalter.com

Robert Walter is an American keyboard player specializing in soul jazz on the Hammond B3 organ and Fender Rhodes. He is best known as a founding member of The Greyboy Allstars. Walter, splits his time between The Greyboy Allstars, his own 20th Congress, and a robust film soundtrack session career in Los Angeles.

== Biography ==
After starting on piano, Robert developed a deep connection with the Hammond organ and its place in American musical tradition. Gospel, Jazz, soul music and psychedelic rock have all been impacted and defined by the classic grind and warble of the B3 and Leslie speaker. He learned first-hand from masters of the instrument like Dr. Lonnie Smith, Art Neville, and Rueben Wilson. He has performed and recorded with heavyweights Fred Wesley, Roger Waters, Gary Bartz, Bernard Purdie, George Porter Jr., Skerik, Melvin Sparks, Andy Bey, Reuben Wilson, Susan Tedeschi, Harvey Mason, Alec Ounsworth, Anders Osborne, Red Holloway, Chuck Rainey, Phil Upchurch, Mike Clark, Johnny Vidacovich, Joey Waronker, Mike Gordon, Brooks Nielsen, and Steve Kimock.

Walter became a part of the early San Diego music scene while still in high school in 1984, first playing drums in the funk-rock band Daddy Long Leggs, a foursome that included magnet-high-school students Walter, Mike Watson, Damien Dunmore, and Brian Jordan. After the break-up of Daddy Long Leggs, Walter moved over to keyboards (under the pseudonym "Stretch") forming the rock band Creedle, which emerged in the early '90s. The band released three full-length albums along with numerous 7" singles.

Walter co-founded The Greyboy Allstars, which initially formed in 1993 as the backing band for rare groove luminary DJ Greyboy and started playing weekly at San Diego's now defunct Green Circle, weekends at San Francisco's Elbo Room and various clubs throughout Europe.

In 1999, six years into The Greyboy Allstars, Walter formed Robert Walter's 20th Congress, which featured Robert on electric piano and Hammond B3 organ, Dap-Kings Cochemea Gastelum on alto sax, electric sax and flute, Chris Stillwell on bass and Stanton Moore on drums. 20th Congress released their debut full-length recording, Money Shot, on San Francisco's Fog City Records in 2000.

Walter moved from his native San Diego to New Orleans in 2003, and subsequently reunited with producer Dan Prothero to record Super Heavy Organ with local legends Johnny Vidacovich, James Singleton, Tim Green, and Stanton Moore.

In 2008, Walter recorded and released Cure All with James Singleton and Johnny Vidacovich. AllMusic calls it soul-jazz with "a healthy balance of intellect and funkiness".

In Spring of 2013, The Greyboy Allstars released Inland Emperor, their first album since 2007's What Happened to Television? A move from New Orleans to Los Angeles jump-started Robert Walter's 20th Congress once again. He released Get Thy Bearings, which pushed Walter's organ, piano, Rhodes and synthesizer to the front of a group rounded out by guitarist/bassist Elgin Park, drummer Aaron Redfield, sax players Karl Denson and Cochemea Gastelum, and percussionist Chuck Prada. It was recorded in just a few takes at Elgonix Labs, the same studio where Walter has lent his skills to Get Thy Bearings producer Michael Andrews' film scores and productions. Since returning to LA, recording film scores has widened the conceptual palate of Walters' work.

In April 2015, Robert began playing keys with Mike Gordon, while continuing his other projects and The Greyboy Allstars.

In September 2018, Walter released Spacesuit, a new studio album by 20th Congress. His latest release, Better Feathers, was a series of tracks written and recorded entirely at home in quarantine during 2020–2021, and originally released two tracks at a time as a series of digital 45s. Walter immersed himself in the writing and recording process as a way to remain creative and fend off boredom while faced with a year of no live shows. According to Walter, the title Better Feathers comes from the idea of birds molting — shedding their old, worn-out feathers for new, better ones.

In June 2022, Walter appeared on The Late Show with Stephen Colbert as the Hammond B3 organ player with musical guest (and Pink Floyd co-founder) Roger Waters' band. Robert performed 99-dates with Roger Waters on his This Is Not a Drill North American, European and South American tours. He played Hammond B3 organ, ARP Solina String Ensemble, Clavinet, piano, and melodica. Walter was part of Waters' band for his Dark Side Of The Moon Redux debut performances in London in October 2023.

== Soundtrack Production ==
Walter has a film soundtrack session career in Los Angeles (with his bandmate and renowned composer Michael Andrews) which began in 1998 when Andrews and The Greyboy Allstars were asked to score Jake Kasdan's first feature, Zero Effect.

Walter has performed on the Andrews' composed movie scores for Walk Hard: The Dewey Cox Story, Bridesmaids, Bad Teacher, Jeff, Who Lives at Home, Neighbors 2: Sorority Rising, The Five-Year Engagement, The Adderall Diaries, The Reluctant Fundamentalist, 20 Feet From Stardom, The Heat, Tammy, Sex Tape, Instant Family, The Big Sick, I Feel Pretty, Second Act, The Lovebirds, The King of Staten Island, Roadrunner: A Film About Anthony Bourdain, The Bubble, Totally Killer, You're Cordially Invited, and Pharrell Williams' Piece By Piece.

He has performed on the Andrews' composed television scores for the HBO series Togetherness, The Zen Diaries of Garry Shandling, Apple TV+'s Platonic, and the theme song for New Girl.

== Discography ==
=== As leader ===
- Spirit of '70 with Gary Bartz (Greyboy, 1996)
- Health and Fitness (Fog City, 1999)
- Money Shot (Fog City, 2000)
- There Goes the Neighborhood (Premonition, 2001)
- Giving Up the Ghost (Magnatude, 2003)
- Super Heavy Organ (Magnatude, 2005)
- In a Holiday Groove with Robert Walter and His Bumpin' Beats (Fog City, 2006)
- Cure All (Palmetto, 2008)
- Get Thy Bearings (Royal Potato Family, 2013)
- Aquarium Drunkard's Lagniappe Sessions Vol. 1 (Royal Potato Family, 2006)
- Spacesuit (Royal Potato Family, 2018)
- Aquarium Drunkard's Lagniappe Sessions Vol. 2 (Royal Potato Family, 2018)
- Better Feathers (Royal Potato Family, 2022)
- Aquarium Drunkard's Lagniappe Sessions Vol. 3 (Royal Potato Family, 2023)

With The Greyboy Allstars

- West Coast Boogaloo with Fred Wesley (Greyboy, 1994; Light In The Attic, 2020)
- A Town Called Earth (Greyboy, 1997)
- GBA Live (Relaxed/ADA, 1999)
- What Happened to Television? (SCI Fidelity, 2007)
- Inland Emperor (Knowledge Room Recordings, 2013)
- Como De Allstars (Knowledge Room Recordings, 2020)
- Get a Job: Music From The Original Broadcast Series Soul Dream (Knowledge Room Recordings, 2022)
- Grab Bag: 2007-2023 (Knowledge Room Recordings, 2024)

With WRD Trio

- The Hit with Eddie Roberts + Adam Deitch (Color Red, 2021)

With The Rare Sounds

- Introducing The Rare Sounds with Eddie Roberts, Chris Stillwell, Zak Najor (Color Red, 2024)

=== As sideman ===
With Creedle

- Half Man Half Pie (Cargo/Headhunter, 1992)
- Bad Radio [EP] (Cargo/Headhunter, 1993)
- Silent Weapons for Quiet Wars (Headhunter, 1994)
- When the Wind Blows (Headhunter, 1996)

With Karl Denson

- The D Stands for Diesel (Greyboy, 1995)
- The Bridge (Relaxed/ADA, 2002)
- New Ammo (Stoopid, 2014)

With Roger Waters

- Comfortably Numb (2022) (Sony Music, 2022)
- The Dark Side of the Moon Redux (2023)
- This Is Not A Drill: Live From Prague – Roger Waters (2025)

With Mike Gordon

- Overstep (ATO, 2014)
- OGOGO (ATO/Megaplum, 2017)
- Flying Games (ATO/Megaplum, 2023)

With Greyboy

- Land of the Lost (Ubiquity, 1995)
- To Know You Is to Love You (Ubiquity, 2001)
- Soul Mosaic (Ubiquity, 2004)

With Gary Jules

- Greetings from the Side (A&M, 1998)
- Trading Snakeoil for Wolftickets (Sanctuary, 2003)

With Stanton Moore

- III with Will Bernard (Telarc, 2006)
- Emphasis! (On Parenthesis) with Will Bernard (Telarc, 2008)
- Groove Alchemy with Will Bernard (Telarc, 2010)

With Brooks Nielsen

- Brooks Nielsen, One Match Left (2022)
- Brooks Nielsen, The Circle EP (2023)

With others

- JJ Grey & Mofro, Blackwater (Alligator, 2001)
- Elgin Park, Elgin Park (Everloving, 2001)
- Anders Osborne, American Patchwork (Alligator, 2010)
- Alec Ounsworth, Mo Beauty (Anti/Epitaph, 2009)
- Susan Tedeschi, Back to the River (Verve Forecast, 2008)
- Various artists, Walk Hard: The Dewey Cox Story (Columbia, 2007)
- George Porter Jr. "The Flóki Sessions" (Color Red, 2023)
- Fitz (Fitz And The Tantrums) "Summer Of Us" (Elektra Entertainment, 2024)
