= The Wee Trio =

American jazz band

- Origin: New York City
- Genres: Jazz
- Years active: 2008–present
- Labels: Bionic
- Members: James Westfall; Dan Loomis; Jared Schonig
- Website: theweetrio.com

The Wee Trio is an American jazz band.

The Wee Trio is composed of three instrumentalists: James Westfall on vibraphone and marimba, Dan Loomis on acoustic bass, and Jared Schonig on drums. Their debut recording in 2008 was Capitol Diner, Vol. 1, which received international attention and was listed as one of the top 10 albums of the year by The San Francisco Chronicle, Boston’s Patriot Ledger and All About Jazz.

The trio, which calls both Nashville and New York City home, has performed at such venues and festivals as The New Orleans Jazz and Heritage Festival, Birdland, The Kennedy Center, The Rochester International Jazz Festival, Yoshi’s SF, The Green Mill, The Burlington Jazz Festival, Jazz At The Bistro, The Ottawa Jazz Festival, Le Poisson Rouge, and Snug Harbor.

In 2012, The Wee Trio unveiled a new project, Ashes To Ashes: A David Bowie Intraspective, which reimagines the work of David Bowie and introduced The Wee Trio to a new audience.

The Wee Trio’s fall 2013 release, Live At The Bistro, was chosen as one of Downbeat’s top jazz albums of 2014 and according to All About Jazz captures the group’s "lightning in a bottle" live sound and their deep musical connection over two sold-out nights at St. Louis club, Jazz At The Bistro.

The band’s recent release, Wee + 3, features trumpeter Nicholas Payton, pianist Fabian Almazan, and guitarist Nir Felder.

== Discography ==
- WEE + 3 (2016)
- Live At The Bistro (2013)
- Ashes to Ashes: A David Bowie Intraspective (2012)
- Capitol Diner Vol. 2 (2010)
- Capitol Diner Vol. 1 (2008)

== Members ==
- James Westfall, vibraphone
- Dan Loomis, bass
- Jared Schonig, drums
