= Zero Effect =

- Theatrical release poster
- Directed by: Jake Kasdan
- Written by: Jake Kasdan
- Based on: "A Scandal in Bohemia" by Arthur Conan Doyle
- Produced by: Lisa Henson; Jake Kasdan; Janet Yang
- Starring: Bill Pullman; Ben Stiller; Kim Dickens; Angela Featherstone; Ryan O'Neal
- Cinematography: Bill Pope
- Edited by: Tara Timpone
- Music by: The Greyboy Allstars
- Production company: Castle Rock Entertainment
- Distributed by: Columbia Pictures
- Release date: January 30, 1998
- Running time: 116 minutes
- Country: United States
- Language: English
- Budget: $5 million
- Box office: $2 million (US)

Zero Effect is a 1998 American mystery comedy film written and directed by Jake Kasdan in his feature directorial debut. Starring Bill Pullman as "the world's most private detective", Daryl Zero, and Ben Stiller as his assistant Steve Arlo, the film's plot is loosely based on the Arthur Conan Doyle short story "A Scandal in Bohemia".

Shot in Portland, Oregon and scored by The Greyboy Allstars, the film was screened in the Un Certain Regard section at the 1998 Cannes Film Festival.

The film was released by Columbia Pictures on January 30, 1998 and received positive reviews from critics, grossing $2 million with a budget of $5 million.

== Plot ==
Daryl Zero is the world's greatest detective, but is also a socially maladroit misanthrope. Among his quirks is that he never meets or has direct contact with his clients, instead conducting business through his assistant, Steve Arlo. Throughout the movie, Zero provides narration as he reads lines from his proposed autobiography.

Zero and Arlo are hired by Portland area millionaire Gregory Stark, who has lost the key to a safe deposit box and is being blackmailed by an unknown person who forces him to follow elaborate instructions to deliver the cash payments. Zero quickly discovers that the blackmailer is Gloria Sullivan, a paramedic with a mysterious past. Zero becomes attracted to Gloria and they sleep together, compromising his trademark objectivity. He lets his guard down and tells her that his mother was killed by his abusive father, who later committed suicide.

Stark pressures Arlo to reveal the blackmailer's identity so that he can have that person killed. Arlo must also deal with Zero's absurd demands on his time, which increasingly interfere with Arlo's relationship with his girlfriend Jess.

Zero eventually discovers that Stark had raped Gloria's mother after she broke up with him. She later blackmailed Stark with the threat of exposing him as a rapist, so he had her killed. However, she had already given birth to their daughter Gloria, who was discovered and raised by the hitman who killed her mother. Gloria grew up knowing that Stark was behind her mother's murder, and when her adoptive father (the hitman) contracted a terminal illness, she used the information to blackmail Stark, using the money to pay for medical treatment.

At the meeting to deliver the final blackmail payment, Stark collapses from a heart attack and Gloria is compelled to save his life. She then flees the country with Zero's assistance.

== Cast ==
- Bill Pullman as Daryl Zero
- Ben Stiller as Steve Arlo
- Ryan O'Neal as Gregory Stark
- Kim Dickens as Gloria Sullivan
- Angela Featherstone as Jess
- Matt O'Toole as Kragan Vincent
- Sarah DeVincentis as Daisy
- Hugh Ross as Bill

== Production ==
In April 1997, Castle Rock Entertainment acquired Zero Effect written by Jake Kasdan with Bill Pullman and Ben Stiller with Kasdan set to make his feature debut after having previously directed theater productions. Kasdan wrote the character of Daryl Zero specifically with Pullman in mind.

== Soundtrack ==
Released in January 1998 on Work Group, the official soundtrack for the film includes:

1. "Mystery Dance" – Elvis Costello
2. "One Dance" – Dan Bern
3. "Starbucked" – Bond
4. "Into My Arms" – Nick Cave and the Bad Seeds
5. "Some Jingle Jangle Morning" – Mary Lou Lord
6. "Emma J" – Brendan Benson
7. "The Method Pt. 2" – The Greyboy Allstars
8. "Drifting Along" – Jamiroquai
9. "Till You Die" – Candy Butchers
10. "Lounge" – Esthero
11. "Blackmail Drop" – The Greyboy Allstars
12. "Three Days" – Thermadore
13. "Rest My Head Against the Wall" – Heatmiser
14. "The Zero Effect" – The Greyboy Allstars

== Reception ==
Rotten Tomatoes, a review aggregator, reports that 66% of 56 surveyed critics gave the film a positive review; the average rating is 6.8/10. The site's consensus reads: "A promising debut for writer/director Jake Kasdan, Zero Effect overcomes its flaws with its off-kilter humor and likeable leads." Leonard Klady of Variety called it "scattershot entertainment that misses as often as it hits its targets". Roger Ebert of the Chicago Sun-Times rated 3.5/4 stars and wrote that he was surprised by how involved he became in the film. Janet Maslin of The New York Times wrote of the film's focus on the relation between Pullman and Stiller, "For all its admirable ambitions, this loosely focused first feature has the makings of a better buddy story than detective tale anyhow." Jack Matthews of the Los Angeles Times called it "a confident first film and one of the freshest detective yarns to come along in a while". Ruthe Stein of The San Francisco Chronicle rated it 2/4 stars and called it "more an interesting idea for a detective movie than it is an interesting film". Lisa Schwarzbaum of Entertainment Weekly rated it C+ and called it "a very shaggy and minor comedy". Geoff Andrew of Time Out London wrote, "Kasdan's is a very promising debut, its own dearth of feeling offset by able writing, engaging playing and a sure sense of pace."

Audiences polled by CinemaScore gave the film an average grade of "C+" on an A+ to F scale.

== Television pilot ==
In 2002, Kasdan attempted to resurrect the character Daryl Zero for the NBC television network. He shared the screenwriting duties with Walon Green and directed the pilot. He was also one of the producers. The series was intended to be a prequel, tracing the early adventures of Zero as he and Arlo became a team. The pilot stars Alan Cumming as Zero and David Julian Hirsh as the Arlo character, renamed Jeff Winslow. The cast also features Krista Allen and Natasha Gregson Wagner. NBC did not pick up the pilot.
