= Direct Axecess =

Direct AXEcess

Studio album by Steve Masakowski
- Released: 1995
- Recorded: September 1994
- Genre: Jazz
- Length: 56:46
- Label: Blue Note Records
- Producer: David Torkanowsky

Steve Masakowski chronology
| What It Was (1993) | Direct AXEcess (1995) | Live At Snug Harbor (1999) |

Direct AXEcess is an album by the American jazz guitarist Steve Masakowski of performances recorded in 1994 for the Blue Note Records label.

== Reception ==
Direct AXEcess received a positive review in DownBeat magazine.

== Track listing ==
All compositions by Steve Masakowski except as indicated

1. "Paladia" – 3:40
2. "Burgundy" – 5:24
3. "(Voluntary) Simplicity" – 5:31
4. "Monk's Mood" (Thelonious Monk) – 2:20
5. "Kayak" (Kenny Wheeler) – 8:00
6. "Headed Wes’" – 6:21
7. "Emily" (Johnny Mandel) – 2:57
8. "Ascending Reverence" – 5:48
9. "Lush Life" (Billy Strayhorn) – 5:01
10. "For Django" (Joe Pass) – 4:07
11. "Bayou St. John" – 5:08
12. "The Visit" (Pat Martino) – 4:25
13. "New Orleans" (Hoagy Carmichael) – 2:24

Recorded at The Boiler Room, New Orleans, September 1994

== Personnel ==
- Steve Masakowski – seven-string guitar
- Hank Mackie – guitar
- David Torkanowsky – piano
- Bill Huntington – acoustic bass
- James Singleton – acoustic bass
- Brian Blade – drums
