= Spacesuit (album) =

Studio album by Robert Walter
- Released: 2018
- Recorded: January 2017 in New Orleans
- Genre: Jazz
- Length: 36:23
- Label: Royal Potato Family
- Producer: Robert Walter

Robert Walter chronology
Get Thy Bearings (2013)	Spacesuit (2018)

Spacesuit is an album by keyboardist Robert Walter. It was composed in the spirit of group improvisations that happen at the band's live shows, according to Walter. The album was recording in January 2017 over the span of a few days at The Parlor Studio in New Orleans.

"The material stretches beyond its usual structure and we wanted to capture that in the studio. Most of my music in the past has been heavily influenced by classic jazz and funk. While still retaining that tradition as a springboard we started to move into a place that was less reverent to conventions of genre. By combining a wider set of influences, both musical and visual, the songs on Spacesuit are meant to reflect and encourage our recent explorations."

"I tried to recapture those early feelings of imagination and wonder. My inspirations for this recording are early Fusion, Krautrock, Dub Reggae, the films of Alejandro Jodorowsky and Stanley Kubrick, and the images of Chris Foss, Moebius and H.R. Giger."

== Track listing ==
1. "Spacesuit" - :24
2. "Nerva and Dumbo" - 5:12
3. "Posthuman" - 4:53
4. "13th Key" - 4:22
5. "Emanate" - 4:01
6. "Modifier" - 1:09
7. "Chalk Giant" - 4:27
8. "Current Futures" - 4:37
9. "Most Of All Of Us" - 6:03
10. "Electric Blanket" (hidden track) - :57

== Personnel ==
MUSICIANS

- Robert Walter - Hammond organ, Fender Rhodes, Wurlitzer, piano, clavinet,
- Simon Lott - drums
- Victor Little - bass
- Mike Dillon - percussion
