= Norman Beaker =

English blues musician (born 1950)

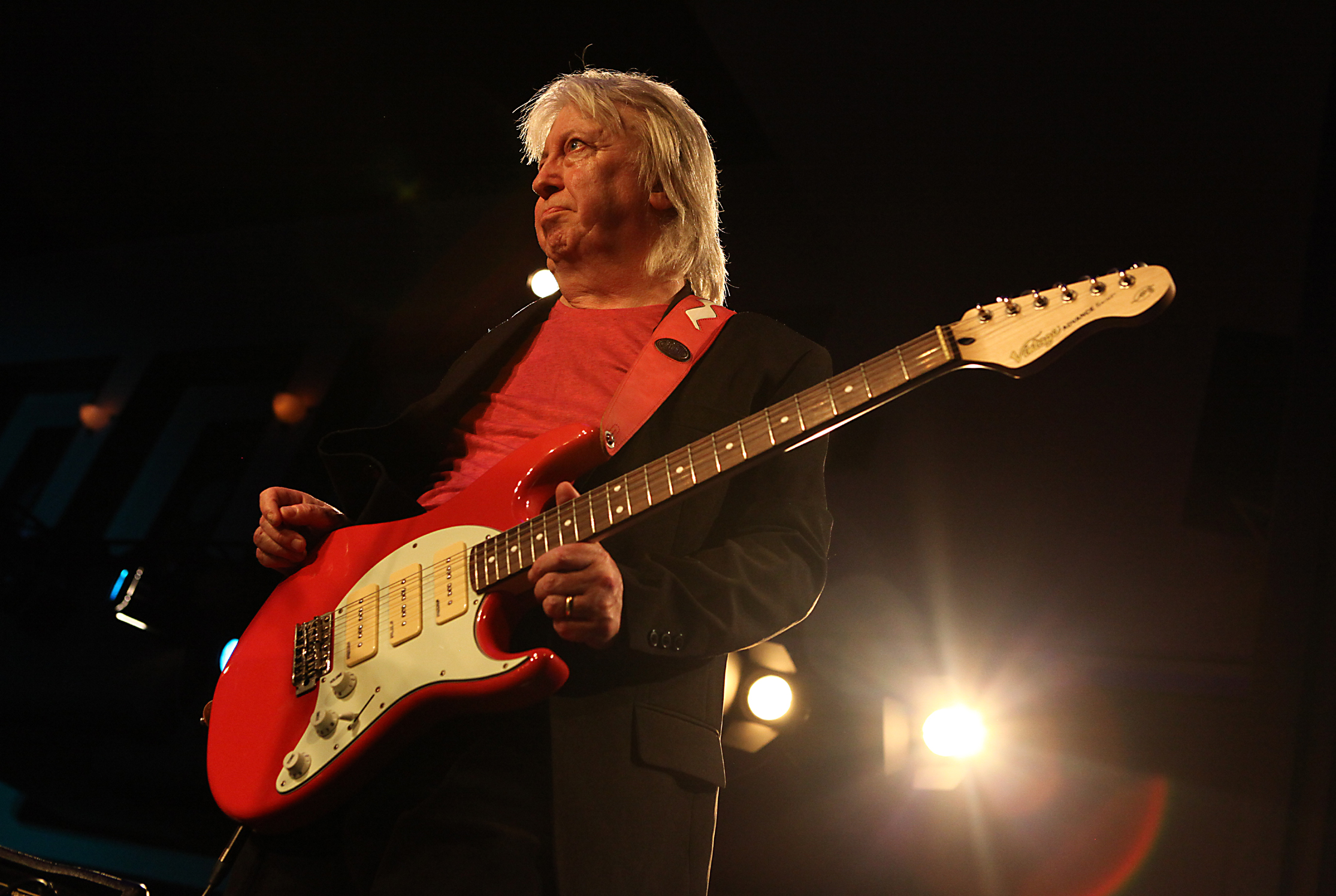
- Beaker, 2015

Background information
- Born: Norman Hume; 21 June 1950 (age 76); Manchester, England
- Genres: Blues; blues rock
- Instruments: Electric guitar; vocals
- Years active: 1967–present
- Labels: JSP; Out of Time; JNR; Clock; Rock Svirke
- Website: normanbeaker.com

Norman Beaker (born Norman Hume; 21 June 1950) is a blues guitarist, vocalist, songwriter, band leader and record producer who has been involved in the British blues scene since the early 1970s.

The Norman Beaker Band has toured and recorded with many blues artists including Graham Bond, Jack Bruce, Chuck Berry, Jimmy Rogers, Alexis Korner, Buddy Guy, Lowell Fulson, Fenton Robinson and B. B. King. Beaker has toured regularly with Chris Farlowe, Larry Garner and Van Morrison. He has contributed as a session guitarist to many recordings including Jack Bruce, Lowell Fulson, James Booker and Van Morrison.

In January 2017, Beaker was inducted as a "Legendary Blues Artist from England" into the Blues Hall of Fame.

== Biography and musical career ==
=== 1960s and 1970s ===
At the age of seven Beaker taught himself playing the guitar when he was confined to bed for 18 months after a serious road accident. In a holiday camp competition, at the age of twelve, he won the first prize which was ten shillings and an appearance on the Lonnie Donegan show. Taking part in a few more shows of the “skiffle king” was the beginning of Norman’s career on stage. Lonnie Donegan and Hank Marvin were his first influences, but soon his elder brother Malcolm introduced him to the work of blues artists like Howlin Wolf, Jimmy Reed, Muddy Waters and Sonny Boy Williamson. In 1967 Beaker formed his first band, called Morning After, which included his brother Malcolm Hume on drums, John McCormick on rhythm guitar, Mike Corrigan on keyboard, and Ian Stocks on bass. The band recorded the album Blue Blood in 1971.

After several years of gigging in the late sixties and early seventies, Beaker eventually joined Victor Brox's Blues Train, which meant appearing on Granada TV in the show So It Goes.

In 1977, Beaker formed a new band called No Mystery named after the Chick Corea album and song No Mystery. The band members besides Beaker were Dave Lunt on bass, Tim Franks (drums) and John Dickinson on second guitar, later Balis Novak joined on keyboards, and Lenni 'Sax' Zaksen from Sad Café on sax. The idea was to play more experimental music. But soon the band returned to the blues, as they were asked to back Louisiana Red on the TV programme, The Old Grey Whistle Test. The band supported many artists guesting such as James Booker, Alexis Korner, Jack Bruce, Tommy Tucker and Zoot Money. In 1979, No Mystery with Victor Brox and harmonica player Johnny Mars became the first UK blues band to play in East Germany.

=== 1980 to present ===
In 1981, No Mystery released a single "Taxman's Wine" produced by Ray Russell. In 1982, the band dissolved.

In 1985, after touring with former Cream member Jack Bruce and producing many albums for various other musicians, Beaker formed the Norman Beaker Band, which included Kevin Hill (bass), Lenni 'Sax' Zaksen (saxophone), Dave Bainbridge (keyboards), and Tim Franks (drums). The band released the live album Bought in the Act in 1986 and recorded "I Once Was a Gambler" with Phil Guy. Eventually, the band became the houseband for many visiting US artists.

In 1994, Beaker was the organiser of the Alexis Korner Memorial Concert, which was held annually for the next nine years at Buxton Opera House in Derbyshire. The 1994 Concert brought a reunion of Robert Plant and Jimmy Page from Led Zeppelin, and featured, among others, Dick Heckstall-Smith and Chris Barber. Later gigs at Buxton - all of them organized by Beaker - featured Fleetwood Mac founder Peter Green, Chris Farlowe, Eric Burdon and many others.

In the 1990s, Beaker started producing albums for Del Taylor's Indigo label, amongst them Chris Farlowe's live album Lonesome Road (1995). Here former 10cc drummer Paul Burgess joined the band. In 1996, the Norman Beaker Band backed Ruby Turner for her album Guilty and Mick Abraham for his Mick's Back album with Tim Franks on drums and Sheila Gott (vocals). Touring all over Europe with Chris Farlowe continued for the next two decades. A live recording on the German TV series Rockpalast with Farlowe in 2006 appeared on CD and video.

The backing line-up of the Norman Beaker Band in 2016 was Nick Steed - keyboards, Kim Nishikawara - saxophone, John Price - bass guitar, Steve Gibson - drums. Occasional members are Tony Kelly, Dave Lewis and Damian Hand (all sax), with Steve Hallworth (trumpet).

== Autobiography ==
On 14 November 2022, Beaker published his autobiography, Manchester Evening Blues.

== Discography ==
- 1989: Into the Blues, JSP Records
- 1989: Modern Days, Lonely Nights, JSP Records (variant title of above)
- 1999: The Older I Get, The Better I Was, Out of Time Records
- 2002: Who's He Calling Me Him?, Delicious Records
- 2010: Larry Garner, Norman Beaker and Friends - Live at the Tivoli (Recorded at The Tivoli Theatre, Wimborne on 8 October 2009)
- 2013: Larry Garner & The Norman Beaker Band - Good Night in Vienna (Recorded at Reigen, Vienna on 16 April 2013)
- 2013: Between The Lines
- 2015: Live in Belgrade, Norman Beaker Blues Trio, Jnr/CD Baby
- 2017: We See Us Later, Norman Beaker Band
- 2020: Running Down The Clock, Norman Beaker (with John Price and Leo Andjelkovic)

== Honours ==
- On 18 January 2017, Beaker was officially recognized and inducted as a "Legendary Blues Artist from England" into a Blues Hall of Fame registered in San Diego, California, US.
