= Sasha Masakowski =

American jazz singer (born 1986)

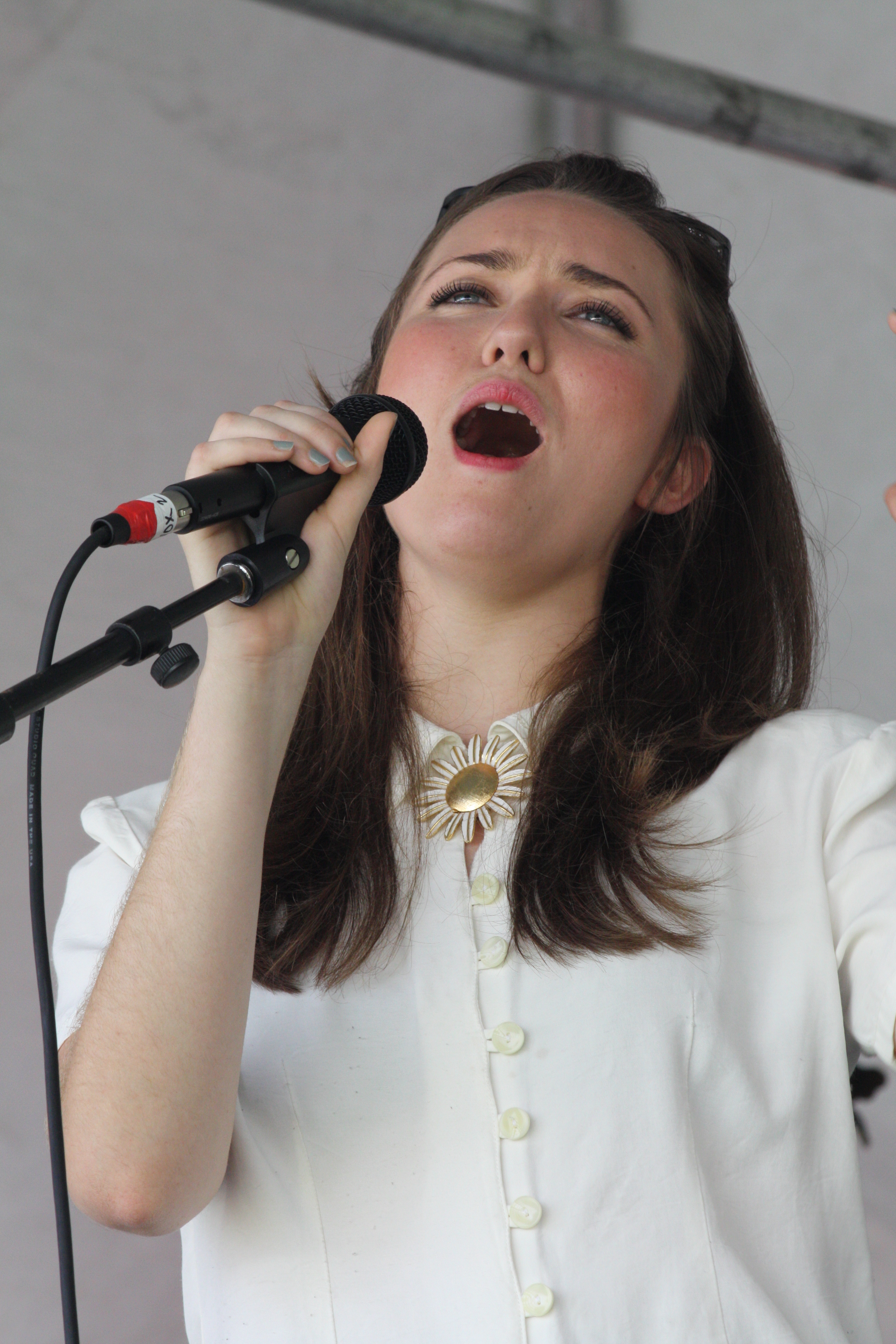

Background information
- Born: 1986 (age 39–40); New Orleans, Louisiana, U.S.
- Genre: Jazz
- Occupation: Singer
- Years active: 1990s–present
- Label: Ropeadope
- Website: sashamasakowski.com

Sasha Masakowski (born 1986) is an American jazz singer. She was born in New Orleans and is the daughter of jazz guitarist Steve Masakowski and concert pianist Ulrike Antonie Sprenger. She heard jazz at an early age due to her father's association with Ellis Marsalis Jr.

She attended the University of New Orleans, where her father led the Jazz Studies department.

She names as influences Bobby McFerrin, Rachelle Ferrell, and Flora Purim. She performs in the Masakowski Family Band with her father and her brother Martin, who plays bass and is part of her Art Market band. Her debut album Wishes (Hypersoul, 2011) was recorded with and produced by pianist James Westfall.

In 2026 she produced Two Worlds, an album billed as Steve Masakowski Family & Friends, featuring her father, her brother Martin, saxophonist Rex Gregory, pianist Oscar Rossignoli and drummer Brian Blade.

== Awards and honors ==
- Nominated Best Female Vocalist and Best Emerging Artist, Offbeat magazine, 2009

== Discography ==
- Wishes (Hypersoul, 2011)
- Old Green River (2015)
- Hildegard with Hildegard (2015)
- N.O. Escape with Masakowski Family (2016)
- Art Market (Ropeadope, 2018)
- Have Yourself a Merry Little Christmas with Masakowski Family (2020)

=== As guest ===
- Irvin Mayfield, New Orleans Jazz Playhouse (Basin Street, 2015)
- Now vs. Now, The Buffering Cocoon (Jazzland, 2018)
- Nicholas Payton, Quarantined with Nick (Paytone, 2020)
