= Resurrection of the Bayou Maharajah =

Live album by James Booker
- Released: 1993
- Venue: Maple Leaf Bar
- Genres: New Orleans rhythm and blues, blues, jazz
- Label: Rounder
- Producers: Scott Billington, John Parsons

James Booker chronology
Let's Make a Better World (1991)	Resurrection of the Bayou Maharajah (1993)	Spiders on the Keys (1993)

Resurrection of the Bayou Maharajah is a posthumous live album by the American musician James Booker, released in 1993. It was accompanied by the all-instrumental Spiders on the Keys.

== Production ==
Resurrection of the Bayou Maharajah was produced by Scott Billington and John Parsons. The songs were recorded at the Maple Leaf Bar between 1972 and 1982, and were chosen from around 60 hours of recordings. "Save Your Love for Me" is a cover of the Buddy Johnson song. "Gitanarias" is a version of the Ernesto Lecuona composition. "Minute Waltz" was composed by Frédéric Chopin. "Medley: Tico Tico/Papa Was a Rascal" contains a snippet of "Royal Garden Blues", as well as a discourse on the powers of the CIA.

== Critical reception ==
Professional ratings
Review scores
Source	Rating
AllMusic	4/5 stars
Robert Christgau	(3-star Honorable Mention)
MusicHound Rock: The Essential Album Guide	4/5 stars
Orlando Sentinel	4/5 stars
The Penguin Guide to Blues Recordings	3.5/4 stars
Pittsburgh Post-Gazette	3/4 stars
The Virgin Encyclopedia of R&B and Soul	3/5 stars

The Orlando Sentinel wrote that Booker's "high, vinegary voice takes a little getting used to, but its endearing flaws make an interesting contrast to the tumbling fluidity of his playing." The Chicago Tribune said that the album "engagingly capture[s] the late keyboardist's eclectic wizardry." The New York Times noted that "the standout numbers ... toss off barbs of wit and anguish that strike with casual precision... Booker's voice is anemic at times, and while he can command an ardent falsetto, he knows it is no match for his left hand, which takes over near the end."

The Pittsburgh Post-Gazette deemed the album "eclectic and unpredictable, with musical mood swings a mile wide." The Boston Globe called "Junco Partner" "8.5 minutes of stomping, killing blues rumba." The Star Tribune labeled the songs "alternately raw, lyrical, poignant, joyous and achingly sad."

AllMusic wrote that Booker "is at his best here ... focused and intense in his playing, wildly passionate on both keyboards and vocals." MusicHound Rock: The Essential Album Guide praised Booker's "total lack of inhibition or playing it safe." In 2002, Keyboard stated that "Booker's arpeggios and fancy trills belie his back-alley delivery; he was capable of astonishing two-handed interplay."

== Track listing ==
No.	Title	Length
1.	"Medley: Slow Down/Bony Maronie/Knock on Wood/I Heard It Through the Grapevine/Classified"
2.	"Medley: Tico Tico/Papa Was a Rascal"
3.	"Medley: Lawdy Miss Clawdy/Ballad at the Maple Leaf"
4.	"Minute Waltz"
5.	"All by Myself"
6.	"Save Your Love for Me"
7.	"Junco Partner"
8.	"St. James Infirmary"
9.	"Gitanarias"
10.	"Medley: Life/Wine Spo-Dee-O-Dee/It Should Have Been Me"
11.	"Pop's Dilemma/Irene Goodnight"
