= The Greyboy Allstars =

American Soul jazz band

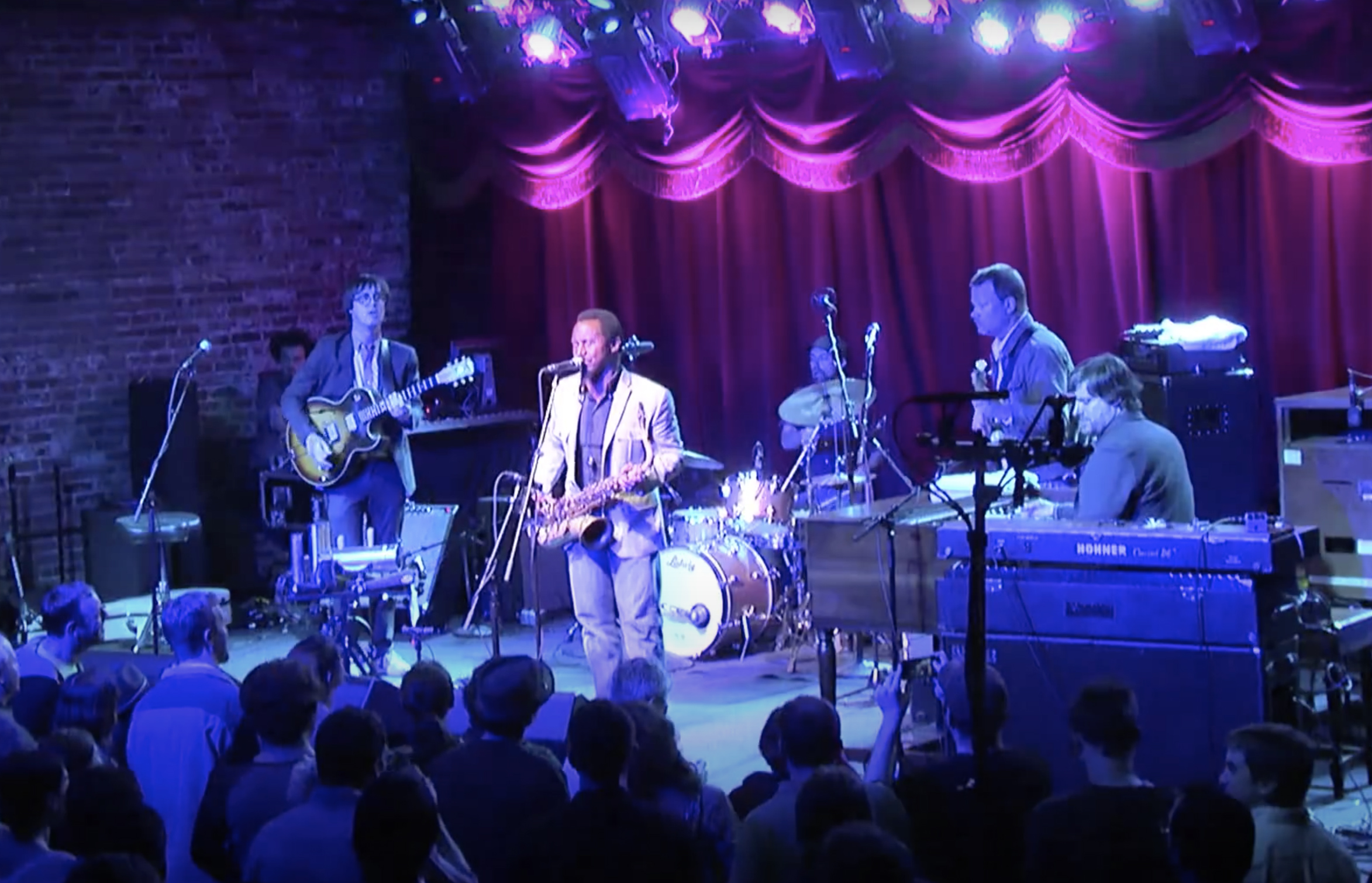
- The Greyboy Allstars 2011 Brooklyn

Background information
- Also known as: GBA
- Origin: San Diego, California, U.S.
- Genres: Soul Jazz, Acid Jazz
- Years active: 1993–present
- Label: Knowledge Room Recordings
- Members: Karl Denson; Robert Walter; Chris Stillwell; Elgin Park; Aaron Redfield
- Past members: Zak Najor; Alan Evans; DJ Greyboy; Eric Kalb
- Website: www.greyboyallstars.com

The Greyboy Allstars are an American soul-jazz band from San Diego, California, United States, whose current members include Karl Denson on Saxophone, Robert Walter on Keys, Mike Andrews (under the pseudonym Elgin Park) on guitar, Chris Stillwell on bass and Aaron Redfield on drums. They have released eight albums to date.

== History ==
Initially formed in 1993 as the backing band for rare groove luminary DJ Greyboy. DJ Greyboy and saxophonist Karl Denson (who was touring with Lenny Kravitz at the time) collaborated on two tracks for Ubiquity Records' Home Cookin' compilation, and then worked on Greyboy's 1994 solo album for Ubiquity, Freestylin'. After forming their own label, Greyboy Records, the duo gradually amassed members for a house band".

The founding members included Denson, guitarist Mike Andrews (under the pseudonym Elgin Park), keyboardist Robert Walter, bassist Chris Stillwell, and drummer Zak Najor. The Greyboy Allstars started playing weekly at San Diego's now defunct Green Circle, weekends at San Francisco's Elbo Room and various clubs throughout Europe.

Their debut album, West Coast Boogaloo, was self-released in 1994, and featured Fred Wesley on Trombone of James Brown fame. Several years later, Live was released, followed by Town Called Earth in 1997. In 1998, the band scored Jake Kasdan's movie Zero Effect, under the direction of Mike Andrews. After dominating the jam-jazz scene of the ’90s, "the band parted ways in late 1999 to allow its members to take the creative steps necessary to stay musically fresh." and drummer Zak Najor officially departed the touring group.

In 2007, the original band (including Najor) reunited in the studio and released their third album, What Happened to Television?;. Robert Walter revealed that “Zak is not touring with us anymore, he is on the album and he is a big part of the album, but he just doesn’t want to go on the road at all.” The band played several live shows with new drummers including Eric Kalb and Alan Evans (from Soulive) before current GBA drummer and San Diego native Aaron Redfield officially joined the band.

Inland Emperor, the band's next studio album, was released in 2013.

In June 2017, the band published several photos from recording sessions for their latest record and announced that a new album was coming. On December 17, the band released a track called "Rudolph’s Lament", described as "one of our favorite tunes from the outtakes bin... a spacey Waltz that found itself as an outlier on our upcoming release." 2018 saw the band return to soundtrack work with Mike Andrews for the Jennifer Lopez film Second Act.

In June 2020, the band officially announced that their next studio album, Como De Allstars, and first in seven years, would be released July 3, 2020. They released the first single "Como De Allstars". Elgin Park shared: “I think it’s more important to remember the power we all have to make change in our own lives and society in general. We made the point at the time because we felt it was relevant then, but in extreme times like these, we’re reminded that the power of our collective voice is needed more than ever.”

Their classic and long out of print album West Coast Boogaloo was reissued and released on vinyl by Light in the Attic on August 7, 2020. August 2021 saw the announcement of Soul Dream, and four-part livestream concert specials. The first installment aired Friday, August 20 with the subsequent shows premiering each Friday in the following weeks. The series was filmed and recorded at Elgin Park Recordings in Glendale, CA. In August 2022, the band's classic 1997 album A Town Called Earth was reissued/remastered and available on vinyl for the first time.

== Discography ==
=== Albums ===
- West Coast Boogaloo (with Fred Wesley) [1994] Greyboy Records/[2021] Knowledge Room Recordings
- A Town Called Earth [1997] Greyboy Records/[2022] Knowledge Room Recordings
- GBA Live - [1999] Relaxed Records
- What Happened to Television? - [2007] SCI Fidelity Records
- Inland Emperor - [2013] Knowledge Room Recordings
- Como De Allstars - [2020] Knowledge Room Recordings
- Get a Job: Music From The Original Broadcast Series Soul Dream - [2022] Knowledge Room Recordings
- Grab Bag: 2007-2023 - [2024] Knowledge Room Recordings

=== Singles ===
- Jungle Strut - [1994] Explorations Into Dancefloor Jazz Vol. 1
- Rudolph's Lament - [2018] self-released
- Como De Allstars - [2020] Knowledge Room Recordings
- A Town Called Earth - Live - [2022] Knowledge Room Recordings
- I've Got Reasons - [2022] Knowledge Room Recordings
- Happy Friends - [2022] Knowledge Room Recordings
- Slip The Grip - [2024] Knowledge Room Recordings
- Suadela - [2024] Knowledge Room Recordings
- Boxes - [2024] Knowledge Room Recordings

=== Soundtracks ===
- Zero Effect - [1998] Various Artists
- Second Act - [2018] Various Artists (credited as Michael Andrews)
