= Cure All =

Studio album by Robert Walter
- Released: 2008
- Recorded: June 25–27, 2007 by Matt Balitsaris at Maggie's Farm Recording
- Genre: Jazz
- Length: 51:12
- Label: Palmetto
- Producer: Robert Walter, Matt Balitsaris

Robert Walter chronology
| Super Heavy Organ (2005) | Cure All (2008) |

Cure All is an album by keyboardist Robert Walter. The recording features James Singleton (bass) and Johnny Vidacovich (drums). AllMusic states that Cure All is soul-jazz with "a healthy balance of intellect and funkiness". All About Jazz states Cure All's "simplicity is refreshing rather than predictable" and that Walter's sidemen for the album are known for their appreciation for the spirit of New Orleans.

== Track listing ==
1. "Snakes and Spiders" - 4:31
2. "Money Changes" - 3:11
3. "Cure All" - 3:26
4. "Coupe" - 3:31
5. "Scores of Spores" - 4:07
6. "Parts and Holes" - 5:36
7. "Rivers of Babylon" - 3:23
8. "Maple Plank" - 4:16
9. "Box of Glass" - 2:23
10. "Measure Up" - 3:25
11. "Hillary Street" - 4:16
12. "Bulldog Run" - 5:26
13. "T" - 3:40

== Personnel ==
- Robert Walter - Hammond organ, Fender Rhodes, piano, clavinet, percussion
- James Singleton - double bass
- Johnny Vidacovich - drums, cymbals
