= Steve Masakowski =

American guitarist, educator, and inventor

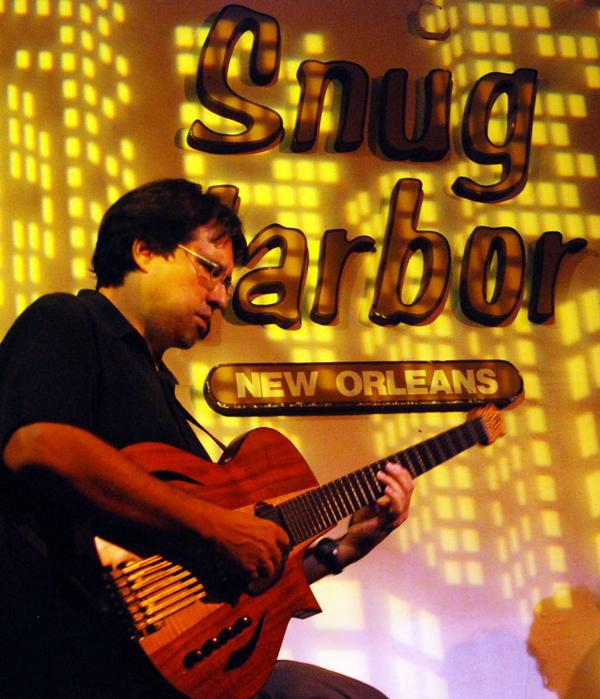

Background information
- Born: Stephen Alphonse Masakowski; September 2, 1954 (age 72); New Orleans, Louisiana, U.S.
- Genres: Jazz, jazz fusion, Afro-Cuban, Brazilian
- Occupations: Musician, educator
- Instruments: Guitar, 7-string guitar, keytar
- Years active: 1970s–present
- Label: Blue Note
- Website: www.steve-masakowski.com

Steve Masakowski (born September 2, 1954) is an American jazz guitarist, educator, and inventor. He invented the guitar-based keytar and the switch pick, and has designed three custom-built seven-string guitars. He developed an approach to playing the guitar by using his pick design, allowing him to switch from fingerpicking to flatpicking.

He has released solo albums and has worked with Johnny Adams, Mose Allison, Dave Liebman, Ellis Marsalis, Jr., Carl Fontana, Rick Margitza, Bobby McFerrin, Nicholas Payton, Dianne Reeves, Sam Rivers, Woody Shaw, Alvin Tyler, and Bennie Wallace. Since 1987, he has been a member of the band Astral Project.

He has been voted Best Guitarist twice and included as a member of Astral Project in the Best Contemporary Jazz Group three times by Gambit and Offbeat magazines in their annual readers' poll. He has published lessons in Guitar Player magazine and wrote the book Jazz Ear Training – Learning to Hear Your Way Through Music for Mel Bay Publications. He has also been recognized by Down Beat magazine as Guitar Talent Deserving Wider Recognition.

== Career ==
=== Early life ===
Masakowski was born in New Orleans, Louisiana, on September 2, 1954. The Beatles influenced his desire to play guitar. When he was fourteen, he played bass guitar and co-founded the band Truth, which was based on the rock band Cream. In high school he became interested in composing, and he started taking guitar lessons to learn about harmony. His teacher introduced him to the music of jazz guitarists Joe Pass, Wes Montgomery, Pat Martino, and Lenny Breau.

He went to the Berklee College of Music in 1974, studying music theory, arranging, and composition. After getting his degree, he returned to New Orleans with his girlfriend, jazz guitarist Emily Remler, and founded the group Fourplay (not to be confused with the later jazz group of the same name). From 1976 to 1978, he studied classical composition and orchestration with Bert Braud, a teacher at the New Orleans Center for Creative Arts who also taught Terence Blanchard, Lauren Bernofsky, Harry Connick, Jr., Branford Marsalis, and Wynton Marsalis.

=== Returning to New Orleans ===
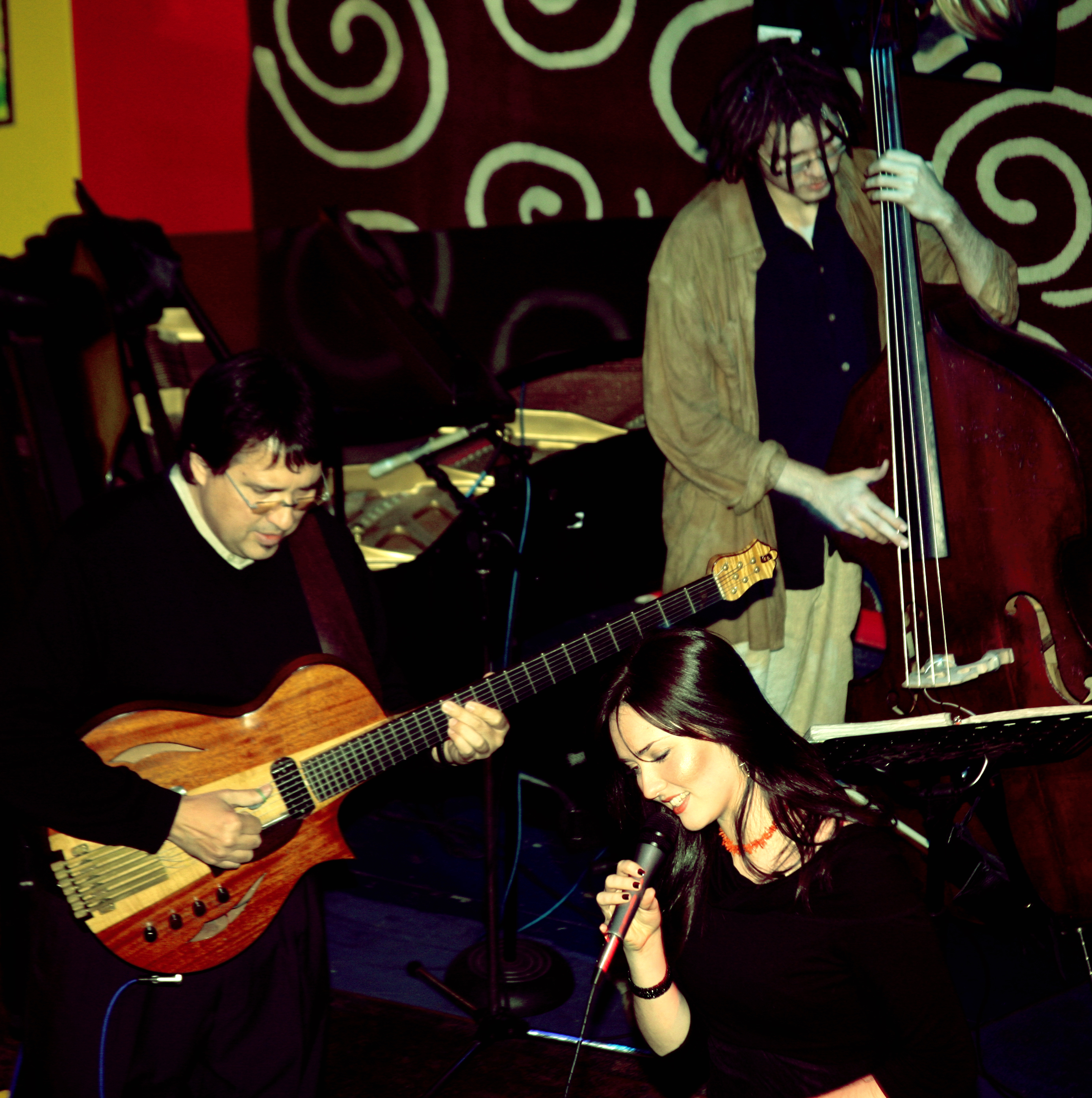
Steve Masakowski with his son Martin on double bass and his daughter Sasha on vocals

In the early 1980s, Masakowski played regularly with local New Orleans musicians such as Earl Turbinton, Jr., Alvin Tyler, and Willie Tee. With Singleton and drummer Johnny Vidacovich, he accompanied visiting musicians such as Randy Brecker, Tom Harrell, Art Baron, and Dave Liebman. He founded the group Mars with Larry Sieberth (keyboards), James Singleton (bass), and James Black (drums). The band played a mixture of jazz and electronic music, sometimes combined with visual art created by Jon Graubarth. Dave Liebman played on the first Mars album (1983).

In 1982, Masakowski founded the Composers Recording Studio with harpist Patrice Fisher, guitarist Jimmy Robinson, and violinist Denise Villere. He often acted as audio engineer and sometimes record producer. The studio lasted about ten years and recorded Harry Connick Jr., Ellis Marsalis Jr., Tony Dagradi, the Dirty Dozen Brass Band, and pianist James Drew.

For three years, Masakowski worked in a duet with pianist Ellis Marsalis, Jr. In 1987, he joined Astral Project. From 1993–1996, he toured with singer Dianne Reeves. He leads the band Nova NOLA, whose members include his son, double bassist Martin, and his daughter, vocalist Sasha Masakowski. He released two albums for Blue Note Records: What It Was (1994) and Direct AXEcess (1995). New Orleans guitarist, banjoist, and historian Danny Barker wrote the liner notes for What It Was. When Barker died in 1994, he bequeathed his acoustic guitar to Masakowski.

Masakowski was hired by Marsalis to teach in the jazz program at the University of New Orleans (UNO). In 1991, he became a full-time faculty member. After the retirement of Marsalis and a short tenure by Terence Blanchard, he became Chair of Jazz Studies and director of the jazz program in 2004. Masakowski retired from UNO in 2022.

=== Inventions ===
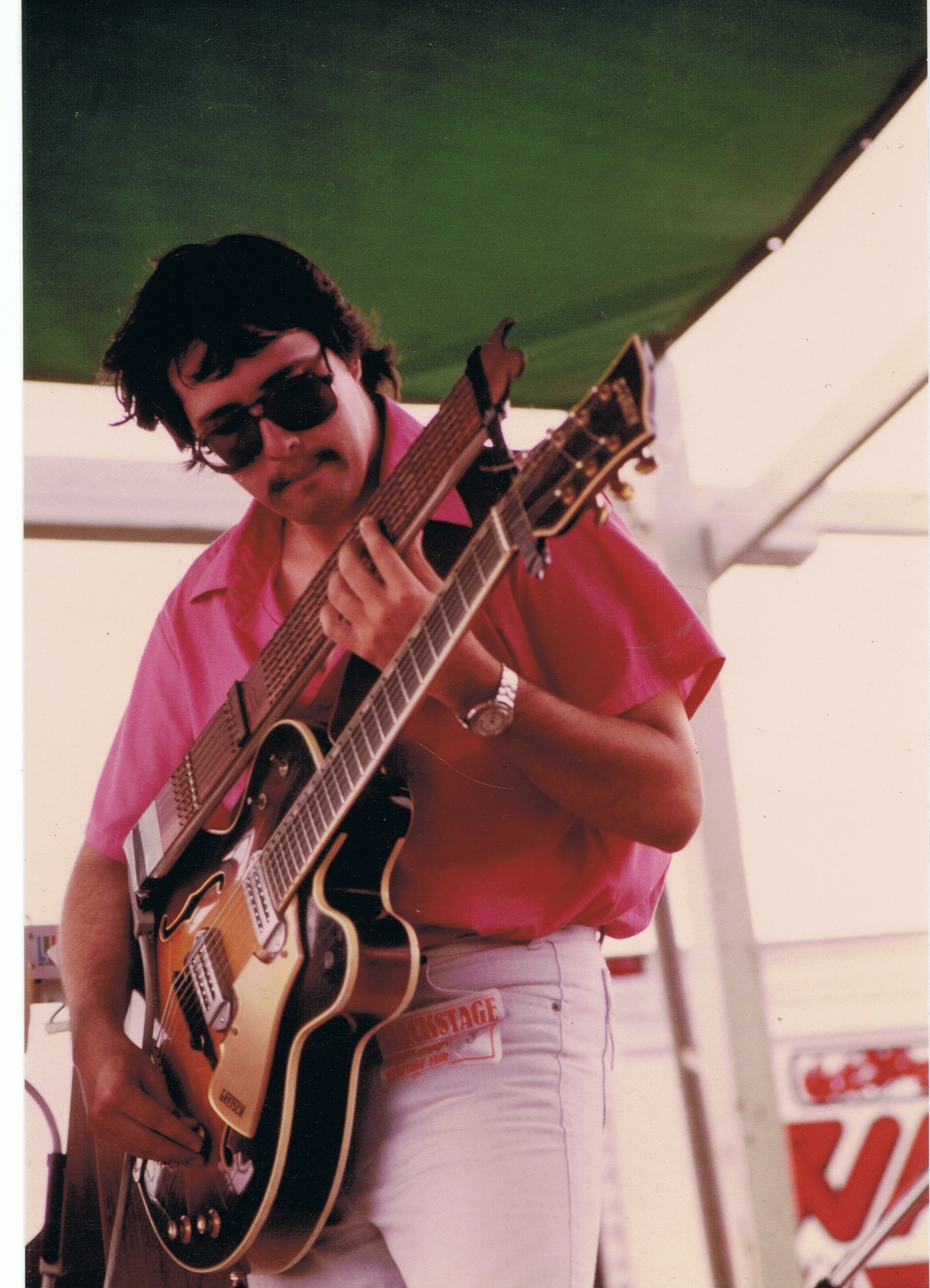
Masakowski with his keytar above a seven-string guitar

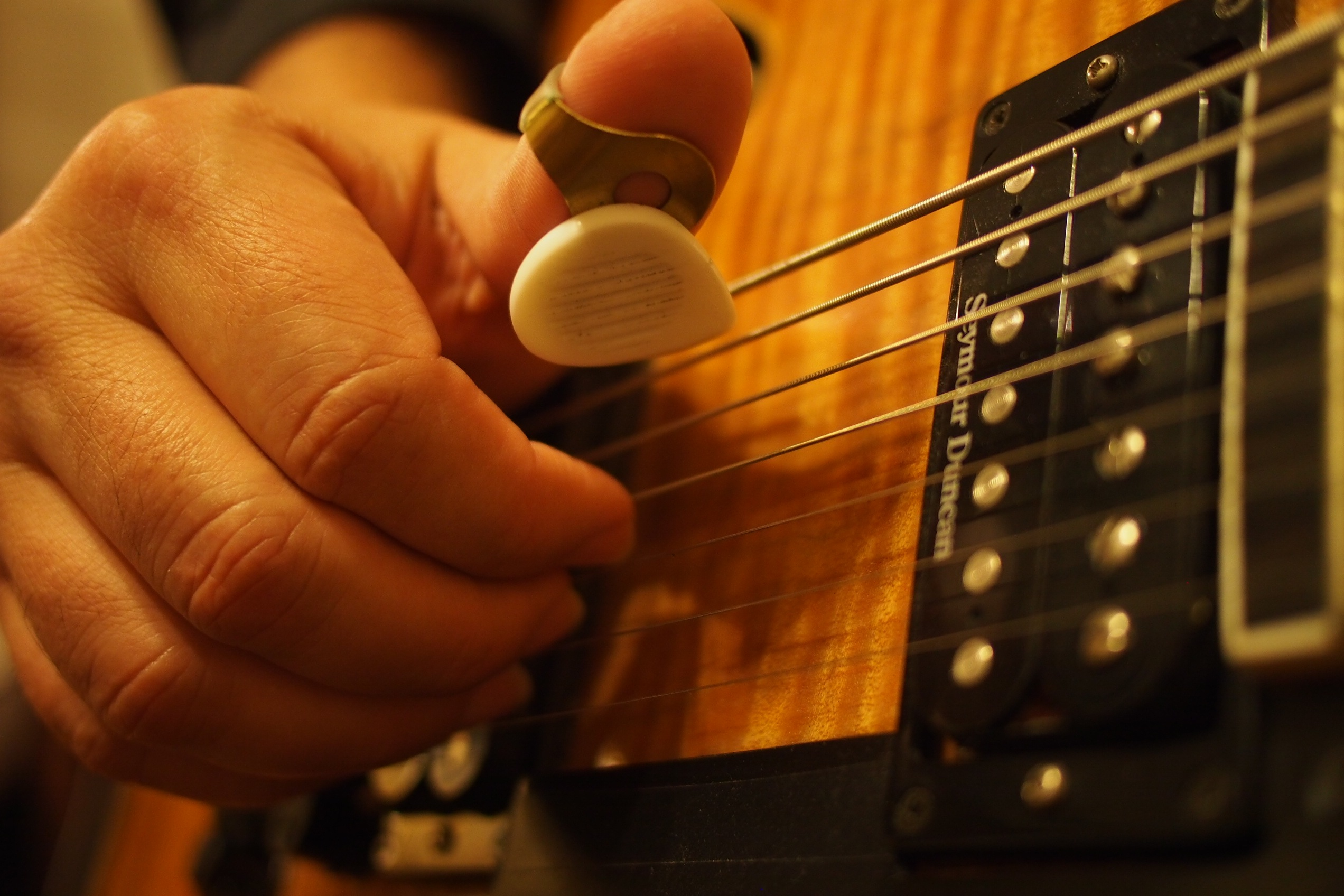
Masakowski's switch pick

In 1978, Masakowski invented the key-tar, a guitar-like instrument with seven rows of keys instead of strings, one key at each fret. This pre-MIDI controller was hardwired to a Moog synthesizer. One advantage of such an instrument was that it allowed playing more than one note in a row of keys at the same time, the equivalent on the guitar of playing multiple simultaneous notes on one string. Masakowski's song "Stepping Stone" was composed on the keytar, which allowed for the cluster-type chord voicings. For the duration of the Mars era, his rig included a Gretsch seven-string guitar with the keytar fastened to the top. He chose not to pursue a patent for the keytar, opting to concentrate on a revised prototype of the instrument that failed due to lack of funding.

In 1987, Masakowski invented the switch pick to help when switching from fingers to plectrum. "I invented something I call a switch-pick, which is a sort of thumb pick...[made] in such a way that if I slide it up my finger, the support part doesn't come in contact with my thumb, so it feels like a normal pick. And then if I want to use it as a thumb pick, I just slide it up my finger, and I can play finger style with the thumb pick using all five fingers."

He told an interviewer, "The pick is more efficient and has a better sound on fast lines where I need swing drive, but certain ideas, like fast diatonic-fourth runs, are easier to play fingerstyle."

Inspired by a visit to New Orleans by seven-string guitarist Bucky Pizzarelli, Masakowski began to explore the seven-string guitar, first finding an early Gretsch, then designing his own models which have the expanded range of a normal guitar and bass guitar combined. His custom designs were built by luthiers Jimmy Foster and Salvador Giardina.

=== Personal life ===
In 1982, Masakowski married German pianist Ulrike Antonie Sprenger. The couple have two children, both professional musicians: vocalist Sasha Masakowski (b. 1986) and double bassist Martin (b. 1990). Since 2007, the Masakowski family has been playing in bands together, including the group Nova NOLA.

In 2017 the Masakowski Family released the album N.O. Escape, a combination of jazz, gypsy jazz, and vocal jazz. Steve Masakowski co-wrote three songs based on the novel A Confederacy of Dunces.

== Awards and honors ==
- 10 best guitarists list, Wavelength magazine (1991)
- Big Easy Award, Astral Project (1993, 1994, 2000)
- Best Guitarist (1994–1998, 2002) OffBeat magazine
- Best Contemporary Jazz Group (1994–2002), Astral Project, OffBeat magazine
- Keeping the Music Alive Award, Danny Barker Estate (2003)
- Global Excellence Award, Summers Multicultural Institute (2005)
- Germaine Bazzle Award for Music Education and Performance (2014)

== Discography ==
=== As leader ===
Date	Album title	Personnel	Label
1983	Mars	Dave Liebman, Kent Jordan, Patrice Fisher, David Torkanowsky, Larry Sieberth, James Black, Ricky Sebastian, Mark Sanders	Prescription
1991	Friends	Rick Margitza, Michael Pellera, Ellis Marsalis Jr., Bill Huntington, Herlin Riley	Nebula
1994	What It Was	Rick Margitza, Michael Pellera, Larry Sieberth, Bill Huntington, David Torkanowsky, James Genus, Ricky Sebastian, Don Alias, Hector Gallardo	Blue Note
1995	Direct AXEcess	James Singleton, Brian Blade	Blue Note
1998	Live at Snug Harbor	Earl Turbinton, Jason Marsalis, Bill Huntington, Johnny Vidacovich	Marzian
2000	(For Joe)	Bill Huntington, Johnny Vidacovich	Compass
2002	Los Tres Amigos, Moon and Sand	James Singleton, Hector Gallardo	Mirliton
2009	Nova NOLA, Wetland	Sasha Masakowski, Martin Masakowski, Ulrike Masakowski, James Westfall, Ricky Sebastian, Hector Gallardo, Scott Myers, Nick Solnick	privately published
2013	Things I Like	Rex Gregory, Peter Harris, Julian Garcia	self-release
2017	N.O. Escape	Steve Masakowski, Sasha Masakowski, Martin Masakowski, Paul Thibodeaux	self-release
2020	Have Yourself A Merry Little Christmas	Steve Masakowski, Sasha Masakowski, Martin Masakowski, Jamison Ross, Shea Pierre, Jason Marsalis	self-release

=== With Astral Project ===
Date	Album title	Label
1988	Dreams of Love with Tony Dagradi	Rounder
1994	Acoustic Fusion	Dorn
1995	Astral Project New Orleans LA	Astral Project
1997	Elevado	Compass
1999	Voodoobop	Compass
2002	Big Shot	Astral Project
2004	The Legend of Cowboy Bill	Astral Project
2006	Astral Project Live in New Orleans	Astral Project
2008	Blue Streak	Astral Project

=== As sideman ===
Date	Artist	Album title	Label
1987	Christopher Mason	Sakura	GSR
1987	Damon Short	Penguin Shuffle	Blue Room
1987	Alvin 'Red' Tyler	Graciously	Rounder
1988	Ramsey McLean & the Survivors	The New New Orleans Music: Jump Jazz	Rounder
1989	Rick Margitza	Color	Blue Note
1989	David Torkanowsky	Steppin' Out	Rounder
1990	Mose Allison	My Backyard	Blue Note
1990	I migliori	Live at Gino's	Chromatose
1991	Rick Margitza	Hope	Blue Note
1992	Phillip Manuel	A Time for Love	All for One
1992	Harry Sheppard	Points of View	Justice
1992	Harry Sheppard	This-a-Way That-a-Way	
1994	Tony Dagradi Trio	Live at the Columns	Turnipseed
1995	Johnny Adams	The Verdict	Rounder
1995	Denise Mangiardi	Fine Tuning	Crow Hill
1995	Betty Shirley	Unveiled	Summit
1995	Johnny Vidacovich	Mystery Street	Record Chebasco
1996	Denise Mangiardi	A River of My Own	Crow Hill
1997	Michael Pellera	Cloud 9	Pajacis
1999	Leigh Harris	House of Secrets	Deeva
1999	Phillip Manuel	Swingin' in the Holidays	Glad-Man
2000	Phillip Manuel	Loved Happened to Me	Maxjazz
2001	Albert–Ankrum Project	Albert-Ankrum Project	Lakefront
2001	Olivier Bou	Boo-Shah-o-Ray	Olga
2001	Kevin Clark and the Crescent City Moonlighters	Big Band Music	KC
2002	Samirah Evans	Give Me a Moment	Misha
2003	Ricky Sebastian	The Spirit Within	STR
2004	Harold Battiste	Lagniappe: The 2nd 50 Years: The Future of our Past	AFO
2004	James Black	(I Need) Altitude	Night Train
2004	Phil deGruy	Just Duet	Heard Instinct
2004	Dr. John	N'Awlinz: Dis Dat or D'Udda	Blue Note
2005	Dorothy Doring	Southern Exposure	Quarter Note
2005	John Ellis	One Foot in the Swamp	privately printed
2006	Colleen Porter	Faith in New Orleans	Independent
2006	Colleen Porter	I Love My City New Orleans	Independent
2007?	Mary Jane Ewing	I Love Bein' Here with You	privately published
2008	Samirah Evans	My Little Bodhisattva	Misha
2008	Sasha Masakowski	Musical Playground	self-produced
2008	TriFunctA	Hangin'	self-produced
2009	Kaya Martinez	Emergence	Polyamorous
2011	Sasha Masakowski and Musical Playground	Wishes	Hypersoul
2012	Stephanie Jordan Big Band	Stephanie Jordan Sings a Tribute to the Fabulous Lena Horne	Vige
2013	Clarence Johnson III	Watch Him Work	Like Father Like Son
2014	Charlie Dennard	From Brazil to New Orleans	self-published
2015	Mary Jane Guiney	Stay True	Moxiemuzic
2015	Irvin Mayfield	New Orleans Jazz Playhouse	Basin Street
