= Andrew Kaslow =

Andrew J. Kaslow
- Birth name: Andrew Jonathan Kaslow
- Born: March 5, 1950 (age 75); New York City, New York, United States
- Occupation(s): Saxophonist, record producer, band leader, author, anthropologist, media executive
- Instrument(s): Saxophone, flute, clarinet, keyboards
- Years active: 1970-present
- Labels: Alligator Records

Andrew Jonathan Kaslow (born March 5, 1950, New York, New York, United States) is an American author, record producer, saxophonist and entertainment executive.

== Biography ==
Andrew Kaslow attended Columbia University where he earned a B.A., a master's degree (M.A.) in Music and Music Education, and a Doctorate in Anthropology Ph.D.), with a specialization in ethnomusicology, African-American culture, and urban social networks. He also attended the Institut d'Etudes Politiques in Paris. Kaslow studied piano and clarinet in his early years, and later studied saxophone with musicians Jimmy Heath, Eddie Barefield, Lee Konitz, and Eddie Daniels. He also studied flute with the New York Philharmonic virtuoso, John Wummer. Between 1973 and 1976 Kaslow played in various ska, calypso and salsa bands throughout New York City. In mid-1974, under the auspices of the Columbia University School of International Affairs' Latin American Institute, he conducted fieldwork in Jamaica, researching the roots of reggae, and authored an ethnography about the social networks of the Jamaican musical community, later publishing a seminal article in Sing Out! magazine on the subject. After moving to New Orleans in 1977 with his wife at the time Allison Miner, Kaslow began playing saxophone for and working as band leader and arranger to the New Orleans pianist Professor Longhair. Kaslow is credited with co-producing and playing on the seminal album of Longhair's career, Crawfish Fiesta, which also featured Dr. John on guitar, and which was awarded the W.C. Handy Contemporary Blues Album of the Year in 1980. Kaslow also toured as a backing musician for Clarence "Gatemouth" Brown until 1981. He was also on the faculty of the University of New Orleans Department of Anthropology and Geography as an assistant professor of anthropology, and was a researcher and writer for the US Department of the Interior, National Park Service's Jean Lafitte National Historical Park.

As an entertainment and media executive Dr. Kaslow served as Senior Executive Vice President of Human Resources for Vivendi Universal from January 2002 until 2004 and as Senior Vice President of Human Resources at Time Warner from January 1999 to 2001 where he was responsible for leading all facets of human resources across Time Warner. In 2013, Kaslow was appointed to the board of the NY Pops. Previously, he served on the boards of jazz radio station WBGO-FM in Newark, New Jersey, and the public broadcasting TV and Radio Network, NJN.

In 1991, along with fellow anthropologist Claude Jacobs, Kaslow authored The Spiritual Churches of New Orleans: Origins, Beliefs, and Rituals of an African-American Religion published by The University of Tennessee Press. In the book Jacobs and Kaslow provide historical background on the formative years of the spiritual churches of New Orleans, using newspaper articles from the African-American Louisiana Weekly, as well as interviews with early church leaders conducted by fieldworkers from the Louisiana Writers' Project under the auspices of the Works Progress Administration. The authors also reported on the many church events they attended as participant-observers. In addition to regular worship services, they described baptisms, Holy communion, ordination of ministers and consecration of bishops, and feasts in honor of various saints, the Old Testament Queen Esther, and Black Hawk. There is also a detailed examination of spirit possession, prophecy, and healing as it occurs in church services.

== Discography ==
=== Producer/musician ===
- 1980: Crawfish Fiesta Professor Longhair (Alligator Records)

=== Tenor saxophone ===
- 1982: The Last Mardi Gras Professor Longhair (Atlantic Records)
- 1993: The Professor Longhair Anthology Professor Longhair (Rhino Records)
