= James Singleton (musician) =

American jazz bassist, composer, and producer

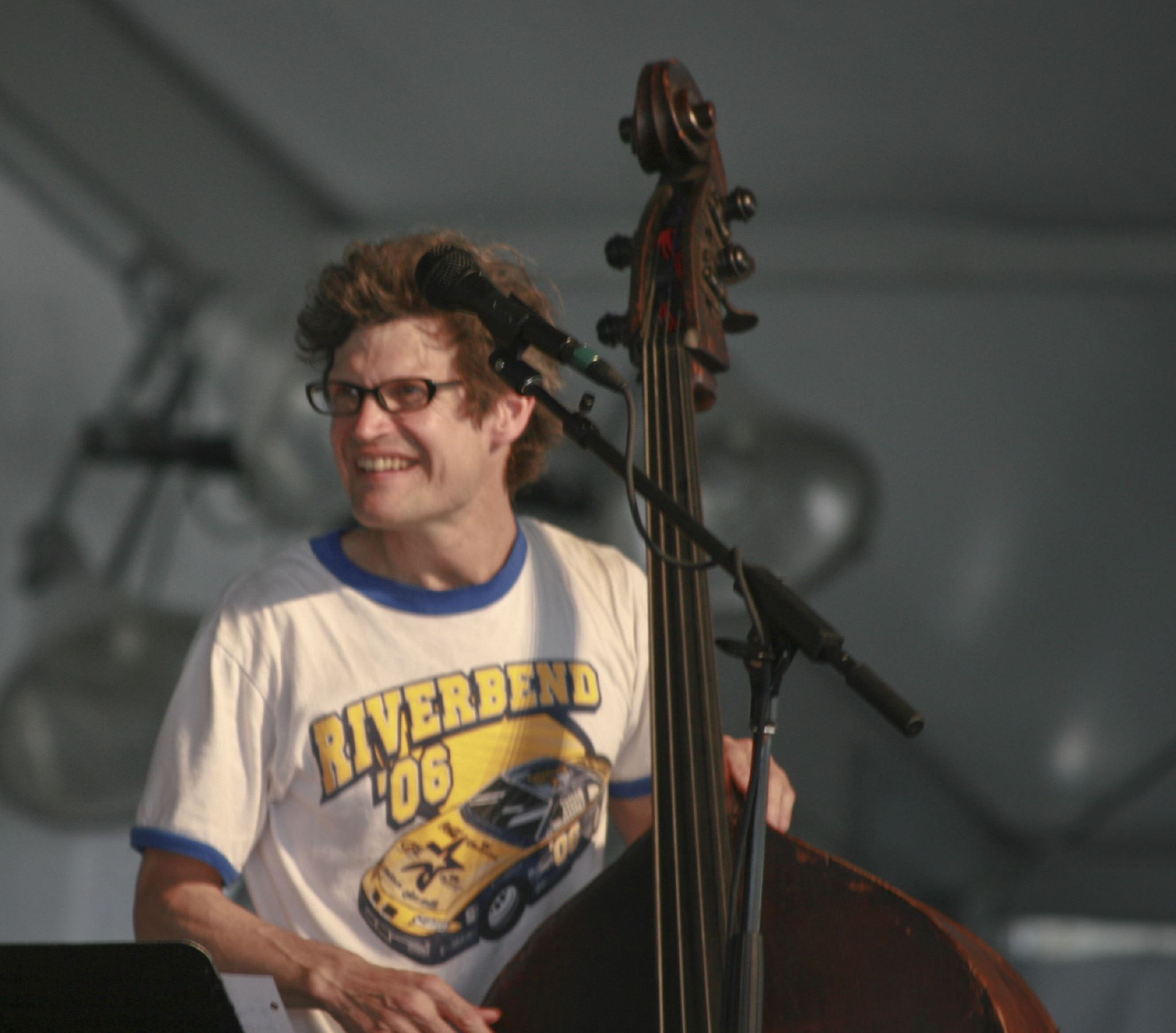
- James Singleton at Jazz Fest, performing as Woodshed (with Roland Guerin and Tim Green) on May 4, 2007

Background information
- Born: James Evan Singleton; October 8, 1955 (age 70)
- Genres: Jazz
- Occupation: Musician
- Instrument: Double bass

James Singleton is an American acoustic bassist, composer, and producer. He is a member of the New Orleans–based jazz group Astral Project with Johnny Vidacovich, Tony Dagradi, and Steve Masakowski. He has been described as one of the best and most sought-after bassists in New Orleans.

== Career ==
Singleton has performed with John Scofield, Stanton Moore, and John Medeski as well as John Abercrombie, Art Baron, Ellis Marsalis, Earl Turbinton, Eddie Harris, Clarence "Gatemouth" Brown, Lionel Hampton, Arnett Cobb and Banu Gibson among others. He has recorded with Chet Baker, Alvin "Red" Tyler, James Booker, Johnny "Tan Canary" Adams, Charlie Rich and Zachary Richard among others.

He produced Astral Project's Elvado which won OffBeat magazine's 1998 Best Modern Jazz Album of the year award. Although Elvado has been described as "straight-ahead bop-influenced jazz with a Crescent City ambiance" Astral Project's live performances are also known for improvisation which Singleton has described as "composing in the groove."

He has led projects such as "3 Now 4," "The James Singleton Orchestra" and "The James Singleton Trio."

Some of Singleton's recent projects include playing as a member of the New Orleans saxophonist Robert Wagner Trio and the New Orleans keyboardist Robert Walter Trio. In early 2007 he toured nationally with Skerik and Mike Dillon. In 2008 various projects included an experimental jazz string quartet composed of two former Louisiana Philharmonic Orchestra members Dave Rebeck and Matt Rhody as well as cellist Helen Gillet. Singleton moved to Los Angeles after Hurricane Katrina, but continued to perform frequently in New Orleans. In December 2008, Singleton returned to New Orleans.

== Selected discography ==
- Malabar, James Singleton (2022)
- Whole Lotta Orange, Outer Park (2021)
- 1968 (slight return), Outer Park (2019)
- No Revenge Necessary, Nolatet (2018)
- Dogs, Nolatet (2016)
- Bones, Dillon, Vidacovich, Singleton (2013)
- Gold Bug Crawl, James Singleton String Quartet (2008)
- Cure All, Robert Walter (2008)
- Lost Children, Rob Wagner Trio (2006)
- Super Heavy Organ, Robert Walter (2005)
- Time Ebbing, 3now4 (with Dave Easley) (2004)
- Legend of Cowboy Bill, Astral Project (2004)
- Book of Spells, 3now4 (with Dave Easley) (2002)
- 3now4, 3now4 (with Dave Easley) (1997)
- A Moment of Peace, Olivier Bou (1995)
- Direct Axecess, Steve Masakowski (1993)
- What It Was, Steve Masakowski (1993)
