= Astral Project =

American modern jazz quartet

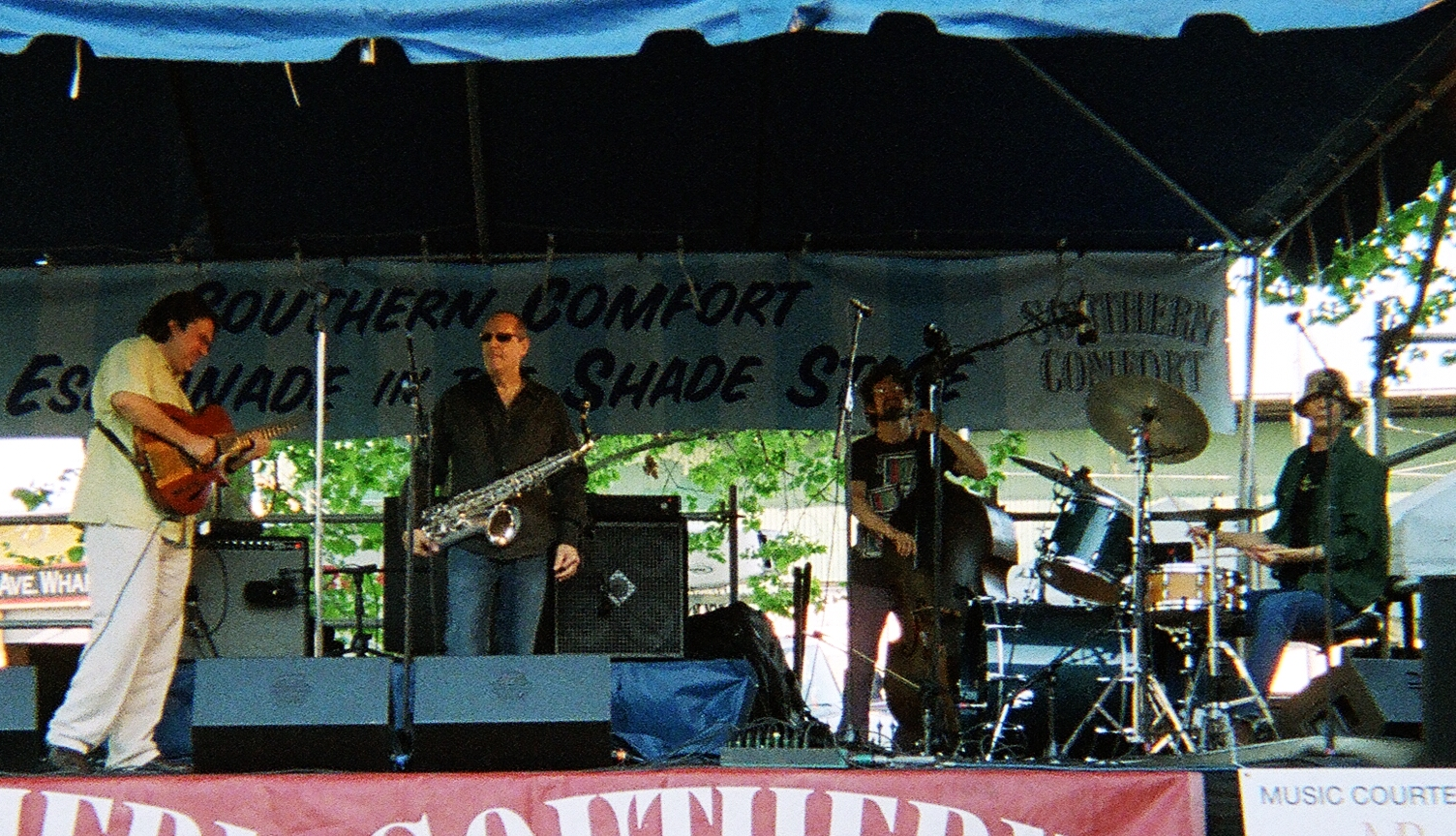
- Astral Project performing in 2010

Background information
- Origin: New Orleans, Louisiana
- Genres: Jazz
- Years active: 1978–present
- Label: Compass
- Members: Tony Dagradi; Johnny Vidacovich; James Singleton; Steve Masakowski
- Past members: David Torkanowsky
- Website: www.astralproject.com

Astral Project is a modern jazz quartet from New Orleans, Louisiana. It was founded by saxophonist Tony Dagradi in 1978 and includes drummer Johnny Vidacovich, bassist James Singleton and 7-string guitarist Steve Masakowski. The band originally included pianist David Torkanowsky who left in 2001. Astral Project blends jazz, funk music, rock, and world music and has been called one of New Orleans' premier jazz groups.

Astral Project began performing at the Absinthe House on Bourbon Street where during their early years Bobby McFerrin was known to often sit in. Having made several national and international tours, the quartet has continued to perform more recently at Snug Harbor and at New Orleans Jazz & Heritage Festival in New Orleans. Astral Project has received several Big Easy Entertainment Awards.

== Discography ==
- Come With Me (Astral Project)
- Astral Project (Astral Project, 1997)
- Elevado (Compass, 1998)
- Voodoo Bop (Compass, 1999)
- Big Shot (Astral Project, 2003)
- The Legend of Cowboy Bill (Astral Project, 2004)
- Live in New Orleans (Astral Project, 2006)
- Blue Streak (Astral Project, 2008)
