= Allison Miner =

American music manager (1949–1995)

- Also known as: Allison Kaslow
- Born: Elizabeth Allison Crowther; September 23, 1949; Baltimore, Maryland, U.S.
- Died: December 23, 1995 (aged 46) New Orleans, Louisiana, U.S.
- Occupations: Festival producer, music producer, manager
- Years active: 1970–1995

Elizabeth Allison Miner (née Crowther) (September 23, 1949 – December 23, 1995) was an American music promoter and manager. She was instrumental in the early production and was a co-founder with George Wein and Quint Davis of the New Orleans Jazz & Heritage Festival and the later career of pianist Professor Longhair.

== Early life ==
Allison Miner was born Elizabeth Allison Crowther in Baltimore, Maryland and grew up in Daytona Beach, Florida where she attended Seabreeze High School. During high school, she performed as a vocalist with her friend and classmate Duane Allman and his brother Gregg's fledgling band at local venues under the billing A. Miner & The Allman Joys. The brothers would go on to become The Allman Brothers Band.

== Career ==
=== New Orleans Jazz & Heritage Festival ===
After moving to New Orleans in 1968, Miner began a career as a music manager, archivist and festival promoter. When George Wein, the founder of the Newport Jazz Festival and Newport Folk Festival, asked the Tulane University Jazz archive's then-director Richard (Dick) Allen to recommend people who could help him launch a New Orleans music festival in Congo Square, he suggested his employee Miner. Later, Miner and Quint Davis began rounding up interested musicians. The first festival had so few attendees that the staff ended up giving tickets away at a nearby school. The festival grew into the New Orleans Jazz & Heritage Festival.

Miner helped run the festival for its first five years. She is primarily credited with the co-founding of both the New Orleans Jazz & Heritage Foundation and primary founder of the New Orleans Jazz & Heritage Foundation Archives. The Archive contains recordings from musicians interviewed at the festival and other culturally relevant documents, photographs, and ephemera related to the festival and the foundation's holdings, including samples of on-air recordings of WWOZ 90.7-FM. When the New Orleans Jazz and Heritage Festival could not hold an ‘in person’ event, the New Orleans Jazz & Heritage Foundation Archives provided many hours of prior recordings that the station was able to use in broadcast during the COVID19 pandemic shutdown in a financally successful “Festing In Place” campaign that was repeated multiple times by the station to raise funds. In 2019, The New Orleans Jazz & Heritage Foundation Archives were the key source material used for the Smithsonian Folkways recordings 50th anniversary box set of live festival recordings.

=== Music manager and producer ===
Miner went on to guide the career of Professor Longhair, aka Henry Roeland Byrd, from the mid-1970s until his death in 1980. During those years, he toured overseas, produced popular recordings and gained critical acclaim. Her husband at the time, Andrew Kaslow, led Professor Longhair's back-up band. "Her devotion to Professor Longhair gave him the best years of his life", George Wein was quoted as saying in Miner's obituary that ran in The Times-Picayune.

Miner and Kaslow moved to Cleveland in the mid-1980s, where she produced a Cajun and zydeco radio show at Case Western Reserve University on WRUW 91.1, led the National Folk Festival at the Cuyahoga Valley National Park and was development director at the Cleveland Music School Settlement.

In later years when Miner moved back to New Orleans, she managed and booked tours in the early career of the Rebirth Brass Band, whose founding members included trumpeter Kermit Ruffins.

=== Return to Jazz Fest and New Orleans ===
Miner returned to New Orleans in 1988, creating the Jazz Fest's Music Heritage Stage, which features interviews with performers. "...'This is my way of bringing the Jazz Fest back to the way it was in the old days, like sitting around the living room floor and getting to know these people,' she said in a 1990 interview. 'It was our way of having a more intimate involvement with the musicians.... We talk and they perform and answer questions from the audience. People say it's like the Oprah Winfrey part of the festival.' Miner, who also became the festival's first archivist, said that Jazz Fest 'is a reflection of what the world needs to know about New Orleans music.'...". The Music Heritage stage was later renamed as The Allison Miner Music Heritage Stage, in her honor.

== Death and legacy ==
In December 1995, Miner succumbed to complications from multiple myeloma, at age 46. Her memorial service and traditional New Orleans jazz funeral were held at City Park and attended by hundreds of people, including many notable musicians from the city such as Kermit Ruffins, the Rebirth Brass Band and the Zion Harmonizers.

Amy Nesbitt created a documentary about Miner based on interviews during the final two years of her life, Reverence: A Tribute To Allison Miner. The project won the New Orleans Film Festival award for Best Short 1996. The film was produced through the nonprofit Video Veracity, which has facilitated dozens of other New Orleans-focused documentaries and independent films. Many interviews of crew members who built the festival and local luminaries as well as footage of Miner's memorial ceremony have been gifted by Nesbitt for educational purposes to the New Orleans Jazz and Heritage Festival Foundation Archive, which Miner created.

The Heritage Stage at the New Orleans Jazz and Heritage Festival grounds was renamed the Allison Miner Music Heritage Stage. After Hurricane Katrina, the stage was temporarily merged with the Lagniappe Stage which is housed in the grandstand, and in 2009 it was reinstated as a full stage.

Miner's 1997 book Jazz Fest Memories was published posthumously through Pelican Publishing Company. The book contains photographs by her longtime friend Michael P. Smith and descriptions and stories of the early days of the festival by Miner.

The New Orleans Jazz and Heritage Foundation eventually established The Allison Miner Series as an initiative of the New Orleans Jazz & Heritage Foundation Archive to highlight research, scholarship, and projects that utilize the historic collection. Miner was a dedicated advocate for New Orleans music and culture, known for her significant contributions to the preservation and promotion of the city’s musical heritage. Her passion and commitment to supporting local musicians and cultural traditions have left a lasting impact on the community. The Allison Miner Lecture Series was created to underscore the work of recipients of the Jazz & Heritage Fellowship Research Grants.

== Personal life ==
Miner is the first cousin five times removed to Sir Moses Montefiore on her father's side. Her uncle Frank Crowther was a speechwriter for Robert F. Kennedy in the 1960s and close personal friend to Norman Mailer. Her paternal grandfather Rodney Crowther was the chief war correspondent in Europe during World War II for The Baltimore Sun. She is survived by her two sons, Jonathan Kaslow and Rashi Montefiore Kaslow. Her niece is American writer and essayist Amina Cain.
