= Chris Stillwell =

Chris Stillwell (born June 4, 1966, Seattle, Washington, United States) is the American bassist for the band The Greyboy Allstars.

He was born to David and Cheryle Stillwell. The family moved to San Diego when Chris was about six months old. He stole his first guitar from his older sister's closet. He acquired an old telephone transcriber which he was able to slow the pitch down to his favorite guitarists' solos: Jimmy Page, Jeff Beck, and Django Reinhardt. Soon he was playing in neighborhood bands on bass, doing Yardbirds, Jeff Beck, Zeppelin tunes.

== Sources ==
- Official website
