= Tony Dagradi =

American jazz saxophonist (born 1952)

Anthony Arnold "Tony" Dagradi (born September 22, 1952) is an American jazz saxophonist.

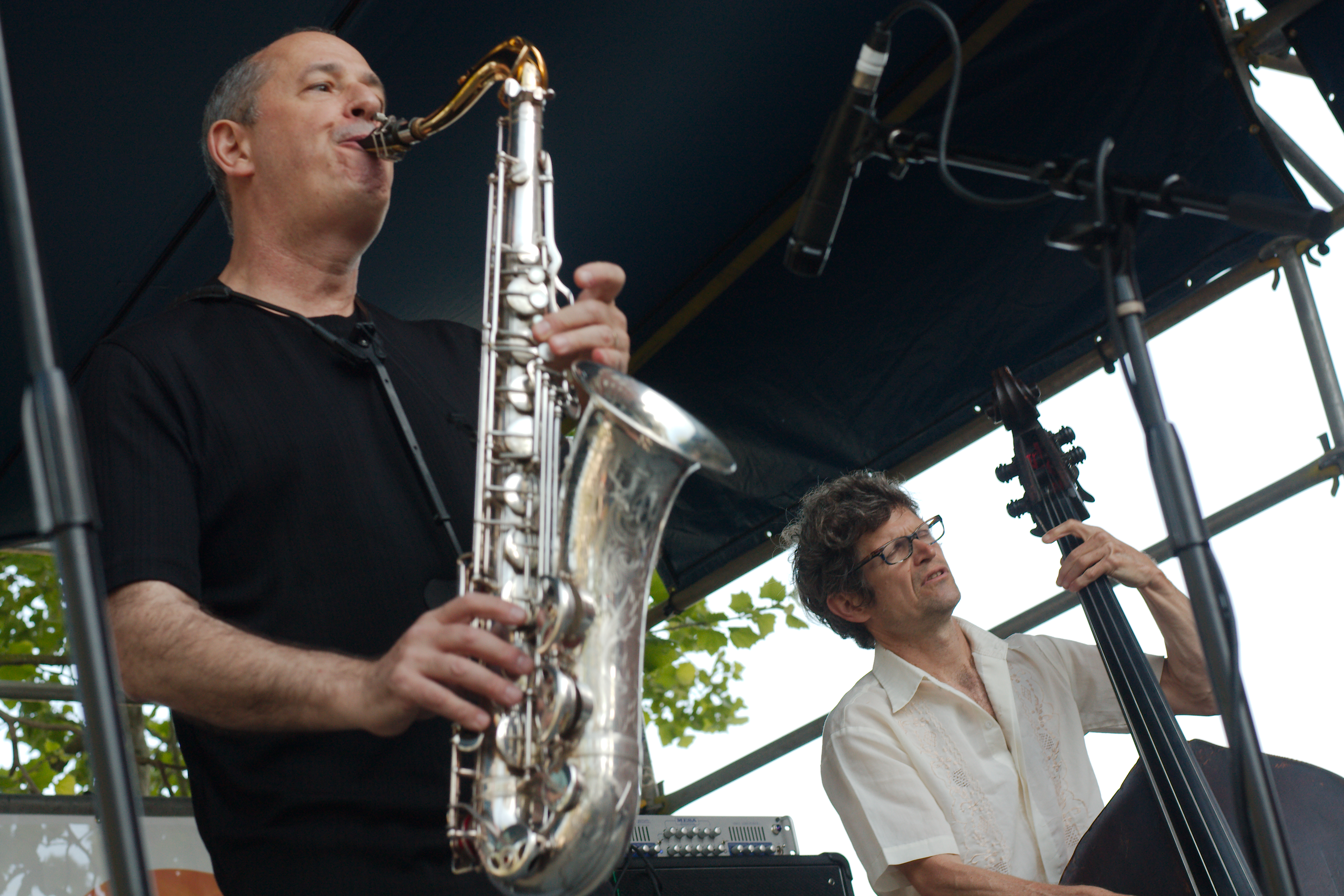
Dagradi playing with Astral Project at French Quarter Festival 2013; James Singleton in the background.

== Biography ==
Dagradi was born in New York City, and began playing alto saxophone when he was eight years old. In his professional career, he has primarily played tenor and soprano saxophone. He studied under Pepper Adams, Andy McGhee, Kidd Jordan, and Tony Aless in his youth, and was a student at Berklee College of Music (1970-1972). The following year he founded the ensemble Inner Visions, which included Ed Schuller and Gary Valente as sidemen. After touring with Archie Bell and the Drells, he relocated to New Orleans in 1977 and freelanced regularly with jazz and blues musicians in the city. He was a member of Professor Longhair's touring band in the final years of Longhair's life, touring the United States and Europe and recording with him on the album Crawfish Fiesta. In 1978 he cofounded Astral Project, a group which has been active on the New Orleans jazz scene for over forty years. In the 1980s he worked with Ramsey McLean, Carla Bley, and Bobby McFerrin. He earned a bachelor's degree at Loyola in 1986 and a master's degree at Tulane in 1990. In the 1990s he worked with, among others, Mose Allison and Ellis Marsalis, and is now professor of music at Loyola.
