= James Booker =

American R&B keyboardist and singer (1939–1983)

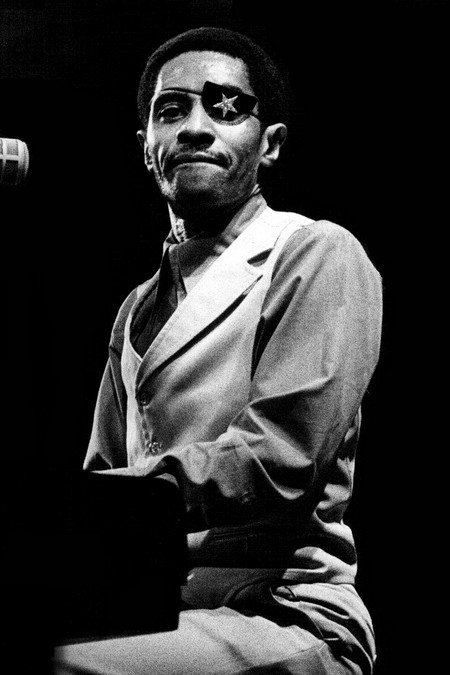
- Booker in 1978

Background information
- Also known as: Little Booker, The Black Liberace, The Bayou Maharajah
- Born: James Carroll Booker III; December 17, 1939; New Orleans, Louisiana, U.S.
- Died: November 8, 1983 (aged 43) New Orleans, Louisiana, U.S.
- Genres: Rhythm and blues, jazz
- Occupation: Musician
- Instruments: Keyboards, vocals
- Years active: 1954–1983

James Carroll Booker III (December 17, 1939 – November 8, 1983) was an American New Orleans rhythm and blues keyboardist and singer. Flamboyant in personality and style, and a pianist of extraordinary technical skill, he was dubbed "the Black Liberace."

His 1960 recording "Gonzo" reached No. 43 on the Billboard magazine record chart and No. 3 in R&B, and he toured internationally in the 1970s. After being mainly a rhythm and blues artist, Booker later fused this genre with jazz and with popular music such as that of the Beatles, playing these in his signature backbeat. He profoundly influenced the New Orleans music scene, where his renditions and originals have been revived and are performed.

== Biography ==
=== Early life ===
Booker's father and paternal grandfather were Baptist ministers. Both were pianists. He was born in New Orleans on December 17, 1939, to Ora, née Cheatham and Rev. James "Jimmie" Harald Booker, a New Orleans Baptist church pastor and World War I army veteran. Nicknamed J.C., Booker was a child prodigy, classically trained on piano from the age of six, and played the organ in his father's churches. Due to Rev. Jimmie Booker's health problems, Ora took her daughter Betty Jean (b. 1935) and son James to live near Ora's sister, Eva Sylvester, in Bay St. Louis, Mississippi, temporarily on several occasions. Those stays amounted to around half of Booker's childhood up to the age of 8. He returned permanently to New Orleans in 1948, and enrolled in the fourth grade at a school where he befriended fellow students Art Neville, Charles Neville, and Allen Toussaint. By 1949, Booker's parents had separated, and Ora remarried to Owen Champagne of New Orleans.

In 1949 at age 9, Booker was struck by an ambulance in New Orleans, that he said was traveling about 70 miles an hour. According to him, it dragged him for 30 feet (9 metres) and broke his leg in eight places, nearly requiring its amputation. He was given morphine, which he later regarded as a cause of his eventual drug addiction. The accident left him with a permanent limp.

Booker received a saxophone for his 10th birthday in December 1949. He had asked for a trumpet, yet mastered the saxophone despite not having chosen it. But he focused on the piano, and by age 11 was performing blues and gospel organ every Sunday on the New Orleans radio station, WMRY (where his sister had performed). The following year was his last in classical instruction, when Booker learned the entire set of J.S. Bach's Inventions and Sinfonias, performing these at a professional level by age 12.

Rev. Jimmie Booker died in 1953, the year that Booker began high school at Xavier University Preparatory School on Magazine Street. Ellis Marsalis Jr. was band director at the school at the time, and noted the highly advanced quality of Booker's playing of Bach. Even as a working musician by his mid teens, he excelled at Xavier, especially in math, music, and Spanish, and graduated in 1957. He aspired to become a Catholic priest, yet gave up the idea, deciding to express his faith through music.

=== Booker Groove ===
As a classical pianist, Booker focused on music of Chopin, Rachmaninoff, and Ernesto Lecuona (for example, Malagueña), and memorized solos by Erroll Garner and Liberace. He learned some elements of his keyboard style from Tuts Washington and Edward Frank, and was influenced by Professor Longhair and Ray Charles. But another major influence, one who helped inspire Booker's unique style, was Fats Domino. Booker developed a backbeat rhythm that resembles some of Domino's piano playing. Domino and his drummer, Earl Palmer, are considered among the inventors of the early rock and roll backbeat. Booker's version of this rhythm has been called the "Booker groove". Joshua Paxton, however, a New Orleans–based pianist and transcriber of Booker's solos, credits the groove to Booker, not mentioning Domino. Whatever its origin, Booker used this to substitute the original rhythm on a wide variety of popular and folk music. Many examples were New Orleans rhythm and blues, as "Junco Partner", Fats Domino's "All By Myself" and "I'm in Love Again", Lloyd Price's "Lawdy Miss Clawdy", Earl King's "Let's Make a Better World," and it is the composed rhythm on some of Booker's own pieces, including "Pop's Dilemma." A few were jazz standards, "Tico-Tico" and "On the Sunny Side of the Street", but also pop rock, as in The Beatles' Eleanor Rigby, and country, Roger Miller's "King of the Road".

=== 1954 to 1976: Recording and touring ===
Booker made his recording debut in 1954 at the age of 14, on Imperial Records, with "Doin' the Hambone" and "Thinkin' 'Bout My Baby", produced by Dave Bartholomew. While these were unsuccessful commercially, Bartholomew subsequently had Booker ghost on piano for Fats Domino, to combine his virtuosity with Domino's popular singing. This collaboration would be repeated in the late 1960s. During the late 1950s, Booker adopted a flamboyant stage dress. In this way he emulated Little Richard as did Esquerita, both of whom recorded in New Orleans. In 1958, Arthur Rubinstein performed a concert in New Orleans. Afterwards, eighteen-year-old Booker was introduced to the concert pianist and played several pieces for him. Rubinstein was astonished, saying "I could never play that ... never at that tempo" (The Times-Picayune, 1958).

From the mid 1950s into the 1960s, Booker played with a series of blues and rhythm and blues bands as partly described in liner notes (by Bunny Matthews) to the album Classified. In interview, he said he "recorded for Leonard Chess — I did 'A Heavenly Angel' with Arthur Booker [no relation]. After that, I recorded for Johnny Vincent's Ace Records. I played with Huey Smith and Shirley and Lee. When I graduated high school, I played with Joe Tex. I left Joe Tex to play with Huey Smith." Smith preferred not to be on the road, hence Booker replaced him when touring, and is even said to have impersonated Smith. Booker went on to record on piano with Larry Davis and his blues band in 1958, 1959, and 1960 in Houston, Texas. In January 1960 in Chicago, he recorded on piano with Junior Parker. He recorded on piano with Dave Bartholomew's studio band and Earl King, when King recorded for Imperial records in New Orleans in 1960 and 1961. Booker recorded as pianist with Smiley Lewis in 1960 and 1961, on organ for Lloyd Price in 1963, and on piano for Shirley & Lee in 1962 and 1963. In March 1962, Booker recorded four titles on the organ with Dave Bartholomew's band in New Orleans, of which two were released.

In the early 1960s, Booker recorded a series of instrumental singles on organ for Peacock Records. These were "Cool Turkey" and "Gonzo" in 1960, "Smacksie" and "Kinda Happy" in 1960 and 1961, and "Tubby," "Cross my Heart" and "Big Nick," dates unknown between 1960 and 62. In 1960, he enrolled as an undergraduate in Southern University's music department, although he did not remain beyond the fall semester of that year. The professor of music at Southern complained of the pianist's classroom antics. He insisted Booker omit his examination, and that "I'll grade him anyway; he keeps on disrupting my classes with all kinds of craziness and stuff." During the week of December 5, 1960, however, "Gonzo" reached number 43 on the United States (U.S.) record chart of Billboard magazine. It also reached number 3 on the R&B record chart, and was a favorite song of the author Hunter Thompson. None of Booker's other Peacock organ tracks enjoyed such fame.

Booker continued to tour and performed at New Orleans nightclubs from 1960 until 1967. Yet he experienced a series of tragedies in the mid 1960s, all during a period of two years. In September 1966, his sister died, at a time when Booker was compelled to go on touring despite this event, compounding loss with a lack of opportunity to mourn. His mother died the following year, in June 1967. Within weeks of her death, he was arrested outside the Dew Drop Inn hotel and nightclub for possession of heroin, which he had begun using earlier in the sixties. Being convicted, Booker served a one-year sentence in Angola Prison, where he lost his left eye in an assault. After his release in 1968, he resumed session work in New Orleans, including recording with Fats Domino. In July 1968, he recorded with Freddie King in New York City, tracks that were released in 1969 and 1970.

As Booker became more familiar with law enforcement in New Orleans due to his drug use, he formed a relationship with District Attorney Harry Connick Sr., who was occasionally Booker's legal counsel. Connick would discuss law with Booker during his visits to the Connick home and made an arrangement with the musician whereby a prison sentence would be nullified in exchange for piano lessons for Connick Sr.'s son, Harry Connick Jr.

In 1973, Booker recorded The Lost Paramount Tapes at Paramount Studios in Hollywood, California, U.S. with members of the Dr. John band, which included John Boudreaux on drums, Jessie Hill on percussion, Alvin Robinson on guitar and vocals, Richard "Didymus" Washington on percussion, David Lastie on sax, and David L. Johnson on bass guitar. The album was produced by former Dr. John band member David L. Johnson and by singer-songwriter Daniel Moore. The master tapes disappeared from the Paramount Recording Studios library, but a copy of the mixes that were made around the time of the recordings was discovered in 1992, which resulted in a CD release on DJM Records.

Booker then played organ in Dr. John's Bonnaroo Revue touring band in 1974, and also appeared as a sideman on albums by Ringo Starr, John Mayall, The Doobie Brothers, Labelle and Geoff Muldaur throughout this period.

Booker's performance at the 1975 New Orleans Jazz and Heritage Festival earned a recording contract for him with Island Records. His album with Island, Junco Partner, was produced by Joe Boyd, who had previously recorded Booker on sessions for Muldaur's records. In January 1976, Booker briefly joined the Jerry Garcia Band, playing two Palo Alto, California shows where Garcia was "backing up ... Booker on most numbers."

=== 1976 to 1978: Success in Europe ===
Several concerts from Booker's 1977 and 1978 European tours were professionally recorded, and some were also filmed for television broadcast. Multiple albums were released from these recordings on a number of record labels. The album New Orleans Piano Wizard: Live!, which was recorded at his performance at the "Boogie Woogie and Ragtime Piano Contest" in Zürich, Switzerland, won the Grand Prix du Disque. He also played at the Nice and Montreux Jazz Festivals in 1978 and recorded a session for the BBC during this time. A recording entitled Let's Make A Better World!—made in Leipzig during this period—became the last record to be produced in the former East Germany.

In a 2013 interview, filmmaker Lily Keber, who directed a documentary on Booker, provided her perspective on Booker's warm reception in European nations such as Germany and France:

Well, the racism wasn't there, the homophobia wasn't there—as much. Even the drug use was a little more tolerated. But really I think that Booker felt he was being taken seriously in Europe, and it made him think of himself differently and improved the quality of his music. He needed the energy of the audience to feed off.

Keber further explained that Europeans refer to jazz as "the art of the twentieth century" and suggests that the "classical tradition" that is present in the continent led to a greater understanding of Booker among audiences. Keber states that Booker was "concert-hall worthy" to European jazz lovers.

=== 1978 to 1983: Return to the U.S. ===
From 1978 to 1982, Booker was the house pianist at the Maple Leaf Bar in the Carrollton neighborhood of uptown New Orleans. Recordings during this time, made by John Parsons, were released as Spiders on the Keys and Resurrection of the Bayou Maharajah. Following his success in Europe, Booker was forced to adjust to a lower level of public recognition, as he performed in cafes and bars. Keber believes this shift was "devastating" to Booker, as he was aware of his own talent.

Booker's last commercial recording, made in 1982, was titled Classified and, according to producer Scott Billington, was completed in four hours. By this time, Booker's physical and mental condition had deteriorated. He was also subject to the social stigma that affected people who used illicit drugs and those with mental health issues during this era of American history.

At the end of October 1983, filmmaker Jim Gabour captured Booker's final concert performance for a series on the New Orleans music scene. The series, entitled Music City, was broadcast on Cox Cable and included footage from the Maple Leaf Bar in New Orleans and a six-and-a-half-minute improvisation called "Seagram's Jam."

=== Death ===
Booker died aged 43 on November 8, 1983, while seated in a wheelchair in the emergency room at New Orleans' Charity Hospital, waiting to receive medical attention. The cause of death, as cited in the Orleans Parish Coroner's Death Certificate, was renal failure related to chronic abuse of heroin and alcohol.

== Posthumous tributes ==
Booker's death was mourned by music lovers and numerous admirers have emerged in the time since. Harry Connick Jr., Henry Butler, and Dr. John, among others, recorded songs with titles and musical styles referencing Booker. Connick explained his mentor's piano-playing style in an interview: "Nothing was harder than that. It's insane. It's insanity." and called him "the greatest ever."

Dr. John described Booker as "the best black, gay, one-eyed junkie piano genius New Orleans has ever produced."

Transcriptions by Joshua Paxton (with Tom McDermott and Andy Fielding) of Booker's playing are available in The James Booker Collection and New Orleans Piano Legends, both published by the Hal Leonard Corporation. Paxton explained the significance of Booker in a 2013 interview:

From a musician's perspective or piano player's perspective, he matters because he figured out how to do things no one had ever done before, at least in a rhythm-and-blues context.... Basically he figured out ways to do a lot of stuff at the same time and make the piano sound like an entire band. It's Ray Charles on the level of Chopin. It's all the soul, all the groove, and all the technique in the universe packed into one unbelievable player ... I can now say with certainty that it's a pianistic experience unlike any other. He invented an entirely new way of playing blues and roots-based music on the piano, and it was mind-blowingly brilliant and beautiful.

The influential New Orleans musician, composer, and producer Allen Toussaint also praised Booker, applying the term "genius" to him:

There are some instances in his playing that are very unusual and highly complex, but the groove is never sacrificed. Within all the romping and stomping in his music, there were complexities in it that, if one tried to emulate it, what you heard and what excited you on the surface was supported by some extreme technical acrobatics finger-wise that made his music extraordinary as far as I'm concerned. And most of all, it always felt wonderful ... He was an extraordinary musician, both soul wise and groove wise ... He was just an amazing musician.

Booker's vocal ability is also a subject that has been covered since his death. New Orleans pianist Tom McDermott, who has also studied the work of Booker, stated that he is "so moved" by Booker's vocals, as "you could feel the desperation in a way that few singers could impart." McDermott believes that Booker's skillful combination of vocal virtuosity with a magnificent emotional power superseded the singing of Frank Sinatra.

Patchwork: A Tribute to James Booker is a 2003 release consisting of a compilation of his songs, performed by various pianists. Released in 2007, Manchester '77 consists of a live performance recorded in October 1977 at The Lake Side Hotel, Belle Vue, Manchester, UK, with the Norman Beaker Band in support for two songs. In late 2013, Rounder Records announced the forthcoming release of a double-CD deluxe version of Classified, Booker's final studio recordings.

Writing for PopMatters in 2014, George de Stefano said: "And then there's James Booker, whose stature in New Orleans musical history can be gauged by the various nicknames bestowed on the gifted, troubled, openly gay musician: the Bayou Maharajah (the title of a new documentary film about the pianist), the Piano Pope, the Ivory Emperor, the Piano Prince of New Orleans. Booker himself coined at least one of these monikers—the Bronze Liberace."

== Bayou Maharajah: The Tragic Genius of James Booker ==
A feature-length documentary about Booker titled Bayou Maharajah: The Tragic Genius of James Booker, directed by Lily Keber, premiered at the SXSW festival on March 14, 2013. Keber raised funds on the Kickstarter website to complete the film, as she needed to cover licensing costs to include all of the "concert footage, home movie, funky photo and unreleased audio" that she uncovered across the U.S. and Europe. Between December 2012 and January 2013, the Kickstarter campaign received US$18,323 from 271 backers—Keber's goal was US$15,000—who responded to the director's motivation: "After so many years of simmering in obscurity, it's time for James Booker to be introduced to the world!"

The film documents Booker's life, from his Baptist upbringing through to his solitary death at Charity Hospital. In addition to coverage of Booker's significant influence upon Connick and his collaborations with prominent artists, Keber also documents the musician's heroin use and the deterioration in his mental health. In its review of the documentary, All About Jazz refers to Booker as a "jazz genius". Worldwide distribution of the film was undertaken by Cadiz music on August 6, 2016. As of September 1, 2016, the film is available for streaming on Amazon.com and Netflix. The DVD was released on October 14, 2016, in Europe and North America.

Keber's film was shown in May 2013—in the "Golden Rock Documentary" category—at the Little Rock Film Festival that is held annually on the banks of the Arkansas River in Little Rock, Arkansas. The Oxford American magazine bestowed the 2013 Best Southern Film Award to Keber at the Little Rock festival and praised the film as "one of the most culturally important documentaries made in recent years". Keber explained her introduction to Booker in a subsequent Oxford American interview:

When I played Booker's album, the first thing that I noticed was what bizarre song titles it had—stuff like "Coquette" and "Piano Salad." I didn't know what "piano salad" meant. I had no idea what to make of the music either. I know how to listen to something like the Neville Brothers or Irma Thomas, but Booker's music I didn't even know how to listen to. It was like a different language.

In June and August 2013, the film was part of the program of the Melbourne International Film Festival (MIFF) and producer Nathaniel Kohn attended as a representative. Kohn participated in a brief interview and explained the importance of the research process:

Research was key to discovering Booker and his music. He died in 1983 and many of the people who knew him are either dead or reaching that certain age when memories start to fade. So we talked to a lot of people and those conversations led to boxes of old photographs and tapes, video and music libraries in the States and in Europe, and the vaults of television stations, record companies, and museums. Over three years of research went into this production.

Keber's documentary was also the opening night film at the Southern Screen Film Festival in Lafayette, Louisiana, on November 14, 2013. A question and answer (Q&A) session with Keber followed the screening.

== Discography ==
=== Singles ===
- 1954, "Doin' the Hambone"/"Thinkin' 'Bout My Baby", Imperial Records
- 1958, "Open the Door/Teenage Rock", Ace Records: 547 (as Little Booker)
- 1960, "Gonzo", Peacock Records: 5-1697, FR1061

=== Studio albums ===
- Lost Paramount Tapes (DJM, 1974)
- Junco Partner (Hannibal, 1976)
- Classified (Demon, 1982)

=== Live albums ===
- The Piano Prince Of New Orleans (Black Sun Music, 1976)
- Blues And Ragtime From New Orleans (Aves, 1976)
- James Booker Live! (Gold, 1978)
- New Orleans Piano Wizard: Live! (Rounder, 1981)
- Resurrection of the Bayou Maharajah (Rounder, 1993)
- Spiders on the Keys (Rounder, 1993)
- Live at Montreux (Montreux Sounds, 1997)
- United Our Thing Will Stand (Night Train International, 2000)
- A Taste Of Honey (Night Train International, 2006)
- Manchester '77 (Document, 2007)
- Live From Belle Vue (Suncoast Music, 2015)
- At Onkel Pö's Carnegie Hall Hamburg 1976 Vol. 1 (Jazz Line, 2019)
- True - Live at Tipitina's - 04/25/78 (Tipitina's Records, 2021)

=== Compilations ===
- King Of New Orleans Keyboard Vol. 1-2 (JSP, 1984–85)
- Mr. Mystery (Sundown, 1984)
- Let's Make A Better World (Amiga, 1991)
- The Lost Paramount Tapes (DJM, 1995)
- More Than All The 45s (Night Train International, 1996)
- New Orleans Keyboard King (Orbis, 1996)

(Albums listed are with James Booker as main artist. For a complete discography which includes Booker's other album credits, see "External Links".)

== See also ==
- 1970s in jazz
- Drug use in songs
- Genius
- Jazz piano
- Music of New Orleans
- Piano history and musical performance
