= Johnny Vidacovich =

American jazz percussionist (born 1949)

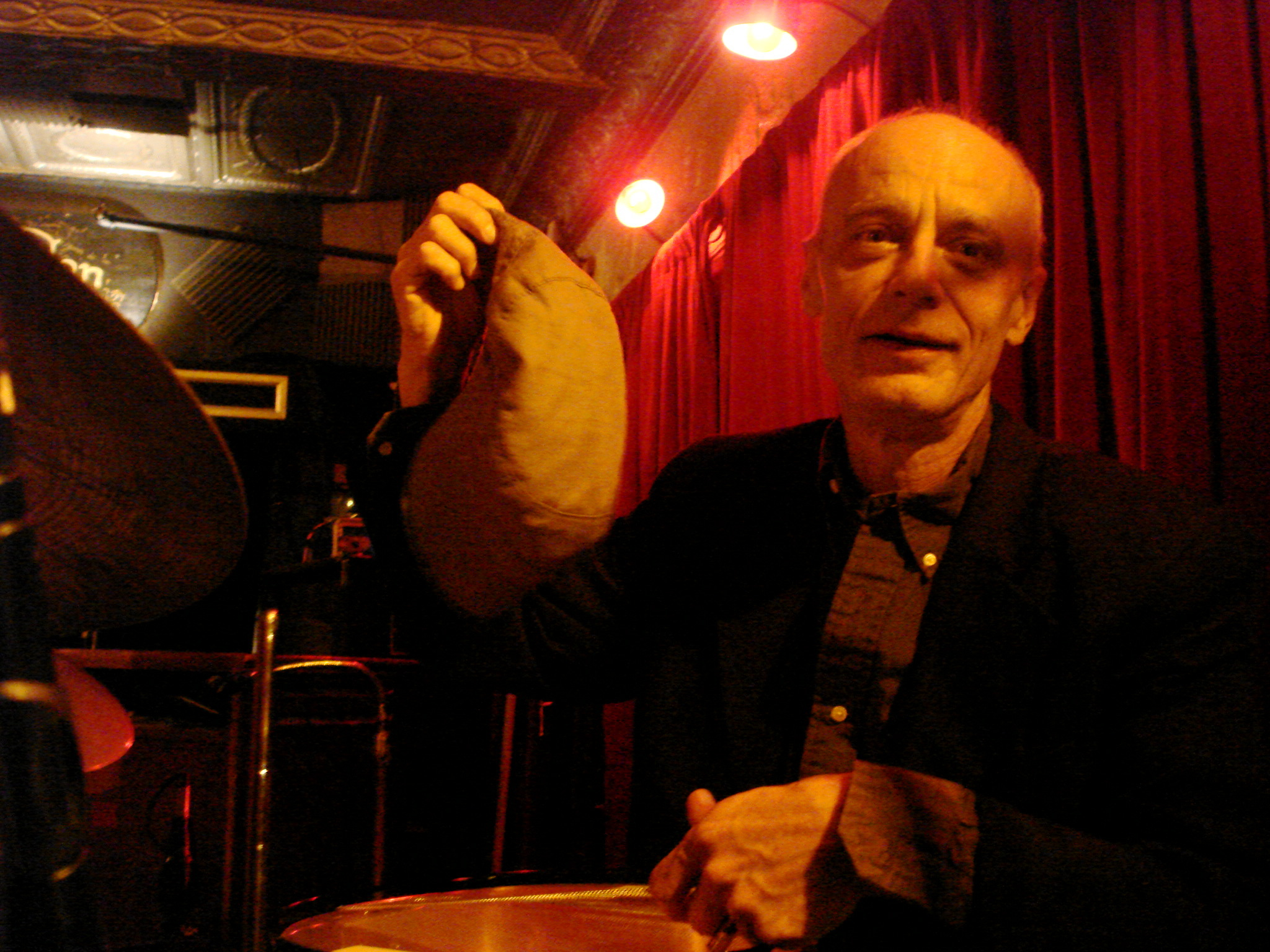
- Vidacovich in 2008

Background information
- Born: John Joseph Vidacovich Jr. June 27, 1949 (age 76); New Orleans, Louisiana, U.S.
- Genres: Jazz
- Occupation: Musician
- Instrument: Drums
- Member of: Astral Project

John Joseph Vidacovich Jr. (born June 27, 1949) is an American jazz drummer and a member of the band Astral Project with James Singleton, Tony Dagradi, and Steve Masakowski, as well as Nolatet with Mike Dillon and Brian Haas.

He has also worked with Bobby McFerrin, Stanton Moore, Charlie Hunter, Willy DeVille, Robert Walter, Mose Allison, Johnny Adams, Professor Longhair, James Booker, and Alvin Tyler. He began teaching at Loyola University New Orleans in 1982.

== Discography ==
- Mystery Street (Chebasco, 1995)
- Banks Street (Chebasco, 1996)
- Vidacovich (Paw Maw, 2002)
- We Came to Play with June Yamagishi, George Porter Jr. (Trio, 2003)
- 'bout Time (Paw Maw, 2020)
- Out Da Box (Paw Maw, 2023)

With Ray Anderson

- Blues Bred in the Bone (Enja, 1988)

With John Scofield

- Flat Out (Gramavision, 1989)

== Awards and honors ==
- Served as King Robustus XL, Krewe of O.A.K. Mardi Gras parade, 2026
- Lifetime Achievement in Music (2020, Gambit's Big Easy Entertainment Award)
- Best Drummer (12 wins between 1997 and 2018, OffBeat magazine's Best of the Beat Award)
- Lifetime Achievement Award (2016, OffBeat)
- Best Contemporary Jazz Drummer (1995 and 1996, OffBeat)
- Best Contemporary Jazz Album: Banks Street (1996, OffBeat)
- Best Contemporary Jazz Album: Mystery Street (1995, OffBeat)
