= The Complete Last Waltz =

Rock show

- Tour by Various
- Location: United States
- Legs: 1

The Complete Last Waltz is a live rock show put on by Golden Gate Presents, including all 41 songs from the historic 1976 rock and roll concert The Last Waltz. Thirty eight musicians from current rock bands participated in the original presentation on November 24, 2012, at The Warfield Theater in San Francisco. In 2013, 2014, 2016 & 2018 the show was performed at The Capitol Theatre in Port Chester, NY.

The musical director for the show is Sam Cohen, and the core band is composed of Joe Russo on drums, Dave Dreiwitz on bass, Marco Benevento on keyboards, Scott Metzger on guitar, Josh Kaufman, Jon Shaw, and Alecia Chakour. The horn section is composed of Stuart D. Bogie, Martín Perna, Jordan McLean, Raymond Mason and John Altieri, also known as "the Antibalas horns". Since 2013, Jeff Chimenti has been added on piano to the core band.

Additional band members include or have included Cass McCombs, Kevin Morby, Wilco’s Nels Cline, Clap Your Hands Say Yeah’s Alec Ounsworth, The Dap-Kings’ Binky Griptite, Fruit Bats' Eric D. Johnson (formerly of The Shins), Blitzen Trapper’s Eric Earley, The Low Anthem’s Jocie Adams, Vetiver’s Andy Cabic, The Long Winters’ John Roderick, Nada Surf’s Ira Elliot, Apollo Sunshine’s Jeremy Black, Nicole Atkins, Guster’s Ryan Miller, the Parkington Sisters, Delta Spirit’s Matthew Logan Vasquez, Rob Burger, Scott McMicken and Eric Slick of Dr. Dog, and Ian Ball of Gomez.

== 2012 Performance ==
Song	Vocalist(s)
"Last Waltz Theme (instrumental)"	Stuart D. Bogie, Martín Perna, Jordan McLean, John Altieri, Aaron Johnson, Jon Shaw, Eric Slick, Josh Kaufman
"Up On Cripple Creek"	Sam Cohen
"The Shape I'm In"	Trixie Whitley
"Who Do You Love?"	Trixie Whitley
"Life Is A Carnival"	Sam Cohen
"W.S. Walcott Medicine Show"	Alecia Chakour
"Georgia on My Mind"	Alecia Chakour
"Ophelia"	George Lewis Jr.
"King Harvest (Has Surely Come)"	John Van Deusen & Jason Abraham Roberts (lead guitar)
"Rag Mama Rag"	Ian Ball
"The Night They Drove Old Dixie Down"	Cass McCombs
"Stage Fright"	Cass McCombs
"It Makes No Difference"	Cass McCombs
"Such a Night"	Marco Benevento
"Down South in New Orleans"	Andy Cabic
"This Wheel's On Fire"	Andy Cabic
"Mystery Train"	Ethan Miller
"Mannish Boy"	George Lewis Jr.
"All Our Past Times"	Nels Cline
"Further on Up the Road"	Nels Cline
"Helpless"	Sam Cohen
"Four Strong Winds"	Sam Cohen
"Coyote"	Blake Hazard
"Shadows and Light"	Blake Hazard
"Furry Sings the Blues"	Jocie Adams
"Evangeline"	Sam Cohen & Jocie Adams
"Dry Your Eyes"	John Roderick
"Tura Lura Lural (That's an Irish Lullaby)"	Eric D. Johnson
"Caravan"	Eric D. Johnson
"Acadian Driftwood"	Eric D. Johnson & Andy Cabic
"Genetic Method"/"Chest Fever"	Instrumental/George Lewis Jr., Alecia Chakour, Joe Russo
"Caldonia"	Binky Griptite
"The Weight"	Sam Cohen, Eric D. Johnson, Sean Aylward
"Baby Let Me Follow You Down"	Scott McMicken
"Hazel"	Scott McMicken
"I Don't Believe You"	Scott McMicken
"Forever Young"	Scott McMicken
"Baby Let Me Follow You Down" (reprise)	Scott McMicken
"I Shall Be Released"	Scott McMicken, et al.
"Don't Do It"	Alecia Chakour et al.

== 2013 Performance ==
Song	Vocalist(s)
"Last Waltz Theme (instrumental)"	Stuart D. Bogie, Martin Perna, Raymond Mason, John Altieri, Jon Shaw, Crosby, Josh Kaufman
"Up On Cripple Creek"	Sam Cohen
"The Shape I'm In"	Kenny Siegal
"Life Is A Carnival"	Ryan Miller
"W.S. Walcott Medicine Show"	Alec Ounsworth
"Georgia on My Mind"	Alecia Chakour
"Ophelia"	Scott Metzger
"Rag Mama Rag"	Marc Black
"King Harvest (Has Surely Come)"	Jeremy Black & Jared Samuel
"Mystery Train"	Matt Vasquez
"Who Do You Love?"	Matt Vasquez
"The Night They Drove Old Dixie Down"	Cass McCombs
"Stage Fright"	Cass McCombs
"It Makes No Difference"	Cass McCombs
"Such a Night"	Marco Benevento
"Down South in New Orleans"	Andy Cabic
"This Wheel's On Fire"	Andy Cabic
"All Our Past Times"	Nels Cline
"Further on Up the Road"	Nels Cline
"Helpless"	Nicole Atkins
"Four Strong Winds"	Nicole Atkins
"Coyote"	Jocie Adams
"Furry Sings the Blues"	Jocie Adams
"Dry Your Eyes"	John Roderick
"Mannish Boy"	Binky Griptite
"Caldonia"	Binky Griptite
"Tura Lura Lural (That's an Irish Lullaby)"	Eric D. Johnson
"Caravan"	Eric D. Johnson
"Genetic Method"/"Chest Fever"	Instrumental/Kenny Siegal
"Evangeline"	Parkington Sisters
"Acadian Driftwood"	Parkington Sisters
"The Weight"	Ensemble
"Baby Let Me Follow You Down"	Eric Earley
"Hazel"	Eric Earley
"I Don't Believe You"	Eric Earley
"Forever Young"	Eric Earley
"Baby Let Me Follow You Down" (reprise)	Eric Earley
"I Shall Be Released"	Ensemble
"Don't Do It"	Alecia Chakour, Scott Metzger et al.

== 2014 Performance ==
Song	Vocalist(s)
"Last Waltz Theme (instrumental)"	Stuart D. Bogie, Martín Perna, John Altieri, Raymond Mason, Josh Kaufman, Eric Slick
"Up On Cripple Creek"	Sam Cohen, Joe Russo and Alecia Chakour
"The Shape I'm In"	Kenny Siegal
"W.S. Walcott Medicine Show"	Kevin Morby
"Life Is A Carnival"	Ryan Miller
"Georgia on My Mind"	Alecia Chakour
"Ophelia"	Scott Metzger
"Rag Mama Rag"	Jason Gallagher
"King Harvest (Has Surely Come)"	Toby Leaman
"The Night They Drove Old Dixie Down"	Cass McCombs
"Stage Fright"	Cass McCombs
"It Makes No Difference"	Matt Trowbridge
"Such a Night"	Marco Benevento
"Down South in New Orleans"	Marc Black
"This Wheel's On Fire"	Erika Wennenstrom
"Mannish Boy"	Binky Griptite
"Caldonia"	Binky Griptite
"All Our Past Times"	Nels Cline
"Further on Up the Road"	Nels Cline
"Helpless"	Nicole Atkins
"Four Strong Winds"	Nicole Atkins
"Coyote"	Jocie Adams
"Furry Sings the Blues"	Jocie Adams and Nels Cline
"Mystery Train"	Matthew Logan Vasquez
"Who Do You Love?"	Matthew Logan Vasquez
"Dry Your Eyes"	John Roderick
"Tura Lura Lural (That's an Irish Lullaby)"	Eric D. Johnson and Ryan Miller
"Caravan"	Eric D. Johnson
"Genetic Method"	Marco Benevento
"Chest Fever"	Kenny Siegal
"Evangeline"	Parkington Sisters
"Acadian Driftwood"	Parkington Sisters
"The Weight"	Alecia Chakour and Mitch Chakour
"Baby Let Me Follow You Down"	Sam Cohen and Joe Russo
"Hazel"	Elvis Perkins
"I Don't Believe You"	Elvis Perkins
"Forever Young"	Elvis Perkins
"Baby Let Me Follow You Down" (reprise)	Elvis Perkins
"I Shall Be Released"	Ensemble
"Don't Do It"	Alecia Chakour et al.

== 2016 Performance ==
Song	Vocalist(s)
"Last Waltz Theme (instrumental)"	Stuart D. Bogie, Martín Perna, John Altieri, Raymond Mason, Josh Kaufman, Eric Slick
"Up On Cripple Creek"	Jesse Gallagher
"The Shape I'm In"	Kenny Siegal
"W.S. Walcott Medicine Show"	Sam Cohen
"Life Is A Carnival"	Ryan Miller
"Georgia on My Mind"	Alecia Chakour
"Ophelia"	Scott Metzger
"Rag Mama Rag"	Langhorne Slim
"King Harvest (Has Surely Come)"	Delicate Steve, Rayland Baxter
"The Night They Drove Old Dixie Down"	Curtis Harding
"Stage Fright"	Matt Trowbridge
"It Makes No Difference"	Rayland Baxter
"Such a Night"	Marco Benevento
"Down South in New Orleans"	Collab
"This Wheel's On Fire"	
"Mannish Boy"	Binky Griptite
"Caldonia"	Binky Griptite
"All Our Past Times"	Nels Cline
"Further on Up the Road"	Nels Cline
"Helpless"	Nicole Atkins
"Four Strong Winds"	Nicole Atkins
"Coyote"	Natalie Prass
"Furry Sings the Blues"	Jocie Adams
"Mystery Train"	Matthew Logan Vasquez
"Who Do You Love?"	Matthew Logan Vasquez
"Dry Your Eyes"	John Roderick
"Tura Lura Lural (That's an Irish Lullaby)"	Eric D. Johnson and Ryan Miller
"Caravan"	Eric D. Johnson
"Genetic Method"	Marco Benevento
"Chest Fever"	Kenny Siegal
"Evangeline"	Parkington Sisters
"Acadian Driftwood"	Parkington Sisters
"The Weight"	Joe Russo, Scott Metzger, Sam Cohen, Binky Griptite
"Baby Let Me Follow You Down"	Matthew Houck
"Hazel"	Matthew Houck
"I Don't Believe You"	Matthew Houck
"Forever Young"	Matthew Houck
"Baby Let Me Follow You Down" (reprise)	Matthew Houck
"I Shall Be Released"	Ensemble
"Don't Do It"	

== 2018 Performance ==
Song	Vocalist(s)
"Last Waltz Theme (instrumental)"	Stuart D. Bogie, Martín Perna, John Altieri, Raymond Mason, Josh Kaufman, Eric Slick
"Up On Cripple Creek"	Sam Cohen
"The Shape I'm In"	Chris Braun
"W.S. Walcott Medicine Show"	Matthew White
"Life Is A Carnival"	Craig Finn
"Georgia on My Mind"	Alecia Chakour
"Ophelia"	Scott Metzger
"Rag Mama Rag"	King Tuff
"King Harvest (Has Surely Come)"	Delicate Steve, Alecia Chakour
"The Night They Drove Old Dixie Down"	Katie Crutchfield
"Stage Fright"	Matt Trowbridge
"It Makes No Difference"	Leslie Mendelson
"Such a Night"	Marco Benevento
"Down South in New Orleans"	Andy Cabic
"This Wheel's On Fire"	Kyle Thomas
"Mannish Boy"	Binky Griptite
"Caldonia"	Binky Griptite
"All Our Past Times"	Nels Cline
"Further On Up the Road"	Nels Cline
"Helpless"	Nicole Atkins
"Four Strong Winds"	Nicole Atkins
"Coyote"	Lola Kirke
"Shadows and Light"	Meg Duffy
"Furry Sings the Blues"	Jocie Adams
"Mystery Train"	Matthew Logan Vasquez
"Who Do You Love?"	Matthew Logan Vasquez
"Dry Your Eyes"	John Roderick
"Tura Lura Lural (That's an Irish Lullaby)"	Eric D. Johnson and Alecia Chakour
"Caravan"	Eric D. Johnson
"Genetic Method"	Marco Benevento
"Chest Fever"	Chris Braun
"Evangeline"	Parkington Sisters
"Acadian Driftwood"	Parkington Sisters
"The Weight"	Joe Russo, Scott Metzger, Sam Cohen, Binky Griptite
"Baby Let Me Follow You Down"	Kevin Morby
"Hazel"	Kevin Morby
"I Don't Believe You"	Kevin Morby
"Forever Young"	Kevin Morby
"Baby Let Me Follow You Down" (reprise)	Kevin Morby
"I Shall Be Released"	Ensemble
"Don't Do It"	Alecia Chakour, et al.

== 2024 Performance ==
Song	Vocalist(s)
"Last Waltz Theme (instrumental)"	TBD
"Up On Cripple Creek"	TBD
"The Shape I'm In"	TBD
"W.S. Walcott Medicine Show"	TBD
"Life Is A Carnival"	TBD
"Georgia on My Mind"	TBD
"Ophelia"	TBD
"Rag Mama Rag"	TBD
"King Harvest (Has Surely Come)"	TBD
"The Night They Drove Old Dixie Down"	TBD
"Stage Fright"	TBD
"It Makes No Difference"	TBD
"Such a Night"	TBD
"Down South in New Orleans"	TBD
"This Wheel's On Fire"	TBD
"Mannish Boy"	TBD
"Caldonia"	TBD
"All Our Past Times"	TBD
"Further On Up the Road"	TBD
"Helpless"	TBD
"Four Strong Winds"	TBD
"Coyote"	TBD
"Shadows and Light"	TBD
"Furry Sings the Blues"	TBD
"Mystery Train"	TBD
"Who Do You Love?"	TBD
"Dry Your Eyes"	TBD
"Tura Lura Lural (That's an Irish Lullaby)"	TBD
"Caravan"	TBD
"Genetic Method"	TBD
"Chest Fever"	TBD
"Evangeline"	TBD
"Acadian Driftwood"	TBD
"The Weight"	TBD
"Baby Let Me Follow You Down"	TBD
"Hazel"	TBD
"I Don't Believe You"	TBD
"Forever Young"	TBD
"Baby Let Me Follow You Down" (reprise)	TBD
"I Shall Be Released"	TBD
"Don't Do It"	TBD
