= My Jackhammer =

Studio album by Benevento/Russo Duo
- Released: January 1, 2003
- Recorded: 2002
- Genres: Acid Jazz, Rock

Benevento/Russo Duo chronology
My Jackhammer (2003)	Darts (2003)

My Jackhammer is the debut album from the Benevento/Russo Duo, released in 2003 under their own production. The duo began playing together during a residency at the Knitting Factory in New York City. After the release of their studio debut, they would release a collection of live recordings on their second record Darts later in the same year.

== Track listing ==
1. "Raindrops Whisper Words" - 9:21
2. "Sabia" - 7:00
3. "Improv I" - 12:32
4. "Seeup, Seedown" - 4:22
5. "Improv II" - 10:11
6. "My Jackhammer" - 16:38
7. "Curvedspace" - 6:01
8. "Impact" - 6:29
9. "Redbull" - 7:00

== Credits ==
- Marco Benevento - organs, synthesizers, keyboards
- Joe Russo - drums, percussion
