= Darts (album) =

Live album by Benevento/Russo Duo
- Released: July 1, 2003
- Recorded: August 2002, February 2003
- Genres: Acid Jazz, Rock
- Length: 1:12:31
- Label: Benevento/Russo Duo

Benevento/Russo Duo chronology
My Jackhammer (2003)	Darts (2003)	Best Reason to Buy the Sun (2005)

Darts is a 2003 album from the Benevento/Russo Duo. With Marco Benevento on keyboards and Joe Russo on drums, it was recorded live at the Knitting Factory and the Tribeca Rock Club in New York City. Russo had a residency at the Knitting factory and invited Benevento, a friend from middle school, to play with him. They would eventually release My Jackhammer and Darts in 2003.

== Track listing ==
1. "Abduction Pose" - 15:52
2. "Big Whopper" - 14:17
3. "Darts" - 11:23
4. "Ambiguously?" - 12:52
5. "Marzipan" - 18:08

== Credits ==
- Marco Benevento - organs, synthesizers, keyboards
- Joe Russo - drums, percussion
