= Live at Tonic (Marco Benevento album) =

Live At Tonic

Live album by Marco Benevento
- Released: August 7, 2007
- Recorded: November 2006 at Tonic, New York
- Label: Ropeadope Records
- Producer: Andy Hurwitz, Marco Benevento

Live At Tonic is an album by keyboardist Marco Benevento.

Benevento invited his old friend Andy Hurwitz (Ropeadope label boss) along to document the proceedings. Alternating between group and solo performance, Benevento played two sets a night and was joined by a different cast of musical co-conspirators for each show. The highlights were edited down, mixed and matched and presented here on three discs of wide-eyed, daringly fierce and cosmically joyous music entitled Marco Benevento--Live At Tonic.

Liner notes state, "recorded live at Tonic, 107 Norfolk Street, New York, NY (R.I.P.)"

== Track listings ==
- Disc One:

1) Clouds
2) Record Book
3) Fearless
4) The Arrival of Greatness
5) Sabbath
6) The Night Before October
7) Carnival of Souls
8) Prestidigitation
9) Moonglow

- Disc Two:

1)Pep Hippo
2)We're Using Time for Fun
3)Seems So Long Ago Nancy
4) You Must Be a Lion
5) Intro
6) Nobody Does It Better
7) Executive Session
8) Elmer's Tune

- Disc Three:

1) Bye Ya!
2) The Weathermen
3) Diego Garcia
4) Church of God Victory
5) Chalaza
6) Teardrop Tea
7) Birthday Boy
8) Gimme Some Lovin
9) Sing Sing Sing

== Musician credits ==
- Solo (November 15, 2006) disc 1: tracks 4,7; disc 2: track 3; disc 3: tracks 1,7
- Duo with Mike Gordon (November 1, 2006) disc 1: track 9; disc 2: track 8; disc 3: track 9
- Trio with Reed Mathis and Matt Chamberlain (November 29, 2006) disc 1: tracks 1,2,3,5; disc 2: 2,4,5,6
- Drum Night with Bobby Previte, Joe Russo and Mike Dillon (November 22, 2006) disc 1: track 6; disc 3: tracks 2,3,5,8
- Quartet with Dave Dreiwitz, Steven Bernstein and Claude Coleman (November 8, 2006) disc 1: track 8; disc 2: tracks 1,7: disc 3: tracks 4,6
- with Scott Metzger disc 1: track 7; disc 3: track 7
