= Hot Chocolate Massage =

Studio album by Tiny Lights
- Released: 1990
- Genre: Folk rock
- Length: 66:42
- Label: Absolute A Go Go
- Producer: John Hamilton

Tiny Lights chronology
Hazel's Wreath (1988)	Hot Chocolate Massage (1990)	Stop the Sun, I Want to Go Home (1992)

Hot Chocolate Massage is an album by the folk rock band Tiny Lights, released in 1990 by Absolute A Go Go Records. Jane Scarpantoni played cello on the album. "Wave" was a minor hit on college radio stations.

== Release and reception ==
Professional ratings
Review scores
Source	Rating
AllMusic	4.5/5 stars
Select	3/5

Trouser Press felt that extensive touring had given the band "muscle and maturity" and noted the overall live feeling of the album. The AllMusic critic Jason Ankeny criticized the album for lacking focus because of excessive experimentation. Despite this he gave it four and a half out of five stars, calling the high points of Hot Chocolate Massage "sublime" and "daring and eclectic." Option wrote that "there's a wonderful sense of energy and daring to this LP that, more than a lot of current bands, brings the spirit of '60s experimental groups like the Insect Trust and the Ultimate Spinach to mind."

== Track listing ==
All music is composed by Donna Croughn & John Hamilton, except "Wave" and "Pushin' the Button" co-written by Dave Dreiwitz.

No.	Title	Length
1.	"Lavenderman"	4:58
2.	"Moonwhite Day"	4:39
3.	"Sweet Romance"	4:02
4.	"Bartholomew"	3:40
5.	"Wave"	4:38
6.	"Closer"	5:24
7.	"Evil"	4:33
8.	"Big Straw Hat"	2:52
9.	"After All"	6:46
10.	"Crawl"	3:30
11.	"H. C. M."	1:44
12.	"Pushin' the Button"	3:32
13.	"Tuesday Afternoon"	16:24

== Personnel ==
Tiny Lights

- Donna Croughn – vocals, violin
- Andy Demos – drums, clarinet, soprano saxophone, tenor saxophone
- Dave Dreiwitz – bass guitar, trumpet, vocals
- John Hamilton – guitar, vocals, production
- Jane Scarpantoni – cello, vocals

Additional musicians

- Henry Hirsch – clavinet on "Closer"
