= Prayer for the Halcyon Fear =

Studio album by Tiny Lights
- Released: 1985
- Recorded: Waterfront Studios, Hoboken, NJ
- Genre: Folk rock
- Length: 29:43 (vinyl edition); 36:43 (CD & cassette edition)
- Label: Uriel Music
- Producer: Donna Croughn, Jonathan Hamilton, Henry Hirsch

Tiny Lights chronology
Prayer for the Halcyon Fear (1985)	Hazel's Wreath (1988)

Prayer for the Halcyon Fear is the debut album of folk rock band Tiny Lights, released in 1985 through Uriel Music.

== Release and reception ==
Professional ratings
Review scores
Source	Rating
Allmusic	4/5 stars

Nitsuh Abebe of allmusic said the album has "the continual loose brilliance that's typically only found on debut records." He awarded Prayer for the Halcyon Fear four out of five stars, calling it the band's best effort to date. Critics of the Trouser Press called it "a delightful debut" that has "a mildly psychedelic sense of play that sets the band apart."

In 1990, the album was re-issued by Absolute A Go Go Records on CD and cassette, containing "Flowers Through the Air" and "Zippity-Do-Dah" as bonus material. Bob Bert provided liner notes which detailed the band's history.

== Track listing ==
All lyrics are written by Donna Croughn & John Hamilton, except "Sweet Solutions" by Jane Scarpantoni; all music is composed by Donna Croughn & John Hamilton.

Side one
No.	Title	Length
1.	"Country Song"	3:50
2.	"Singing at Your Door"	3:01
3.	"Song of the Weak"	3:12
4.	"G. Does the Limbo"	3:35

Side two
No.	Title	Length
1.	"Sweet Solutions"	3:51
2.	"Painted Skies"	4:20
3.	"Chesterfield Gorge"	5:30
4.	"Blue Dot Cleanser"	2:19

CD & Cassette Version
No.	Title	Length
1.	"Flowers Through the Air"	3:57
2.	"Zippity-Do-Dah"	3:02
3.	"Country Song"	3:50
4.	"Singing at Your Door"	3:01
5.	"Song of the Weak"	3:12
6.	"G. Does the Limbo"	3:35
7.	"Sweet Solutions"	3:51
8.	"Painted Skies"	4:20
9.	"Chesterfield Gorge"	5:30
10.	"Blue Dot Cleanser"	2:19

== Personnel ==
Tiny Lights

- Donna Croughn – vocals, violin, percussion, production
- Andy Demos – drums, soprano saxophone
- Dave Dreiwitz – bass guitar, double bass, trumpet
- John Hamilton – guitar, acoustic guitar, vocals, piano, production
- Jane Scarpantoni – cello, vocals

Additional musicians and production

- Henry Hirsch – production, vocals and keyboards on "Song of the Weak" & "G. Does the Limbo"
