= Invisible Baby =

Studio album by Marco Benevento
- Released: February 12, 2008
- Recorded: August 6, 2007 at Avast! Seattle Washington and October 22, 2007 at Trout Studios Brooklyn, NY
- Genre: Post-jazz
- Length: 41:56
- Label: Hyena Records
- Producer: Marco Benevento

Marco Benevento chronology
Live at Tonic (2007)	Invisible Baby (2008)	Me Not Me (2009)

Professional ratings
Review scores
Source	Rating
All About Jazz	3/5 stars
AllMusic	4.5/5 stars
PopMatters	6/10

Invisible Baby is the first solo studio album by New York keyboardist Marco Benevento.

== Track listing ==
No.	Title	Length
1.	"Bus Ride"	4:13
2.	"Record Book"	6:51
3.	"Atari"	4:11
4.	"The Real Morning Party"	4:55
5.	"You Must Be A Lion"	4:39
6.	"If You Keep Asking Me"	6:56
7.	"Ruby"	4:16
8.	"Are You The Favorite Person Of Anybody?"	5:49
Total length:		41:56

== Personnel ==
Adapted from liner notes.

=== Musicians ===
- Marco Benevento – piano, mellotron, circuit bent toys, keyboards
- Reed Mathis – bass (Tea Leaf Green, Jacob Fred Jazz Odyssey)
- Matt Chamberlain – drums (Tori Amos, Critters Buggin)
- Andrew Barr – drums (The Slip)
