= Hazel's Wreath =

Studio album by Tiny Lights
- Released: 1988
- Genre: Folk rock
- Length: 33:55
- Label: Gaia
- Producer: John Hamilton

Tiny Lights chronology
Prayer for the Halcyon Fear (1985)	Hazel's Wreath (1988)	Hot Chocolate Massage (1990)

Hazel's Wreath is the second album by folk rock band Tiny Lights, released in 1988 through Gaia Records.

== Release and reception ==
Professional ratings
Review scores
Source	Rating
Allmusic	3/5 stars

Although it was not as warmly received as its predecessor has been, Hazel's Wreath still garnered favorable reviews. Critics of the Trouser Press said despite its shortcomings the records "a solid mix of solemnity and abandon"

== Track listing ==
No.	Title	Length
1.	"Around It Goes Around"	3:25
2.	"Green Instead"	5:21
3.	"The Bridge"	4:08
4.	"Wickerman's Dog"	2:24
5.	"Colors and the Light"	3:29
6.	"Grown-up Fish"	4:32
7.	"The Capricious Yearnings of King Edward"	3:09
8.	"Before You Go"	2:38
9.	"Red Planet"	4:49

== Personnel ==
Tiny Lights

- Donna Croughn – vocals, violin
- Andy Demos – drums, tabla, soprano saxophone
- Dave Dreiwitz – bass guitar, trumpet, vocals
- John Hamilton – guitar, sitar, mandolin, vocals, production
- Jane Scarpantoni – cello

Additional musicians and production

- Laura Demos – flute on "Around It Goes Around"
- Barbara Dreiwitz – tuba on "Colors and the Light"
- Dick Dreiwitz – trombone on "Colors and the Light"
- Henry Hirsch – piano on "Grown-up Fish"
- Jack Petruzzelli – mellotron on "Red Planet"
