= Milky Juicy =

Studio album by Tiny Lights
- Released: 1994
- Genre: Folk rock
- Length: 39:11
- Label: Doctor Dream
- Producer: Donna Croughn, John Hamilton

Tiny Lights chronology
Stop the Sun, I Want to Go Home (1992)	Milky Juicy (1994)	The Smaller the Grape, the Sweeter the Wine (1997)

Milky Juicy is an album by folk rock band Tiny Lights, released in 1994 through Doctor Dream Records.

== Release and reception ==
Professional ratings
Review scores
Source	Rating
AllMusic	1.5/5 stars

Nitsuh Abebe of AllMusic gave it two and a half out of five stars, stating that the album contains few redeeming qualities and sounds dull compared to the band's previous output. Trouser Press wrote that "Milky Juicy is the band’s most adventurous, eclectic record. Comfortable in what it can do but undaunted by what it can’t, Tiny Lights rifles through a sample-book’s worth of styles, never sticking with one sound two songs in a row." Spin deemed the album "a whimsical AM-FM radio hybrid circa 1972 with the Beatles, Black Sabbath, Funkadelic, and Dusty Springfield beaming in." The New Yorker called the album "a delight" and a "breezy AM-influenced hodgepodge of rock, folk, jazz, blues, and R&B."

== Track listing ==
All music is composed by Donna Croughn and John Hamilton.

No.	Title	Length
1.	"Ashtray, Part One"	2:52
2.	"I Don't Enjoy Life"	2:50
3.	"Circle Sky"	2:34
4.	"Fishing Season"	4:41
5.	"Rattling"	4:47
6.	"Spinning"	3:44
7.	"Lit by the Sun"	3:20
8.	"Les Is More"	2:13
9.	"Shoulderback"	2:27
10.	"Yellow"	5:29
11.	"Ashtray, Part Two"	2:42
12.	"Tricycle Song"	1:31

== Personnel ==
Tiny Lights

- Andy Burton – piano
- Donna Croughn – vocals, violin, drums, production
- Andy Demos – drums, clarinet, saxophone
- Dave Dreiwitz – bass guitar, trumpet, vocals
- John Hamilton – guitar, vocals, production
- John Kruth – flute, mandolin
- Catherine Bent – cello

Additional musicians and production

- Laura Vitalo – photography
