= Cranitch =

Cranitch is a surname. Notable people with the surname include:

- Johanna Cranitch (living), Australian singer-songwriter
- Lorcan Cranitch (born 1959), Irish actor
- Matt Cranitch (born 1948), Irish fiddle player
- Micheál Cranitch (1912–1999), Irish politician
