= Stop the Sun, I Want to Go Home =

Studio album by Tiny Lights
- Released: 1992
- Recorded: For the Record Studios, Orange, CA
- Genre: Folk rock
- Length: 61:37
- Label: Doctor Dream
- Producer: John Hamilton

Tiny Lights chronology
Hot Chocolate Massage (1990)	Stop the Sun, I Want to Go Home (1992)	Milky Juicy (1992)

Stop the Sun, I Want to Go Home is the fourth album by folk rock band Tiny Lights, released in 1992 through Doctor Dream Records.

== Release and reception ==
Professional ratings
Review scores
Source	Rating
Allmusic	2.5/5 stars

Nitsuh Abebe of Allmusic, who had lauded the band's previous work, did not appreciate the stylistic change of Stop the Sun, I Want to Go Home. He gave it two and a half out of five stars, concluding that while the music did not compare with the band's early catalog, the album contained enough flair to keep it interesting. On the other hand, critics of the Trouser Press felt it was band's greatest accomplishment and that cited "Better" as the high point of the album and the band's career.

== Track listing ==
All music is composed by Donna Croughn & John Hamilton, except "Everybody's in the Park " and "It's Really a Happening" co-written by Dave Dreiwitz.

No.	Title	Length
1.	"Curlyeyed Open Stare"	4:48
2.	"Sugar"	5:32
3.	"It's Really a Happening"	4:22
4.	"Better"	4:42
5.	"Everybody's in the Park"	4:43
6.	"Facedown (For Serge Gainsbourg)"	4:27
7.	"She/Song of O"	6:58
8.	"Miss Hose"	3:38
9.	"All to You"	4:21
10.	"Big Ghost"	5:09
11.	"Papermoon"	5:50
12.	"Planet Love"	7:07

== Personnel ==
Tiny Lights

- Donna Croughn – vocals, violin, illustrations
- Andy Demos – drums, clarinet, saxophone
- Dave Dreiwitz – bass guitar, trumpet, vocals
- Stuart Hake – cello
- John Hamilton – guitar, piano, vocals, production

Additional musicians and production

- Max Bowers – recording
- Kevin Croughn – illustrations
- Eric O’Brien Garten – recording
