= Best Reason to Buy the Sun =

Studio album by Benevento-Russo Duo
- Released: April 5, 2005
- Recorded: 2004
- Genre: Experimental rock
- Label: Ropeadope
- Producer: Joey Waronker

Benevento-Russo Duo chronology
Darts (2003)	Best Reason to Buy the Sun (2005)	Live from Bonnaroo 2005 (2005)

Best Reason to Buy the Sun is a 2005 (see 2005 in music) album from the Benevento-Russo Duo. Made up of only Joe Russo and Marco Benevento, playing only Keyboards and Drums, the Duo's debut studio recording is reminiscent of Medeski, Martin & Wood or late Phish, to such a degree that Mike Gordon, of Phish, toured with the Duo following the release of the album. This album builds on the live work that the Duo has been doing since the release in 2003 of Darts, a live album from the Knitting Factory. The album was rereleased in 2020 as a 2-LP set with Play Pause Stop on 180-gram vinyl with new liner notes and previously unpublished photos.

== Track listing ==
1. "Becky" - 4:35
2. "Welcome Red" - 5:20
3. "Sunny's Song" - 4:18
4. "Vortex" - 5:01
5. "9X9" - 6:05
6. "Scratchitti" (featuring- Skerik on tenor saxophone & Mike Dillon on vibraphone and timbales) - 5:34
7. "Three Question Marks" - 7:28
8. "Bronko's Blues" - 6:20
9. "My Pet Goat" - 15:09
