= Live from Bonnaroo 2005 =

Live album by Mike Gordon and the Benevento-Russo Duo
- Released: July 18, 2006 (US)
- Recorded: June 10, 2005
- Genre: Music

Mike Gordon and the Benevento-Russo Duo chronology
Sixty Six Steps (2005)	Live from Bonnaroo 2005 (2006)	The Green Sparrow (2008)

Benevento/Russo Duo chronology
Best Reason to Buy the Sun (2005)	Live from Bonnaroo 2005 (2006)	Play Pause Stop (2006)

Mike Gordon chronology
Sixty Six Steps (2005)	Live from Bonnaroo 2005 (2006)	The Green Sparrow (2008)

Live from Bonnaroo 2005 is a double disc live album from Mike Gordon and the Benevento-Russo Duo recorded live at the fourth annual Bonnaroo Music Festival in June 2005. It is a limited edition release, available only on the Internet via Gordon's own personal website and also as a download on the Live Phish website.

It captures Gordon and the Duo performing a number of Benevento/Russo original songs, as well as solo songs from Gordon and a couple of songs from his band Phish, albeit in a very different instrumental format.

== Track listing ==
=== Disc one ===
1. "9 x 9" - 7:53
2. "Sunny's Song" - 9:07
3. "My Pet Goat" - 19:11
4. "Best Reason to Buy the Sun" - 9:58
5. "Becky" - 7:13
6. "Welcome Red" - 9:42
7. "Foam" - 11:43

=== Disc two ===
1. "Hoe Down (Rodeo)" - 13:11
2. "Scratchitti" - 9:15
3. "The Beltless Buckler" - 18:12
4. "Mike's Song" - 23:16

== Personnel ==
- Mike Gordon – bass
- Marco Benevento – keyboards
- Joe Russo – drums
- Gabby La La – sitar on "The Beltless Buckler"
