= Acid Tongue (band) =

Rock band from Seattle

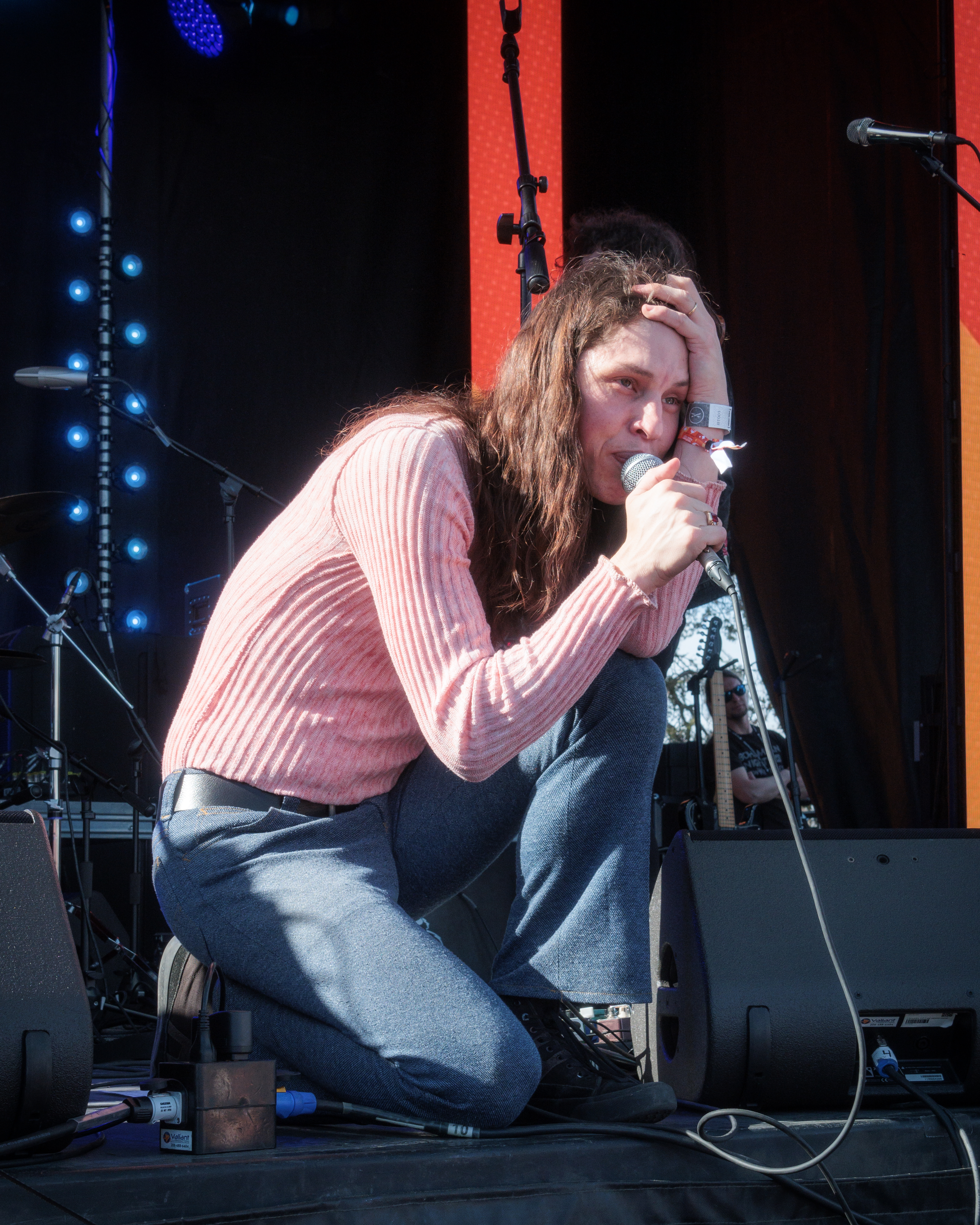
- Acid Tongue Live at Treefort Music Festival in 2022.

Background information
- Origin: Seattle, Washington, United States
- Genres: Garage rock, psychedelic rock, soul, punk rock, R&B, glam rock
- Years active: 2015–present
- Labels: Freakout Records, Le Cèpe Records, Lolipop Records, Failure By Design
- Members: Guy Keltner; Ian Cunningham; Faith Stankevich; Shaun Crawford
- Website: acidtonguemusic.com

Acid Tongue is an American rock band, formed in 2015 in Seattle, Washington. In 2022, Rolling Stone featured Acid Tongue on their In My Room concert series. To date, the band has released five studio albums and four EPs on Seattle independent label Freakout Records.

== History ==
Founded by songwriter and core member Guy Keltner (vocals, guitar) and visual artist Ian Cunningham (vocals, drums), the band currently comprises a rotating roster of musicians and tours internationally.

Guy Keltner and Ian Cunningham began recording songs in Seattle under the name Acid Tongue in 2015, and that year they released their first EP, I Died Dreaming. Keltner is the founder of the Freakout Festival in Seattle, and in 2015 the band founded Freakout Records with Skyler Locatelli, which has since released most of the band's records. Acid Tongue's debut EP caught the attention of KEXP and UK label Failure by Design, and was reissued in the UK in February 2016. Keltner subsequently began regularly touring the UK and recorded their second EP, Beautiful Disaster, in a London basement. The band's early sound incorporated elements of psychedelia, soul, and folk music.

Some of the band's earliest performances included support slots for King Gizzard & the Lizard Wizard (on their debut US tour), De La Soul, The Sonics, and The King Khan & BBQ Show.

On October 13, 2017, the band released their debut album, Babies, and extensively toured the United States and Europe in support of the release. Recorded in Seattle and Portland throughout 2016, the album was produced by Matt Drenik of Battleme, and was praised for its "DIY punk ethos" in Nylon Magazine. The band performed selected songs from Babies live on KEXP-FM in March 2018.

From 2016 to 2018, Keltner maintained a residence in Brooklyn, collaborating with Matt Gibbs of Evolfo for live performances, and recorded Acid Tongue's 2019 EP The Night We Broke Our Lease in Gibbs' Ditmas Park home. The band also began touring Mexico extensively during this time. Joel Gion of The Brian Jonestown Massacre performed the song "Careless" with the band at the 2018 Freakout Festival. In November, 2019, the band performed live on the King-TV program Band In Seattle.

The band reunited with Matt Drenik in the studio during their time off from tours in 2018 and 2019, and on March 13, 2020, they released their sophomore album, Bullies. The album marked a departure from their previous releases, mixing elements of glam rock and power pop with Motown-influenced string arrangements. The album generated notable press from Rolling Stone France, and they performed the song "Bullies" for the magazine's In My Room series. The band's decision to livestream their album release show due to the coronavirus outbreak was profiled in The Seattle Times. Bullies made the Top 90 Charts on KEXP-FM in March 2020. In 2021 the band performed songs from Bullies live for Jam in the Van.

During 2020, Keltner and Cunningham both relocated back to Seattle and spent a significant amount of time recording from home and writing music with some of their favorite artists. During this time, Keltner was diagnosed with bipolar disorder, and, struggling with addiction, decided to become sober from alcohol. These home recordings eventually evolved into the band's third album, Arboretum, released on December 3, 2021. The album features notable collaborations with Naked Giants, Death Valley Girls, Canadian singer Calvin Love and Seattle soul singer Shaina Shepherd. The album explored themes of loss and torment, and showcased the band's refined psychedelic glam sound. The band's live performance of the album's opening track "Home" was documented in Rolling Stone in February, 2022, and Rolling Stone France gave the album four stars. The Seattle Times named Arboretum one of the 16 best albums of 2021, and Hollywood Life named it one of the "Best of 2021". Radio personality John Richards chose the single "Take Me To Your Leader" for Song Of The Day on KEXP-FM in March, 2022. Arboretum reached #17 on the KEXP-FM charts in 2022. The band performed songs from Arboretum live on KRBX at Treefort Music Fest in 2021.

In 2021 Keltner founded the punk rock supergroup Mala Suerte in Mexico City, along with members of Carrion Kids, Los Honey Rockets and The Grizzled Mighty. In 2022, Keltner and Mala Suerte performed as the backing band for Papi Saicos of legendary Peruvian garage rock band Los Saicos, performing songs from Los Saicos' catalogue on tour in the United States and Mexico.

In November, 2022, Acid Tongue appeared live again on KEXP-FM, performing songs from Bullies and Arboretum, as well as a new single "Consumerism". On March 6, 2023, the band premiered "Consumerism" via Stereogum.

On April 12, 2024, the band released their fourth full-length, Acid on the Dancefloor and the title track was premiered via Rolling Stone.

On September 9th 2025, the band announced their fifth full-length studio album Scars. The album was released on September 12th. Three singles were released prior to the announcement, Scars, Values and She's a Teacher

== Discography ==
=== Studio albums ===
- Babies (2017, Freakout Records/Failure by Design)
- Bullies (2020, Freakout Records)
- Arboretum (2021, Freakout Records)
- Acid on the Dancefloor (2024, Acid Tongue)
- Scars (2025, Beast Records)

=== Extended plays ===
- I Died Dreaming (2015, Freakout Records/Failure by Design)
- Beautiful Disaster (2016, Freakout Records/Failure by Design)
- The Night We Broke Our Lease (2019, Freakout Records)
- Blossom (2021, Freakout Records)

=== Singles ===
- "Lately" (2015)
- "Beautiful Disaster" (2016)
- "Get Free/Careless" (2017)
- "If I Really Loved Her" (2017)
- "Humpty Dumpty" (2017)
- "If Lovin' You Was Easier" (2019)
- "Walk Don't Run" (2020)
- "Bullies" (2020)
- "Follow The Witch" (2020)
- "All Out Of Time" (2021) with Calvin Love
- "Rock 'N' Roll Revelations" (2021) with Smokey Brights
- "Take Me To Your Leader" (2021) with Death Valley Girls
- "Suffering For You" (2021) with Shaina Shepherd
- "Won't Walk Back" (2021) with Naked Giants
- "Consumerism" (2023)
- "L.S.D." (2023)
- "Blame It On The Youth" (2023)
- "Acid On The Dancefloor" (2024)
- "Don't Care" (2024)
- "Scars" (2025)
- "Values" (2025)
- "She's a Teacher" (2025)
