= Royal Potato Family =

- Founded: 2009
- Founder: Kevin Calabro, Marco Benevento
- Genre: Americana, rock, jazz
- Country of origin: U.S.
- Location: Brooklyn, New York
- Official website: www.royalpotatofamily.com

Royal Potato Family is an American independent record label based in Brooklyn, New York. The label's roster includes Marco Benevento, Seth Walker, American Babies, Robert Walter, Holly Bowling, Lukas Nelson, Neal Casal, Mike Dillon, Allison Miller, Superhuman Happiness, and Nolatet. The label was founded in early 2009 by Kevin Calabro and Marco Benevento.

== History ==
Royal Potato Family was created in 2009 by musician Marco Benevento and his manager/publicist Kevin Calabro as a method to release Benevento's music. Since Benevento's album Me Not Me, the label has added many other artists of varied musical genres, yet who are aligned with the founders' philosophy. "I’d like to think what makes us appealing to other artists as a home for their releases is that we’ve maintained our integrity over the years. We still honestly believe that music can make the world a better place. We want these records to be a soundtrack to people’s lives,” Calabro told NPR. According to Jambase, Royal Potato Family "has built a roster of artists and delivered a catalog of releases worthy of taking note."

Royal Potato Family records is staffed across the United States.

The name Royal Potato Family came from a joke that Bob Dylan told to drummer Matt Chamberlain.

Kevin Calabro recorded a TED Talk about "The Music Turns You On" at TEDxChichester, February 18, 2011.

On May 10, 2017, Calabro appeared on the Publicity Panel at the Relix magazine first-ever Live Music Conference at the Brooklyn Bowl in New York.

== Current artists ==
- 6 String Drag
- Allison Miller
- American Babies
- Ben Goldberg
- Billy Martin & Wil Blades
- Burnell Pines
- Decker
- DRKWAV
- Edward David Anderson
- Evolfo
- Garage A Trois
- Grayson Capps
- Holly Bowling
- Jacob Fred Jazz Odyssey
- Jenny Scheinmen
- Kirk Knuffke
- Leslie Mendelson
- Lukas Nelson & Promise of the Real
- Marco Benevento
- Matt Chamberlain & Brian Haas
- Mike Dillon
- Nathan Moore
- Neal Casal
- Nolatet
- Reed Mathis
- Robert Walter’s 20th Congress
- Seth Walker
- Skerik
- Stanton Moore
- Steven Bernstein
- Superhuman Happiness
- The Dead Kenny G’s
- The New Mastersounds
- Todd Clouser’s A Love Electric
- Wil Blades
- Willie Sugarcapps
- WOLF! Featuring Scott Metzger
- Yellowbirds

== Discography ==
Year	Album	Artist
2017	Life is Not a Football	Mike Dillon
2017	Woodstock Sessions	Marco Benevento
2017	Love & Murder	Leslie Mendelson
2017	Here on Earth	Jenny Scheinman
2017	Last of the Acid Cowboys	Evolfo
2016	Dropkick	Marco Benevento
2016	Functioning Broke	Mike Dillon
2016	Gotta Get Back	Seth Walker
2016	Otis Was a Polar Bear	Allison Miller/Allison Miller's Boom Tic Boom
2016	Prometheus Risen	Matt Chamberlain & Brian Haas
2016	Epic Battle Between Light & Dark	American Babies
2016	Something Real	Lukas Nelson & Promise of the Real
2016	The Story of Fred Short	Marco Benevento
2016	The Nashville Session	The New Mastersounds
2016	Till the Day I Die	Burnell Pines
2016	Dogs	Nolatet
2016	Lower Alabama: The Loxley Sessions	Edward David Anderson
2016	1-800-WOLF!	WOLF!
2016	Beathoven	Reed Mathis/Electric Beethoven
2016	The Wedge + Twist Reimagined For Solo Piano	Holly Bowling
2016	Better Left Unsung	Holly Bowling
2015	Distillation of a Dream: The Music of Phish Reimagined for Solo Piano	Holly Bowling
2015	Tweezer Reimagined for Solo Piano	Holly Bowling
2015	Arms & Hands	Kirk Knuffke
2015	Escape Velocity	Superhuman Happiness
2015	Made for Pleasure	The New Mastersounds
2015	Orphic Machine	Ben Goldberg
2015	Roots Rock 'n' Roll	6 String Drag
2015	Mountains of the Moon	Neal Casal
2015	The Purge	DRKWAV
2015	WOLF!	WOLF!
2015	The Battle for Earth	Jacob Fred Jazz Odyssey
2014	Stark and Red EP	American Babies
2014	Band of Outsiders	Mike Dillon
2014	Conversations	Stanton Moore
2014	Field Notes	Wil Blades
2014	Lies & Wishes	Ed Anderson/Edward David Anderson
2014	Sky Still Blue	Seth Walker
2014	Swift	Marco Benevento
2014	This is the Town: A Tribute to Nilsson, Vol.1	Various Artists
2014	Worker	Jacob Fred Jazz Odyssey
2013	A Love Electric: The Naked Beat	Todd Clouser/Todd Clouser's A Love Electric
2013	Frames	Matt Chamberlain & Brian Haas
2013	Frames	Matt Chamberlain/Brian Haas
2013	Get Thy Bearings	Robert Walter/Robert Walter's 20th Congress
2013	Hands	Superhuman Happiness
2013	Knives and Teeth	American Babies
2013	Hands	Superhuman Happiness
2013	No Morphine No Lilies	Allison Miller/Allison Miller's Boom Tic Boom
2013	Songs from the Vanished Frontier	Yellowbirds
2013	Willie Sugarcapps	Willie Sugarcapps
2013	Sexmob Plays Fellini: The Music of Nino Rota	Steven Bernstein
2012	Shimmy	Billy Martin & Wil Blades
2012	20th Century Folk Selections	Todd Clouser/Todd Clouser's A Love Electric
2012	Gorelick	The Dead Kenny Gs
2012	Sweeten the Distance	Neal Casal
2012	TigerFace	Marco Benevento
2012	Time Can Change	Seth Walker
2012	Urn	Mike Dillon
2012	Bandalabra: Live at the Royal Room	Skerik
2011	Always Be Happy, But Stay Evil	Garage a Trois
2011	Dear Puppeteer	Nathan Moore
2011	MMVI	The Devil and the Sea
2011	MTO Plays Sly	Steven Bernstein's Millennial Territory Orchestra
2011	Operation Long Leash	The Dead Kenny Gs
2011	The Color	Yellowbirds
2011	The Lost Cause Minstrels	Grayson Capps
2011	The Physical EP	Superhuman Happiness
2011	Race Riot Suite	Jacob Fred Jazz Odyssey
2010	Between the Needles and Nightfall	Marco Benevento
2010	Live At the Triple Door	Skerik's Syncopated Taint Septet
2010	Naked, Stoned, & Stabbed	Mushroom
2010	Stay Gold	Jacob Fred Jazz Odyssey
2010	The Rest of My Life	Yellowbirds
2009	One Day in Brooklyn	Jacob Fred Jazz Odyssey
2009	Leap of Faith	Seth Walker
2009	Power Patriot	Garage a Trois
2009	Ben Perowsky Presents: Moodswing Orchestra	Moodswing Orchestra
2009	Folk Singer	Nathan Moore
2009	Me Not Me	Marco Benevento
2008	Rott N Roll	Grayson Capps
2008	Invisible Baby	Marco Benevento
2007	Songbones	Grayson Capps
2007	Seth Walker	Seth Walker
2006	Wail & Ride	Grayson Capps
2005	Outre Mer	Garage a Trois
2005	If You Knew My Mind	Grayson Capps
