= The Smaller the Grape, the Sweeter the Wine =

Studio album by Tiny Lights
- Released: February 18, 1997
- Genre: Folk rock
- Length: 41:51
- Label: Bar/None
- Producer: Donna Croughn, John Hamilton, James Mastro

Tiny Lights chronology
| Milky Juicy (1994) | The Smaller the Grape, the Sweeter the Wine (1997) |

Professional ratings
Review scores
| Source | Rating |
|---|---|
| AllMusic | 3/5 stars |

The Smaller the Grape, the Sweeter the Wine is an album by the folk rock band Tiny Lights, released in 1997 through Bar/None Records. It was the band's final album. Jerry Harrison contributed vocals to "Maybe You Will Listen".

== Critical reception ==
Stereo Review concluded that "what's notable isn't just the range of styles—bubblegum pop, progressive/art rock, vintage soul, psychedelia—but the unaffected and warm-hearted way it all comes together."

== Track listing ==
All music is composed by Donna Croughn and John Hamilton.

| No. | Title | Length |
|---|---|---|
| 1. | "I Had It All" | 4:40 |
| 2. | "Pinprick" | 4:19 |
| 3. | "Maybe You Will Listen" | 4:50 |
| 4. | "Sing to Me" | 3:57 |
| 5. | "Whispering" | 3:51 |
| 6. | "Blue Sky" | 3:00 |
| 7. | "Tracy" | 2:45 |
| 8. | "Lazy Bones" | 5:54 |
| 9. | "No Baby No Songs" | 2:48 |
| 10. | "Would You Like to Float" | 5:47 |

== Personnel ==
Tiny Lights

- Andy Burton – piano, organ, mellotron
- Donna Croughn – vocals, violin, drums, production
- Andy Demos – saxophone, percussion
- Dave Dreiwitz – bass guitar, trumpet
- John Hamilton – guitar, vocals, production
- Ron Howten – drums
- Kevin Sztam – trombone

Additional musicians and production

- Jerry Harrison – additional vocals
- James Mastro – production
