= Reed Mathis =

- Born: September 27, 1976 (age 48); Saginaw, Michigan, U.S.
- Genres: jam band, rock, ambient, jazz
- Occupation(s): Musician, Composer, Bandleader, Producer
- Instrument(s): bass, guitar, cello, piano, sitar, mandolin, banjo
- Labels: Color Red, Royal Potato Family
- Website: reedmathis.com

Reed Mathis (born September 27, 1976) is a bassist, producer, singer, and guitarist who is best known for his 15-year stint as co-leader of the Tulsa progressive jazz band Jacob Fred Jazz Odyssey. The Bay Area rooted player has also notably worked with Grateful Dead members Bob Weir, Phil Lesh, Mickey Hart, Bill Kreutzmann. He played with Steve Kimock Band, and is a former member of Tea Leaf Green.

== Biography ==
Mathis comes from a prolific musical family and started learning the fundamentals of classical music when he was four years old. Before picking up the bass guitar at eleven, he spent time studying piano, cello, and voice. His early influences included Beethoven, The Beach Boys, Led Zeppelin, Cliff Burton of Metallica, Michael Jackson, and Jimi Hendrix.

When Mathis was fifteen he performed Vivaldi's "Mandolin Concerto in D" on mandolin with members of the Tulsa Philharmonic. At sixteen he attended the Interlochen Center for the Arts near Traverse City, Michigan, where he was the top-ranked bassist in the program. While at the academy he developed a love of jazz music, and began transcribing and memorizing the music of Charlie Parker, John Coltrane, Charles Mingus, Thelonious Monk, Miles Davis, Duke Ellington, Louis Armstrong and his Hot Five, and bass virtuoso Jaco Pastorius.

In 1994, Mathis met Brian Haas and a group of like-minded Tulsa musicians, who together created the Jacob Fred Jazz Odyssey (JFJO). Originally an octet, the band toured six years before becoming the piano-bass-drums trio for which it is known. Mathis continued to tour and record with JFJO through 2008.

Mathis' unique style and tone has been described as "talking bass." In a feature article in Bass Player in September, 2002, noted music author Bill Milkowski writes:

"No other electric bass player around today has been as successful (as Mathis) at incorporating mind-blowing and mondo-effects into a personal voice on the instrument. The charismatic Mathis is freed up to soar into the high register and wail with impunity on his heavy effected bass guitar because Haas is holding down the basslines on the Rhodes."

In 2005–2006, Mathis toured with the Steve Kimock Band, which featured Steve Kimock on guitar and lap steel guitar, Robert Walter on Hammond B3 organ and Rhodes piano, and Rodney Holmes on drums.

In 2006, Mathis united with pianist Marco Benevento and drummers Matt Chamberlain and Andrew Barr to form the Marco Benevento Trio. He has appeared on three releases with the Marco Benevento Trio and continues to tour with the group. The trio appeared at New York City's famed Carnegie Hall in June, 2009.

In late 2007, Mathis joined the San Francisco rock band Tea Leaf Green (TLG). In 2008, he split time between TLG and JFJO. He appears on the Tea Leaf Green's 2008 release Raise Up The Tent and tours as a member of the band.

In 2008, Mathis produced Jacob Fred Jazz Odyssey's "Winterwood" (named for Winterwood Studios in Eureka Springs, Arkansas). Shortly before the album's release in January, 2009, Mathis announced his departure from JFJO, citing a desire to pursue his other musical endeavors. Chris Combs (guitar) and Matt Hayes (upright bass) joined Haas (piano) and Josh Raymer (drums) to form the new JFJO lineup.

In 2009 Mathis became an original member of 7 Walkers, a band led by Grateful Dead drummer Bill Kreutzmann. He recorded on their self-titled debut album that was released on November 2, 2010. He left the band in 2010 due to touring commitments with Tea Leaf Green and was replaced by George Porter Jr.

Mathis performed with the Rhythm Devils for their 2011 tour, and with Mickey Hart Band in 2012. In 2014 Billy Kreutzmann formed Billy & The Kids, a new band featuring Mathis alongside Tom Hamilton, and Aron Magner. Also in 2014, The Golden Gate Wingmen was formed by John Kadlecik, featuring Mathis alongside Jeff Chimenti and Jay Lane. He officially parted ways with Tea Leaf Green in 2016.

In 2016, Mathis released his first album under his own name, "Beathoven" - a collection of trios Mathis assembled to improvise over the various movements from Beethoven's 3rd Symphony "Eroica" and Beethoven's 6th Symphony "Pastoral." Among the featured improvisors on are Page McConnell, Mike Gordon, Joe Russo, Marco Benevento, Matt Chamberlain, Stanton Moore, Robert Walter, The Barr Brothers, Mike Dillon, Jason Smart, Jared Tyler, Steve Pryor and Luke Bulla.

To tour in support of the album Mathis assembled the band that came to be called "Electric Beethoven," which featured Jay Lane, Tulsa guitarist Clay Welch, Todd Stoops, and Jacob Fred Jazz Odyssey's Josh Raymer. They recorded the live album "Maps We Found In The Ground" in 2017, and in 2018 they signed with Color Red Records, a boutique record label based in Denver Colorado.

Color Red released 5 singles from Electric Beethoven in 2019.

In 2021, Mathis announced plans to release six new Jacob Fred Jazz Odyssey albums, plus a documentary about the making of the albums and the history of the band.

In May 2021, Billy & The Kids performed three shows on the island of Kauai with special guests Billy Strings, James Casey, and Carlos Santana.

Mathis' second solo album "The Ladder" was released in June 2021, and features Mathis on lead vocals and writing all the lyrics & music, a first in his career.

== Discography ==
=== With Jacob Fred Jazz Odyssey ===
- Live at the Lincoln Continental (1995)
- Live in Tokyo (1996)
- Welcome Home (1998)
- Bloom (1999)
- Live At Your Mama's House (2000)
- Self Is Gone (2001)*
- All is One (2002)*
- Sean Layton: A Musical Retrospective (2002)*
- Slow Breath, Silent Mind (2003)*
- Symbiosis Osmosis (2003)*
- Walking With Giants (2004)*
- For The Ghost EP (2005)*
- Sameness of Difference (2005)
- Tomorrow We'll Know Today (2006)*
- Lil' Tae Rides Again (2008)
- Winterwood (2009)*
- Winterwood (2021)*
- The Spark That Bled (2021)*
- Nine Improvisations (2021)*
- Speak No Evil (2021)*
- Lil' Tae Rides Again (Extended Edition) (2021)*
- Winterwood Revealed (2021)*

=== With Tea Leaf Green ===
- Raise Up The Tent (2008)
- Looking West (2010)
- Radio Tragedy! (2011)
- In the Wake (2014)
- Looking West Redux (2021)*

=== With Marco Benevento ===
- Live at Tonic (2007)
- Invisible Baby (2008)
- Me Not Me (2009)
- Between the Needles and the Nightfall (2010)
- Tiger Face (2012)
- "Pink Elephants on Parade," Disney Jazz Vol. II: Everybody Wants to Be a Cat (2021)

=== As Reed Mathis ===
- Sean Layton: A Musical Retrospective (2006) w/ Sean Layton
- Now or Never (2010) w/ MSG (Matt Smith, Jeff Sipe)
- Beathoven (2016)*
- The Ladder (2021)*
- "Bye Bye Foot" (2021) Cluster Flies

=== With Electric Beethoven ===
- Maps We Found in the Ground (2017)*
- The Fifth (2019)
- The Ninth (2019)
- For Elise (2019)
- Moonlight Sonata (2019)
- The Seventh (2019)

=== With Billy & the Kids ===
- "Shakedown Street (Live)" (2019)
- "Help On The Way / Slipknot / Franklin's Tower" (2016) Dear Jerry: Celebrating the Music of Jerry Garcia (Live)
- "The Night They Drove Old Dixie Down" (2019) w/ Warren Haynes

=== With other artists ===
- Flourish (1996) Jenny Labow
- El Niño Chickendog (1997) Steve Pryor
- The Neighbors (1999)
- Blue Alleluia (2002) Jared Tyler
- Life's Ladder (2006) Jesse Aycock
- The Separation DVD (2007) Bobby Previte
- Sage Flower Arrow (2008)
- Here With You (2009) Jared Tyler
- 7 Walkers (2010) 7 Walkers
- Mysterium Tremendum (2012) Mickey Hart Band
- Brooklyn Sessions (2012) Everyone Orchestra
- Superorganism (2013) Mickey Hart Band
- Unsung Cities and Movies Never Made (2013) Page McConnell
- Under Branch & Thorn & Tree (2015) Samantha Crain
- Truffle Hunter (2019) Chad Galactic and the SuperFood
- Point of No Return (2020) Steve Kimock
- Kwishima (2021) BeatMower
- Universe (2021) BeatMower
- Bound to Fail (2021) Greg Loiacono, Jamie Drake

(*produced by Mathis)

== In Print ==
Interview in "Jaco: The Extraordinary and Tragic Life of Jaco Pastorius, Anniversary Edition," by Bill Milkowski.
