= Freakout Festival =

Rock festival in Seattle

Freakout Festival is an annual four-day underground music festival held at various venues around the Ballard neighborhood of Seattle each November. Since 2013, the festival has featured a mix of independent and mainstream performers, and has garnered press from around the globe. The programming primarily focuses on rock and roll, punk, and psychedelic rock music, but has also been known to include hip-hop, electronic and more experimental forms of music.

Headliners have included icons of garage, punk and psychedelic music such as The Seeds, Kid Congo Powers, Os Mutantes and Los Dug Dug's, alongside more contemporary artists such as the Night Beats, All Them Witches, Viagra Boys and Alex Maas of The Black Angels. In 2021, The Stranger named Freakout Festival "Seattle's Best Festival".

The organizers behind Freakout Festival also run the associated record label, Freakout Records, which has operated since 2015, releasing an eclectic mix of rock and roll records from the Pacific Northwest. Freakout Festival has also produced stages at SXSW and Treefort Music Fest, and collaborated with Mexico City's Festival NRMAL and The Lodge Room in Los Angeles. In 2022, Freakout established the "Freakout Weekender", a 2-day mini festival held in spring in collaboration with The Crocodile.

== History ==
Freakout Festival was founded in 2013 by Seattle musician Guy Keltner (of Acid Tongue), and was originally referred to as The Psychedelic Holiday Freakout. The first edition was held in the Capitol Hill neighborhood of Seattle, featuring 39 rock and hip hop artists from around the United States, including Jared James Nichols. In its second year, the festival moved to the Ballard neighborhood of Seattle.

In 2015, the festival hosted acts such as No Age. The same year, Keltner founded independent record label Freakout Records with his Acid Tongue bandmate Ian Cunningham and colleague Skyler Locatelli from KEXP-FM. The event was moved from December in 2016 due to heavy snowfall during a set of one of the performers.

Festival founder Guy Keltner is a second generation Mexican American on his mother's side, and his regular visits to family in Mexico City resulted in a strong connection to the punk community in Mexico and South America.

In 2021, Freakout organized an online concert series called Freakout Live!, which was profiled in Rolling Stone and featured performers from Paris, Toulouse, Madrid, Mexico and Seattle. In 2022, Freakout partnered with Seattle independent club The Crocodile to produce the two-day mini festival the Freakout Weekender.
