= Tiny Lights =

American music group

Tiny Lights, 1988

Tiny Lights was a music group formed in Hoboken, New Jersey by John Hamilton (guitar/vocals) and Donna Croughn (vocals/electric violin) in 1985. Original members include Dave Dreiwitz (bass/trumpet), Jane Scarpantoni (cello), John Mastro (drums). Based in Hoboken, New Jersey, the group frequently performed at Maxwell's and the Court Tavern in New Brunswick, New Jersey. They recorded a total of seven albums, two of which were later released on Psychic TV's Temple Records. From 1988 to 1994 Tiny Lights toured the United States extensively. A compilation album, The Young Person's Guide to Tiny Lights was released on Bar/None Records in 1995. Other members include Stuart Hake (cello), Andy Demos (drums), Catherine Bent (cello), Andy Burton (piano, organ), and Ron Howden (drums—formerly the drummer for Nektar).

The group's members employed a rich array of instrumentation, including cello, electric violin, trumpet, soprano saxophone, tabla drums and bass clarinet. Improvisation was a constant feature of their live performances. Rolling Stone memorably described the band as "Sly and the Family Partridge."

Dave Dreiwitz went on to play bass for the band Ween. Jane Scarpantoni has enjoyed a career recording and touring for artists including Lou Reed, Richard Barone, Bob Mould, 10,000 Maniacs, R.E.M., The Indigo Girls, Bruce Springsteen, and the Lounge Lizards. Donna Croughn recorded with Bob Bert for Bewitched on Sub Pop. Catherine Bent subsequently toured with Cirque du Soleil, has performed and recorded with jazz and pop artists including Joe Jackson, Lee Konitz and Kanye West, and is a professor at Berklee College of Music. John Hamilton and Donna Croughn are raising their two children, Jasper and Henry, in Cambridge, Massachusetts, where John works as a Professor of Comparative Literature and German at Harvard University.

On July 10, 2011, John Hamilton granted permission on behalf of Tiny Lights to host recordings on the Live Music Archive, linked below, and there is a small but growing collection of live recordings of the band that fans have been contributing.

== Discography ==
Studio albums

- Prayer for the Halcyon Fear (1985, Uriel Music)
- Hazel's Wreath (1988, Gaia)
- Hot Chocolate Massage (1990, Absolute A Go Go)
- Stop the Sun, I Want to Go Home (1992, Doctor Dream)
- Milky Juicy (1994, Doctor Dream)
- The Smaller the Grape, the Sweeter the Wine (1997, Bar/None)

Compilations

- The Young Person's Guide to Tiny Lights (1995, Bar/None)
- Can You Say Hoboken? Volume 6 (1996, Brave)

Singles

- Flowers Through the Air/Zippity-Do-Dah (1985, Temple)
- I Think I Just Want to Go Away/Pull It Together (1993, Kokopop)
- Horsehead/Pushin' the Button (1994, North Cedar)

Unreleased

- Know It You Love
