= Matt Drenik =

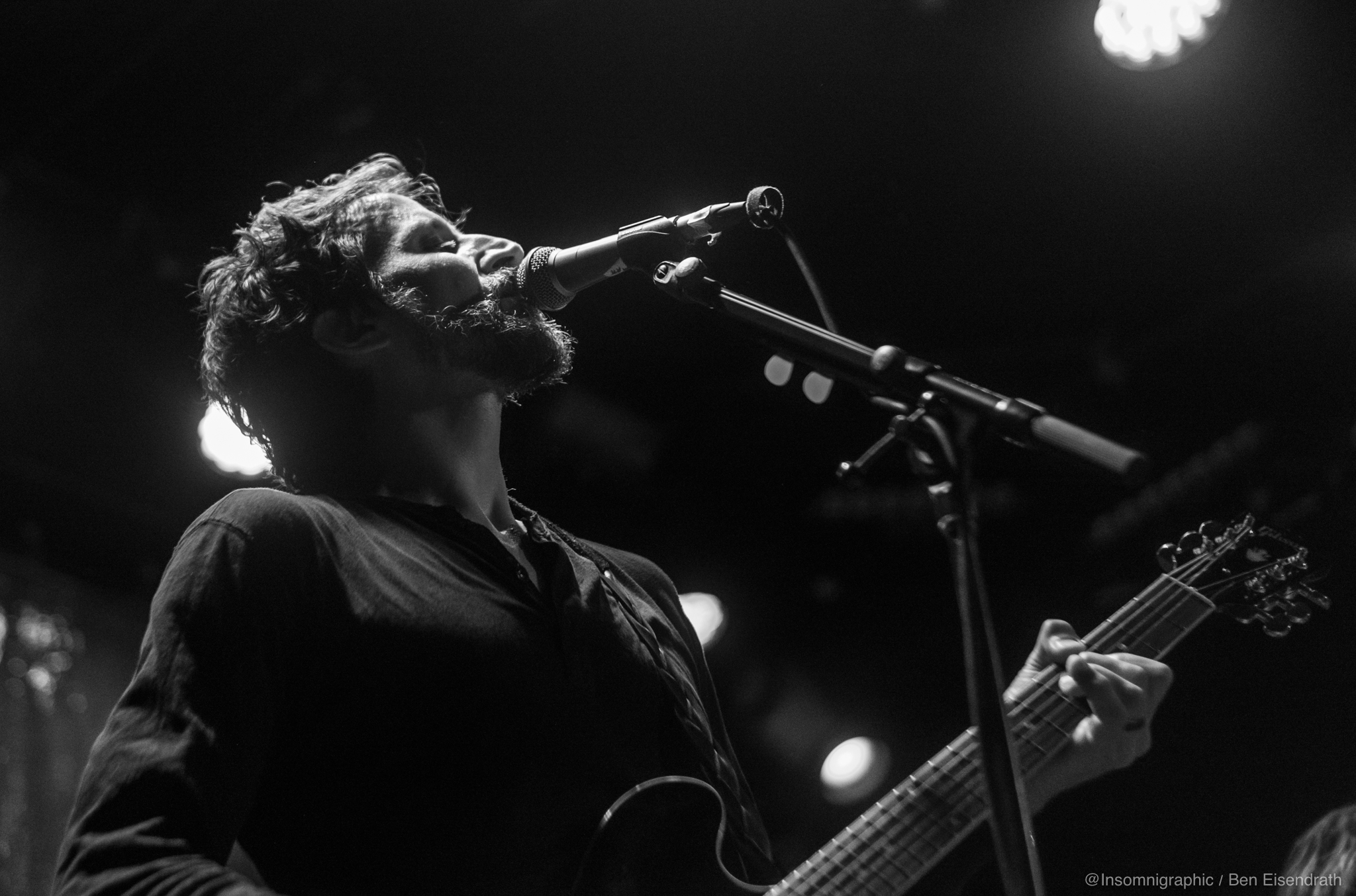

Background information
- Also known as: Battleme
- Genres: folk, garage, post-grunge, classic rock
- Occupations: Musician, writer
- Instruments: Guitar, bass, piano, vocals
- Years active: 2004–present
- Labels: El Camino Media, Sony Music Entertainment, 20th Century Fox Records, Get Loud Recordings, Trashy Moped Recordings, Maybe Records
- Website: getloudrecordings.com/matt-drenik

Matt Drenik (born June 18, 1979) is an American singer, songwriter, producer, and multi-instrumentalist. He's best known for his work as Battleme as well as a record producer for many acts including Louise Post of Veruca Salt. His songs have been featured in numerous films and television shows, most notably FX's Sons of Anarchy.

== Early life ==
Drenik was raised in Cincinnati, Ohio, and attended prep school St. Xavier High School, achieving All-American honors as a swimmer. His father, Doug Drenik, played football for the Ohio State Buckeyes. He has two older brothers, Doug Drenik Jr. and Jason Drenik. Jason was the founding member of Columbus, Ohio, cowpunk band, The Hairy Patt Band.

After attending the University of Florida on a swimming scholarship, Drenik dropped out and enrolled at Emerson College in Boston to study film. In 2000, he moved to Austin, Texas, and enrolled at University of Texas where he graduated with a degree from the RTF department.

== Career ==
Shortly before graduating, Drenik formed the garage rock band, The Good Looks, with fellow Austin musician, Christian Glakas. After a South By Southwest showcase and opening slots for bands like The Black Keys, the band broke up and Drenik formed Lions, a hard rock, post-grunge band, with drummer Jake Perlman, guitarist Austin Kalman, and bass player Trevor Sutcliffe.

== Lions ==
A hard rock, post-grunge band, Lions made several records and toured with Toadies, Local H, and others. They were briefly under a development deal with Roadrunner Records which helped fund their debut LP, No Generation, in 2007. Ultimately, the band decided to self-release it later that year. Their song, "Metal Heavy Lady", from their first EP Volume 1 was included in Activision's Guitar Hero 3, gaining them a cult following. Their last tour was in support of Monster Magnet in the UK in December 2009 after releasing their record, Let No One Fall, on UK record label Maybe Records. They had several high-profile UK press pieces, including spreads in Rock Sound and Classic Rock Magazine. Before disbanding, the band met a FX executive at a SXSW show and began helping to replace early soundtrack songs on a new pilot, Sons of Anarchy. Most of No Generation was licensed for use in the first season, including songs "White Angel" and "Machine". Their unique cover of Bob Dylan's "Girl from the North Country" used in the montage of the Sons of Anarchy Season 2 premiere has millions of streams. This led to a further collaborations between Drenik and show composer Bob Thiele Jr. that would last the entirety of the series run.

== Battleme ==
In 2010 Drenik moved from Austin, Texas, to Portland, Oregon, and started performing under the moniker Battleme, putting out four full-length LPs and two EPs on indie record labels Trashy Moped Recordings (owned by Thomas Turner Ghostland Observatory) and El Camino Media.

Drenik signed to Turner's Trashy Moped Recordings after his manager sent some rough demos to Turner. Turner had a favorable reaction and agreed to produce, mix, and put the record out on his label. Explaining in an interview to Best New Bands, "After he (Thomas) heard the songs, we hooked up on the phone and just started rattling off ideas. It was great. I don’t think he really cared about what others thought, or how many units would sell, or if we had a single. He just really dug the songs and wanted to put out the record because he thought it was cool. And that kind of meant everything to me." The two went on to collaborate with director Adam Kurland on a music video for lead single, Touch, which premiered on MTV Buzzworthy in 2012.

While the earlier releases relied on more folk and indie pop, the later ones transitioned into garage and 70s inspired rock and roll. Magnet (magazine) featuring Drenik in 2014, discussed the early transition away from folk during his first LP, "I cut eight songs that were more acoustic, bedroom-y stuff, and I started to get really bored, so I just started writing different kinds of songs,” says Drenik. “The cool thing was I didn’t have an audience yet, so I wasn’t really writing for anybody but myself.”

In 2013, Drenik began working with producer Doug Boehm on what would become his second full-length LP, Future Runs Magnetic. By the time it was released in 2014 via El Camino Media, Drenik has transitioned the project into a full-fledged rock band. Seattle's KEXP-FM first premiered the album to listeners noting, "Future Runs Magnetic is his first with a full band behind him, resulting in what KEXP Music Director Don Yates describes as "a bigger, more muscular rock sound inflected with glam, folk-rock, power pop." The band embarked on tours supporting both Toadies and Veruca Salt on their respective US tours throughout 2014.

The last Battleme El Camino release, 2017's Cult Psychotica, received 8/10 stars at AllMusic w/ reviewer Matt Collar stating, "the album is a red-eyed collection of fuzzy rock anthems, all centered on Drenik's throaty, nasal-pitched sneer. What he lacks in outright vocal resonance, he makes up for with strutting rock attitude and literate, philosophical lyrics that are equal parts Lou Reed and Elliott Smith." The last Battleme tour took place in December 2019 across Germany with English punk rock band, Peter and the Test Tube Babies.

== Sons of Anarchy ==
Drenik was also a guest member of Los Angeles-based group The Forest Rangers, alongside Bob Thiele, Dave Kushner, and Katey Sagal. They served as the house band for Sons of Anarchy. While being credited as Battleme, Drenik performed with the band on several occasions live, most notably at 2013's Hardly Strictly Bluegrass in Golden Gate Park. His version of Neil Young's "Hey Hey, My My" featured in the Season 3 finale has over 60 million YouTube hits.

== Critical response ==
In addition to his song "Metal Heavy Lady" being included in Guitar Hero 3. Rolling Stone has written about his music, as well as Billboard, Esquire, MTV, Rock Sound, Classic Rock magazine, Metal Hammer and others. In 2017, Classic Rock picked his song "Testament" as one of the year's best.

== Production ==
Drenik has worked with dozens of acts as a producer, including a solo effort from Louise Post of alternative rock band Veruca Salt. Drenik joined her on the US Sleepwalker tour as a band member. In addition to Post, Drenik has produced two albums by Seattle rock band Acid Tongue, as well as Grizzled Mighty, Charlie Hilton (Blouse), Battleme, Danny Dodge, and Miller Campbell. His most recent work with Miller Campbell was featured in SPIN's August 2024 print issue, as well as a world premiere for the single "All Night".

When Drenik moved to Los Angeles in 2018, he took a role as Creative Director at Los Angeles-based music company, South Music, a music production company primarily known for its award-winning work in short form advertising scores. Since joining the company, he has overseen music campaigns for Nike, Google, Activision, Cadillac, Jeep, AT&T, and Yeti. In late 2025, Drenik left South Music and started a new music company with fellow musician and creative director, Johanna Cranitch, called Little Beast.

== Writer ==
Drenik first contributed as a writer to an underground publication, Whoopsy Magazine, in Austin, Texas, owned by Chad Holt. He mainly published a column entitled, "Spitfire and Southern Grease", that chronicled the musings of barflies he encountered while running a bar in South Austin. After his move to Portland, he began contributing op-ed pieces to American Songwriter, Magnet, Talkhouse, and OPB Music.

== Discography ==
=== With Lions ===
- Volume 1 (2006 EP)
- No Generation (2007 LP)
- Let No One Fall (2009 EP)

=== With Battleme ===
- Big Score (2009 EP)
- Battleme (2012 LP)
- "Touch" (2012 single)
- Weight on the Brain (2013 EP)
- Future Runs Magnetic (2014 LP)
- Habitual Love Songs (2016)
- Cult Psychotica (2017)

=== Production ===
- Battleme
- Louise Post of Veruca Salt
- Miller Campbell
- Acid Tongue
- Chief White Lightning
- El Madre (Louise Post of Veruca Salt)
- Danny Dodge
- Aaron Behrens (Ghostland Observatory)
- Charlie Hilton (Blouse)
- Grizzled Mighty
- The Furies
- Jesse Vain
- Far Lands
- Felix Rose
- Hairy Patt Band
- Moon Darling
- Johanna
