= Levitation Room =

American psychedelic rock band

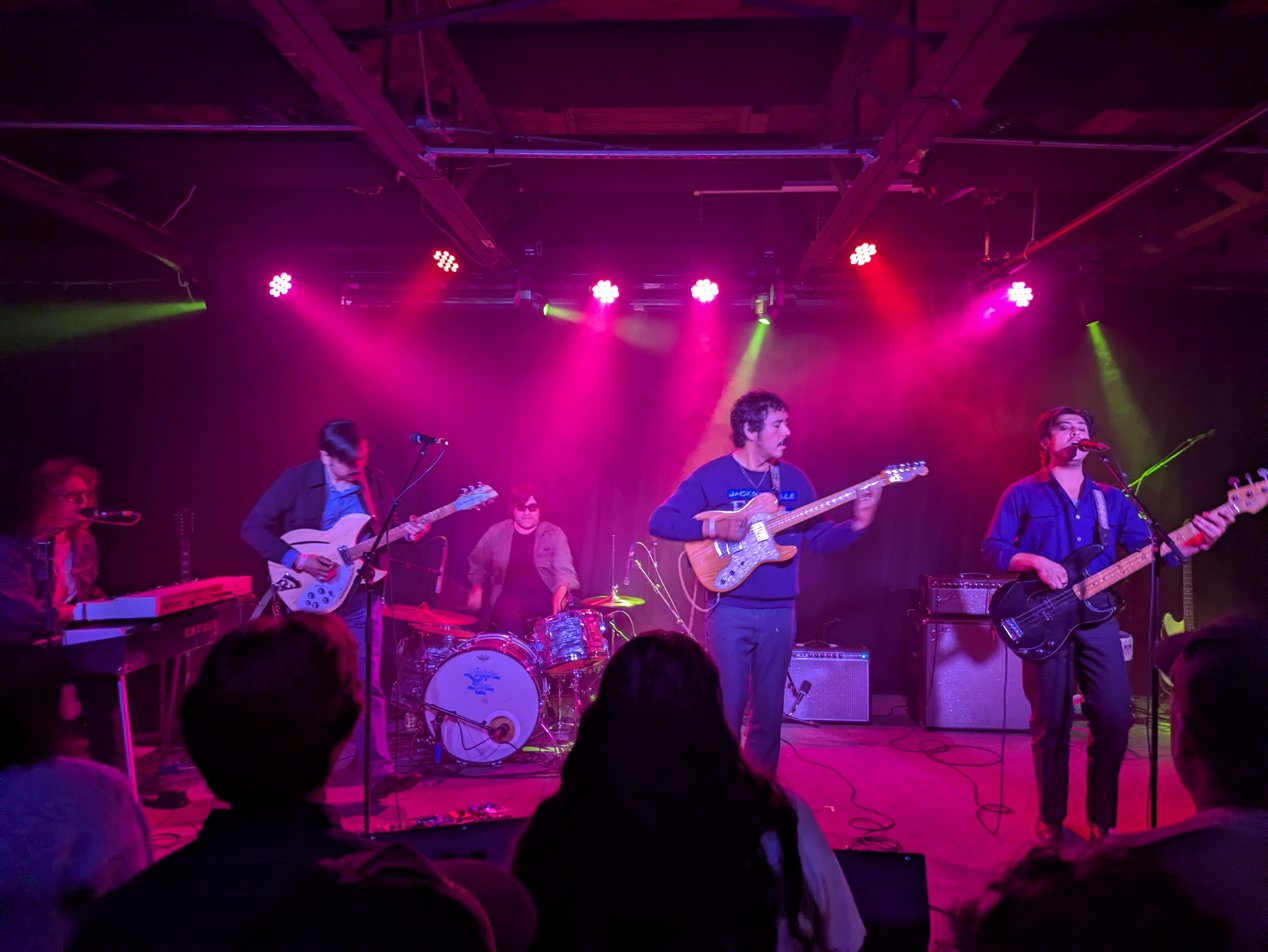
- Levitation Room at Urban Lounge, Salt Lake City in 2026

Background information
- Origin: Los Angeles, California, U.S.
- Genres: Psychedelic rock
- Years active: 2012-present
- Members: Julian Porte; Gabriel Fernandez; Kevin Perez; Jonathan Martin; Glenn Brigman

Levitation Room is an American psychedelic rock band from Los Angeles, California. They have three studio albums and one studio EP.

== History ==
Porte and Fernandez were in a band called The Hits. Porte left and tried to form a career as a solo folk musician but then honed in on a psychedelic sound instead. He posted on Facebook in search of band members and Fernandez was interested in leaving The Hits as well. They met drummer Martin at a party then rented a warehouse where they rehearsed and lived. The band formed in 2012. They played at the first ever Psycho Fest in 2013.

The band name came from an in-studio mushroom trip when Porte felt he was levitating.

On February 7, 2015, they released their debut EP Minds of Our Own on Burger Records.

They released their debut album Ethos on March 19, 2016, via Burger Records. It contained re-recorded versions of songs on Minds of Our Own. After Ethos they immediately began writing for a follow up. While touring for the album, they claimed to have encountered a UFO while driving through the desert and former bassist Chris Mercado claims to have been attacked by ghost while in a hotel room.

Their second album Headspace released on October 4, 2019, via Greenway Records. They have played with the bands Evolfo (in 2021) and Psychedelic Porn Crumpets.

Their third album Strange Weather released on February 16, 2024, via Greenway Records. New Noise Magazine labeled it their "most transcendent release to date."

== Sound ==
They have been described as "psych-rock".

Psychedelic Baby Magazine called their sound "clean, spacey, and meandering in a mildly controlled manner that will shimmer your nights with full moon delight, recapping the essence and vibe of the 60’s"

They have listed their influences as The Beatles, The Kinks, The Rolling Stones, The Pretty Things, Lazy Smoke, Grateful Dead, Pink Floyd, Buffalo Springfield, The Byrds, and Bob Dylan.

== Band members ==
Current members

- Julian Porte - lead vocals, guitar (2012 - present)
- Gabriel Fernandez - lead guitar, vocals (2012 - present)
- Kevin Perez - bass (2021 - present)
- Iggy - drums (2026 - present)
- Glenn Brigman - keyboards

Former members

- John Martin - bass
- Christopher Mercado - bass
- Brandon Graham
- Jonathan Martin - drums (2012 - 2026)

== Discography ==
Studio albums

- Ethos (2016)
- Headspace (2019)
- Strange Weather (2024)

Extended plays

- Minds of Our Own (2015)
- Levitation Room on Audiotree Live (2024)
- Equinox (2026)

Stand-alone singles

- "Warmth of the Sun"/"Midsummer's Daydream" (2018)
- "Quarantine" (2020)
- "Pienso en Ti" (2020)
- "It Happens All the Time" (2025)
- "Love Signs" (2025)
