= Seth Walker =

American singer (born 1972)

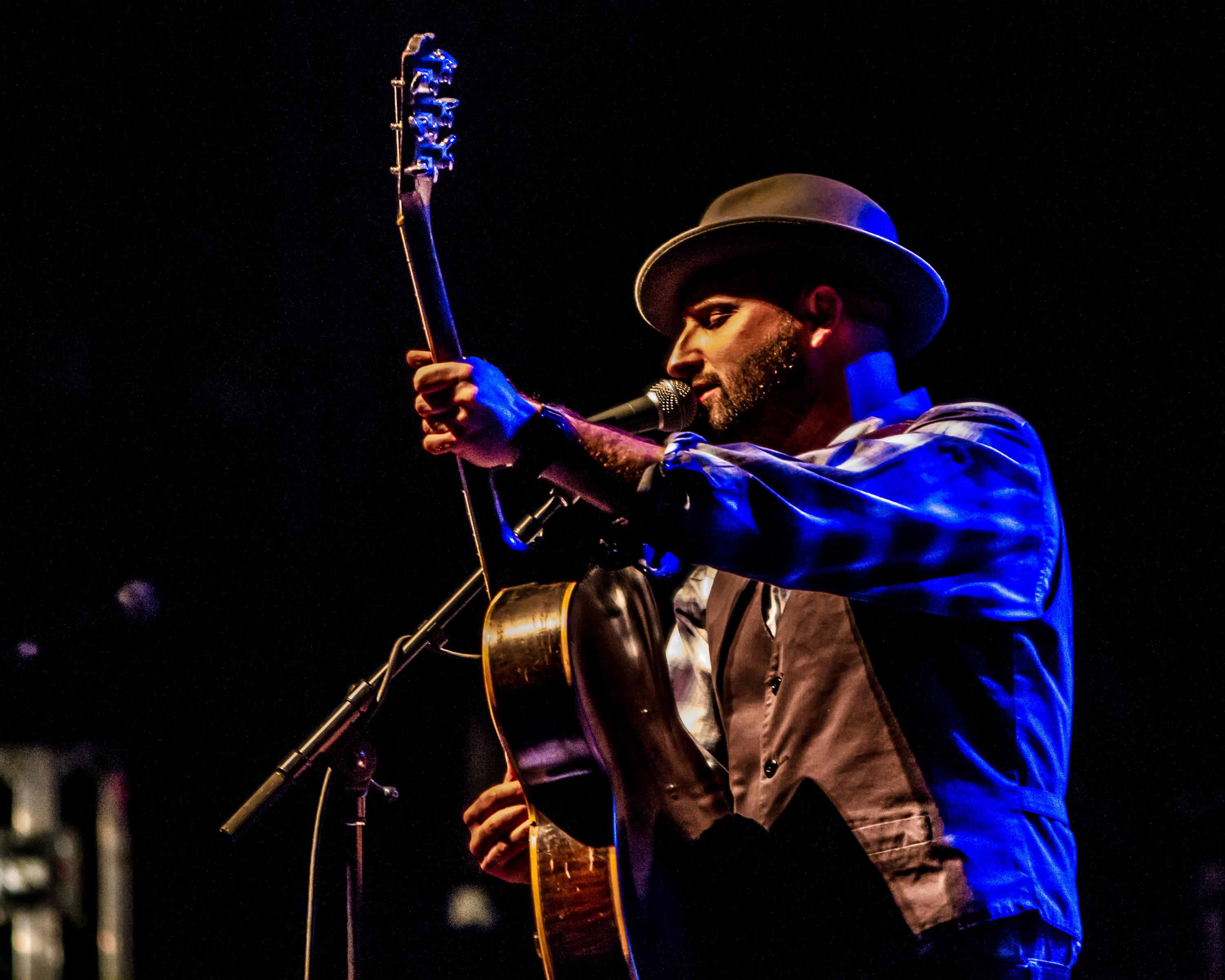

Background information
- Born: 1972 (age 53–54); Altamahaw Ossippee, North Carolina, United States
- Genres: Americana, blues, jazz
- Occupations: Musician, songwriter
- Instruments: Guitar, vocals
- Years active: 1990s-present
- Label: Various
- Website: sethwalker.com/welcome/

Seth Walker (born 1972) is an American electric blues singer, guitarist, and songwriter. He has released 10 albums to date, the most recent entitled Are You Open? (2019). Walker's musical genres include Americana, blues and jazz.

Gotta Get Back was released on September 2, 2016, and debuted at number 6 in the US on the Billboard Top Blues Album. His 2009 album, Leap of Faith, also charted on the Billboard Top Blues Album chart, peaking at number 2.

Delbert McClinton remarked "the first time I heard Seth Walker at a small club in Nashville I was impressed like I haven't been impressed in 30 years, with performance, presence, and great songs."

== Life and career ==
Walker was born and grew up in Altamahaw Ossippee, North Carolina, United States, with classically trained musical parents. He learned to play the cello at the age of three, and gravitated towards the blues in his teenage years, finding inspiration in the work of B.B. King, Snooks Eaglin, Ray Charles and T-Bone Walker. Walker attended East Carolina University where he studied art. His first public performance occurred in Greenville, North Carolina.

In his early twenties Walker moved to Austin, Texas, and began to develop his skills as a singer, songwriter and guitarist. His first album, When It Pours It Rains was released in 1998. Meet Me in the Middle (2000) was similarly credited to the Seth Walker Band. His 2002 album release was entitled Restless. On the Outside (2005) followed with a credit to Seth Walker and the Differentials. Walker's self-titled release, Seth Walker, appeared in 2006 and received critical acclaim from periodicals including No Depression, Blues Revue and Maverick UK.

It was after that release that Walker met the Grammy Award-winning Gary Nicholson, with whom he developed a songwriting partnership. This alliance led to his most successful release to date, Leap of Faith (2009), which was produced by Nicholson. Walker stated "this album was made during a time in my life when I was caught up in some shadows. The idea of a leap of faith actually does reflect where I was at personally and making this record was the light for me." The album contained tracks written by Walker alone, Walker and Nicholson, plus work by other songwriters including Nick Lowe and Percy Mayfield.

Walker performed at the Austin City Limits Music Festival in September 2011, and has toured supporting both Raul Malo and The Wood Brothers. The song "Back in Your Arms Again", jointly penned by Malo, Nicholson, and Walker, was recorded for The Mavericks' 2013 album, In Time, and released by them as a single.

Walker lived for fifteen years in Austin, before he relocated again in 2009 to Nashville, Tennessee, where he recorded Time Can Change (2012). After touring, Walker moved to New Orleans to record his 2014 album Sky Still Blue which was produced by Oliver Wood of The Wood Brothers. His album released September 2016 entitled Gotta Get Back was produced by Jano Rix of The Wood Brothers. Of Gotta Get Back AllMusic noted that "Walker explains in the liner notes that he looked back to his early childhood for what got him excited about music in the first place for the album, and that family played an important part".

His 2019 recording, Are You Open?, was chosen as a 'Favorite Blues Album' by AllMusic.

== Discography ==
=== Albums ===
Year	Album details	Peak chart positions				Credit(s)
Year	Album details	US Billboard 200	US Blues	US Top Heatseekers	US Top Independent Albums	Credit(s)
1998	When It Rains It Pours: Released: May 1, 1998; Label: N/K	—	—	—	—	The Seth Walker Band
2000	Meet Me in the Middle: Released: May 1, 2000; Label: N/K	—	—	—	—	The Seth Walker Band
2002	Restless: Released: June 26, 2002; Label: N/K	—	—	—	—	Seth Walker
2005	On the Outside: Released: January 11, 2005; Label: Seth	—	—	—	—	Seth Walker and the Differentials
2006	Seth Walker: Released: 2006; Label: Pacific Blues	—	—	—	—	Seth Walker
2009	Leap of Faith: Released: March 3, 2009; Label: Hyena Records	198	2	8	33	Seth Walker
2012	Time Can Change: Released: June 19, 2012; Label: Roe Records / Royal Potato Family	—	—	—	—	Seth Walker
2014	Sky Still Blue: Released: June 10, 2014; Label: Royal Potato Family	—	—	—	—	Seth Walker
2016	Gotta Get Back: Released: September 2, 2016; Label: Royal Potato Family	—	6	—	—	Seth Walker
2019	Are You Open?: Released: February 15, 2019; Label: Royal Potato Family	—	—	—	—	Seth Walker
