= Me Not Me =

Studio album by Marco Benevento
- Released: February 3, 2009
- Recorded: engineered by Tucker Martine, mixed by Bryce Goggin and mastered by Fred Kevorkian
- Genre: jazz; rock
- Label: The Royal Potato Family

Marco Benevento chronology
Invisible Baby (2008)	Me Not Me (2009)

Professional ratings
Review scores
Source	Rating
All About Jazz	(?)

Me Not Me is the second solo studio album by keyboardist Marco Benevento of Brooklyn, New York, released in 2009. It consists mostly of covers along with three original tracks.

== Track listing ==
No.	Title	Length
1.	"Golden" (My Morning Jacket)
2.	"Now They're Writing Music" (Benevento)
3.	"Seems So Long Ago, Nancy" (Leonard Cohen)
4.	"Mephisto" (Benevento)
5.	"Twin Killers" (Deerhoof)
6.	"Call Home" (Benevento)
7.	"Heartbeats" (The Knife)
8.	"Sing it Again" (Beck)
9.	"Friends" (Led Zeppelin)
10.	"Run of the Mill" (George Harrison)

== Personnel ==
- Marco Benevento: piano, optigan, mellotron, tack piano, clavinet
- Reed Mathis: bass
- Matt Chamberlain: drums [1,2,4,9,10]
- Andrew Barr: drums [2,3,5,6,7]
