= Strange Weather (Levitation Room album) =

Studio album by Levitation Room
- Released: February 16, 2024
- Genre: psychedelic rock
- Length: 31:25
- Label: Greenway Records

Levitation Room chronology
Headspace (2019)	Strange Weather (2024)

Strange Weather is the third studio album by American psychedelic rock band Levitation Room. It was released on February 16, 2024. It is the first album to feature bassist Kevin Perez.

== Background and recording ==
The gap between this album and Headspace was five years. During this time the band reflected on being a Los Angeles-based rock band and wanted to return with something very socially relevant. Many lyrical themes from this album stem from climate change.

They began recording in January 2023. There was "a lot of back and forth in terms of mixing the album" as well as songs that were cut. Julian Porte remarked that the band had re-recorded the album "like 3 times."

For this release the band collaborated with keyboardist Rob Campanella (former Brian Jonestown Massacre member), Jason Kick (of Mild High Club) and Joel Robinow (of The Black Crowes).

== Critical reception ==
Professional ratings
Review scores
Source	Rating
The Fire Note	4/5 stars
Prog Radio	4/5 stars

The album released to positive reviews. The Fire Note in a 4/5-star review said "It builds upon the Los Angeles quartet's established cosmic sound while delving deeper into dreamy, lo-fi atmospheres and '60s-inspired sonics." Prog Radio said "For fans who appreciate a blend of retro 60s psychedelic and spacey nuances within their progressive rock, "Strange Weather" promises to be a compelling listen."

== Track listing ==
All tracks are written by Levitation Room, additional musician noted on track 3.

No.	Title	Length
1.	"Heaven"	3:52
2.	"Strange Weather"	2:26
3.	"Cool It, Baby"	3:21
4.	"Grand Illusion (Expectations)"	2:55
5.	"Immortal Love"	3:47
6.	"Scene for an Exit"	2:39
7.	"Pintura"	2:19
8.	"Morning Star"	2:04
9.	"Revelations"	3:46
10.	"The Other Side"	4:12
Total length:		31:25

== Personnel ==
Levitation Room

- Julian Porte – lead vocals, guitar
- Gabriel Fernandez – lead guitar, vocals
- Kevin Perez – bass
- Jonathan Martin – drums

Additional personnel

- Timothy Stollenwerk – mastering
- Jason Kick – mixing, engineering
- Jensine Benitez – backing vocals (track 3)
- Glenn Brigman – piano (track 7)
- Joel Robinow – piano, keyboards
- Andre Poise – artwork, design
- Cloudy Thoughts – photography
