= Johanna Cranitch =

Australian singer-songwriter

- Also known as: Johanna, White Prism
- Origin: Sydney, Australia
- Genres: Indie rock; film score
- Occupations: Musician; writer
- Instruments: Vocals; piano; synth
- Years active: 2000–present

Johanna Cranitch is an Australian singer, songwriter, and composer. She is best known for her work as a film composer and as a touring member of the Cranberries from 2012 to 2017.

== Early life ==
Cranitch was raised in Sydney and attended the Australian Institute of Music where she graduated with a jazz vocal degree.

== Career ==
Upon graduation, Cranitch moved to New York City and began working as a recording engineer at Nola Recording Studios. During this time, she engineered and ran sessions for the likes of Liza Minnelli, Bette Midler, Hank Jones. While continuing to work at Nola, she began releasing music under the name Johanna and the Dusty Floor.

In 2007, Cranitch joined American rock band Wheatus as a backup vocalist until 2011. In 2012, she joined The Cranberries as a backing vocalist and keyboardist. She remained a full-time member of the band until 2017. She's credited as working on The Cranberries final album In the End, helping with the editing and completion of the late singer, Dolores O'Riordan, vocals.

In addition to the Cranberries, Cranitch also toured as a member of Nina Persson of the Cardigans's solo project.

She continued to write her own songs and began releasing them under the moniker White Prism.

== Production ==
In 2019, Cranitch joined Nylon Studios, a commercial music production company, and began writing music for advertising, as well as scoring her first feature film, Born Free, directed by fashion editor Paula Goldstein.

In 2023, Cranitch took over as creative director at Barking Owl Sound, where she oversaw the music for campaigns by Vogue, Apple, Lexus, and others.

In 2026, she left Barking Owl and formed the music production company, Little Beast, with fellow musician and collaborator Matt Drenik.

== Film score ==
After the success of Born Free, Cranitch began composing for short and feature films. In 2024, she scored the documentary feature, Takin' Care of Business, about Randy Bachman of The Guess Who and Bachman Turner Overdrive. It premiered at the Toronto International Film Festival that year. In 2025, Cranitch hooked up with Takin' Care of Business director, Tyler Measom, on a new project about the famed Los Angeles hotel, The Sunset Marquis Hotel titled "If These Walls Could Rock," which made its world premiere at the Doc NYC Film Festival that year. Her additional scoring work alongside Patrick Stump of Fall Out Boy for the Billy Idol documentary, "Billy Idol Should Be Dead," premiered at the Tribeca Film Festival in 2025 and was picked up by Hulu in 2026.
