= Play Pause Stop =

Studio album by Benevento/Russo Duo
- Released: July 11, 2006
- Recorded: Spring 2006
- Genre: Acid jazz, rock
- Length: 47:52
- Label: Butter Problems
- Producer: Matt Chamberlain and Tom Biller

Benevento/Russo Duo chronology
Live from Bonnaroo 2005 (2005)	Play Pause Stop (2006)	Split Sides, Volume 1 (2006)

Play Pause Stop is a 2006 album from the Benevento/Russo Duo. Made up of only Marco Benevento and Joe Russo, the album contains the two playing only keyboards and drums, respectively. As reviewer Benjy Eisen of NIPP writes, "it is a rock album — but there is no guitarist, no bassist, and you can sing along even though there are no words."

== Track listing ==
1. "Play Pause Stop" - 7:58
2. "Echo Park" - 3:44
3. "Soba" - 4:49
4. "Best Reason to Buy the Sun" - 5:40
5. "Powder" - 3:44
6. "Something for Rockets" - 6:06
7. "Walking, Running, Viking" - 3:17
8. "Hate Frame" - 8:14
9. "Memphis" - 4:17
