= Evolfo =

American rock band

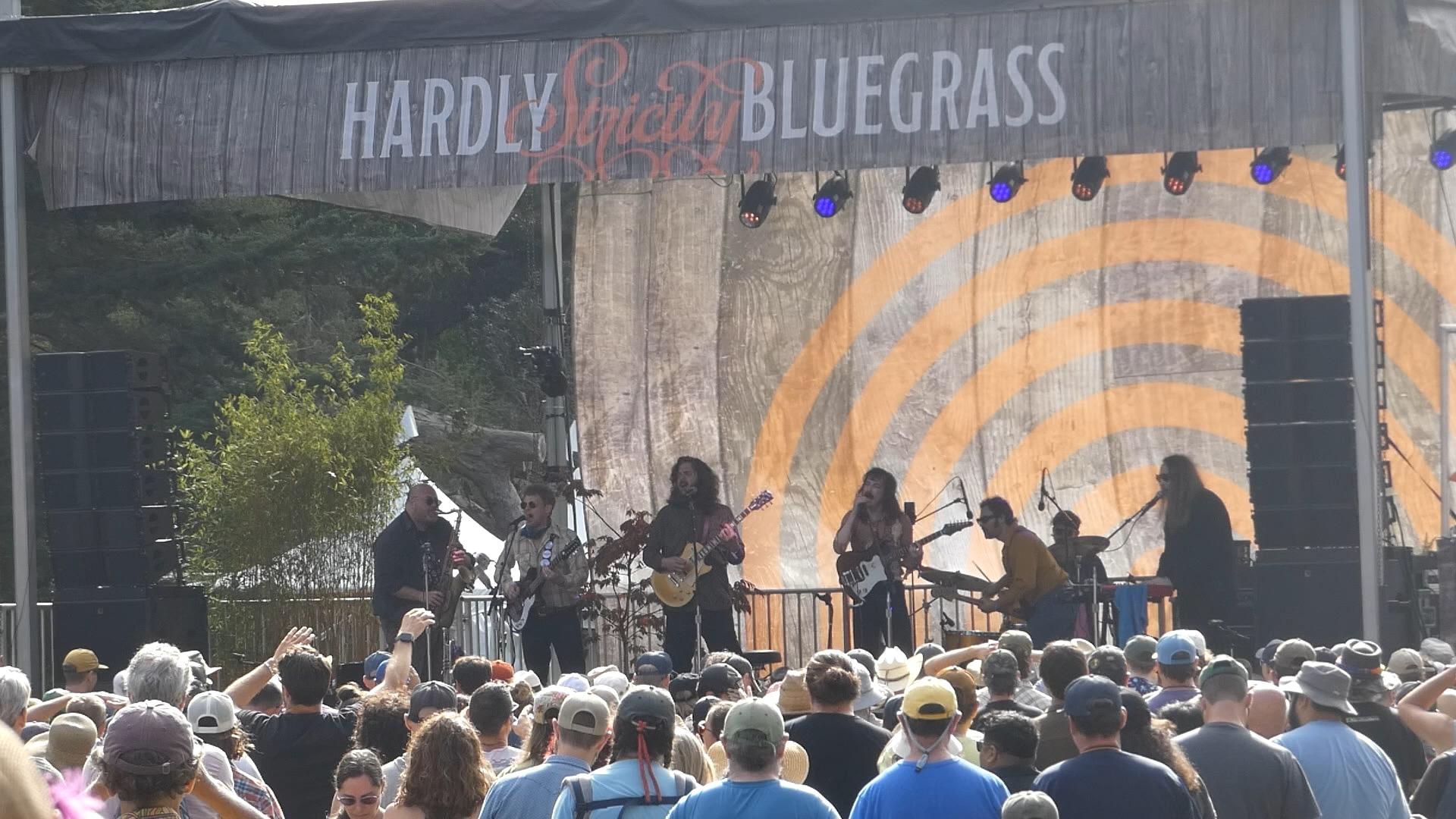
- Evolfo in 2025 at HSB

Background information
- Origin: U.S.A
- Genres: Psychedelic rock
- Years active: 2011–present
- Labels: Royal Potato Family; Food of Love
- Members: Benjamin Adams; Matthew Gibbs; Ronnie Lanzilotta; Dave Palazola; Kai Sorensen; Rafferty Swink; Jared Yee
- Website: evolfo.com

Evolfo is a psychedelic rock band based out of Brooklyn, NY. Evolfo is a 7-piece band. The band has been referred to by critics as a "psych rock septet".

In 2017, Evolfo released their debut album Last of the Acid Cowboys. The band's second album: Site Out Of Mind was released on June 18, 2021, on Royal Potato Family Records. In April 2026, Evolfo released an EP titled, Of Love, via the Food Of Love record label. A music video for “Restless Seed" the first single from Of Love was released in February 2026. Of Love received positive reviews from outlets, with Occult Magazine calling it an "ever-shifting daydream."

== Discography ==
=== Studio albums ===
- 2017 - Last of the Acid Cowboys
- 2021 - Site Out of Mind
- 2026 - Of Love

== Touring ==
In 2021, Evolfo played with Levitation Room. In July 2024, Evolfo played at the venue/roller-rink Xanadu. In August 2025, Evolfo played at the Bug Jar in Rochester, New York.
