= Marco Benevento =

American musician, songwriter and producer (born 1977)

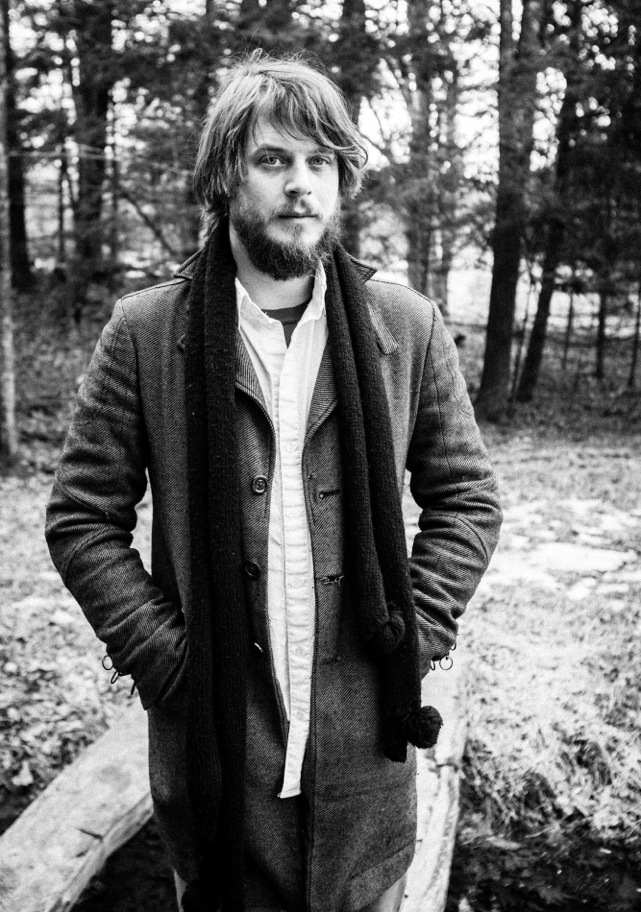
- Benevento in Saugerties, New York in 2012

Background information
- Born: Marco Vincent Benevento; July 22, 1977 (age 49); Livingston, New Jersey, U.S.
- Genres: Rock; experimental rock; psychedelic rock; experimental music; indie pop; jazz
- Occupations: Musician; singer; composer; music producer
- Instruments: Piano; Hammond organ; Wurlitzer electric piano; Optigan
- Labels: Royal Potato Family; Ropeadope; Hyena
- Website: marcobenevento.com

Marco Benevento (born July 22, 1977) is an American pianist, songwriter, multi-instrumentalist, and record producer, who has been a fixture of the New York experimental music rock and jazz scene since 1999. He is the founder and recording engineer of Fred Short, a recording studio in Upstate New York, and a member of the rock groups Benevento/Russo Duo and Joe Russo's Almost Dead, both of which feature his regular musical collaborator Joe Russo.

== Early life ==
Benevento was born in Livingston, New Jersey, United States, in 1977. He began playing piano at age seven. In his early teens Benevento was drawn to his four-track recorder, synthesizers and making home recordings. Benevento attended Ramapo High School and performed with various rock and experimental bands in Northern New Jersey and New York City. He graduated from Ramapo High in 1995 and Berklee College of Music in 1999.

== Career ==
Benevento has been a regular on the New York City contemporary, experimental jazz scene with his involvement in the Jazz Farmers (1999-2001), the Benevento Russo Duo (2002–present) and his own band (2006–present). Benevento has studied under and played alongside other keyboardists including Joanne Brackeen, Kenny Werner, John Medeski and Brad Mehldau. He has recorded and collaborated with musicians such as Matt Chamberlain, John McEntire, A. C. Newman, Rich Robinson, Stuart D. Bogie, Annakalmia Traver, Andrew Barr, Billy Martin, George Porter, Joe Russo, Mike Gordon, Trey Anastasio, and Phil Lesh.The keyboardist currently resides in the Woodstock, New York, area with his wife and two daughters.

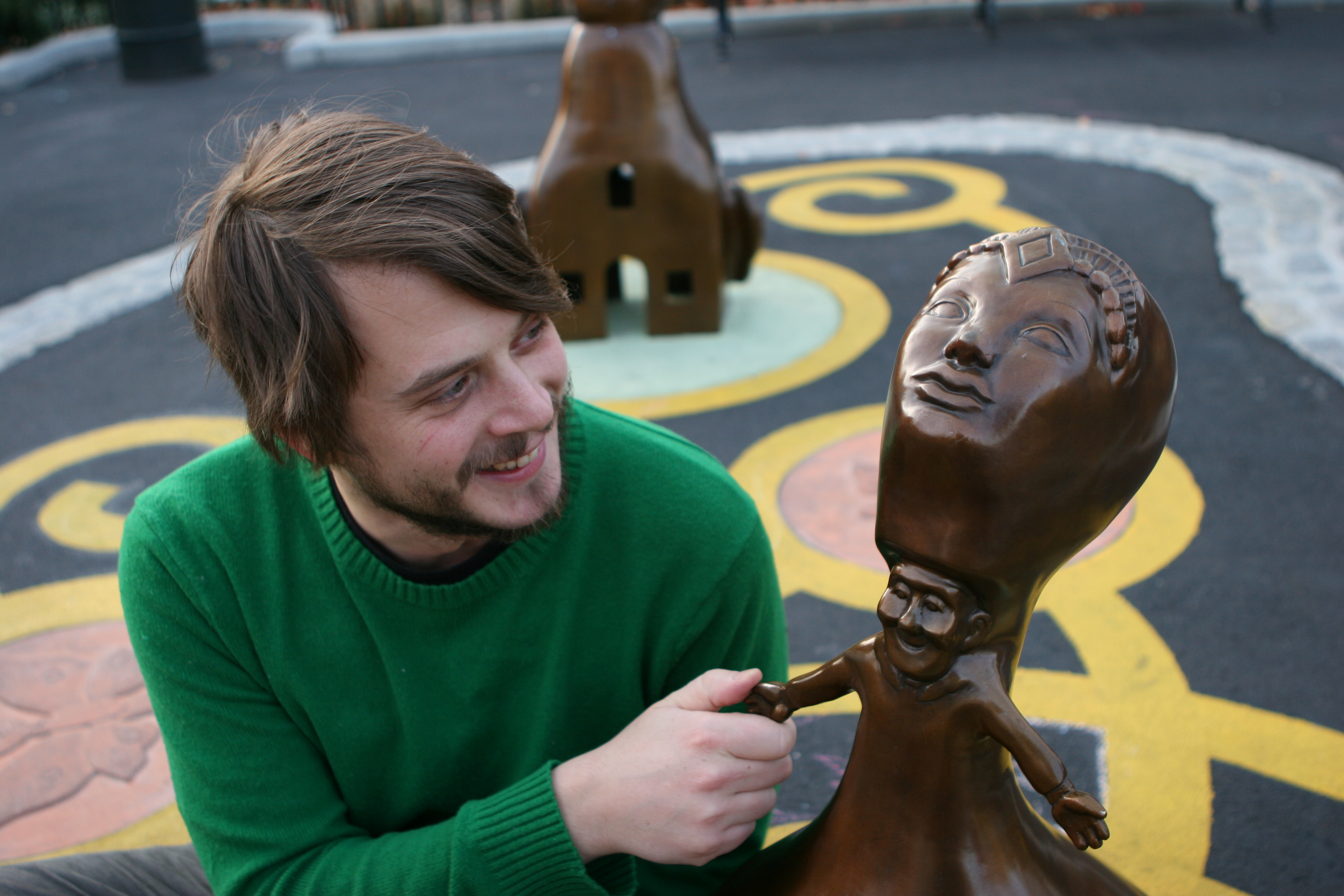
Benevento in Prospect Park, Brooklyn, 2008

Benevento's first studio album as a pianist, Invisible Baby, released in 2008, was nominated for Independent Music Awards Jazz Album of the year. Me Not Me, his second release, is a mix of original songs and covers such as "Heartbeats" (The Knife) and "Golden (My Morning Jacket). Benevento's third album, Between the Needles and Nightfall, was released in 2010 and his fourth album, Tigerface, was released in 2012. Tigerface features singer Annakalmia Traver of the band Rubblebucket and drummer John McEntire of Tortoise. Throughout all of his recordings Benevento plays an acoustic piano that is amplified by using pickups and effected with various effect pedals. He also makes use of circuit bent toys, drum machines and other synthesizers. Performances with his band include SXSW, Celebrate Brooklyn!, Carnegie Hall, the New Orleans Jazz & Heritage Festival, the Pickathon Music Festival, and the Newport Jazz Festival.

Benevento toured with Ween bassist Dave Dreiwitz and drummer Andrew Borger from 2012 to 2016. In 2016, Karina Rykman took over on bass for Dave Dreiwitz who had started touring again with Ween. In 2017 David Butler took over on drums when Andrew started playing with KD Lang and Pink Martini.

== The Royal Potato Family ==
In 2009 Benevento began his own record label with manager Kevin Calabro called The Royal Potato Family. Artists on the label include: Garage A Trois, Billy Martin, Tom Hamilton's American Babies, Holly Bowling, Lukas Nelson, Neal Casal, WOLF! Featuring Scott Metzger, Stanton Moore, Reed Mathis, Leslie Mendelson, The Jacob Fred Jazz Odyssey, Surprise Me Mr Davis, Yellowbirds, Superhuman Happiness, Nathan Moore, and Wil Blades.

== Benevento Russo Duo ==
Benevento is one half of the Benevento Russo Duo, an instrumental indie rock, experimental Hammond organ, Wurlitzer electric piano and drum duo that he formed with drummer Joe Russo in 2001. The band makes use of samplers, loops, circuit bent toys, guitars as well as glockenspiels to augment their sound. The Benevento Russo Duo have performed at events like Lollapalooza, Austin City Limits, Fuji Rock Festival, Bonnaroo, Wakarusa, High Sierra Music Festival and have drawn reviews at publications ranging from Rolling Stone to Pitchfork Media.

== Equipment ==
A fan of circuit bending, Benevento uses modified electronic toys to compose music. When playing with his band Marco amplifies the piano with guitar pickups and other effects. He has toured and performed with a modified acoustic piano, toy piano, Yamaha CP60, speak & Spell, glockenspiel, Rhythm Ace Drum Machine, Wurlitzer and Rheem Organ. Benevento's equipment includes a Casio sampling keyboard, effects pedals, a Hammond organ (with bass pedalboard) and a Wurlitzer electric piano.

== Related bands ==
Benevento is a member of Garage A Trois along with Stanton Moore, Skerik and Mike Dillon.

Benevento is a member of Joe Russo's Almost Dead, a Grateful Dead tribute band composed of Benevento, Joe Russo (drums), Dave Dreiwitz (bass), Tom Hamilton (guitar), and Scott Metzger (guitar).

In 2006, Benevento was featured in Bobby Previte's Coalition of the Willing US and European tour.

In July 2006, Benevento toured with Trey Anastasio, Mike Gordon and Joe Russo.

Benevento is also a member of the band Bustle In Your Hedgerow, a band that reinterprets the music of Led Zeppelin.

In 2006, Benevento recorded an improvisational 32 minute song for Zach Hill's Astrological Straits.

== Discography ==
=== Marco Benevento ===
- Live at Tonic (2007, Ropeadope)
- Invisible Baby (2008, Hyena Records)
- Me Not Me (2009, Royal Potato Family)
- Between the Needles and Nightfall (2010, Royal Potato Family)
- "Escape Horse"/"Fireworks" (7-inch single, 2011, Royal Potato Family)
- TigerFace (2012, Royal Potato Family)
- Swift (2014, Royal Potato Family)
- The Story of Fred Short (2016, Royal Potato Family)
- Woodstock Sessions (2017, Royal Potato Family)
- Let It Slide (2019, Royal Potato Family)
- Glera (2026, Big Crown Records)

=== Benevento/Russo Duo ===
- Marco Benevento and Joe Russo (2002)
- Darts (2003)
- Best Reason to Buy the Sun (2005) Ropeadope
- Live from Bonnaroo 2005 (featuring Mike Gordon) (July 18, 2006, recorded live in 2005)
- Play Pause Stop (2006) Reincarnate/Butter Problems

=== Garage A Trois ===
- Power Patriot (2009) Royal Potato Family
- Always Be Happy, But Stay Evil (2011) Royal Potato Family

=== Videography ===
- April in New York (2007) Bobby Previte DVD, independent
