= Joe Russo (musician) =

American drummer (born 1976)

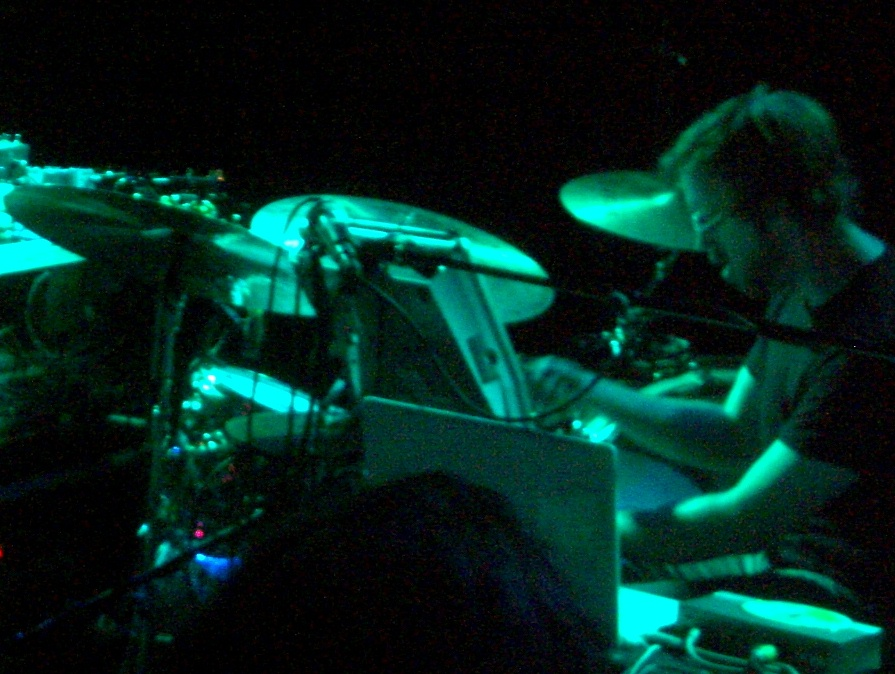
- Russo performing in Madison, Wisconsin in 2006

Background information
- Born: December 18, 1976 (age 49)
- Origin: Brooklyn, New York, United States
- Genres: Indie rock, jazz rock
- Occupations: Musician, composer
- Instruments: Drums, percussion, guitar, keyboards, bass
- Years active: 2000–present
- Labels: Butter Problems, Rope-A-Dope
- Website: JoeRussosAlmostDead.com

Joe Russo (born December 18, 1976) is an American drummer and half of the Benevento/Russo Duo. He has toured, performed and recorded with a number of other bands, including Cass McCombs, A Big Yes and a Small No, Fat Mama, Robert Walter's 20th Congress, Bustle In Your Hedgerow, Younger Brother, Shpongle, Tom Hamilton's American Babies, the Trey Anastasio/ Mike Gordon duo, the Gene Ween Band, and Furthur (featuring Phil Lesh and Bob Weir of the Grateful Dead). He also plays with the Shpongle Live Band. In 2013 he formed a Grateful Dead tribute band called Joe Russo's Almost Dead.

== Musical career ==
His Roland SPD-S sampler is often used for electronic drum samples, which play an important role in many of The Duo's compositions, such as "Welcome Red", "Becky", and "My Pet Goat". Two songs appearing on Play Pause Stop, "Memphis" and "Powder", were written by Russo and feature his guitar playing.

Russo has twice won the New Groove award at the Jammys, in 2000 and 2005. In mid 2006 he was the drummer in a collaboration with Trey Anastasio, Mike Gordon, and Marco Benevento (sometimes referred to as GRAB or Mike & the Italians).

During late 2008, Russo traveled to London to record an album with the band Younger Brother.

In December 2008, Russo joined Ween front man Gene Ween and fellow Bustle In Your Hedgerow band mates Scott Metzger and Dave Dreiwitz for a short east coast tour with an outfit called the Gene Ween Band. On this tour, Russo played his "house kit," which included a rare 30-inch bass drum purchased off of eBay.

In late 2009, Russo joined Bob Weir, Phil Lesh, Jay Lane, Jeff Chimenti and John Kadlecik (from Dark Star Orchestra) to form the band Furthur. Jay Lane left Furthur in March 2010 to rejoin Primus, and Russo continued to tour with the band as their sole drummer until they disbanded in November 2014.

In 2013, Joe Russo formed a band called Joe Russo's Almost Dead with Ween bassist Dave Dreiwitz, Marco Benevento on keyboards and Scott Metzger and Tom Hamilton on vocals and guitars. Joe Russo's Almost Dead interpret the music of the Grateful Dead. The project was originally conceived for the Freaks Ball, an annual party hosted by the NYC-Freaks music community.

Russo has recorded multiple albums with Craig Finn of the Hold Steady.

In 2021 Russo formed a trio with keyboard player John Medeski and Dave Harrington, and in 2023 formed a trio with Medeski and guitarist Marc Ribot.

== Discography ==
=== Solo ===
- "phér•bŏney" (2019)

=== American Babies ===
- Debut Album (2007)
- Flawed Logic (2010)
- Knives and Teeth (2013)

=== Fat Mama ===
- Mamatus (2000)
- Loadstar - Live at Theater '99 (2000)

=== Benevento/Russo Duo ===
- Debut Album (2002)
- Darts (2003)
- Best Reason to Buy the Sun (2005)
- Live at Bonnaroo 2005 (2005)
- Play Pause Stop (2006)
