= Scott Metzger =

American guitarist

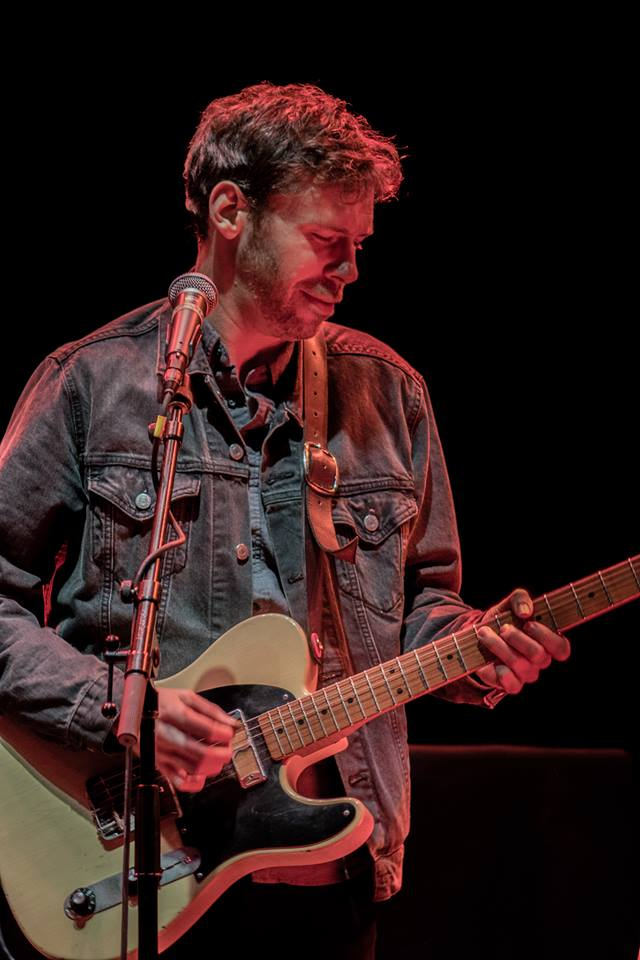
- Metzger in 2016

Background information
- Born: October 12, 1977 (age 48)
- Origin: Trenton, New Jersey, U.S.
- Genres: Psychedelic rock, Country rock, Jazz rock, Surf rock
- Occupation(s): Musician, composer
- Instrument(s): Guitar, Pedal steel guitar, Bass guitar, Vocals
- Website: www.scottmetzger.com

Scott Metzger (born October 12, 1977) is an American guitarist. His work touches on many styles including psychedelic rock, soul, country, jazz, and surf rock. His collaborations with other artists include Phil Lesh, Billy Martin, John Scofield, Branford Marsalis, John Medeski, Nels Cline, Joe Russo, John Mayer, Oteil Burbridge, Warren Haynes, Shooter Jennings, LaLa Brooks of The Crystals, Trixie Whitley, Nicole Atkins, Anders Osborne, Dean Ween, Russ Lawton, Ray Paczkowski, Mark Rechler's Circus Mind, Circles Around the Sun, the Stanton Moore trio, and Umphrey's McGee. Metzger is a full-time member of Joe Russo's Almost Dead since its inception in 2013; he also continues to play with other artists.

== Biography ==
Metzger was born in Trenton, New Jersey, and began playing guitar in his teens. He was raised in Lambertville, New Jersey, and attended the prestigious jazz program at William Paterson University.

He has performed at music festivals worldwide, including the Montreux Jazz Festival, Newport Jazz Festival, Newport Folk Festival, the New Orleans Jazz & Heritage Festival, Bonaroo, as well as many of the most famous & historic venues in the world, including Carnegie Hall, The Fillmore in San Francisco, Ancienne Belgique (Brussels, Belgium), The Blue Note (New York), Ryman Auditorium, Red Rocks Amphitheatre, Fox Theatre Oakland, Lincoln Center, and the Capitol Theatre.
