= Dave Dreiwitz =

American musician (born 1966)

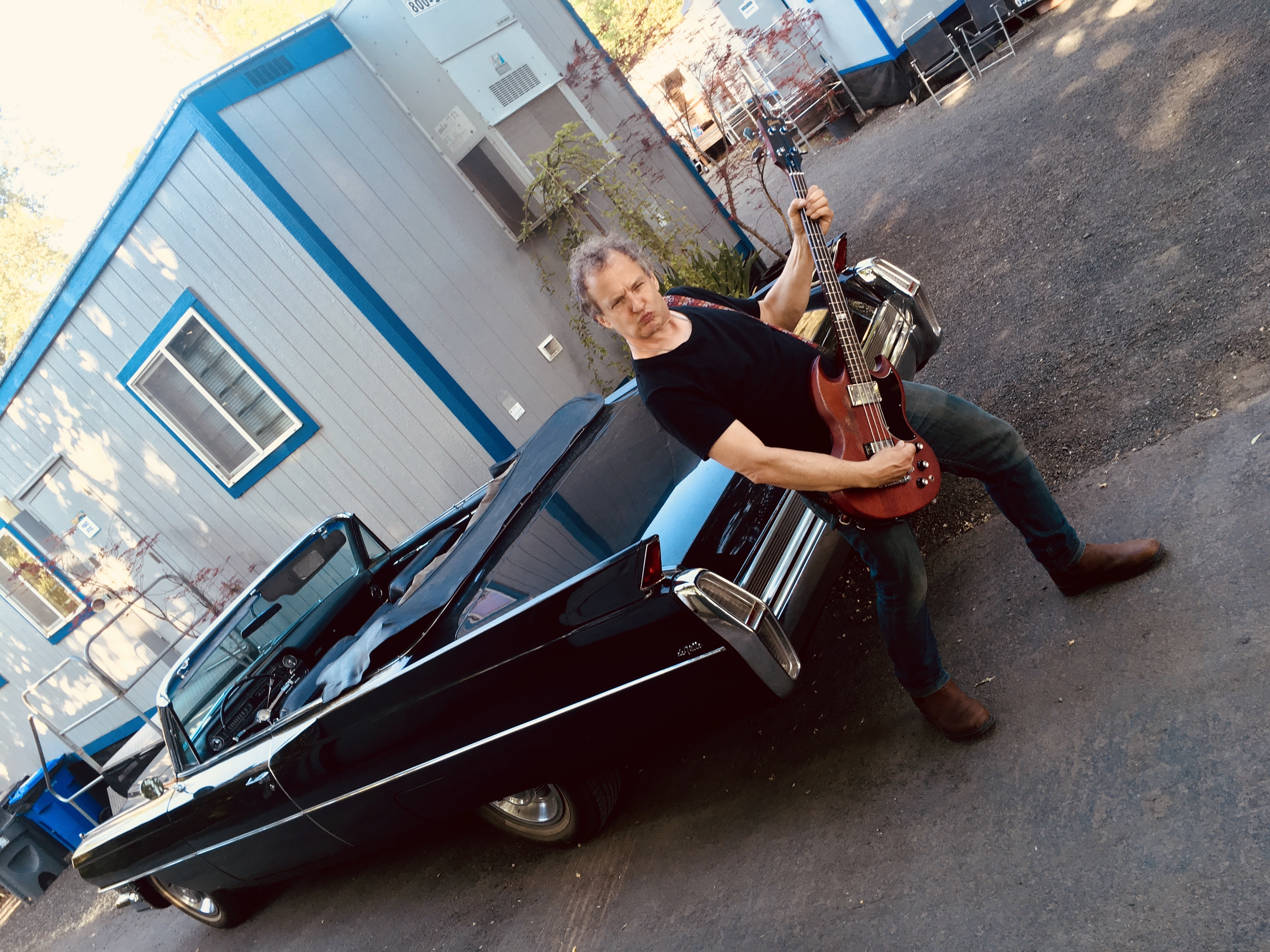
- Dreiwitz in 2019

Background information
- Born: January 2, 1966 (age 60); New York City
- Genres: Alternative rock; experimental rock; neo-psychedelia; hard rock; lo-fi; jazz
- Occupation: Musician
- Instruments: Bass guitar; double bass; vocals; trumpet; percussion; tuba
- Years active: 1985–present
- Label: Chocodog Records

Dave Dreiwitz (born January 2, 1966) is an American musician and multi-instrumentalist. He is best known as the bassist for the bands Ween and Joe Russo's Almost Dead.

== Biography ==
Dave Dreiwitz was born on January 2, 1966, in New York City, New York to traditional jazz musician parents, Richard and Barbara Dreiwitz. His father plays trombone and his mother plays tuba. In 1983, at the age of seventeen, after a short time on trumpet in Mod Fun, Dreiwitz joined the Hoboken, New Jersey–based psychedelic rock band Tiny Lights, his first professional band out of high school. In 1986, while attending Rutgers University in New Brunswick, New Jersey, he met fellow schoolmate and drummer Scott Byrne and through a love of similar music, they started the rock band Instant Death in 1991. Instant Death dissolved with the passing of Byrne in 2005.

In 1997, Dreiwitz joined Ween.

Dreiwitz is also a member of Joe Russo's Almost Dead, The Dean Ween Group and the Led Zeppelin instrumental tribute band, Bustle in Your Hedgerow. He occasionally plays bass with Chris Harford and the Band of Changes, Old Rugged Sauce as well as in his own drum and bass duo, Crescent Moon, which features Dreiwitz on bass and vocals alongside various guest drummers. Crescent Moon drummers have included Claude Coleman of Ween, Tomato from the Sound of Urchin, Eric Slick of Dr. Dog and Joe Russo of Furthur.

Dreiwitz has also performed with the Moistboyz, The Marco Benevento Trio, The Gene Ween Band, Andrew Weiss, Mark Mulcahy, Russell Batiste, Billy Martin, Johnny Vidacovich, Lunar Bear Ensemble with John Lunar Richey, John Kruth, Peter Stampfel of The Holy Modal Rounders, Fishermen's Stew, Brook Benton, Hal Willner, Sam Shepard, John S. Hall, King Missile (Dog Fly Religion), Jack Petruzzelli, Greg Di Gesu, Robert Musso Trio, Clem Snide, Joan Osborne and Sparklehorse.

Dreiwitz has played bass every year in the core band for The Complete Last Waltz annual rock concert performance since the inaugural show in 2012.

== Equipment ==
- Fender Precision Bass
- Bass 1980 Rickenbacker 4001
- Gibson EB-3
- Rig Gallien-Krueger 800RB head, Acoustic 2x15 cabinet
- Ampeg SVT, Ampeg 8x10 cabinet

== Sources ==
- Dave Dreiwitz : On Taking It To The Stage – Jimmy Leslie, Bass Player Magazine January 1, 2010
- Bustle In Your Hedgerow review November 29, 2008
