= Lost Frequencies discography =

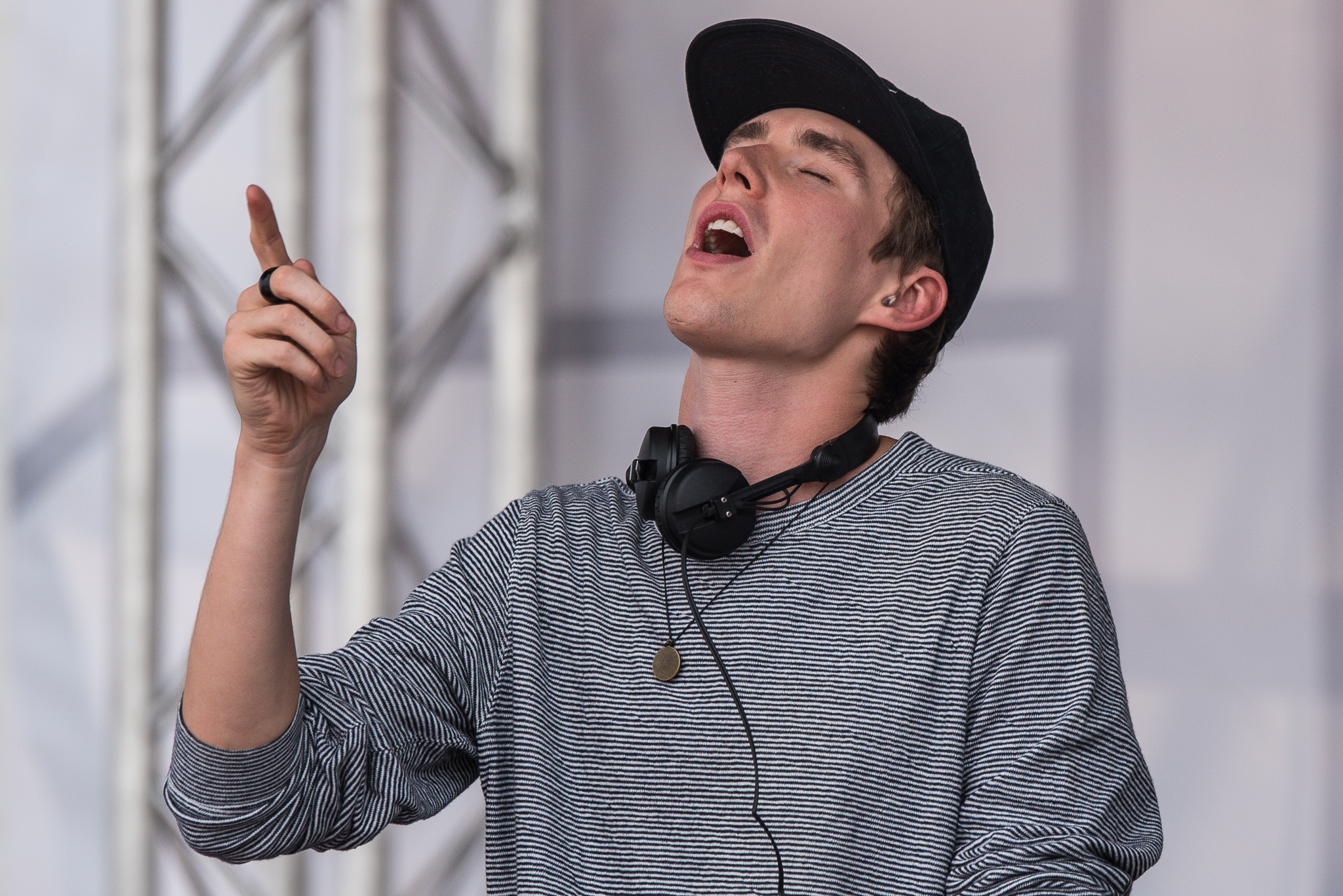
- Lost Frequencies at 2016 Open Beatz
- Studio albums: 3
- EPs: 2
- Singles: 26
- Remixes: 15

This is the discography of Belgian DJ Lost Frequencies.

== Studio albums ==
Title	Details	Peak chart positions				Certifications
Title	Details	BEL	FRA	NL	SWI	Certifications
Less Is More	Released: 21 October 2016; Label: Armada; Format: Digital download, CD	3	108	40	48	SNEP: Gold
Alive and Feeling Fine	Released: 4 October 2019; Label: Found Frequencies; Format: Digital download, streaming	6	—	51	52	
All Stand Together	Released: 10 November 2023; Label: Found Frequencies; Format: CD, digital download, streaming	26	114	67	29	
"—" denotes a recording that did not chart or was not released in that territory.

== Extended plays ==
Title	Details
Feelings	Released: 12 June 2014; Label: Ground Digital; Format: Digital download
Cup of Beats	Released: 31 July 2020; Label: Found Frequencies; Format: Digital download

== Singles ==
=== As lead artist ===
Title	Year	Peak chart positions										Certifications	Album
Title	Year	BEL	AUS	AUT	FRA	GER	ITA	NLD	SPA	SWI	UK	Certifications	Album
"Are You with Me"	2014	1	1	1	4	1	13	3	5	1	1	BRMA: 5× Platinum; ARIA: 2× Platinum; BPI: 3× Platinum; BVMI: Diamond; FIMI: 4× Platinum; NVPI: Platinum; PROMUSICAE: 3× Platinum	Less Is More
"Reality" (featuring Janieck Devy)	2015	1	35	1	2	1	8	5	2	2	29	BRMA: 4× Platinum; ARIA: Gold; BPI: Gold; BVMI: 3× Gold; FIMI: 4× Platinum; NVPI: 4× Platinum; PROMUSICAE: 2× Platinum	Less Is More
"Beautiful Life" (featuring Sandro Cavazza)	2016	1	—	51	39	50	94	65	35	—	—	BRMA: 2× Platinum; BVMI: Gold; NVPI: Platinum; SNEP: Gold	Less Is More
"What Is Love"	2016	1	—	20	92	24	—	73	—	52	—	BRMA: 2× Platinum; BVMI: Gold	Less Is More
"All or Nothing" (featuring Axel Ehnström)	2017	9	—	—	—	—	—	—	—	—	—	BRMA: Platinum	Less Is More
"Here with You" (with Netsky)	2017	2	—	—	—	—	—	76	—	—	—	BRMA: 2× Platinum; NVPI: Gold	Less Is More
"Crazy" (with Zonderling)	2017	1	—	7	73	13	15	56	—	13	—	BRMA: 3× Platinum; BVMI: Platinum; FIMI: 2× Platinum; NVPI: Gold; PROMUSICAE: Gold; SNEP: Platinum	Alive and Feeling Fine
"Melody" (featuring James Blunt)	2018	7	—	19	—	26	48	—	—	8	—	BRMA: Platinum; BVMI: Gold; FIMI: Platinum	Alive and Feeling Fine
"Like I Love You" (featuring The NGHBRS)	2018	5	—	36	61	40	—	—	—	45	—	BRMA: Platinum; SNEP: Gold	Alive and Feeling Fine
"Recognise" (featuring Flynn)	2019	18	—	—	—	—	—	—	—	—	—	BRMA: Platinum	Alive and Feeling Fine
"Truth Never Lies" (featuring Aloe Blacc)	2019	35	—	—	—	—	—	—	—	—	—		Alive and Feeling Fine
"Sun Is Shining"	2019	5	—	—	—	—	—	—	—	—	—	BRMA: 2× Platinum	Alive and Feeling Fine
"Black & Blue" (with Mokita)	2019	53	—	—	—	—	—	—	—	—	—		Alive and Feeling Fine
"Sweet Dreams"	2020	—	—	—	—	—	—	—	—	—	—		Alive and Feeling Fine
"Beat of My Heart" (featuring Love Harder)	2020	—	—	—	—	—	—	—	—	—	—		Alive and Feeling Fine
"Love to Go" (with Zonderling featuring Kelvin Jones)	2020	6	—	52	—	58	—	25	—	56	—	BRMA: Platinum; BVMI: Gold; NVPI: Platinum	Cup of Beats
"One More Night" (featuring Easton Corbin)	2020	—	—	—	—	—	—	—	—	—	—		Cup of Beats
"Don't Leave Me Now" (with Mathieu Koss)	2020	11	—	—	—	—	—	42	—	—	—	BRMA: Platinum	Cup of Beats
"Rise"	2021	10	—	—	69	—	—	19	—	—	—	BRMA: 2× Platinum; FIMI: Gold; IFPI AUT: Gold; IFPI SWI: Platinum; SNEP: Platinum	Non-album single
"Where Are You Now" (with Calum Scott)	2021	4	5	3	18	5	38	10	85	2	3	BRMA: 3× Platinum; ARIA: 7× Platinum; BPI: 3× Platinum; BVMI: 2× Platinum; FIMI: 3× Platinum; IFPI AUT: 4× Platinum; IFPI SWI: 5× Platinum; PROMUSICAE: 2× Platinum; SNEP: Diamond	All Stand Together
"Questions" (with James Arthur)	2022	13	—	—	—	—	—	54	—	87	—	IFPI SWI: Gold	All Stand Together
"Back to You" (with Elley Duhé and X Ambassadors)	2022	10	—	42	—	32	—	3	—	32	—	BVMI: Gold; IFPI AUT: Platinum; IFPI SWI: Platinum; SNEP: Gold	All Stand Together
"The Feeling"	2023	11	—	7	—	45	—	23	—	23	—	BVMI: Gold; IFPI AUT: Platinum; IFPI SWI: Platinum; SNEP: Gold	All Stand Together
"Dive" (with Tom Gregory)	2023	20	—	—	—	—	—	— (Note: "Dive" did not enter the Dutch Single Top 100, but peaked at number 30 on the Single Tip chart.)	—	—	—		All Stand Together
"Head Down" (with Bastille)	2023	12	—	64	—	28	—	35	—	87	78	BRMA: Platinum	All Stand Together
"In My Bones" (with David Kushner)	2024	—	—	—	—	—	—	—	—	—	—	BRMA: Gold	Non-album singles
"Black Friday (Pretty Like the Sun)" (with Tom Odell)	2024	1	71	31	79	23	—	5	—	5	50	BRMA: 4× Platinum; ARIA: 2× Platinum; BPI: Silver; BVMI: Gold; PROMUSICAE: Gold; SNEP: Gold	Non-album singles
"Love Is the Only Thing" (with Clementine Douglas)	2024	35	—	—	—	—	—	—	—	—	—		Non-album singles
"Kick the Nation" (with Pickle)	2024	—	—	—	—	—	—	—	—	—	—		Non-album singles
"Love Is the Only Thing"	2025	—	—	—	—	—	—	— (Note: "Love Is the Only Thing" did not enter the Dutch Single Top 100, but peaked at number 28 on the Single Tip chart.)	—	—	—		Non-album singles
"Dance in the Sunlight" (with Bandit)	2025	—	—	—	—	—	—	—	—	—	—		Non-album singles
"Sweet Disposition (A Moment, A Love)" (with the Temper Trap)	2025	6	—	—	—	—	—	— (Note: "Sweet Disposition (A Moment, A Love)" did not enter the Dutch Single Top 100, but peaked at number two on the Single Tip chart.)	—	—	—		Non-album singles
"Summer Skies (Love to Cry)" (with Argy & Rhys from the Sticks)	2025	—	—	—	—	—	—	—	—	—	—		Non-album singles
"Listen to Me" (with Ciel. and Radio Cargo)	2026	—	—	—	—	—	—	—	—	—	—		Non-album singles
"So Much Beauty (Around Us)" (with Nathan Nicholson)	2026	13	—	—	—	—	—	— (Note: "So Much Beauty (Around Us)" did not enter the Dutch Single Top 100, but peaked at number 30 on the Single Tip chart.)	—	—	—		Non-album singles
"Live It All"	2026	20	—	—	—	—	—	— (Note: "Live It All" did not enter the Dutch Single Top 100, but peaked at number 15 on the Dutch Single Tip chart.)	—	—	—		Non-album singles
"Paraiso" (with Mari Froes)	2026	—	—	—	—	—	—	—	—	—	—		Non-album singles
"Don't Forget (About Me)"	2026	—	—	—	—	—	—	— (Note: "Don't Forget (About Me)" did not enter the Dutch Single Top 100, but peaked at number 27 on the Dutch Single Tip chart.)	—	—	—		Non-album singles
"Wait All Night" (with Gryffin and Michael Marcagi)	2026	—	—	—	—	—	—	—	—	—	—		Non-album singles
"—" denotes a single that did not chart or was not released in that territory.	2026												

=== As featured artist ===
Title	Year	Peak chart positions
Title	Year	BEL
"Eagle Eyes" (Felix Jaehn featuring Lost Frequencies and Linying)	2015	48

=== Promotional singles ===
Title	Year	Album
"Trouble" (featuring Lauren)	2014	Feelings
"No Trust" (featuring Lauren)	2014	Feelings
"Tell Me" (featuring Chesqua)	2014	Non-album single

== Remixes ==
Title	Year	Original artist(s)
"No Women No Cry" (Lost Frequencies Bootleg)	2014	Bob Marley
"In This World" (Lost Frequencies Bootleg)	2014	Moby
"Liberty City" (Lost Frequencies Remix)	2014	Krono
"All You Need" (Lost Frequencies Remix)	2015	Y.V.E 48
"Paris" (Lost Frequencies Remix)	2015	Antoine Malye
"The Hum" (Lost Frequencies Remix)	2015	Dimitri Vegas & Like Mike vs. Ummet Ozcan
"In And Out Of Love" (Lost Frequencies Remix)	2015	Armin van Buuren (featuring Sharon den Adel)
"Run" (Lost Frequencies Remix)	2015	Emma Bale
"Sleep / For The Weak" (Lost Frequencies Remix)	2015	Lea Rue
"Cold Water" (Lost Frequencies Remix)	2016	Major Lazer (featuring Justin Bieber and MØ)
"Hey Baby" (Lost Frequencies Remix)	2017	Dimitri Vegas & Like Mike and Diplo
"Alone" (Lost Frequencies Remix)	2017	Alan Walker
"Malibu" (Lost Frequencies Remix)	2017	Miley Cyrus
"Guinea Pig" (Lost Frequencies Remix)	2018	Girls in Hawaii
"Slow Burn" (Lost Frequencies Remix)	2019	Moksi (featuring Elayna Boynton)
"American Boy" (Lost Frequencies Remix)	2019	Estelle (featuring Kanye West)
"Summer Days" (Lost Frequencies Remix)	2019	Martin Garrix (featuring Macklemore and Patrick Stump)
"Ave Cesaria" (Lost Frequencies Remix)	2019	Stromae
"She Don't Dance" (Lost Frequencies Remix)	2020	Everyone You Know
"Worry About Me" (Lost Frequencies Remix)	2020	Ellie Goulding (featuring blackbear)
"Tequila" (Lost Frequencies Remix)	2020	Jax Jones, Martin Solveig and Raye
"Lay Your Head on Me" (Lost Frequencies Remix)	2020	Major Lazer (featuring Marcus Mumford)
"Be Someone" (Lost Frequencies Remix)	2020	Joachim Pastor (featuring Eke)
"Bloodstream" (Lost Frequencies Remix)	2021	twocolors
"Never Going Home" (Lost Frequencies Remix)	2021	Kungs
"Kesariya" (Lost Frequencies Remix)	2023	Pritam, Arijit Singh
"Eyes Closed" (Lost Frequencies Remix)	2023	Ed Sheeran
"Broken" (Lost Frequencies Cut)	2023	Isak Danielson
"Jour meilleur" (Lost Frequencies Edit)	2023	Orelsan
"Freestyler (Rock The Microphone)"	2024	Bomfunk MC's
"Sweet Disposition"	2025	Temper Trap
