= Narcotic (disambiguation) =

A narcotic is a chemical substance with psychoactive properties.

Narcotic(s) may also refer to:

== Music ==
- Narcotic, a 1997 album by Muslimgauze
- "Narcotic" (Liquido song), 1998
- "Narcotic" (YouNotUs, Janieck and Senex song), a 2019 remix of the Liquido song

== Other uses ==
- Narcotic (patience), or Perpetual Motion, a solitaire card game
- Narcotics (film), a 1932 German drama film directed by Kurt Gerron and Roger Le Bon
