= Michael Schulte discography =

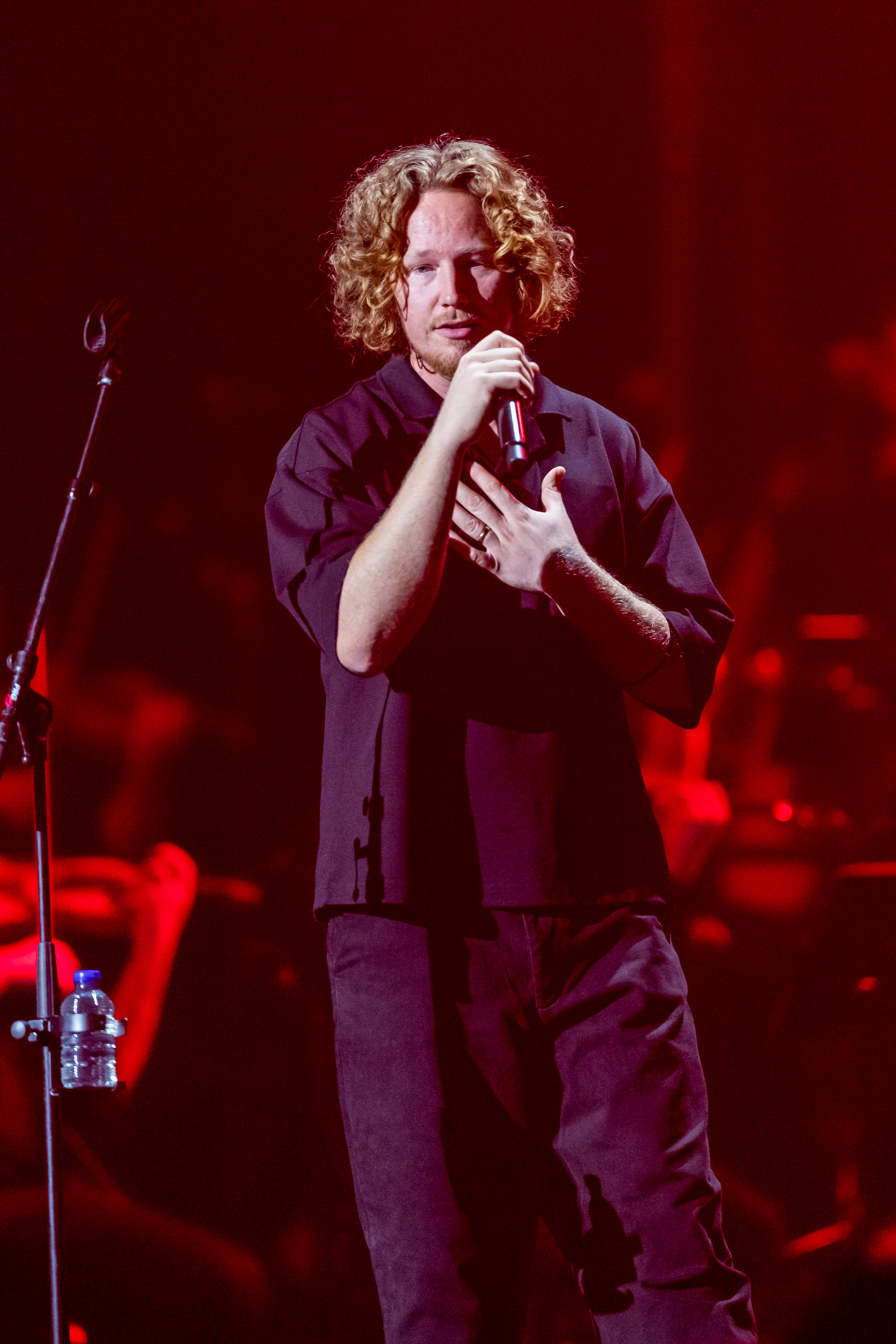
- Schulte in 2025.
- Studio albums: 9
- EPs: 2
- Live albums: 3
- Compilation albums: 1
- Singles: 15

The discography of German singer and songwriter Michael Schulte consists of eight studio albums and fifteen singles.

== Albums ==
=== Studio albums ===
List of studio albums
Title	Details	Peak chart positions
Title	Details	GER
All the Waves	Released: 18 March 2011; Label: viva la media; Formats: Digital download, CD	—
Berlin Sessions	Released: 9 December 2011; Label: Weinstein Media; Formats: Digital download, CD	—
Wide Awake	Released: 28 September 2012; Label: Very Us; Formats: Digital download, CD	54
My Christmas Classics	Released: 22 November 2013; Label: Very Us; Formats: Digital download, CD	—
The Arising	Released: 3 October 2014; Label: Very Us; Formats: Digital download, CD	81
Hold the Rhythm	Released: 28 April 2017; Label: Very Us; Formats: Digital download, CD	—
Highs & Lows	Released: 25 October 2019; Label: Very Us; Formats: Digital download, CD	23
Remember Me	Released: 29 September 2023; Label: Universal Music; Formats: Digital download, CD	9
Beautiful Reasons	Released: 17 April 2026; Label: Universal Music; Formats: Digital download, CD	10
"—" denotes a recording that did not chart or was not released in that territory.

=== Compilation albums ===
List of compilation albums
Title	Details	Peak chart positions
Title	Details	GER
Dreamer	Released: 4 May 2018; Label: Very Us; Formats: Digital download, CD	29

=== Live albums ===
List of live albums
Title	Details
Acoustic Cover, Vol. 1 (Live)	Released: 6 May 2011; Label: Weinstein Media; Formats: Digital download, CD
Acoustic Cover (Live), Vol. 2	Released: 15 July 2011; Label: Weinstein Media; Formats: Digital download, CD
Acoustic Cover (Live), Vol.3	Released: 27 July 2012; Label: Weinstein Media; Formats: Digital download, CD

== Extended plays ==
List of extended plays
Title	Details
Grow Old With Me	Released: 21 December 2012; Label: Very Us; Formats: Digital download, CD
Thoughts	Released: 16 May 2014; Label: Very Us; Formats: Digital download, CD

== Singles ==
=== As lead artist ===
List of singles as lead artist, with selected chart positions, showing year released and album name
Title	Year	Peak chart positions									Certifications	Album
Title	Year	GER	AUT	FRA	NLD	SCO	SPA	SWE	SWI	UK Down.	Certifications	Album
"Soul Traveler"	2010	—	—	—	—	—	—	—	—	—		All the Waves
"She"	2011	—	—	—	—	—	—	—	—	—		All the Waves
"Tears"	2011	—	—	—	—	—	—	—	—	—		Berlin Sessions
"Good Times"	2011	—	—	—	—	—	—	—	—	—		Berlin Sessions
"Carry Me Home"	2012	8	30	—	—	—	—	—	25	—		Non-album single
"Jump Before We Fall"	2012	—	—	—	—	—	—	—	—	—		Wide Awake
"You Said You'd Grow Old with Me"	2012	—	—	—	—	—	—	—	—	—		Wide Awake
"Rock and Scissors"	2014	—	—	—	—	—	—	—	—	—		The Arising
"The Maze"	2014	—	—	—	—	—	—	—	—	—		The Arising
"Money On Me" (with Møtions)	2016	—	—	—	—	—	—	—	—	—		Non-album single
"End of My Days"	2017	—	—	—	—	—	—	—	—	—		Hold the Rhythm
"Falling Apart"	2017	—	—	—	—	—	—	—	—	—	BPI: Silver	Hold the Rhythm
"You Let Me Walk Alone"	2018	3	23	105	83	36	74	32	27	43	BVMI: Gold	Dreamer
"Never Let You Down"	2018	—	—	—	—	—	—	—	—	—		Highs & Lows
"The Love You Left Behind"	2018	—	—	—	—	—	—	—	—	—		Highs & Lows
"Back to the Start"	2019	33	—	—	—	—	—	—	—	—	BVMI: Gold	Highs & Lows
"All I Need"	2019	—	—	—	—	—	—	—	—	—		Highs & Lows
"Keep Me Up"	2020	—	—	—	—	—	—	—	—	—		Highs & Lows (Special Edition)
"Wrong Direction" (with Ilse DeLange)	2020	—	—	—	—	—	—	—	—	—		Highs & Lows (Special Edition)
"For a Second"	2020	61	—	—	—	—	—	—	—	—	BVMI: Gold	Highs & Lows (Special Edition)
"Stay"	2021	— (Note: Did not appear on the official German Singles Chart, but peaked at number 10 on the German Airplay Chart.)	—	—	—	—	—	—	—	—		Remember Me
"Bye Bye Bye" (with YouNotUs)	2021	— (Note: Did not appear on the official German Singles Chart, but peaked at number 43 on the German Airplay Chart.)	—	—	—	—	—	—	—	—		Remember Me
"Here Goes Nothing"	2021	— (Note: Did not appear on the official German Singles Chart, but peaked at number 18 on the German Airplay Chart.)	—	—	—	—	—	—	—	—		Remember Me
"Remember Me"	2022	—	—	—	—	—	—	—	—	—		Remember Me
"With You"	2022	— (Note: Did not appear on the official German Singles Chart, but peaked at number 9 on the German Airplay Chart.)	—	—	—	—	—	—	—	—		Remember Me
"More to This Life" (with Max Giesinger)	2022	—	—	—	—	—	—	—	—	—		Remember Me
"Waterfall" (with R3hab)	2023	42	68	—	—	—	—	—	95	—	BVMI: Gold	Remember Me
"Dir gehört mein Herz" (with Giraffenaffen)	2023	—	—	—	—	—	—	—	—	—		Remember Me
"Better Me" (with R3hab)	2023	—	—	—	—	—	—	—	—	—		Non-album single
"If You Love Me" (with Norma Jean Martine)	2024	—	—	—	—	—	—	—	—	—		Beautiful Reasons
"Beautiful Reason"	2024	—	—	—	—	—	—	—	—	—		Beautiful Reasons
"Broken Sunshine"	2024	—	—	—	—	—	—	—	—	—		Beautiful Reasons
"Afterlife"	2025	—	—	—	—	—	—	—	—	—		Beautiful Reasons
"Half of My Heart" (with Ásdís)	2025	—	—	—	—	—	—	—	—	—		Beautiful Reasons
"5am"	2026	—	—	—	—	—	—	—	—	—		Beautiful Reasons
"Giants" (with Picture This)	2026	—	—	—	—	—	—	—	—	—		Beautiful Reasons
"Floating"	2026	—	—	—	—	—	—	—	—	—		Beautiful Reasons
"Cover You"	2026	—	—	—	—	—	—	—	—	—		Non-album single
"—" denotes a recording that did not chart or was not released in that territory.

=== As featured artist ===
List of singles as featured artist, with selected chart positions, showing year released and album name
Title	Year	Peak chart positions		Album
Title	Year	GER	AUT	Album
"Two Princes" (Fake Pictures featuring Michael Schulte)	2017	44	47	Non-album single

=== Promotional singles ===
List of promotional singles, showing year released and album name
Title	Year	Album
"Last Christmas"	2011	Non-album singles
"Video Games"	2012	Non-album singles
"Human"	2012	Non-album singles
"Creep"	2012	Non-album singles
"Ohne dich"	2012	Non-album singles
"Light My Fire"	2014	Non-album singles
