= Narcotic (Liquido song) =

1998 single by Liquido

Single by Liquido

from the album Liquido
- B-side: "Amie"
- Released: 31 August 1998
- Genre: Alternative rock
- Length: 4:42 (album version); 3:52 (radio edit)
- Label: Virgin
- Composer: Wolfgang Schrödl
- Lyricists: Tim Eiermann, Wolfgang Schrödl
- Producer: Olaf Opel

Liquido singles chronology
| "Narcotic" (1998) | "Clicklesley" (1999) |

"Narcotic" is a song by German rock band Liquido. It was released on 31 August 1998 as the band's debut single, and was included on their self-titled debut album.

Built around a prominent keyboard riff, the song was a commercial success throughout Western Europe, reaching the top ten in Austria, Belgium, Germany, the Netherlands and Switzerland.

Liquido is considered a one-hit wonder because none of the band's other songs saw much success.

== Background ==
The music to "Narcotic" was written by Liquido singer and keyboardist Wolfgang Schrödl, who wrote it in 1996 in his Heidelberg home when he was 21 years old. The song's opening keyboard riff came from a modified Roland D-70 synthesiser that Schrödl bought second-hand. Schrödl said "I was the only person who had these exact sounds, because that older guy created them." Schrödl wrote the song about a recent breakup.

The band sent the demo to various companies, but it was not accepted until Virgin Records in 1998 decided to release it as the band's debut single. Liquido wanted the song to sound as "Weezer-esque" as possible, because the band was Schrödl's biggest influence. It was produced by Olaf Opel. It took weeks before it finally entered the German singles chart at No. 87 and kept climbing.

Singer and guitarist Tim Eiermann, whose origins lied in grindcore, said "The harder stuff definitely wouldn't have been a hit. What I like to listen to in my private life is in the extreme range. I make that music out of passion and not to storm the charts."

The lyric "my cocaine" is frequently misheard as "Michael Caine".

== Commercial performance ==
"Narcotic" sold eight million copies worldwide. It peaked at number three in Germany and was a continental hit throughout Western Europe, also reaching number one in Austria.

However, the song was not a hit in the United Kingdom or the United States. The single was not even released in the United Kingdom, and Schrödl was told it was because the market for continental European music there is too small and because the song would not receive much radio play due to the drug references in the lyrics. In the United States, it received some rotation on K-Rock but not enough to make a Billboard chart.

== Legacy ==
Because none of Liquido's further singles gained much success, the band is considered a one-hit wonder. Schrödl said, "I was already horrified by the force with which the song was gaining more and more attention and a hype was starting to develop. I would have preferred to see the band develop healthily, with initial successes that could serve as a foundation. It was clear to me early on that 'Narcotic' would shape the entire perception of the band for an indefinite period of time and would be hard to top, and of course I wasn't very happy about it. I had to learn to understand that a hit can develop its own momentum and that as the creator you have to let go."

Musikexpress wrote that "Narcotic" was "the most successful German alternative rock song".

The song became the official anthem of the FC Girondins de Bordeaux football club in France and the UFC Eferding club in Austria.

In 2019, the song was covered by German DJ duo YouNotUs alongside Dutch songwriter Janieck, and Schrödl received credit under the alias Senex. It was also a hit throughout continental Europe.

== Charts ==
=== Weekly charts ===
Weekly chart performance for "Narcotic"
| Chart (1998–1999) | Peak position |
|---|---|
| Australia (ARIA) | 49 |
| Austria (Ö3 Austria Top 40) | 1 |
| Belgium (Ultratop 50 Flanders) | 5 |
| Belgium (Ultratop 50 Wallonia) | 28 |
| Europe (Eurochart Hot 100) | 6 |
| France (SNEP) | 21 |
| Germany (GfK) | 3 |
| Iceland (Íslenski Listinn Topp 40) | 10 |
| Italy (FIMI) | 6 |
| Netherlands (Dutch Top 40) | 4 |
| Netherlands (Single Top 100) | 7 |
| Norway (VG-lista) | 6 |
| Sweden (Sverigetopplistan) | 15 |
| Switzerland (Schweizer Hitparade) | 2 |

2026 weekly chart performance for "Narcotic"
| Chart (2026) | Peak position |
|---|---|
| Poland Airplay (OLiS) | 61 |

=== Yearly charts ===
1998 year-end chart performance for "Narcotic"
| Chart (1998) | Position |
|---|---|
| Germany (Media Control) | 83 |

1999 year-end chart performance for "Narcotic"
| Chart (1999) | Position |
|---|---|
| Austria (Ö3 Austria Top 40) | 5 |
| Belgium (Ultratop 50 Flanders) | 24 |
| Europe (Eurochart Hot 100) | 26 |
| Europe (Radio Top 50) | 86 |
| Europe Border Breakers (Music & Media) | 12 |
| Germany (Media Control) | 15 |
| Italy (Musica e dischi) | 40 |
| Netherlands (Dutch Top 40) | 45 |
| Netherlands (Single Top 100) | 49 |
| Switzerland (Schweizer Hitparade) | 11 |
