= Mathieu Koss =

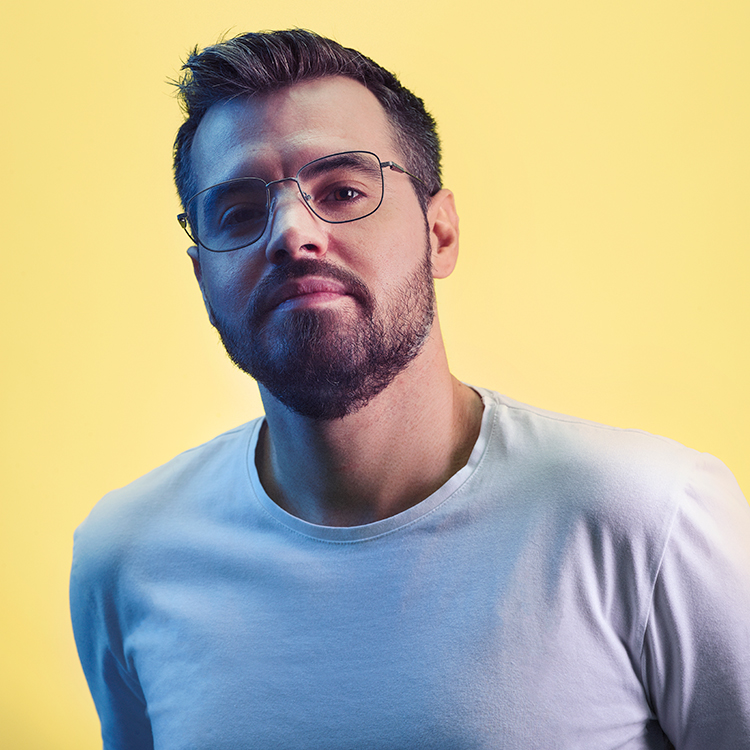

Background information
- Born: Mathieu Bordaraud; 27 May 1990 (age 35); Nancy, France
- Occupations: DJ; composer; producer
- Instruments: Guitar; piano; keyboards
- Website: mathieukoss.com

Mathieu Bordaraud (French pronunciation: [matjø bɔʁdaʁo]; born 27 May 1990), better known by his stage name Mathieu Koss, is a French DJ, record producer, and composer from Nancy.

In 2017, his cover of "Big Jet Plane" by Angus and Julia Stone with the Brazilian DJ Alok peaked at number one in Brazil and in the top 10 in multiple European countries. In 2020, his collaboration with Belgian DJ Lost Frequencies, "Don't Leave Me Now," will receive a Platinum record in Belgium.

== Biography ==
Mathieu was signed in 2016 to Spinnin' Records. His first single "Need Your Lovin", a cover from The Korgis, was released in the summer of 2016. In the same year, Bob Sinclar requested him to remix his song "Someone Who Needs Me". Koss's collaboration with Alok, "Big Jet Plane", peaked at 19th on the Belgian Wallonia Tip chart. A music video for the song was released. The single gained more than 200 million streams on Spotify, Apple Music and YouTube. "Big Jet Plane" was nominated in 2018 for Clip of the Year in the MTV Millennial Awards (MTV MIAW). In 2018, he released his first solo single with French singer Joan Alasta titled "Best Is Yet To Come". The single gained more than 5 million streams on Spotify.

March 2019 Mathieu release Never Growing Up with the American singer Aloe Blacc. The single will stay 45 weeks in the Airplay charts in Belgium.

In 2020 he release "HOME" a collaboration with the Bob Marley's son Ziggy Marley. The same year Mathieu receive a Platinum Record for "Don't Leave Me Now" his collaboration with the Belgian DJ Lost Frequencies.

== Discography ==
=== Charted singles ===
Title	Year	Peak chart positions					Album
Title	Year	FR	BEL (FL)	BEL (WA)	NED Single Top 100	NED Top 40	Album
"Big Jet Plane" (with Alok)	2017	—	—	19* (Ultratip)	—	—	Non-album singles
"Never Growing Up" (with Aloe Blacc)	2019	—	15	6* (Ultratip)	—	—	Non-album singles
"Home" (with Ziggy Marley)	2020	—	19* (Ultratip)	—	—	—	Non-album singles
"Don't Leave Me Now" (with Lost Frequencies)	2020	—	11	18	42	12	Cup of Beats

*Did not appear in the official Belgian Ultratop 50 charts, but rather in the bubbling under Ultratip charts.

=== Other singles ===
Title	Year
"Stars" (featuring Mingue)	2016
"Need Your Lovin'"	2016
"Campfire"	2016
"Best Is Yet to Come" (featuring Joan Alasta)	2018
"Believe in Love" (with LePrince)	2019
"Wicked Game, Pt.II"	2021
"Over Again"	2022
"Make It Up As We Go"	2022
"Place To Go"	2022
"Better Now"	2022
"Vertigo"	2022
"She's So Disco"	2023
"Flightless"	2023
"Queen For A Day"	2023
"Follow You"	2023

=== Remixes ===
- Bob Sinclar — "Someone Who Needs Me" [Yellow Productions/Spinnin' Remixes] (2016)
- Niels Geusebroek — "Wildfire" (Mathieu Koss Remix) [Spinnin' Prenium] (2016)
- Cazzette — "Static" (Mathieu Koss Remix) [Icon/PRMD] (2016)
- Destiny's Child — "Say My Name" (Mathieu Koss Remix) [Free/Ultra] (2016)
- Kygo featuring Ellie Goulding — "First Time" (Mathieu Koss Remix) [Free/Columbia] (2017)
- Klingande featuring Krishane — "Rebell Yell" (Mathieu Koss Remix) [Ultra] (2018)
- Celestal featuring Rachel Pearl and Grynn — "Old School Romance" (Mathieu Koss Remix) [MCA/Casablanca/Universal Music Group] (2018)
- Noa Kirel — "Please Don't Suck" (Mathieu Koss Remix) [Atlantic Records] (2021)
- Graham Candy — "Find My Way" (Mathieu Koss Edit) [V2 Records] (2022)

== Awards and nominations ==
Year	Award	Recipient	Category	Result
2018	MTV Millennial Awards	"Big Jet Plane"	Clip of the Year	Nominated

== Certifications ==
Year	Certification	Single	Country
2019	Diamond Record	Big Jet Plane	Brazil
2021	Platinum Record	Don't Leave Me Now (with Lost Frequencies)	Belgium
