= All Stand Together =

Studio album by Lost Frequencies
- Released: 10 November 2023
- Length: 35:42
- Label: Found Frequencies; Epic Amsterdam; Sony Belgium
- Producer: Lost Frequencies; Netsky

Lost Frequencies chronology
Alive and Feeling Fine (2019)	All Stand Together (2023)

Singles from All Stand Together
- 1. "Where Are You Now" Released: 30 July 2021; 2. "Questions" Released: 3 June 2022; 3. "Back to You" Released: 9 December 2022; 4. "The Feeling" Released: 9 June 2023; 5. "Dive" Released: 1 September 2023; 6. "Head Down" Released: 29 December 2023

All Stand Together is the third studio album by Belgian DJ and record producer Lost Frequencies. It was released on 11 November 2023 by Lost & Cie, Epic Amsterdam and Sony Music Belgium. It includes the singles "Where Are You Now" with Calum Scott, "Questions" with James Arthur, "Back to You" with Elley Duhé and X Ambassadors, "The Feeling", "Dive" with Tom Gregory, and "Head Down" with Bastille.

== Track listing ==
All the tracks are produced by Lost Frequencies, unless otherwise stated.

All Stand Together track listing
No.	Title	Writer(s)	Producer(s)	Length
1.	"No Limit" (with Zak Abel)	Felix de Laet; Zak Zilesnick		3:16
2.	"All Stand Together"	de Laet		3:15
3.	"Dive" (with Tom Gregory)	de Laet; Thomas Gregory		2:41
4.	"Head Down" (with Bastille)	de Laet; Dan Smith		2:53
5.	"Back to You" (with Elley Duhé and X Ambassadors)	de Laet; Elley Duhé; Sam Harris; Casey Harris; Adam Levin		2:36
6.	"The Feeling"	de Laet		2:34
7.	"Leave You in the Past" (with Netsky)	de Laet; Boris Daenen	Lost Frequencies; Netsky	2:44
8.	"Just Wanna Know" (with Declan J Donovan)	de Laet; Declan Donovan		3:08
9.	"Where Are You Now" (with Calum Scott)	de Laet; Calum Scott		2:29
10.	"Questions" (with James Arthur)	de Laet; James Arthur		2:57
11.	"Gone" (with Alexander Stewart)	de Laet; Alexander Stewart		3:21
12.	"Fall at Your Feet"	de Laet		6:36
Total length:				35:42

== Charts ==
=== Weekly charts ===
Weekly chart performance for All Stand Together
Chart (2023–2024)	Peak position
Belgian Albums (Ultratop Flanders)	26
Belgian Albums (Ultratop Wallonia)	41
Dutch Albums (Album Top 100)	67
French Albums (SNEP)	114
German Albums (Offizielle Top 100)	89
Lithuanian Albums (AGATA)	27
Polish Albums (ZPAV)	52
Swiss Albums (Schweizer Hitparade)	29
UK Dance Albums (Official Charts)	19

=== Year-end charts ===
Year-end chart performance for All Stand Together
Chart (2024)	Position
Australian Dance Albums (ARIA)	35
Belgian Albums (Ultratop Flanders)	127
Belgian Albums (Ultratop Wallonia)	190

== Certifications ==
Certifications and sales for All Stand Together
Region	Certification	Certified units/sales
Canada (Music Canada)	Gold	40,000^{‡}
Hungary (MAHASZ)	2× Platinum	8,000^{‡}
Poland (ZPAV)	2× Platinum	40,000^{‡}
^{‡} Sales+streaming figures based on certification alone.

== Release history ==
Release history for All Stand Together
Region	Release date	Format	Label
Various	11 November 2023	Digital download; CD	Found Frequencies; Epic Amsterdam; Sony Belgium
