= Rise (Lost Frequencies song) =

2021 single by Lost Frequencies

Single by Lost Frequencies
- Released: 19 March 2021
- Genre: Deep house; slap house
- Length: 3:13
- Label: Epic
- Songwriters: Felix de Laet; Jeffrey Goldford; Jonas D. Kröper; Martijn van Sonderen; Yoshi L.H. Breen
- Producer: Lost Frequencies

Lost Frequencies singles chronology
"Don't Leave Me Now" (2020)	"Rise" (2021)	"Where Are You Now" (2021)

Music video
- "Rise" on YouTube

"Rise" is a song by Belgian DJ Lost Frequencies. It was released on 19 March 2021 via Epic. The song was written and performed by Jeffrey Goldford (artist known GoldFord). Writers also include Jonas D. Kröper, Martijn van Sonderen, Yoshi L.H. Breen and Lost Frequencies, who also produced it.

== Composition ==
The song is written in the key of A♭ Minor, with a tempo of 122 beats per minute.

== Charts ==
=== Weekly charts ===
Weekly chart performance for "Rise"
Chart (2021–2022)	Peak position
Belgium (Ultratop 50 Flanders)	10
Belgium (Ultratop 50 Wallonia)	4
Czech Republic (Rádio – Top 100)	5
France (SNEP)	69
Hungary (Dance Top 40)	30
Hungary (Rádiós Top 40)	3
Hungary (Single Top 40)	15
Netherlands (Dutch Top 40)	6
Netherlands (Single Top 100)	19
US Hot Dance/Electronic Songs (Billboard)	36

=== Year-end charts ===
2021 year-end chart performance for "Rise"
Chart (2021)	Position
Belgium (Ultratop Flanders)	35
Belgium (Ultratop Wallonia)	23
Hungary (Rádiós Top 40)	62
Netherlands (Dutch Top 40)	31
Netherlands (Single Top 100)	66

2022 year-end chart performance for "Rise"
Chart (2022)	Position
Belgium (Ultratop 50 Flanders)	195
Hungary (Dance Top 40)	99

== Certifications ==
Certifications for "Rise"
Region	Certification	Certified units/sales
Austria (IFPI Austria)	Gold	15,000^{‡}
Belgium (BRMA)	2× Platinum	40,000^{‡}
France (SNEP)	Platinum	200,000^{‡}
Italy (FIMI)	Gold	50,000^{‡}
Switzerland (IFPI Switzerland)	Platinum	20,000^{‡}
^{‡} Sales+streaming figures based on certification alone.
