= Back to You (Lost Frequencies, Elley Duhé, and X Ambassadors song) =

2022 song by Lost Frequencies, Elley Duhé, and X Ambassadors

Single by Lost Frequencies, Elley Duhé, and X Ambassadors

from the album All Stand Together
- Released: 8 December 2022
- Genre: Deep House
- Length: 2:37
- Label: Epic
- Songwriter(s): Felix de Laet; Elley Duhé; Sam Harris; Casey Harris; Adam Levin; Nicklas Lif; Joacim Persson; Jonas Vesa
- Producer(s): Lost Frequencies

Lost Frequencies singles chronology
| "Questions" (2022) | "Back to You" (2022) | "The Feeling" (2023) |

Elley Duhé singles chronology
| "Don't Leave Me Lovely" (2022) | "Back to You" (2022) | "Money on the Dash" (2023) |

X Ambassadors singles chronology
| "Water" (2021) | "Back to You" (2022) | "Happy People" (2023) |

Music video
- "Back to You" on YouTube

"Back to You" is a song by Belgian DJ Lost Frequencies, American singer Elley Duhé, and American band X Ambassadors. It was released on 8 December 2022, through Epic Records. The song was released as the third single from Lost Frequencies' third studio album All Stand Together.

== Background and composition ==
"Back to You" was written by Felix de Laet, Elley Duhé, and X Ambassadors lead singer Sam Harris as well as Nicklas Lif, Joacim Persson, and Jonas Vesa. The song is an EDM song led by a piano with a guitar solo at the drops. The lyrics describe that all of life's paths a person led them to finding a loved one through a melody repeated through the verses and choruses.

== Music video ==
The video for "Back to You" was released 19 January, 2023 and was directed by Timo Ottevanger. The video features clips of Duhé and Harris of X Ambassadors singing and de Laet playing piano and guitar in a snowy forest, savannah, foggy rockside, and a waterfall in a grassy cavern.

== Track listing ==
- Digital download
1. "Back to You" – 2:37
- Deluxe Pack EP
1. "Back to You" (Afrohouse Deluxe Mix) – 3:26
2. "Back to You" (Dzeko Remix) – 2:35
3. "Back to You" (Tom & Collins Remix) – 2:53
4. "Back to You" (SUBSHIFT Remix) – 3:32
5. "Back to You" (Kasango Remix) – 6:25

== Personnel ==
Credits for "Back to You" adapted from Apple Music.

Musicians
- Elley Duhé – lead vocals
- Sam Harris – lead vocals
- Lost Frequencies – programming, piano, guitar
Production
- Lost Frequencies – production
- Sören von Malmborg – mixing

== Charts ==
Chart performance for "Back to You"
| Chart (2023) | Peak position |
|---|---|
| Austria (Ö3 Austria Top 40) | 42 |
| Belgium (Ultratop 50 Flanders) | 10 |
| Belgium (Ultratop 50 Wallonia) | 5 |
| Czech Republic (Rádio – Top 100) | 8 |
| Germany (GfK) | 32 |
| Netherlands (Dutch Top 40) | 3 |
| Netherlands (Single Top 100) | 25 |
| Romania (Romanian Radio Airplay) | 4 |
| Switzerland (Schweizer Hitparade) | 32 |
| US Hot Dance/Electronic Songs (Billboard) | 37 |

== Certifications ==
Certifications for "Back to You"
| Region | Certification | Certified units/sales |
|---|---|---|
| Austria (IFPI Austria) | Platinum | 30,000^{‡} |
| France (SNEP) | Gold | 100,000^{‡} |
| Germany (BVMI) | Gold | 300,000^{‡} |
| Hungary (MAHASZ) | 3× Platinum | 12,000^{‡} |
| Poland (ZPAV) | Platinum | 50,000^{‡} |
| Switzerland (IFPI Switzerland) | Platinum | 20,000^{‡} |
^{‡} Sales+streaming figures based on certification alone.
