= Kelvin Jones (singer) =

British-Zimbabwean singer-songwriter (born 1995)

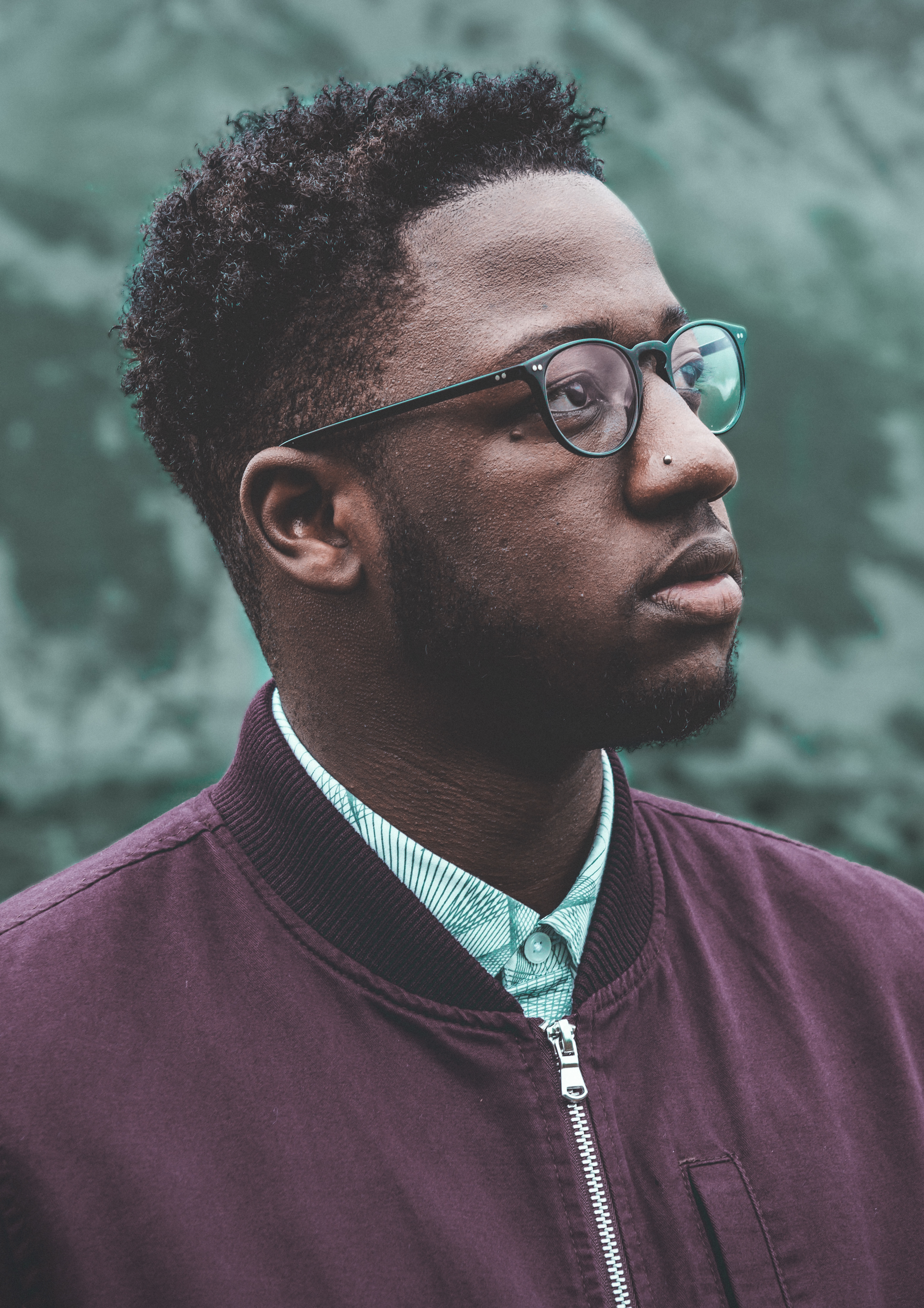
- Self-portrait photograph

Background information
- Also known as: Kelvin Jones
- Born: Tinashe Kelvin Mupani; 10 February 1995 (age 30)
- Origin: Chitungwiza, Zimbabwe
- Genres: Pop; pop rock
- Occupation: Singer-songwriter
- Instruments: Guitar; piano; vocals; bass
- Years active: 2015–present
- Labels: Four Music Sony Music

Kelvin Jones (born 10 February 1995) is a British-Zimbabwean singer-songwriter. Since 2016 he has lived in Germany.

== Background ==
His breakout single was "Call You Home" and became popular on Reddit after a friend posted it on the site. It was subsequently played on Good Morning America and led to Jones' signing by Sony under Four Music in Germany, Epic Records in England, and RCA in America. In 2015 he was the support tour for Mark Forster's Bauch und Kopf tour, and then followed that with a support tour of X Ambassadors in early 2016 and two months supporting James Morrison for his European tour Higher Than Here.

"Call You Home" has been used on ITV series Cold Feet. Kelvin is also featured in a 2017 Centurylink ad campaign which was shown during the Super Bowl.

== Discography ==
=== Albums ===
Title	Details	Peak positions	
Title	Details	GER	SWI
Stop the Moment	Released: 11 September 2015; Label: Four Music; Formats: CD, digital download	71	55
This Too Shall Last	Released: 6 May 2022; Label: Four Music; Formats: CD, digital download	60	96

=== Singles ===
Title	Year	Peak positions			Album
Title	Year	AUT	GER	SWI	Album
"Call You Home"	2015	47	61	—	Stop the Moment
"Closer"	2016	—	—	—	Stop the Moment
"Only Thing We Know" (with Alle Farben and YouNotUs)	2018	24	20	41	Sticker on My Suitcase
"Magnetic" (with Sara Hartman)	2018	—	—	—	Non-album singles
"Seventeen" (with YouNotUs)	2019	—	—	—	Non-album singles
"Love to Go" (with Lost Frequencies and Zonderling)	2020	52	58	56	Cup of Beats
"Downtown" (with R3hab)	2021	—	—	—	Non-album single
"Born to Break Your Heart"	2023	—	—	—	Non-album single
"—" denotes a recording that did not chart or was not released in that territory.
