= Sun Is Shining (Lost Frequencies song) =

2019 remix of a 2007 J.J. Grey song

"The Sun Is Shining Down"

Song by JJ Grey & Mofro

from the album Country Ghetto
- Released: 2007
- Recorded: 2007
- Genre: Soul
- Length: 5:58
- Songwriter: J.J.Grey

"Sun Is Shining"

Single by Lost Frequencies

from the album Alive and Feeling Fine
- Released: 9 August 2019
- Length: 3:09
- Label: Found Frequencies
- Songwriters: Felix de Laet; J.J. Grey
- Producer: Lost Frequencies

Lost Frequencies singles chronology
"Truth Never Lies" (2019)	"Sun Is Shining" (2019)	"Black & Blue" (2019)

Music video
- "Sun Is Shining" on YouTube

"The Sun Is Shining Down" is a song written by J.J.Grey of the musical formation JJ Grey & Mofro. It is included in their 2007 album Country Ghetto.

Lost Frequencies made an adaptation and remix changing the title slightly to "Sun Is Shining" and included it in his 2018 album Alive and Feeling Fine. "Sun Is Shining" was released on 9 August 2019 becoming a hit in Belgium, Felix de Laet's home country. Although not credited in the title, the song's featured vocals are by Vince Freeman. The song is a crossover between House music of a religious theme and lyrics.

== Credits ==
The lyrics are credited to J.J. Grey and the arrangement to Felix de Laet who uses the stage name Lost Frequencies in his productions. The 2018 album also includes a Deluxe Remix of the song.

According to Felix de Laet, the title of his album Alive and Feeling Fine actually came to him thanks to the refrain lyrics "I'm alive and I'm feeling fine" in the song "Sun Is Shining".

== "The Sun Is Shining Down" ==
The original "The Sun Is Shining Down" written by JJ Grey of the musical formation JJ Grey & Mofro appears in their 2007 album Country Ghetto. Although never a single, it was very popular in the formation's live performances. The Lost Frequencies' adaptation keeps the lyrics original in their entirety.

=== Context ===
The songwriter J.J. Grey says that in writing the lyrics of "The Sun Is Shining Down", he was inspired by a perceived conversation between his grandfather and grandmother when she was taking him to the hospital as he had fallen seriously ill. It's Grey's perception of "the last words they had together" as he explains at the beginning of a live video release of the song. She asks him: "How many more days can you hold out / How much longer can you wait?" and he answers: "Glory, Glory - Hallelujah / The sun is shining, shining down / Glory, Glory - Hallelujah / I'm alive and I'm feeling, feeling fine" Grey says in the excerpt from the video that his grandfather never made it to the hospital and died on the way.

=== Credits ===
The credits for the original track:

- J.J. Grey – vocals, keys, electric guitar, acoustic guitar
- Daryl Hance – guitar, slide guitar
- Adam Scone – organ, organ bass
- George Sluppick – drums

== Music video ==
The Christian-themed song, along with an official video, was shot in a rural church setting. The music video was directed by Jesse Vulink, edited by Danny Leysner and produced by Erik van der Zwan stars Harvey Gibbs a Dutch DJ also known as DJ Mr. Gibbs, who is a DJ, singer-songwriter, and member of the group Rock 'n Rolla. The video shows Gibbs singing in front of a church congregation, later joined by a gospel choir as those in church get inspired and start to clap with the song. At the end, he leads the crowd outside the church where they continue singing and dancing in the countryside.

== Release and chart performance ==
The song was released as a single on 9 August 2019, the sixth single from the album after "Crazy", "Melody", "Like I Love You" in 2018 and "Recognise" featuring Flynn and "Truth Never Lies" featuring American singer Aloe Blacc in 2019. After "Sun Is Shining", a 7th and final single was released from the album being "Black & Blue".

The remix became a charting hit in Belgium, reaching number 5 on the Belgian Flemish Singles Chart and number 24 on the Belgian Wallonia chart.

== Charts ==
=== Weekly charts ===
Weekly chart performance for "Sun Is Shining"
Chart (2019–2020)	Peak position
Belgium (Ultratop 50 Flanders)	5
Belgium (Ultratop 50 Wallonia)	24

=== Year-end charts ===
Year-end chart performance for "Sun Is Shining"
Chart (2020)	Position
Belgium (Ultratop Flanders)	99

== Certifications ==
Certifications for "Sun Is Shining"
Region	Certification	Certified units/sales
Belgium (BRMA)	2× Platinum	40,000^{‡}
^{‡} Sales+streaming figures based on certification alone.
