= Here with You =

Single by Lost Frequencies and Netsky

from the album Less Is More
- Released: 30 June 2017
- Recorded: 2016
- Length: 2:39
- Label: CNR Music Belgium; Armada Music; Ultra Music
- Songwriter(s): Tobias Kuhn; Boris Daenen; Felix De Laet; Amy Yon
- Producer(s): Boris Daenen; Felix De Laet

Lost Frequencies singles chronology
"All or Nothing" (2017)	"Here with You" (2017)	"Crazy" (2017)

Netsky singles chronology
"Who Knows" (2016)	"Here with You" (2017)	"Téquila Limonada" (2018)

Music video
- "Here with You" on YouTube

"Here with You" is a song performed by Belgian DJ and record producer Lost Frequencies and Belgian drum and bass producer and musician Netsky, with uncredited vocals by Amy Yon. The song was released as a digital download on 30 June 2017 and was written by Tobias Kuhn, Boris Daenen, Felix De Laet and Amy Yon.

== Music video ==
A music video to accompany the release of "Here with You" was first released onto YouTube on 18 July 2017 at a total length of two minutes and thirty-nine seconds.

== Track listing ==
Digital download
No.	Title	Length
1.	"Here with You"	2:39
2.	"Here with You" (Extended Mix)	3:33

== Charts ==
=== Weekly charts ===
Chart (2017–2018)	Peak position
Belgium (Ultratop 50 Flanders)	2
Belgium (Ultratop 50 Wallonia)	47
Netherlands (Single Top 100)	76
Romania (Airplay 100)	27

=== Year-end charts ===
Chart (2017)	Position
Belgium (Ultratop Flanders)	42

== Certifications ==
Region	Certification	Certified units/sales
Belgium (BEA)	2× Platinum	40,000^{‡}
Netherlands (NVPI)	Gold	20,000^{‡}
New Zealand (RMNZ)	Gold	15,000^{‡}
^{‡} Sales+streaming figures based on certification alone.

== Release history ==
Region	Date	Format	Label
Belgium	30 June 2017	Digital download	CNR Music Belgium
