= Remember Me (Michael Schulte album) =

Studio album by Michael Schulte
- Released: 29 September 2023
- Length: 40:33
- Label: Polydor
- Producer: Abaz; Tobias Bartsch; Michael Burek; Lennart Damann; Michael Geldreich; Alexander Hauer; Florian Lipphardt; Leon Milla; Ricardo Muñoz; Patrick Pyke Salmy; Pascal "Kalli" Reinhardt; Truva; X-Plosive; YouNotUs

Michael Schulte chronology
Highs & Lows (2019)	Remember Me (2023)	Beautiful Reasons (2026)

Remember Me is the seventh studio album by German singer Michael Schulte. It was released by Polydor Records on 29 September 2023.

== Critical reception ==
Professional ratings
Review scores
Source	Rating
laut.de	3/5 stars

Antenne Brandenburg critic Tina Knop wrote that with Remember Me "Schulte masters the delicate play of quiet tones and large gestures, of power and fragility, of pop catchiness with rock and dance energy." Kai Butterweck from laut.de rated the album three stars out of five and summed the album as "Sheeran pop from Northern Germany." He found that "Schulte ensures that the boundaries between melodic pop music and danceable club sounds are blurred. Thanks to his clear voice and almost accent-free English, nothing here seems forced or fake. Remember Me may not be a case for the music history books. But it's very possible that many of today's chart pop fans will still remember [it] in five or ten years." Stern magazine found that with Remember Me "Schulte doesn't necessarily create a musical monument for himself, but it is at least modern, varied and easy to listen to."

== Chart performance ==
Remember Me debuted at number nine on the German Albums Chart in the week of 6 October 2023. It marked Schulte's first top ten album as well as his highest-charting album yet.

== Track listing ==
Remember Me track listing
No.	Title	Writer(s)	Producer(s)	Length
1.	"With You"	Michael Schulte; Patrick Pyke Salmy; Timothy "Hight" Deal; Ricardo Muñoz	Salmy; Muñoz; Leon Milla	3:11
2.	"Here Goes Nothing"	Schulte; Salmy; Deal; Muñoz	Salmy; Muñoz; Milla	3:11
3.	"Stay"	Schulte; Thomas Kessler; Imran Abbas; Tom Gregory; Molly Irvine	X-Plosive; Abaz	2:52
4.	"Remember Me"	Schulte; Michael Geldreich; Deal	Geldreich	3:36
5.	"More to This Life" (with Max Giesinger)	Schulte; Giesinger; Joe Walter; Steffen Graef	Truva; Graef	3:20
6.	"Hey" (with Montez)	Schulte; Salmy; Muñoz; Emma Rosen; Luca Manuel Montesions Gargallo; Nico Witter	Salmy	2:59
7.	"Are You In, Are You Out"	Schulte; Alexander Hauer; Koda	Hauer	3:59
8.	"Better Me" (with R3hab)	Schulte; Michael Burek; Fadil El Ghoul; Deal	Burek	2:46
9.	"Watterfall" (with R3hab)	Schulte; Deal; El Ghoul; Giesinger; Graef; Walter; Pascal "Kalli" Reinhardt	Reinhardt	2:19
10.	"Bye Bye Bye" (with YouNotUs)	Schulte; Tobias Bogdon; Gregor Sahm; Matthias Wagemann; Bernard Sioeng Dinata; Ignacio Larraza Fornes; Yury Revich	Sahm; Bogdon	3:43
11.	"Slowly"	Schulte; Salmy; Muñoz; Christoph James Brenner	Salmy; Muñoz; Milla	2:39
12.	"One More Day"	Schulte; Salmy; Muñoz; Brenner	Salmy; Muñoz; Milla	2:43
13.	"Lovers on the Run" (with Amistat)	Schulte; Jan Paul Prasil; Josef Paul Prasil; Tobias Bartsch; Philipp Dimitri Karajev; Walter	Lennart Damann; Bartsch	2:36
14.	"Nothing Left of Me"	Schulte; Florian Lipphardt; Deal	Lipphardt	2:52
Total length:				40:33

Notes

- ^{^[a]} signifies a co-producer

== Charts ==
Chart performance for Remember Me
Chart (2023)	Peak position
German Albums (Offizielle Top 100)	9

== Release history ==
Release history and formats for Remember Me
Region	Date	Formats	Label	Ref.
Various	29 September 2023	CD; digital download; streaming	Polydor Records	
