= Love to Go =

2020 single by Lost Frequencies, Zonderling and Kelvin Jones

Single by Lost Frequencies, Zonderling and Kelvin Jones

from the EP Cup of Beats
- Released: 17 April 2020
- Genre: Tropical house • dance-pop
- Length: 2:49
- Label: Found Frequencies; Armada Music
- Songwriters: Martijn van Sonderen; Felix De Laet; Daniel Flamm; Patrick Salmy; Jaap de Vries; Ricardo Muñoz; Molly Irvine; Tinashe Kelvin Mupani
- Producers: Zonderling; Lost Frequencies

Lost Frequencies singles chronology
"Beat of My Heart" (2020)	"Love to Go" (2020)	"One More Night" (2020)

"Love to Go" is a song by Belgian DJ Lost Frequencies, Dutch Electronic music trio Zonderling & British–Zimbabwean singer-songwriter Kelvin Jones. It was released as a single through Found Frequencies and Armada Music on 17 April 2020. The song was written by Martijn van Sonderen, Felix De Laet, Daniel Flamm, Patrick Salmy, Jaap de Vries, Ricardo Muñoz, Molly Irvine and Tinashe Kelvin Mupani.

== Charts ==
=== Weekly charts ===
Chart (2020)	Peak position
Austria (Ö3 Austria Top 40)	52
Belgium (Ultratop 50 Flanders)	6
Belgium (Ultratop 50 Wallonia)	19
Germany (GfK)	58
Hungary (Rádiós Top 40)	16
Netherlands (Dutch Top 40)	7
Netherlands (Single Top 100)	25
Poland Airplay (ZPAV)	4
Romania (Airplay 100)	26
Slovakia Airplay (ČNS IFPI)	13
Slovenia (SloTop50)	13
Switzerland (Schweizer Hitparade)	56
US Dance Airplay (Billboard)	21

=== Year-end charts ===
Chart (2020)	Position
Belgium (Ultratop Flanders)	24
Belgium (Ultratop Wallonia)	77
Netherlands (Dutch Top 40)	14
Netherlands (Single Top 100)	89
Poland (ZPAV)	41

== Certifications ==
Region	Certification	Certified units/sales
Belgium (BRMA)	Platinum	20,000^{‡}
Germany (BVMI)	Gold	200,000^{‡}
Netherlands (NVPI)	Platinum	80,000^{‡}
^{‡} Sales+streaming figures based on certification alone.

== Release history ==
Region	Date	Format	Label
Various	17 April 2020	Digital download; streaming	Found Frequencies; Armada Music
