= Don't Leave Me Now (Lost Frequencies and Mathieu Koss song) =

Single by Lost Frequencies and Mathieu Koss

from the EP Cup of Beats
- Released: 31 July 2020
- Length: 3:15
- Label: Found Frequencies
- Songwriter(s): Felix de Laet; Joren van der Voort; Christon Kloosterboer; Dalton Dielh; Mathieu Bordaraud; Peter Hanna
- Producer(s): Lost Frequencies; Mathieu Koss

Lost Frequencies singles chronology
"One More Night" (2020)	"Don't Leave Me Now" (2020)	"Rise" (2021)

Mathieu Koss singles chronology
"Home" (2020)	"Don't Leave Me Now" (2020)

Music video
- "Don't Leave Me Now" on YouTube

"Don't Leave Me Now" is a song by Belgian DJ Lost Frequencies and French DJ Mathieu Koss. It was released on 31 July 2020 on Found Frequencies. The song was written by Felix De Laet, Joren van der Voort, Christon Kloosterboer, Dalton Dielh, Mathieu Bordaraud and Peter Hanna, and produced by De Laet and Bordaraud.

== Composition ==
The song is written in the key of F♯ Minor, with a tempo of 125 beats per minute.

== Track listing ==
Digital download
No.	Title	Length
1.	"Don't Leave Me Now"	3:15

Digital download – remixes
No.	Title	Length
1.	"Don't Leave Me Now" (Brooks remix)	3:03
2.	"Don't Leave Me Now" (Mark Sixma remix)	2:58
3.	"Don't Leave Me Now" (Scorz remix)	3:58
4.	"Don't Leave Me Now" (Deluxe remix)	4:50
5.	"Don't Leave Me Now" (Acoustic)	3:03
6.	"Don't Leave Me Now" (Original)	3:15

== Charts ==
=== Weekly charts ===
Weekly chart performance for "Don't Leave Me Now"
Chart (2020–2021)	Peak position
Belgium (Ultratop 50 Flanders)	11
Belgium (Ultratop 50 Wallonia)	18
Hungary (Rádiós Top 40)	29
Netherlands (Dutch Top 40)	12
Netherlands (Single Top 100)	42

=== Year-end charts ===
2020 year-end chart performance for "Don't Leave Me Now"
Chart (2020)	Position
Belgium (Ultratop Flanders)	91
Netherlands (Dutch Top 40)	69

2021 year-end chart performance for "Don't Leave Me Now"
Chart (2021)	Position
Belgium (Ultratop Flanders)	75
Netherlands (Airplay Top 50)	41

== Certifications ==
Certifications for "Don't Leave Me Now"
Region	Certification	Certified units/sales
Belgium (BEA)	Platinum	40,000^{‡}
^{‡} Sales+streaming figures based on certification alone.
