= Crazy (Lost Frequencies and Zonderling song) =

Single by Lost Frequencies and Zonderling

from the album Alive and Feeling Fine
- Released: 24 November 2017
- Genre: Alternative house, pop
- Length: 2:33
- Label: Armada Music
- Songwriters: Felix de Laet; Allan Eshuijs; David Benjamin; Gia Koka; Jaap de Vries; Martijn van Sonderen
- Producers: Lost Frequencies; Zonderling

Lost Frequencies singles chronology
"Here with You" (2017)	"Crazy" (2017)	"Melody" (2018)

Music video
- "Crazy" on YouTube

"Crazy" is a song recorded by Belgian DJ Lost Frequencies and Dutch duo Zonderling. It was released on 24 November 2017 through Armada Music. This song is a remix of "Call Me Crazy" by David Benjamin, who also provides vocals for this song.

== Background ==
Lost Frequencies released the single to celebrate his one billion streams all over the world, and the opening of his own label, Found Frequencies. He also explained the genesis of the song:

I met Zonderling last year, and immediately fell in love with the quality productions and vibes of this amazing duo. They first made a remix of my cover single "What is love" and we started working on a new original track together because I really wanted to merge our two sounds together! That's when we created "Crazy" together, a perfect combination of our two worlds! I'm so happy to share this track with the world, and blown away by the amazing feedback!

— Lost Frequencies talking "Crazy" to Digital Journal,

== Charts ==
=== Weekly charts ===
Chart (2017–2018)	Peak position
Austria (Ö3 Austria Top 40)	7
Belgium (Ultratop 50 Flanders)	1
Belgium (Ultratop 50 Wallonia)	1
Belgium Dance (Ultratop Flanders)	1
Belgium Dance (Ultratop Wallonia)	1
Canada AC (Billboard)	35
Croatia (HRT)	44
Czech Republic Airplay (ČNS IFPI)	1
Czech Republic Singles Digital (ČNS IFPI)	88
France (SNEP)	73
Germany (GfK)	13
Hungary (Dance Top 40)	12
Hungary (Rádiós Top 40)	1
Hungary (Single Top 40)	8
Italy (FIMI)	15
Luxembourg Digital Song Sales (Billboard)	4
Netherlands (Dutch Top 40)	12
Netherlands (Single Top 100)	56
Netherlands Dance (Dance Top 30)	5
Poland Airplay (ZPAV)	1
Slovakia Airplay (ČNS IFPI)	1
Slovakia Singles Digital (ČNS IFPI)	69
Slovenia (SloTop50)	2
Sweden Heatseeker (Sverigetopplistan)	4
Switzerland (Schweizer Hitparade)	13
US Hot Dance/Electronic Songs (Billboard)	38

=== Year-end charts ===
Chart (2018)	Position
Austria (Ö3 Austria Top 40)	49
Belgium (Ultratop Flanders)	4
Belgium (Ultratop Wallonia)	13
Belgium Dance (Ultratop Flanders)	2
Belgium Dance (Ultratop Wallonia)	5
France (SNEP)	182
Germany (Official German Charts)	42
Hungary (Dance Top 40)	51
Hungary (Rádiós Top 40)	2
Hungary (Single Top 40)	41
Italy (FIMI)	37
Netherlands (Dutch Top 40)	70
Netherlands Dance (Dance Top 30)	33
Poland (ZPAV)	9
Switzerland (Schweizer Hitparade)	47

== Certifications ==
Region	Certification	Certified units/sales
Belgium (BRMA)	3× Platinum	60,000^{‡}
Canada (Music Canada)	Gold	40,000^{‡}
France (SNEP)	Platinum	200,000^{‡}
Germany (BVMI)	Platinum	400,000^{‡}
Italy (FIMI)	2× Platinum	100,000^{‡}
Netherlands (NVPI)	Gold	20,000^{‡}
Spain (Promusicae)	Gold	30,000^{‡}
^{‡} Sales+streaming figures based on certification alone.
