= Where Are You Now (Lost Frequencies song) =

Single by Lost Frequencies and Calum Scott

from the album All Stand Together
- Released: 30 July 2021
- Genre: Tropical house
- Length: 2:28
- Label: Epic
- Songwriters: Felix de Laet; Dag Lundberg; Joacim Bo Persson; Michael Patrick Kelly; Sebastian Arman
- Producer: Lost Frequencies

Lost Frequencies singles chronology
"Rise" (2021)	"Where Are You Now" (2021)	"Questions" (2022)

Calum Scott singles chronology
"Biblical" (2021)	"Where Are You Now" (2021)	"Rise" (2021)

Music video
- "Where Are You Now" on YouTube

"Where Are You Now" is a song by Belgian DJ Lost Frequencies and English singer Calum Scott. It was released on 30 July 2021 via Epic. The song was written by Dag Lundberg, Joacim Bo Persson, Michael Patrick Kelly, Sebastian Arman and Lost Frequencies, who also produced it. It was nominated for Best International Song at the 2023 Brit Awards.

== Composition ==
The song is written in the key of F♯ minor, with a tempo of 121 beats per minute.

== Chart performance ==
Commercially, the song reached number one in Ireland, Poland, Hungary and Slovakia, as well as the top 10 in Australia, Austria, Belgium, Czech Republic, Denmark, Germany, Lithuania, Netherlands, Norway, Russia, Sweden, and Switzerland. It peaked at number three on the UK Singles Chart, becoming Lost Frequencies's highest-charting single since "Are You with Me" (2015). It stayed nineteen weeks at the number 1 spot in UK Dance Singles and Albums Charts. As of May 19, 2022, "Where Are You Now" has appeared on the German Dance Singles chart for a total of 38 weeks, including two separate stints at number one including seven weeks at the top spot in October and November 2021, before returning to the top spot in February 2022 where it has remained for fifteen weeks.

== Track listing ==
- Digital download and streaming
1. "Where Are You Now" – 2:28
- Digital download and streaming – Acoustic
1. "Where Are You Now" (Acoustic) – 2:42
- Digital download and streaming – Deluxe mix
1. "Where Are You Now" (Deluxe mix) – 4:14
- Digital download and streaming – Kungs remix
1. "Where Are You Now" (Kungs remix) – 3:12
- Digital download and streaming – Remix pack
1. "Where Are You Now" (Kungs remix) – 3:12
2. "Where Are You Now" (Deluxe mix) – 4:14

== Credits and personnel ==
Credits adapted from Tidal.

- Lost Frequencies – producer, associated performer
- Dag Lundberg – lyricist
- Felix de Laet – lyricist
- Joacim Bo Persson – lyricist
- Michael Patrick Kelly – lyricist
- Sebastian Arman – lyricist
- Calum Scott – associated performer, vocal
- Lorna Blackwood – vocal producer
- Andres Algaba - mixer

== Charts ==
=== Weekly charts ===
Weekly chart performance for "Where Are You Now"
Chart (2021–2022)	Peak position
Australia (ARIA)	5
Austria (Ö3 Austria Top 40)	3
Belgium (Ultratop 50 Flanders)	4
Belgium (Ultratop 50 Wallonia)	5
Canada Hot 100 (Billboard)	26
Canada AC (Billboard)	49
Canada CHR/Top 40 (Billboard)	37
Croatia International (HRT)	11
Czech Republic Airplay (ČNS IFPI)	2
Czech Republic Singles Digital (ČNS IFPI)	6
Denmark (Tracklisten)	6
Finland (Suomen virallinen lista)	19
France (SNEP)	18
Germany (GfK)	5
Germany Dance (Official German Charts)	1
Global 200 (Billboard)	22
Greece International (IFPI)	6
Hungary (Rádiós Top 40)	6
Hungary (Single Top 40)	1
Hungary (Stream Top 40)	3
Iceland (Tónlistinn)	12
Ireland (IRMA)	1
Italy (FIMI)	38
Lebanon (OLT20)	4
Lithuania (AGATA)	3
Luxembourg (Billboard)	6
Netherlands (Dutch Top 40)	6
Netherlands (Single Top 100)	10
New Zealand (Recorded Music NZ)	12
Norway (VG-lista)	9
Poland Airplay (ZPAV)	1
Portugal (AFP)	16
Romania Airplay (Media Forest)	7
Russia Airplay (TopHit)	5
Slovakia Airplay (ČNS IFPI)	1
Slovakia Singles Digital (ČNS IFPI)	1
South Africa (TOSAC)	11
Spain (PROMUSICAE)	85
Sweden (Sverigetopplistan)	7
Switzerland (Schweizer Hitparade)	2
UK Singles (Official Charts)	3
UK Dance (Official Charts)	1
US Hot Dance/Electronic Songs (Billboard)	4
US Pop Airplay (Billboard)	35

=== Year-end charts ===
2021 year-end chart performance for "Where Are You Now"
Chart (2021)	Position
Austria (Ö3 Austria Top 40)	33
Belgium (Ultratop Flanders)	30
Belgium (Ultratop Wallonia)	21
Croatia (HRT)	94
Denmark (Tracklisten)	68
France (SNEP)	143
Germany (Official German Charts)	38
Hungary (Single Top 40)	35
Hungary (Stream Top 40)	45
Netherlands (Dutch Top 40)	23
Netherlands (Single Top 100)	35
Poland (Polish Airplay Top 100)	51
Sweden (Sverigetopplistan)	78
Switzerland (Schweizer Hitparade)	49
US Hot Dance/Electronic Songs (Billboard)	35

2022 year-end chart performance for "Where Are You Now"
Chart (2022)	Position
Australia (ARIA)	7
Austria (Ö3 Austria Top 40)	6
Belgium (Ultratop Flanders)	15
Belgium (Ultratop Wallonia)	11
Canada (Canadian Hot 100)	29
Denmark (Tracklisten)	13
France (SNEP)	41
Germany (Official German Charts)	7
Global 200 (Billboard)	24
Hungary (Dance Top 40)	100
Hungary (Rádiós Top 40)	31
Hungary (Single Top 40)	6
Hungary (Stream Top 40)	15
Italy (FIMI)	58
Lithuania (AGATA)	6
Netherlands (Single Top 100)	21
New Zealand (Recorded Music NZ)	22
Russia Airplay (TopHit)	80
Sweden (Sverigetopplistan)	11
Switzerland (Schweizer Hitparade)	5
UK Singles (OCC)	8
US Hot Dance/Electronic Songs (Billboard)	14

2023 year-end chart performance for "Where Are You Now"
Chart (2023)	Position
Austria (Ö3 Austria Top 40)	70
Romania Airplay (TopHit)	129
Switzerland (Schweizer Hitparade)	25

2024 year-end chart performance for "Where Are You Now"
Chart (2024)	Position
Australia Dance (ARIA)	13
Romania Airplay (TopHit)	199
Switzerland (Schweizer Hitparade)	60

2025 year-end chart performance for "Where Are You Now"
Chart (2025)	Position
Romania Airplay (TopHit)	184

== Certifications ==
Certifications for "Where Are You Now"
Region	Certification	Certified units/sales
Australia (ARIA)	7× Platinum	490,000^{‡}
Austria (IFPI Austria)	4× Platinum	120,000^{‡}
Belgium (BRMA)	3× Platinum	60,000^{‡}
Brazil (Pro-Música Brasil)	Diamond	160,000^{‡}
Canada (Music Canada)	5× Platinum	400,000^{‡}
Denmark (IFPI Danmark)	3× Platinum	270,000^{‡}
France (SNEP)	Diamond	333,333^{‡}
Germany (BVMI)	2× Platinum	800,000^{‡}
Hungary (MAHASZ)	12× Platinum	48,000^{‡}
Italy (FIMI)	3× Platinum	300,000^{‡}
Mexico (AMPROFON)	Gold	70,000^{‡}
New Zealand (RMNZ)	4× Platinum	120,000^{‡}
Poland (ZPAV)	4× Platinum	200,000^{‡}
Portugal (AFP)	4× Platinum	40,000^{‡}
Spain (Promusicae)	2× Platinum	120,000^{‡}
Switzerland (IFPI Switzerland)	5× Platinum	100,000^{‡}
United Kingdom (BPI)	3× Platinum	1,800,000^{‡}
United States (RIAA)	Gold	500,000^{‡}
Streaming
Greece (IFPI Greece)	3× Platinum	6,000,000^{†}
Sweden (GLF)	3× Platinum	24,000,000^{†}
^{‡} Sales+streaming figures based on certification alone.^{†} Streaming-only figures based on certification alone.
