= Tom Gregory (singer) =

English singer

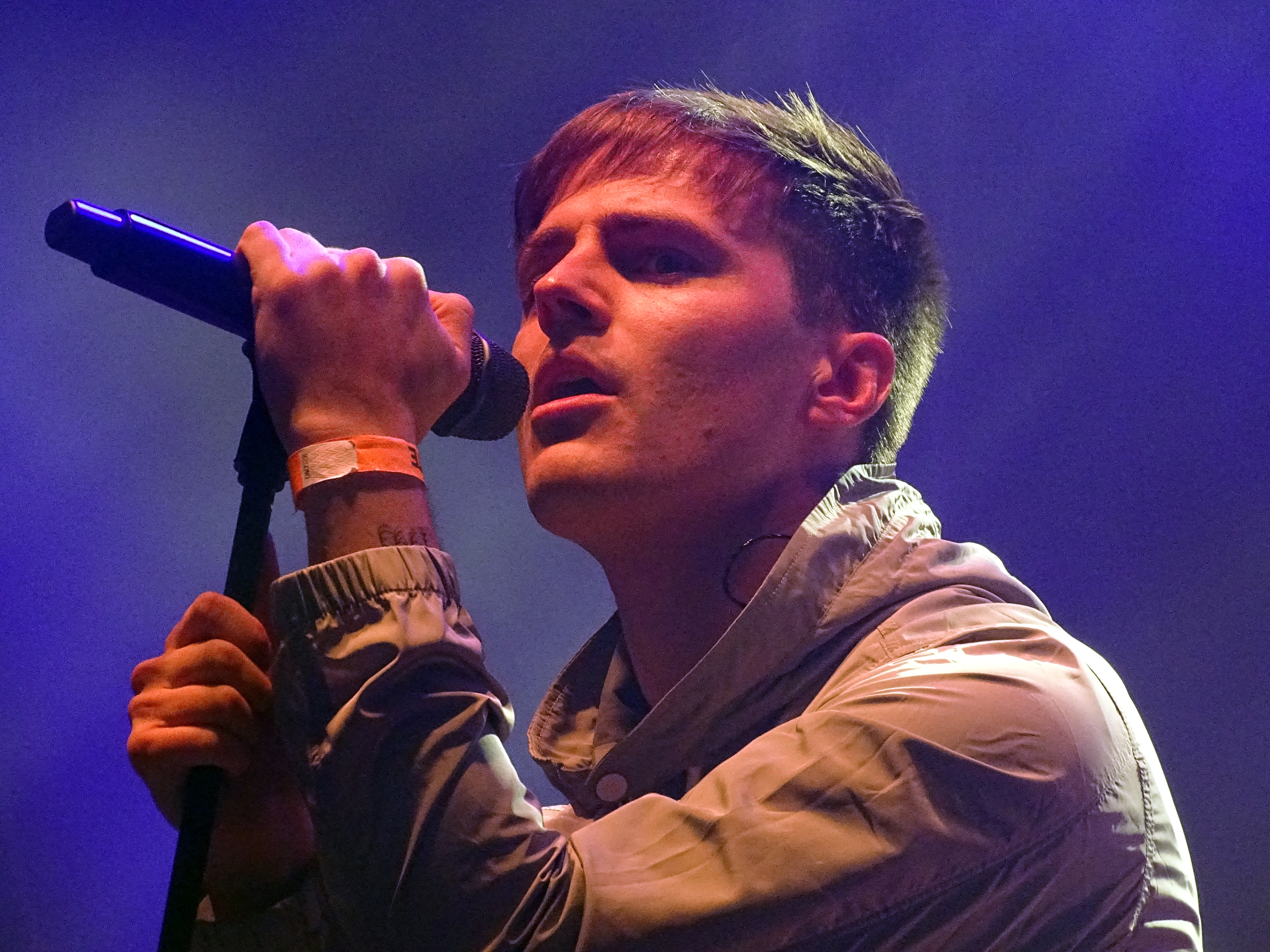
- Gregory in 2022
- Born: Thomas Gregory; 10 November 1995 (age 30); Blackpool, England
- Occupations: Singer, songwriter
- Years active: 2013–present

Thomas Gregory (born 10 November 1995) is an English singer and songwriter. He released his album Heaven in a World So Cold in 2020.

== Early life ==
Tom Gregory was born in Blackpool, England. During his childhood, he notes that some of his biggest idols are Keane, The La's, OneRepublic and Phoenix, referring to the latter as "One of the best French groups from the last twenty years". These musical inspirations Gregory acclaims to the records given to him by his father, and started his complete obsession with music. Growing up on the outskirts of Blackpool, opportunities presented little more than listening to handed down CDs and writing songs in his bedroom; something that the young singer says helped him to learn his craft. He completed his formal school education in the local private Rossall School.

== Career ==
In 2013, Gregory appeared in the second season of The Voice UK but did not make it to the final stages. This failure however did not weaken him, and eventually encouraged the young Brit to pursue a full time career.

In 2016, and years after his knock back on The Voice, he appeared in the popular BBC series The A Word, a drama based on the family dynamics of raising an autistic child. He played the role of Luke Taylor, the boyfriend of Rebecca Hughes and half sister of the main character. Gregory sites that this role was crucial in his singing career as it allowed him to earn extra money in order to fund his music.

After a few years of working part time jobs and travelling around the UK and Germany, he was eventually picked up by German indie record label Kontor Records. He went on later that year to release his first single "Run to You". The track became an instant success and soon reached over 20 million streams, and secured a top 30 chart position on radio. After gathering momentum touring in Germany After previous success with his song "Small Steps", his single "Fingertips" reached the Top 40 Official Charts in Austria and Germany. It also became his most successful solo release, peaking at number 1 on the Official German Radio Chart, number 5 in the Official French Radio Chart and currently gathering over 160 million streams.

His debut album, Heaven in a World So Cold was released. As well as amassing more than 700 million streams to date. Various singles from both albums have since gone on to reach Gold and Platinum status in multiple countries, plus one Diamond certification in France.

== Discography ==
=== Albums ===
Title	Year	Peak chart positions			Certifications	Label
Title	Year	FRA	GER	SWI	Certifications	Label
Heaven in a World So Cold	2020	99	35	80	SNEP: Diamond	Kontor Records / Heaven Shall Dance
Things I Can't Say Out Loud	2021	—	—	67		Kontor Records / Heaven Shall Dance
"—" denotes an album that did not chart or was not released in that territory.

=== Singles ===
Title	Year	Peak chart positions										Certifications	Album
Title	Year	AUT	BEL (Fl)	BEL (Wa)	CIS Air.	FRA	GER	POL Air.	RUS Air.	SWI	UKR Air.	Certifications	Album
"Run to You"	2017	—	—	—	—	—	—	—	—	—	—		Heaven in a World So Cold
"Losing Sleep"	2018	—	—	—	—	—	—	—	—	—	—		Heaven in a World So Cold
"Honest"	2018	—	—	—	—	—	—	—	—	—	—		Heaven in a World So Cold
"Small Steps"	2019	—	—	—	—	—	—	—	—	—	—		Heaven in a World So Cold
"Fingertips"	2020	24	— (Note: "Fingertips" did not reach the region's Ultratop 50 chart, but charted at number 47 on the Ultratip Bubbling Under ranking.)	—	—	72	33	—	—	49	—	BVMI: Gold; SNEP: Platinum	Heaven in a World So Cold
"Never Let Me Down" (with Vize)	2020	4	— (Note: "Never Let Me Down" did not reach the region's Ultratop 50 chart, but charted at number 16 on the Ultratip Bubbling Under ranking.)	— (Note: "Never Let Me Down" did not reach the region's Ultratop 50 chart, but charted at number 26 on the Ultratip Bubbling Under ranking.)	191	192	8	1	—	12	80	BVMI: 3× Gold; ZPAV: 3× Platinum	Heaven in a World So Cold
"Rather Be You"	2020	—	— (Note: "Rather Be You" did not reach the region's Ultratop 50 chart, but charted at Ultratip Bubbling Under ranking.)	— (Note: "Rather Be You" did not reach the region's Ultratop 50 chart, but charted at Ultratip Bubbling Under ranking.)	—	49	—	—	—	53	—	SNEP: Platinum	Heaven in a World So Cold
"River"	2021	32	—	—	—	—	36	—	—	33	—	BVMI: Gold	Things I Can't Say Out Loud
"Footprints"	2021	—	—	—	8	—	—	—	6	—	170		Things I Can't Say Out Loud
"Forget Somebody"	2022	—	—	—	—	—	—	—	—	—	—		Non-album singles
"Never Look Back"	2023	—	—	—	—	—	—	—	—	—	—		Non-album singles
"Dive" (with Lost Frequencies)	2023	—	20	31	—	—	—	10	—	—	—	ZPAV: Gold	All Stand Together
"Glow in the Dark"	2024	—	—	—	18	—	—	—	14	—	89		Non-album singles
"Wreck"	2024	—	—	—	—	—	—	—	—	—	—		Non-album singles
"Dance with Me"	2025	—	—	—	—	—	—	—	—	—	—		Non-album singles
"Make It Right" (with Vize)	2025	—	—	—	—	—	—	—	—	—	—		Non-album singles
"—" denotes a single that did not chart or was not released in that territory.

== Filmography ==
- 2015: The A Word as Luke Taylor (BBC TV series)
