= Narcotic (YouNotUs, Janieck and Senex song) =

Single by YouNotUs, Janieck and Senex
- Released: 26 April 2019
- Studio: Kreuzberg, Berlin, Germany
- Genre: Dance-pop; dance; pop
- Length: 3:12
- Label: Raison Music; B1; Sony
- Composers: Gregor Sahm; Janieck Van De Polder; Tobias Bogdon; Wolfgang "Senex" Schrödl
- Lyricists: Janieck Van De Polder; Wolfgang Schrödl
- Producer: YouNotUs

YouNotUs singles chronology
| "Only Thing We Know" (2018) | "Narcotic" (2019) |

Janieck singles chronology
| "You Don't Have to Like It" (2018) | "Narcotic" (2019) |

Music video
- "Narcotic" on YouTube

"Narcotic" is a song by German duo YouNotUs, Dutch singer and songwriter Janieck and Senex from German alternative rock band Liquido. The song is a remix of Liquido's 1998 song of the same name. It was released through Raison Music Records, which is exclusively-licensed to B1 Recordings, a division of Sony Music, on 26 April 2019. The official music video was released on 14 June 2019.

== Background ==
YouNotUs made the song to celebrate the 20th anniversary of the original song released in 1998. Wolfgang Schrödl, alias Senex, affirmed that when he wrote the song in the late nineties, he did not think it would become a classic one day. YouNotUs said, "We wanted to offer a distraction from everyday life; a world into which our listeners can dream". The German duo confessed to Der Westen editors the genesis of the song. Tobias Bodgon from the duo said that they shared with Wolfgang [Schrödl] a studio complex in Berlin-Kreuzberg. Gregor Sahm, the other member of the duo added, "Actually Wolfgang never wanted to release a cover. But then I worked on it at the Echo aftershow party until he agreed. [...] We wanted to rekindle the song. We wanted to make him recognizable, but give him a new facet. The sweet melancholy that he has in the original, we wanted to give a summery touch." In the studio, Wolfgang Schrödl recorded guitars himself, brought back the old synth of the 90's and sang the C-part, which is an intermediate part with harmonically or rhythmically new parts.

== Critical reception ==
Jazzie of Koeln-News wrote that "YouNotUs transformed the rocking original into a bouncing dance-pop track with great attention to detail, from tunes as soft as a southern sea breeze, to the sunny tropical vibe, to the euphoric drops". Dance-Charts noted that the original version is hard to recognize. They remarked the presence of "guitars, piano chords and airy percussion [in the remake] with the vocals of Janieck". To conclude, they wrote that the three artists "have transformed the rock classic into a bouncing dance-pop track with tropical vibes".

== Track listing ==
Digital download
| No. | Title | Length |
|---|---|---|
| 1. | "Narcotic" | 3:12 |

Digital download – Club Mixes
| No. | Title | Length |
|---|---|---|
| 1. | "Narcotic" (Justin Prince Club Mix) | 3:35 |
| 2. | "Narcotic" (YouNotUs Club Mix) | 5:27 |

Digital download – Remixes
| No. | Title | Length |
|---|---|---|
| 1. | "Narcotic" (Dimitri Vegas & Like Mike vs Ummet Ozcan Remix) | 3:22 |
| 2. | "Narcotic" (Anton Powers Remix) | 2:27 |

== Credits and personnel ==
Credits adapted from Tidal.

- Gregor Sahm – production, composition
- Tobias Bogdon – production, composition
- Janieck Van De Polder – composition, lyrics
- Wolfgang Schrödl – composition, lyrics
- Lex Barkey – master engineering, mix engineering

== Charts ==
=== Weekly charts ===
| Chart (2019) | Peak position |
|---|---|
| Austria (Ö3 Austria Top 40) | 11 |
| Belgium (Ultratip Bubbling Under Flanders) | 11 |
| Belgium (Ultratip Bubbling Under Wallonia) | 10 |
| Croatia Airplay (HRT) | 15 |
| Czech Republic (Rádio – Top 100) | 6 |
| Euro Digital Song Sales (Billboard) | 15 |
| France (SNEP) | 92 |
| Germany (GfK) | 16 |
| Hungary (Rádiós Top 40) | 2 |
| Hungary (Single Top 40) | 11 |
| Latvia (EHR) | 3 |
| Luxembourg Digital Song Sales (Billboard) | 2 |
| Netherlands (Dutch Top 40) | 11 |
| Netherlands (Single Top 100) | 28 |
| Poland (Polish Airplay Top 100) | 6 |
| Romania (Airplay 100) | 30 |
| Slovakia (Rádio Top 100) | 5 |
| Slovenia (SloTop50) | 3 |
| Switzerland (Schweizer Hitparade) | 18 |

=== Year-end charts ===
| Chart (2019) | Position |
|---|---|
| Austria (Ö3 Austria Top 40) | 38 |
| Germany (Official German Charts) | 48 |
| Netherlands (Dutch Top 40) | 54 |
| Slovenia (SloTop50) | 30 |
| Switzerland (Schweizer Hitparade) | 66 |

| Chart (2020) | Position |
|---|---|
| Poland (ZPAV) | 65 |

== Certifications ==
| Region | Certification | Certified units/sales |
|---|---|---|
| Austria (IFPI Austria) | Gold | 15,000^{‡} |
| France (SNEP) | Gold | 100,000^{‡} |
| Germany (BVMI) | Platinum | 400,000^{‡} |
| Poland (ZPAV) Dimitri Vegas & Like Mike vs Ummet Ozcan Remix | Gold | 25,000^{‡} |
| Switzerland (IFPI Switzerland) | Platinum | 20,000^{‡} |
^{‡} Sales+streaming figures based on certification alone.
