= Reality (Lost Frequencies song) =

Single by Lost Frequencies featuring Janieck Devy

from the album Less Is More
- Released: 18 May 2015
- Genre: Tropical house; folk rock; pop rock
- Length: 2:38
- Label: Armada
- Songwriters: Felix de Laet; Janieck van de Polder; Radboud Miedema
- Producers: Lost Frequencies; Radboud Miedema

Lost Frequencies singles chronology
| "Are You with Me" (2014) | "Reality" (2015) | "Eagles Eyes" (2015) |

Music video
- "Reality" on YouTube

"Reality" is a song by Belgian DJ and record producer Lost Frequencies, it was written by Felix de Laet, Janieck van de Polder, and Radboud Miedema. It became available for digital download on 18 August 2015. The song features vocals by Dutch singer and actor Janieck Devy, it topped the charts in over 10 countries.

== Charts ==
=== Weekly charts ===
| Chart (2015–16) | Peak position |
|---|---|
| Australia (ARIA) | 35 |
| Austria (Ö3 Austria Top 40) | 1 |
| Belgium (Ultratop 50 Flanders) | 1 |
| Belgium (Ultratop 50 Wallonia) | 1 |
| Czech Republic Airplay (ČNS IFPI) | 2 |
| Denmark (Tracklisten) | 12 |
| Finland (Suomen virallinen lista) | 8 |
| France (SNEP) | 2 |
| Germany (GfK) | 1 |
| Hungary (Dance Top 40) | 4 |
| Hungary (Rádiós Top 40) | 1 |
| Hungary (Single Top 40) | 1 |
| Hungary (Stream Top 40) | 5 |
| Ireland (IRMA) | 53 |
| Italy (FIMI) | 8 |
| Lebanon (The Official Lebanese Top 20) | 1 |
| Netherlands (Dutch Top 40) | 3 |
| Netherlands (Single Top 100) | 3 |
| New Zealand Heatseekers (Recorded Music NZ) | 1 |
| Norway (VG-lista) | 5 |
| Poland Airplay (ZPAV) | 1 |
| Scottish Singles Sales (Official Charts) | 38 |
| Slovakia Airplay (ČNS IFPI) | 2 |
| Slovenia (SloTop50) | 1 |
| Spain (Promusicae) | 2 |
| Sweden (Sverigetopplistan) | 10 |
| Switzerland (Schweizer Hitparade) | 2 |
| Switzerland (Media Control Romandy) | 1 |
| UK Singles (Official Charts) | 29 |
| US Hot Dance/Electronic Songs (Billboard) | 37 |

=== Year-end charts ===
| Chart (2015) | Position |
|---|---|
| Austria (Ö3 Austria Top 40) | 11 |
| Belgium (Ultratop 50 Flanders) | 4 |
| Belgium Dance (Ultratop Flanders) | 1 |
| Belgium (Ultratop 50 Wallonia) | 10 |
| Belgium Dance (Ultratop Wallonia) | 2 |
| CIS (Tophit) | 27 |
| Germany (Official German Charts) | 14 |
| Hungary (Dance Top 40) | 46 |
| Hungary (Rádiós Top 40) | 18 |
| Hungary (Single Top 40) | 17 |
| Italy (FIMI) | 77 |
| Netherlands (Dutch Top 40) | 8 |
| Netherlands (Single Top 100) | 27 |
| Poland (ZPAV) | 3 |
| Russia Airplay (Tophit) | 24 |
| Slovenia (SloTop50) | 34 |
| Spain (PROMUSICAE) | 68 |
| Sweden (Sverigetopplistan) | 59 |
| Switzerland (Schweizer Hitparade) | 16 |
| Ukraine Airplay (Tophit) | 154 |
| Chart (2016) | Position |
| Argentina (Monitor Latino) | 89 |
| Hungary (Dance Top 40) | 21 |
| Hungary (Rádiós Top 40) | 76 |
| Hungary (Single Top 40) | 67 |
| Italy (FIMI) | 37 |
| Slovenia (SloTop50) | 4 |
| Chart (2017) | Position |
| Hungary (Rádiós Top 40) | 45 |

== Certifications ==
| Region | Certification | Certified units/sales |
|---|---|---|
| Australia (ARIA) | Gold | 35,000^{‡} |
| Belgium (BRMA) | 4× Platinum | 80,000^{‡} |
| Brazil (Pro-Música Brasil) | Platinum | 60,000^{‡} |
| Canada (Music Canada) | Platinum | 80,000^{‡} |
| Denmark (IFPI Danmark) | 2× Platinum | 180,000^{‡} |
| Germany (BVMI) | 3× Gold | 600,000^{‡} |
| Italy (FIMI) | 4× Platinum | 200,000^{‡} |
| Mexico (AMPROFON) | 3× Platinum | 180,000^{‡} |
| Netherlands (NVPI) | 4× Platinum | 120,000^{‡} |
| New Zealand (RMNZ) | 2× Platinum | 60,000^{‡} |
| Norway (IFPI Norway) | 3× Platinum | 120,000^{‡} |
| Poland (ZPAV) | 2× Platinum | 40,000^{‡} |
| Spain (Promusicae) | 2× Platinum | 120,000^{‡} |
| Sweden (GLF) | 3× Platinum | 120,000^{‡} |
| United Kingdom (BPI) | Gold | 400,000^{‡} |
^{‡} Sales+streaming figures based on certification alone.
