= Liquido =

German rock band

Background information
- Origin: Heidelberg and Sinsheim, Germany
- Genres: Rock, Alternative rock, Pop rock
- Years active: 1996–2009
- Labels: Nuclear Blast, Virgin Records, Seven Music
- Past members: Wolfgang Schrödl; Wolfgang "Wolle" Maier; Stefan Schulte-Holthaus; Tim Eiermann

Liquido was a German rock band formed in Sinsheim, Germany in 1996 by four friends: Wolfgang "Wolle" Maier (drums, programming), Wolfgang Schrödl (vocals, guitar, keyboards, piano), Stefan Schulte-Holthaus (bass), and Tim Eiermann (vocals, guitar). The vast majority of their songs are sung in English. Their debut single "Narcotic", recorded in 1997, was a hit in many European countries in 1998. This song was later remixed and became a German, Austrian and Dutch hit for YouNotUs in 2019. Liquido released their first full studio album called "Liquido" in 1999 with Virgin records.

== Discography ==
=== Studio albums ===
- Liquido (Virgin, 1999)
- At the Rocks (Virgin, 2000)
- Alarm! Alarm! (Virgin / EMI, 2002)
- Float (Nuclear Blast, 2005)
- Zoomcraft (Nuclear Blast, 2008)

=== Compilation albums ===
- The Essential (Virgin, 2004)

=== Demo EP ===
- Narcotic (Seven Music, 1997)

=== Singles ===
List of singles, with selected chart positions
Title	Year	Peak chart positions							Album
Title	Year	GER	AUS	AUT	BEL	NLD	SWE	SWI	Album
"Narcotic"	1998	3	49	1	5	7	15	2	Liquido
"Clicklesley"	1999	—	—	—	—	—	—	—	Liquido
"Doubledecker"	1999	47	—	—	—	—	—	35	Liquido
"Tired"	2000	—	—	—	—	—	—	—	At the Rocks
"Play Some Rock"	2000	—	—	—	—	—	—	55	At the Rocks
"Made in California"	2000	—	—	—	—	—	—	—	At the Rocks
"Why Are You Leaving"	2002	—	—	—	—	—	—	—	Alarm! Alarm!
"Stay with Me"	2002	—	—	—	—	—	—	—	Alarm! Alarm!
"Love Me Love Me"	2005	—	—	—	—	—	—	—	Float
"Ordinary Life"	2005	73	—	17	—	—	—	91	Float
"Gameboy"	2008	—	—	—	—	—	—	—	Zoomcraft
"Drop Your Pants"	2008	—	—	—	—	—	—	—	Zoomcraft
