= YouNotUs =

German DJ duo from Berlin

- Younotus in Berlin (2019)

Background information
- Origin: Berlin, Germany
- Genres: Pop, dance-pop, house
- Occupations: DJs, producers
- Years active: 2015–present
- Members: Tobias Philippsen; Gregor Sahm
- Website: itsyounotus.com

YouNotUs, stylized as YOUNOTUS is a German DJ duo, consisting of Tobias Philippsen and Gregor Sahm.

== Career ==
In 2015, he was featured alongside Alle Farben on the Anna Naklab pan-European hit "Supergirl", a cover of Reamonn that reached number 1 in Austria and number 2 in Germany. In 2016, he was featured on "Please Tell Rosie" by German DJ/producer Alle Farben, which peaked at number 2 in Austria and number 3 in Germany and earned the artist a nomination for "Best Single" for the 1LIVE Krone radio award. After another collaboration with Alle Farben and Kelvin Jones named "Only Thing We Know" in 2018, they released a cover of Liquido's 90s tophit "Narcotic" together with Janieck and Senex who was former frontman of Liquido.

In 2019, he was nominated for the German radio award 1LIVE Krone in the category "Best Dance Act". To end the year the duo played in front of a huge international crowd at the official New Year's Eve party at Berlin's Brandenburg Gate.

== Discography ==
=== Singles ===
==== As lead artist ====
Single	Year	Peak positions					Certifications	Album
Single	Year	GER	AUT	FRA	POL	SWI	Certifications	Album
"Narcotic" (with Janieck and Senex)	2019	16	11	92	6	18	BVMI: Platinum; IFPI AUT: Gold; IFPI SWI: Gold; SNEP: Gold; ZPAV: Gold	Non-album singles
"Papa" (with Amber Van Day)	2020	—	—	—	—	—		Non-album singles
"Bye Bye Bye" (with Michael Schulte)	2021	— (Note: "Bye Bye Bye" did not enter the German Singles Chart, but peaked at number 33 on the German Airplay chart.)	—	—	6	—	ZPAV: Gold	Remember Me
"Samba" (with Louis III)	2022	73	55	—	1 (Note: Version with Polish singer Bryska.)	—	ZPAV: Gold	Non-album singles
"What It Feels Like" (with Toby Romeo)	2023	—	—	—	—	—		Non-album singles
"Cinema" (with Cheat Codes featuring Barbz)	2024	—	—	—	22	—		Non-album singles
"Midnight Lover" (with Zak Abel)	2024	—	—	—	—	—		Non-album singles
"Heal My Heart" (with Imanbek)	2024	—	—	—	—	—		Non-album singles
"On My Way" (with Ben Cristovao)	2025	—	—	—	—	—		Non-album singles
"I Want to Know What Love Is"	2025	—	—	—	—	—		Non-album singles
"Canyons" (with Lavinia)	2025	—	—	—	28	—		Non-album singles
"Diamonds" (with Dennis Lloyd)	2026	—	—	—	—	—		Non-album singles
"—" denotes a recording that did not chart or was not released.

==== As featured artist ====
Single	Year	Peak positions						Certifications	Album
Single	Year	GER	AUT	FRA	POL	SPA	SWI	Certifications	Album
"Supergirl" (Anna Naklab featuring Alle Farben and Younotus)	2015	2	1	52	1	52	5	BVMI: Platinum; IFPI AUT: Gold; ZPAV: Diamond	Non-album single
"Please Tell Rosie" (Alle Farben featuring Younotus)	2016	3	2	—	3	—	70	BVMI: Platinum; IFPI AUT: Gold; ZPAV: Gold	Music Is My Best Friend
"Only Thing We Know" (Alle Farben featuring Kelvin Jones and Younotus)	2018	20	24	—	3	—	57	BVMI: Gold; IFPI AUT: Gold	Sticker on My Suitcase
"—" denotes a recording that did not chart or was not released.

=== Remixes ===
Title	Year	Original artist(s)	Album
"Bicycle"	2019	Filous featuring Klei	Non-album remixes
"Cold"	2019	James Blunt	Non-album remixes
"Bang!"	2020	AJR	Non-album remixes
