= Beautiful Life (Lost Frequencies song) =

Single by Lost Frequencies featuring Sandro Cavazza

from the album Less Is More
- Released: 3 June 2016
- Genre: Tropical house
- Length: 2:41
- Label: Armada
- Songwriters: Felix de Laet; Janne Kask; Sandro Cavazza
- Producer: Lost Frequencies

Lost Frequencies singles chronology
"Eagle Eyes" (2015)	"Beautiful Life" (2016)	"What Is Love 2016" (2016)

Sandro Cavazza singles chronology
"Sunset Jesus" (2015)	"Beautiful Life" (2016)	"What It Feels Like" (2017)

Music video
- "Beautiful Life" on YouTube

"Beautiful Life" is a song written by Belgian DJ Lost Frequencies featuring vocals from Swedish singer Sandro Cavazza. The song topped the charts in Belgium and charted on a number of European singles charts.

== Track listing ==
Digital download - Extended Mix
No.	Title	Length
1.	"Beautiful Life" (Extended Mix)	3:34

Digital download
No.	Title	Length
1.	"Beautiful" (featuring Sandro Cavazza)	2:41

== Charts and certifications ==
=== Weekly charts ===
Chart (2016)	Peak position
Austria (Ö3 Austria Top 40)	51
Belgium (Ultratop 50 Flanders)	1
Belgium (Ultratop 50 Wallonia)	1
France (SNEP)	39
Germany (GfK)	50
Netherlands (Mega Top 50)	28
Netherlands (Single Top 100)	65
Spain (PROMUSICAE)	35

=== Year-end charts ===
Chart (2016)	Position
Belgium (Ultratop Flanders)	9
Belgium (Ultratop Wallonia)	24

=== Certifications ===
Region	Certification	Certified units/sales
Belgium (BRMA)	2× Platinum	40,000^{‡}
Brazil (Pro-Música Brasil)	Gold	30,000^{‡}
France (SNEP)	Gold	100,000^{‡}
Germany (BVMI)	Gold	200,000^{‡}
Netherlands (NVPI)	Platinum	40,000^{‡}
^{‡} Sales+streaming figures based on certification alone.
