= Less Is More (Lost Frequencies album) =

Studio album by Lost Frequencies
- Released: 21 October 2016
- Recorded: 2014–16
- Genre: Deep house; tropical house
- Length: 49:03
- Label: Ultra; Armada
- Producer: Felix De Laet

Lost Frequencies chronology
Feelings (2014)	Less Is More (2016)	Alive and Feeling Fine (2019)

Singles from Less Is More
- 1. "Are You with Me" Released: 24 October 2014; 2. "Reality" Released: 24 May 2015; 3. "Beautiful Life" Released: 3 June 2016; 4. "What Is Love 2016" Released: 7 October 2016; 5. "All or Nothing" Released: 17 February 2017; 6. "Here with You" Released: 30 June 2017

Less Is More is the debut studio album by Belgian DJ and record producer Lost Frequencies. It was released on 21 October 2016, by Lost & Cie under exclusive license to Armada Music and Ultra Music. The album was shortlisted by IMPALA (The Independent Music Companies Association) for the Album of the Year Award 2016, which rewards on a yearly basis the best album released on an independent European label.

== Singles ==
"Are You with Me" was released as the first single on 26 January 2015. "Reality" (featuring Janieck Devy) was released as the second single on 24 May 2015. "Beautiful Life" (featuring Sandro Cavazza) was released as the third single on 3 June 2016. "What Is Love 2016" was released as the fourth single on 7 October 2016. "All or Nothing" (featuring Axel Ehnström) was released as the fifth single on 17 February 2017. "Here with You" was released as the sixth single on 30 June 2017.

== Track listing ==
=== Initial release ===
No.	Title	Length
1.	"All or Nothing" (featuring Axel Ehnström)	2:37
2.	"What Is Love 2016"	3:08
3.	"Beautiful Life" (featuring Sandro Cavazza)	2:41
4.	"Sky Is the Limit" (featuring Jake Reese)	2:27
5.	"Reality" (featuring Janieck Devy)	2:38
6.	"Dance with Me"	3:57
7.	"In Too Deep"	3:54
8.	"Dying Bird" (featuring Joakim Wilow)	3:08
9.	"Funky'n Brussels"	3:01
10.	"Send Her My Love"	3:38
11.	"Lift Me Up" (featuring Nick Schilder)	3:12
12.	"Are You with Me"	2:18
13.	"St. Peter"	3:29
14.	"Selfish Love"	3:40
15.	"Footsteps in the Night"	4:24
Total length:		49:03

=== Deluxe edition ===
No.	Title	Length
16.	"What Goes Around Comes Around" (bonus track)	3:11
17.	"Here with You" (bonus track, with Netsky)	3:33
Total length:		55:04

=== Japan bonus tracks ===
18. Anymore (Lost Frequencies remix, original by Alphabet featuring RC)

19. All You Need (Lost Frequencies remix, original by Y.V.E. 48)

20. Liberty City (Lost Frequencies remix, original by Krono)

=== Belgium bonus tracks ===
21. Run (Lost Frequencies remix, original by Emma Bale)

=== 2017 Alternate deluxe edition ===
This version features Lost Frequencies remixed all 17 of his tracks.

== Charts ==
=== Weekly charts ===
Chart (2016)	Peak position
Belgian Albums (Ultratop Flanders)	3
Belgian Albums (Ultratop Wallonia)	10
Dutch Albums (Album Top 100)	40
French Albums (SNEP)	108
Swiss Albums (Schweizer Hitparade)	48

=== Year-end charts ===
Chart (2016)	Position
Belgian Albums (Ultratop Flanders)	52
Belgian Albums (Ultratop Wallonia)	99

Chart (2017)	Position
Belgian Albums (Ultratop Flanders)	101
Belgian Albums (Ultratop Wallonia)	157

== Certifications ==
Region	Certification	Certified units/sales
Denmark (IFPI Danmark)	Gold	10,000^{‡}
France (SNEP)	Gold	50,000^{‡}
Italy (FIMI)	Gold	25,000^{‡}
New Zealand (RMNZ)	Platinum	15,000^{‡}
^{‡} Sales+streaming figures based on certification alone.
