= Questions (Lost Frequencies and James Arthur song) =

Single by Lost Frequencies and James Arthur

from the album All Stand Together
- Released: 3 June 2022
- Length: 2:57
- Label: Epic
- Songwriter(s): Felix de Laet; James Arthur; Dan Smith; Peter Rycroft
- Producer(s): Lost Frequencies

Lost Frequencies singles chronology
"Where Are You Now" (2021)	"Questions" (2022)	"Back to You" (2022)

James Arthur singles chronology
"Lose My Mind" (2022)	"Questions" (2022)	"Heartbeat" (2022)

"Questions" is a song by Belgian DJ Lost Frequencies and English singer and songwriter James Arthur. It was released on 3 June 2022.

== Music video ==
The video for the song was released on YouTube on 17 June 2022.

== Charts ==
=== Weekly charts ===
Weekly chart performance for "Questions"
Chart (2022)	Peak position
Belgium (Ultratop 50 Flanders)	13
Belgium (Ultratop 50 Wallonia)	8
Netherlands (Dutch Top 40)	16
Netherlands (Single Top 100)	52
New Zealand Hot Singles (RMNZ)	14
Sweden Heatseeker (Sverigetopplistan)	8
Switzerland (Schweizer Hitparade)	87
US Hot Dance/Electronic Songs (Billboard)	22

=== Year-end charts ===
2022 year-end chart performance for "Questions"
Chart (2022)	Position
Belgium (Ultratop 50 Flanders)	47
Belgium (Ultratop 50 Wallonia)	44
Netherlands (Dutch Top 40)	50

== Certifications ==
Certifications for "Questions"
Region	Certification	Certified units/sales
Hungary (MAHASZ)	Platinum	4,000^{‡}
Switzerland (IFPI Switzerland)	Gold	10,000^{‡}
^{‡} Sales+streaming figures based on certification alone.
