= Alive and Feeling Fine =

Studio album by Lost Frequencies
- Released: 4 October 2019
- Recorded: 2017–19
- Length: 83:47
- Label: Found Frequencies; Mostiko; Armada
- Producer: Lost Frequencies; Zonderling; Throttle; Steve Mac

Lost Frequencies chronology
Less Is More (2016)	Alive and Feeling Fine (2019)	Cup of Beats (2020)

Singles from Alive and Feeling Fine
- 1. "Crazy" Released: 24 November 2017; 2. "Melody" Released: 27 April 2018; 3. "Like I Love You" Released: 14 September 2018; 4. "Recognise" Released: 8 March 2019; 5. "Truth Never Lies" Released: 6 June 2019; 6. "Sun Is Shining" Released: 9 August 2019; 7. "Black & Blue" Released: 13 September 2019

Alive and Feeling Fine is the second studio album by Belgian DJ and record producer Lost Frequencies, succeeding his 2016 album Less Is More. It was released on 4 October 2019 through Found Frequencies, Mostiko Records and Armada Music. It is composed of two parts, the first containing the seven tracks released by the DJ since his 2017 song "Crazy" and also new songs, while the second part primarily contains remixes. In November 2019, the album has been nominated at Music Industry Awards for the award "Best Album of the Year".

== Background ==
On 15 September 2019, Lost Frequencies announced via Instagram the release date of the album, also posting a photo of its cover. He later indicated, on 30 September, that he would simultaneously release his track "Before Today" featuring Natalie Slade, which has been played for two years in his sets. He commented the song : "It's very different. It's soulful and warm vocals. It's feels maybe almost like African influences, very gospel-ish, but then it goes into electronic music with the guitar sound." A website of the same name as the album was also created to allow fans to pre-save it and go in the draw to win a vinyl edition. Lost Frequencies said about his album :

Compared to my first album, where I clearly split the laidback vibes and the electronic music, everything is merged in this new album. [The first side] starts off with more organic sounds like guitars and a lot of vocals, mixed with electronic touches. But [the second side] is exploring the tracks, the more club-focused it gets. That is because I grew as an artist over the last two years and now produce a lot of different styles and genres of music. The electronic part of me took more and more of a leading role in my music-making process, and I wanted to make that shine throughout my new album as well ! The overall idea I want people to have when they listen to this album is a positive energy with happy, yet emotional feelings. The name of the album says 'Alive and Feeling Fine', and that's how I want people to feel.

— Lost Frequencies, confessing to Armada Music,

According to him, the name of the album came to him thanks to the lyrics "I'm alive and I'm feeling fine" in the song "Sun Is Shining", which was released in August 2019. The DJ also indicated the presence of one notable collaboration, with his girlfriend who did the vocals on "Sweet Dreams". Even if, according to him, they usually don't work together to avoid mixing work and their private life, he decided to depart from his habits because he liked how she sang them when he was starting to work on the track. Lost Frequencies decided to debut an Alive and Feeling Fine tour to support the opus and she will perform the song live on his tour. He indicated it will be his first live tour, and it also will "feature him DJing and playing the keyboards, as well as having guitarists and a drummer perform alongside him". He added : "I'm really happy to do something like this and [have] this new challenge. We're bringing really a whole story with the show, and I think for me that's a really big step towards a better performance onstage and a better experience for people to enjoy the evening."

== Track listing ==
Track listing adapted from iTunes Store, credits adapted from Ultratop.

Side 1
No.	Title	Writer(s)	Producer(s)	Length
1.	"Sun Is Shining"	Felix de Laet; J.J. Grey	Lost Frequencies	3:09
2.	"Truth Never Lies" (featuring Aloe Blacc)	de Laet; Aloe Blacc; Michael James Ryan	Lost Frequencies	3:11
3.	"Crazy" (with Zonderling)	de Laet; Allan Eshuijs; David Benjamin; Gia Koka; Jaap "Zonderling" de Vries; Martijn "Zonderling" van Sonderen	Lost Frequencies; Zonderling	2:33
4.	"Beat of My Heart" (featuring Love Harder)	de Laet; William Simister	Lost Frequencies	3:03
5.	"Black & Blue" (with Mokita)	de Laet; John-Luke Carter	Lost Frequencies	2:42
6.	"Recognise" (featuring FLYNN)	de Laet; Darren Flynn	Lost Frequencies	3:06
7.	"Sweet Dreams"	de Laet; Andres Algaba; Audrey Janssens	Lost Frequencies	3:06
8.	"Like I Love You" (featuring The NGHBRS)	de Laet; Hannah Wilson; Griffin Fornell	Lost Frequencies	3:10
9.	"Lost Like Us" (with Throttle featuring Kyla La Grange)	de Laet; Kyla La Grange; Robert Bergin	Lost Frequencies; Throttle	4:10
10.	"Melody" (featuring James Blunt)	de Laet; James Blunt; Ammar Malik; Steve Mac	Lost Frequencies; Steve Mac	2:29
11.	"Paninaro"	Neil Tennant; Christopher Lowe	Lost Frequencies	2:38
12.	"Before Today" (featuring Natalie Slade)	de Laet; Natalie Slade; Rory Garton-Smith	Lost Frequencies	4:57
13.	"Siente Me" (featuring Calavera & Manya)	de Laet	Lost Frequencies	5:17
Total length:				43:31

Side 2
No.	Title	Writer(s)	Producer(s)	Length
14.	"Like I Love You" (Live Intro Edit) (featuring The NGHBRS)	de Laet; Hannah Wilson; Griffin Fornell	Lost Frequencies	4:44
15.	"Sun Is Shining" (Deluxe Mix)	de Laet; J.J. Grey	Lost Frequencies	3:07
16.	"Recognise" (Deluxe Mix) (featuring FLYNN)	de Laet; Darren Flynn	Lost Frequencies	4:21
17.	"In and Out of Love" (Lost Frequencies 2.0 Remix) (by Armin van Buuren featuring Sharon den Adel)	Armin van Buuren; Benno de Goeij; Sharon den Adel	Armin van Buuren; Benno de Goeij	4:34
18.	"Chan Chan"	Maximo Francisco Repilado Munoz	Lost Frequencies; Ry Cooder	3:40
19.	"Melody" (Two Pauz 'Sognare' Vocal Mix) (featuring James Blunt)	de Laet; James Blunt; Ammar Malik; Steve Mac	Lost Frequencies; Steve Mac; Two Pauz	3:56
20.	"Crazy" (Tomorrowland Intro Mix) (with Zonderling)	de Laet; Allan Eshuijs; David Benjamin; Gia Koka; Jaap "Zonderling" de Vries; Martijn "Zonderling" van Sonderen	Lost Frequencies; Zonderling	4:07
21.	"American Boy" (Lost Frequencies Remix) (by Estelle featuring Kanye West)	Estelle Swaray; Kanye West; William Adams	will.i.am; Lost Frequencies	4:00
22.	"In the Shadows" (Lost Frequencies Delixe Mix) (with The Rasmus)	Lauri Ylönen; Aki Hakala; Eero Heinonen; Pauli Rantasalmi	Lost Frequencies; Martin Hansen; Mikael Nord	3:32
23.	"Are You with Me" (Tomorrowland 2019 Outro Mix)	Terry McBride; Tommy Lee James; Shane McAnally	Lost Frequencies	4:15
Total length:				40:16

== Charts ==
=== Weekly charts ===
Chart (2019)	Peak position
Belgian Albums (Ultratop Flanders)	6
Belgian Albums (Ultratop Wallonia)	13
Dutch Albums (Album Top 100)	51
Swiss Albums (Schweizer Hitparade)	52

=== Year-end charts ===
Chart (2019)	Position
Belgian Albums (Ultratop Flanders)	98

Chart (2020)	Position
Belgian Albums (Ultratop Flanders)	82
Belgian Albums (Ultratop Wallonia)	177
