= The Nghbrs =

American rock band from New York

Nghbrs
- Origin: Long Island, New York, United States
- Genres: Rock, alternative rock
- Years active: 2010–present
- Members: Jordan Schneider; Ian Kenny; Tommy Fleischmann; Eric Vivelo
- Website: www.nghbrs.com

Nghbrs is an American rock band from Long Island, New York, formed in 2010. The band consists of Ian Kenny, Jordan Schneider and Tommy Fleischmann. The name of the band is concepted in "Neighbors".

Their debut album, Twenty One Rooms, was released on July 16, 2013, on Paper + Plastick and the album's lead single, "Hold Up Girl" received heavy media for its innovative use of Instagram. The band also have released 3 EPs Hellomind (2010), Hellomind (Reissue) (2011) and The Nghbrs Collection (2013).

== History ==
=== Formation (2010–2011) ===
Formed in 2010 under the name Neighbors, the band began playing shows throughout New England and released their debut EP, Hellomind, on August 17, 2010. The band changed their name to NGHBRS is January 2011. The band played shows in the Northeast for the following year and steadily gained a healthy following. Nghbrs was featured in the AP&R section of the February 2010 issue of Alternative Press and the band quickly got the attention of producers and record labels. After a successful Kickstarter campaign to help the band join their first major tour with Anarbor in April 2011, the band gained traction and began work on their debut album.

=== Twenty One Rooms (2012) ===
The band began recording their debut album, Twenty One Rooms, in late 2012, with clips and acoustic versions of tracks being released throughout the first half of the year on various sites such as PureVolume, AbsolutePunk and Alternative Press and it was released on July 16, 2013. Absolute Punk gave the album a 90% review and fellow online reviews were generally positive.

The band has played with such acts as Third Eye Blind, Matt & Kim, New Politics, Bad Rabbits and Anarbor.

The band debuted their music video for "Hold Up Girl" on September 18, 2013, through The Wall Street Journal, with the publication calling it "probably the cleverest DIY video since OK Go's string of self-made clips a few years ago." The video was later featured in USA Today, Nylon Guys, Yahoo! News and Mashable.

In September 2013, the band played a sold-out showcase at Brooklyn Bowl for NPR's Chris Douridas. The band played three showcases for the CMJ Music Marathon in October 2013, including one sold-out event at Sullivan Hall on October 18 and was one of thewaster.com's, The Deli Magazine's and Brooklyn Exposed's top picks for the event. The band also were featured in their own four-minute segment on Fuse on October 30, 2013.

In 2014, Eric Vivelo left the band to pursue a career in music education. Since then the band has released two new singles, "Golden Age" and "Small Talk". In 2015, Ian Kenny formed a new band called King Neptune, consisting of the current Nghbrs line-up with the addition of Steve Kupillas and Tom Costa.

== Members ==
Current members

- Ian Kenny – vocals, keys (since 2009)
- Jordan Schneider – drums (since 2009)
- Tommy Fleischmann – guitar (since 2009)

Past members

- Eric Vivelo – bass guitar (2010-2014)

== Discography ==
=== Albums ===
Title	Album details
Twenty One Rooms	Released: July 16, 2013; Label: Paper + Plastick; Format: CD

=== EPs ===
- Hellomind (2010; deluxe reissue: 2011)
- The Nghbrs Collection (2013)
- Golden Age/Small Talk (2014)
