= Janieck Devy =

Dutch singer and actor (born 1994)

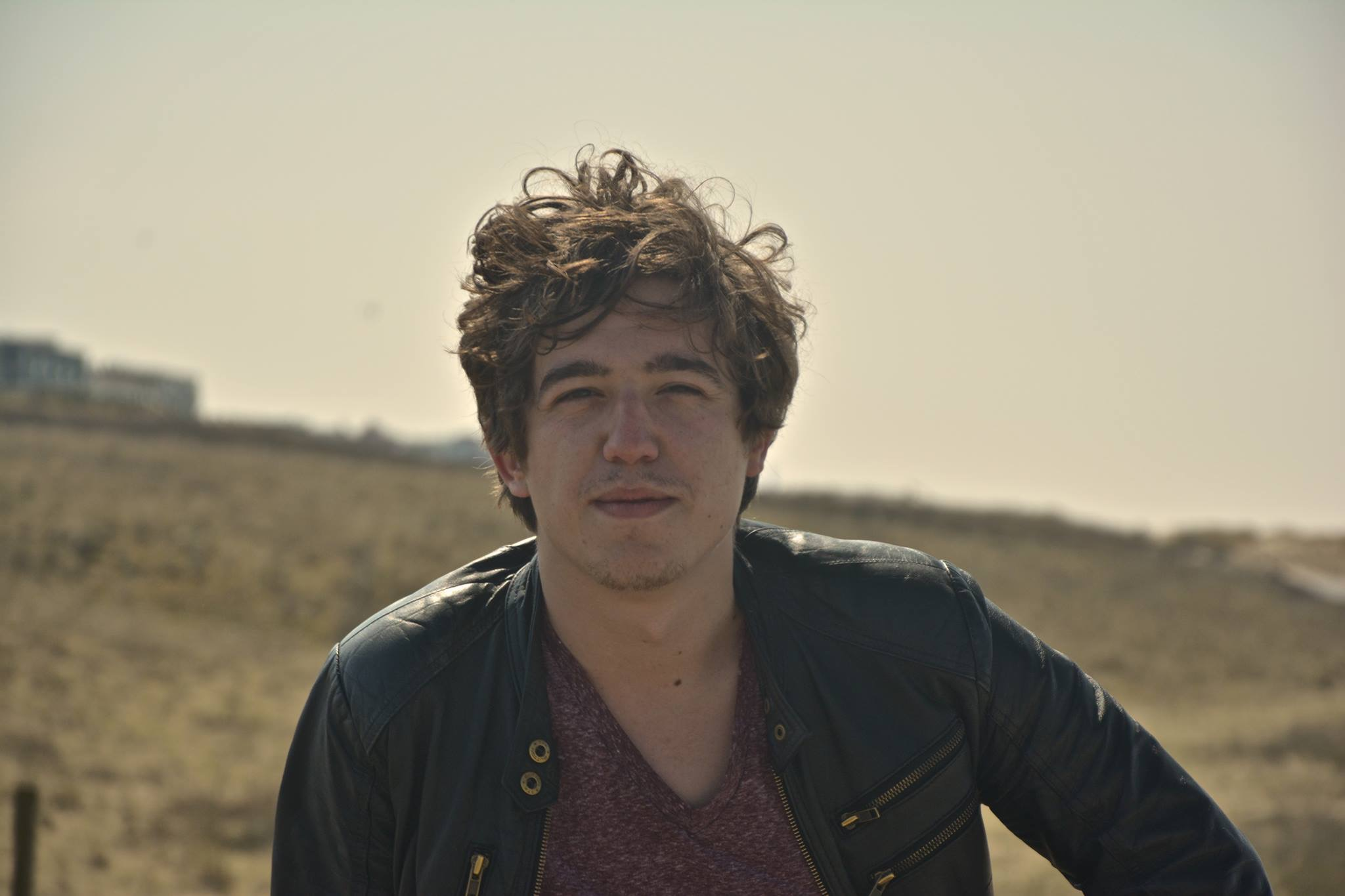
- Born: Janieck van de Polder; 24 June 1994 (age 32); Noordwijk, South Holland, Netherlands
- Occupations: Singer; songwriter; musician; actor
- Musical career
- Also known as: Janieck
- Genres: Pop; dance
- Instruments: Vocals; guitar
- Years active: 2004–present
- Label: Spinnin' Records
- Website: janieck.com

Janieck van de Polder (Dutch pronunciation: [jaːˈnik fɑn də ˈpɔldər]; born 24 June 1994), better known by his stage name Janieck Devy or just the mononym Janieck, is a Dutch singer-songwriter, musician, actor and DJ. He is best known for his portrayal of Pluk in the 2004 film Tow Truck Pluck and the single "Reality" by Lost Frequencies, in which he took the melody, guitar, vocals and lyrics into account.

== Early life ==
Van de Polder was born on 24 June 1994 in Noordwijk, Netherlands. He learned to play the guitar while waiting for the film set and wrote melodies and lyrics for his friends band Lost Fox, as well as made his own songs. At the age of 14, he wrote his first song he ever recorded titled "A Better Man".

== Career ==
=== Acting ===
Van de Polder began acting at the age of ten and his first starring role was a titular role in the 2004 movie Tow Truck Pluck. Afterwards, he appeared in the 2006 movie Crusade in Jeans as Pepin. His next role was Punkjongen in the 2009 movie My Queen Karo. He also played in television series like Van Speyk, Villa Neuzenroode and Grijpstra en de Gier, as well as in the music video of "Deep Blue Sea" by Twarres' Mirjam Timmer and Simple Minds' Jim Kerr.

=== Music ===
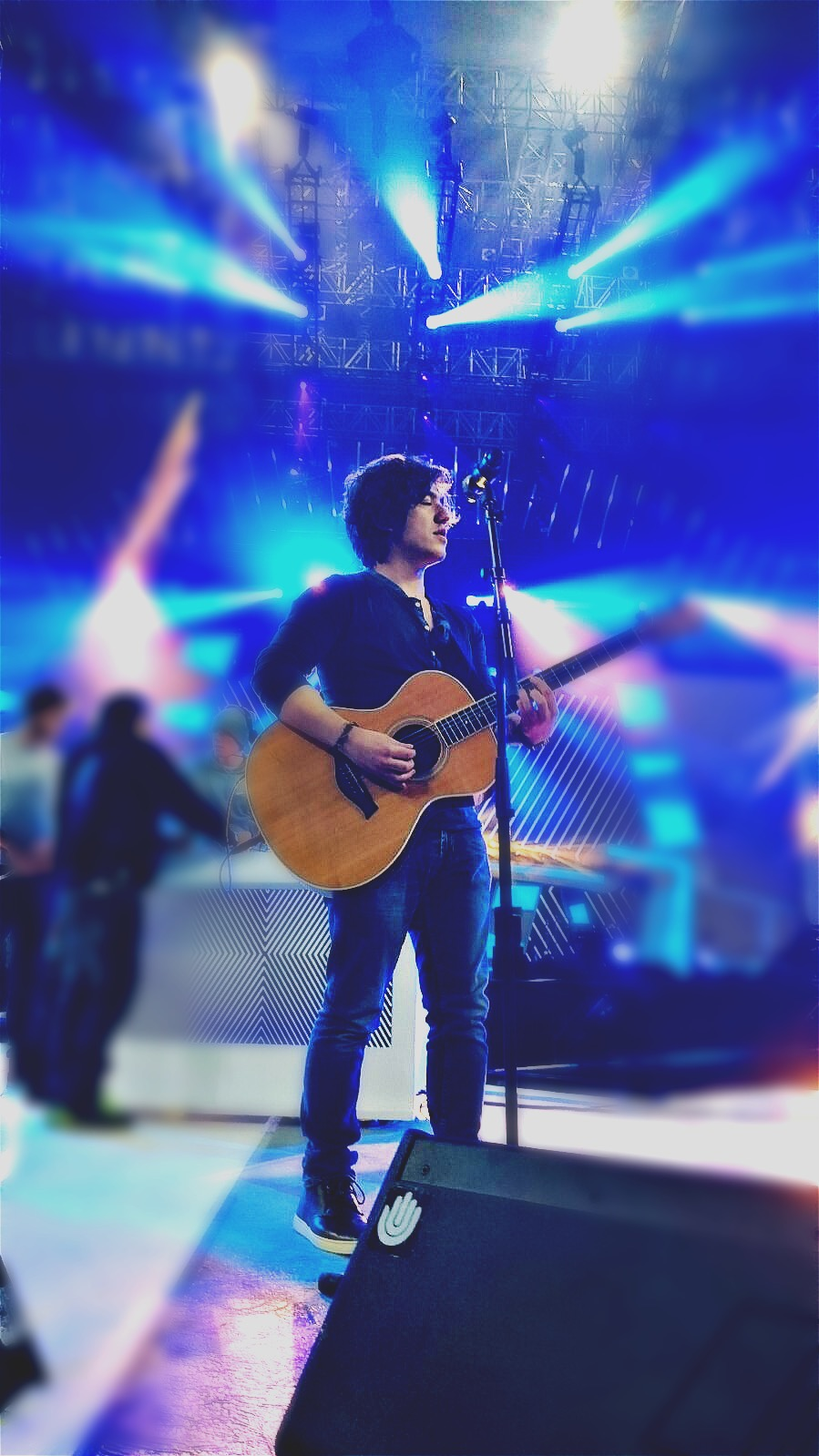
Janieck Devy

Van de Polder made his debut as a singer in 2012, where he sent demos of his songs to producers Rowin Schumm and Tjaart Venema of SBV Music Entertainment who wanted to make a track with him, and his official first release was the single "Six String Thing", which was released on 17 December. Since then, he began using the stage name "Yannick Devy". In 2013, he released his second single titled "Inspire Me". In July 2014, he released his debut studio album titled Survival Guide, simultaneously with the single "Better Man". In 2015, he was featured in Lost Frequencies' single "Reality", which topped the charts in over ten countries for the Belgian DJ. That same year, he was featured in Sascha Braemer's single "Drifting" from his debut album No Home. His single "Don't Give Up on Us" was featured in the 2015 German comedy film Fack ju Göhte 2.

In February 2016, it was announced that van de Polder signed a deal with Spinnin' Records, with whom he released a single titled "Feel the Love", which was edited by Sam Feldt, on 6 May. The single became a summer hit and charted in the Netherlands, Belgium and Sweden. Since then, he began using the mononym "Janieck". On 22 June 2016, to celebrate his birthday, he performed at Giel on NPO 3FM. Shortly afterwards, he and Radboud Miedema co-write "Madison" for Alle Farben's album Music Is My Best Friend. Dutch radio station 100% NL nominated van de Polder as "Breakthrough of the Year" and his single "Feel the Love" as "Hit of the Year".

On 20 January 2017 he released the single "Just Wanna Be with You" on Spinnin' Premium. The single was available as a free download on Spinnin' Records website until 3 February, after that date it was released on iTunes, Beatport and Spotify. On 7 April 2017 he released "Little Hollywood", a collaboration with Alle Farben. A remix pack for the song was released two months later featuring remixes from Krono and Aligee & Lovra.

In December 2017, Janieck released his single "Does it Matter". The song "Does it Matter" samples "Better Off Alone" (1999) by Alice Deejay.

== Awards and nominations ==
Year	Organization	Award	Work	Result	Ref(s)
2015	Buma Awards	Buma Award National	"Reality"	Won	
2015	Buma Awards	Buma Award International	"Reality"	Won	
2016	100% NL	Breakthrough of the Year	Himself	Nominated	
2016	100% NL	Hit of the Year	"Feel the Love" (Sam Feldt Edit)	Nominated	
2016	Buma Awards	Buma Award International	"Feel the Love" (Sam Feldt Edit)	Won	

== Discography ==
=== Studio albums ===
Title	Album details
Survival Guide	Released: 4 July 2014; Label: SBV Music Entertainment; Format: Digital download, CD

=== Singles ===
==== Charted singles ====
Year	Title	Peak chart positions										Certifications	Album
Year	Title	NLD	AUT	BEL (Fl)	BEL (Wa)	FIN	FRA	GER	SWE	SWI	UK	Certifications	Album
2015	"Reality" (Lost Frequencies featuring Janieck Devy)	3	1	1	1	8	2	1	10	2	29	NVPI: Platinum; BEA: 4× Platinum; BPI: Silver; BVMI: 3× Gold; GLF: 3× Platinum	Non-album singles
2016	"Feel the Love" (Sam Feldt Edit) (as Janieck)	44	—	—^{[A]}	—^{[B]}	—	—	—	62	—	—	GLF: Gold	Non-album singles
2017	"Just Wanna Be with You" (as Janieck)	—^{[C]}	—	—^{[D]}	—^{[E]}	—	—	—	—	—	—		Non-album singles
2017	"Little Hollywood" (as Janieck, with Alle Farben)	—	8	—	—^{[F]}	—	—	14	—	51	—	IFPI AUT: Gold; IFPI SWI: Gold	Non-album singles
2017	"Does It Matter" (as Janieck)	68	—	43	—	12	—	—	—	—	—		Non-album singles
2018	"You Don't Have to Like It" (with Lucas & Steve)	—	—	—^{[G]}	—	—	—	—	—	—	—		Non-album singles
2019	"Narcotic" (with Younotus and Senex)	28	11	—^{[H]}	—^{[I]}	—	92	16	—	18	—	BVMI: Platinum; IFPI AUT: Gold; IFPI SWI: Gold; SNEP: Gold	Non-album singles
"—" denotes a recording that did not chart or was not released in that territory.

==== Non-charted singles ====
- 2012: "Six String Thing" [SBV Music Entertainment]
- 2013: "Inspire Me" [SBV Music Entertainment]
- 2014: "Better Man" [SBV Music Entertainment]
- 2015: "Reality" (Lost Frequencies featuring Janieck Devy) [The Bearded Man (Armada)]
- 2015: "Drifting" (Sascha Braemer featuring Janieck Devy) [WhatIPlay Records]
- 2015: "Don't Give Up On Us"
- 2016: "Feel the Love" (Sam Feldt Edit) (as Janieck) [Spinnin' Records]
- 2016: "Madison" (Alle Farben featuring Janieck) [Ultra]
- 2017: "Just Wanna Be with You" (as Janieck) [Spinnin' Premium]
- 2017: "Little Hollywood" (as Janieck, with Alle Farben) [Synesthesia Recordings]
- 2018: "Maybe" (with BUNT.) [Spinnin' Records]
- 2018: "To Rome" (with Deepend) [PIAS]
- 2019: "Somebody New" [Spinnin' Records]
- 2020: "How (Do I Love You) [Spinnin' Records]
- 2021: "Northern Lights [Armada Music]
- 2021: "Life" [Armada Music]

== Filmography ==
Credits adapted from IMDb; sorted by year.

- Tow Truck Pluck (2004) - Pluk
- Crusade in Jeans (2006) - Pepin
- My Queen Karo (2009) - Punkjongen

== Notes ==
- A "Feel the Love" did not enter the Ultratop 50, but peaked on the Flemish Ultratip chart.
- B "Feel the Love" did not enter the Ultratop 50, but peaked on the Walloon Ultratip chart.
- C "Just Wanna Be with You" did not enter the Singles Top 100, but peaked at number 24 on the Tipparade chart.
- D "Just Wanna Be with You" did not enter the Ultratop 50, but peaked at number 7 on the Flemish Dance Bubbling Under chart.
- E "Just Wanna Be with You" did not enter the Ultratop 50, but peaked at number 18 on the Walloon Dance Bubbling Under chart.
- F "Little Hollywood" did not enter the Ultratop 50, but peaked at number 19 on the Walloon Dance Bubbling Under chart.
- G "You Don't Have to Like It" did not enter the Ultratop 50, but peaked at number 32 on the Flemish Ultratip chart.
- H "Narcotic" did not enter the Ultratop 50, but peaked at number 11 on the Flemish Ultratip chart.
- I "Narcotic" did not enter the Ultratop 50, but peaked at number 10 on the Walloon Ultratip chart.
