= Lost Frequencies =

Belgian DJ (born 1993)

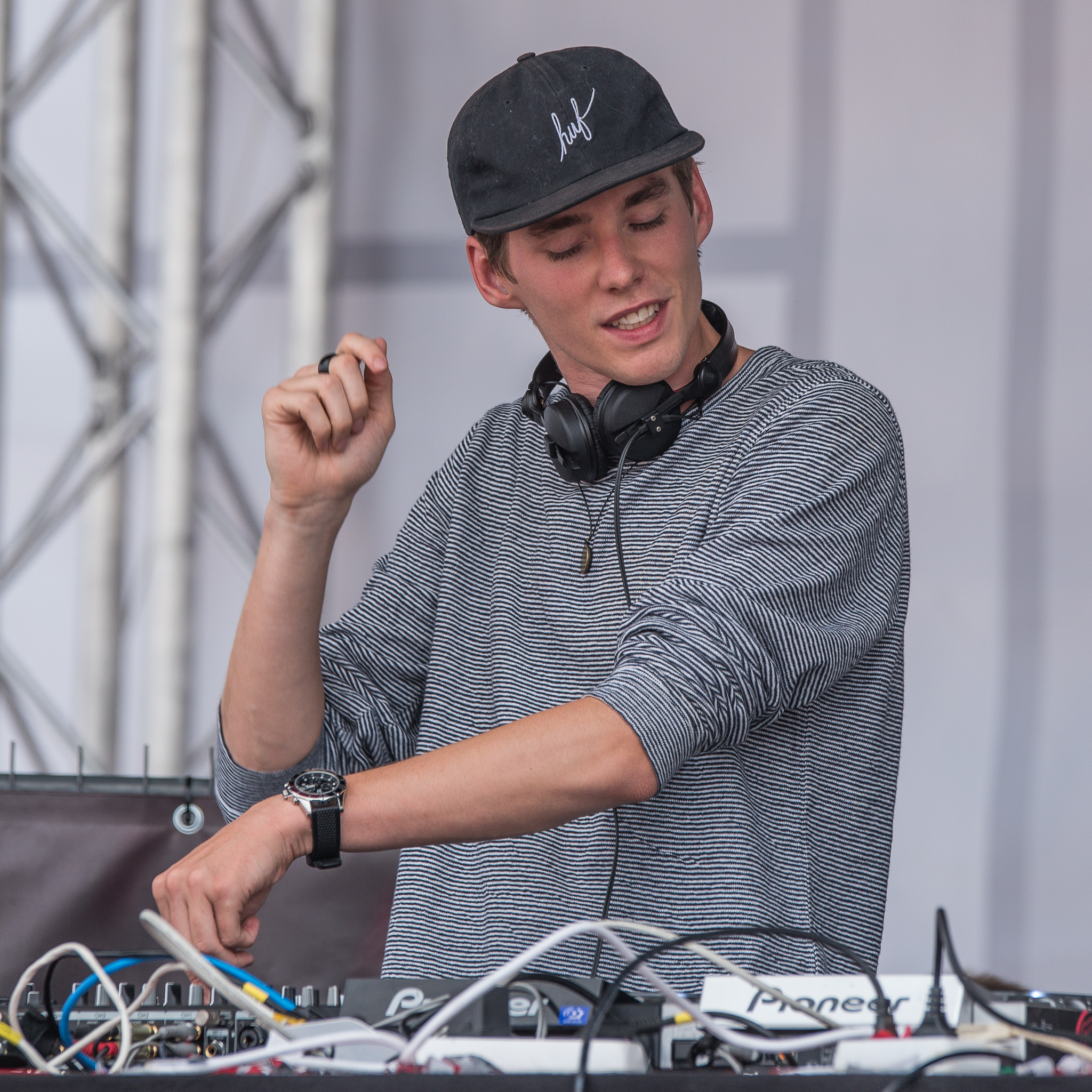
- Lost Frequencies in July 2016

Background information
- Born: Felix De Laet; 30 November 1993 (age 32); Brussels, Belgium
- Genres: Deep house; tropical house
- Occupations: DJ; record producer
- Years active: 2014–present
- Labels: Found Frequencies; Sony Music
- Website: lostfrequencies.com

Felix De Laet (born 30 November 1993), known by his stage name Lost Frequencies, is a Belgian DJ and record producer. He is best known for his singles "Are You with Me" in 2014, "Reality" featuring Janieck Devy in 2015, and "Where Are You Now" with Calum Scott in 2021.

== Career ==
=== Name origin ===
The name "Lost Frequencies" was first used when De Laet had used old songs, which he calls 'lost frequencies' to make remixes when he started the project.

=== 2014–2015: "Are You with Me" ===
In 2014, Lost Frequencies made a remix of country artist Easton Corbin's "Are You with Me". The song had originally appeared in Corbin's second studio album, All Over the Road, but had not been released as a single. Lost Frequencies remixed the song and uploaded it to SoundCloud. Armada Music A&R, and founder of The Bearded Man label, Marwen Tlili discovered the record and subsequently signed it. The official release was on 27 October 2014. The track topped Belgium's Ultratop chart on 15 November 2014, reaching number two in the Walloon chart as well. In 2015, the single peaked the top of the charts of Australia and Austria. It was also charted in several countries in Europe, reaching the top 10 in Finland, France, Netherlands, Norway, Spain, Germany, Poland, Ireland, Switzerland, United Kingdom, Sweden and Turkey.

=== 2016–2017: Less Is More ===
On 3 June 2016, Lost Frequencies released a single, "Beautiful Life", featuring Sandro Cavazza, which is the lead single for his debut studio album. He announced on Twitter that he planned to release the album in September 2016. On 8 September, he remixed a Major Lazer song "Cold Water" featuring Justin Bieber. He released his debut studio album titled Less Is More on 21 October 2016. It includes his massive hit "Are You with Me" as well as follow-up singles "Reality", "Beautiful Life", "What Is Love 2016" and "All Or Nothing" ft. Axel Ehnström. They are soon joining The Chainsmokers on tour in May and June 2017. Less Is More was shortlisted by IMPALA (The Independent Music Companies Association) for the Album of the Year Award 2016, which rewards on a yearly basis the best album released on an independent European label.

=== 2018–2021: Found Frequencies ===
In partnership with Armada Music, De Laet launched his own record label named Found Frequencies, stating "it will serve as a home" for his music and as the "go-to label for up-and-coming talents". His second studio album titled Alive and Feeling Fine was released on 4 October 2019.

=== 2021–present: Subsequent singles ===
In 2021, Lost Frequencies teamed up with British singer Calum Scott for the song "Where Are You Now", which became De Laet's first Top 40 hit for a few years in a number of territories outside of the Benelux region. Some of the countries where the record became a Top 10 hit included Germany, where it peaked at number 5, and Ireland, where it peaked at number one on the Irish Singles Chart.

On 3 June 2022, Lost Frequencies released the song "Questions" with British singer James Arthur.

Lost Frequencies was booked for a New Year’s Eve 2025–26 performance in Dubai, where he spoke in interviews about preparing a special set and premiering surprise new music to close out the year.

== Discography ==
- Less Is More (2016)
- Alive and Feeling Fine (2019)
- All Stand Together (2023)

== Awards and nominations ==
Year	Organization	Award	Work	Result	Ref.
2016	Echo Awards	Dance International	"Are You with Me"	Won	
2016	Echo Awards	Hit of the Year	"Are You with Me"	Won	
2017	WDM Radio Awards	Best New Talent	Himself	Nominated	
2023	Brit Awards	Best International Song	"Where Are You Now"	Nominated	

=== DJ Magazine Top 100 ===
Year	Position	Notes	Ref.
2016	117	Non Entry	
2017	26	New Entry (Up 91)	
2018	17	Up 9	
2019	20	Down 3	
2020	21	Down 1	
2021	25	Down 4	
2022	28	Down 3	
2023	22	Up 6	
