= List of Atlantic Records artists =

This is a list of artists who record, or who have recorded, for Atlantic Records. a division of Warner Music Group. Listed in parentheses are names of affiliated labels for which the artist recorded for Atlantic in conjunction with.

== 0-9 ==
- 2 Live Crew (Luke/Atlantic)
- 2Pac (Death Row/Atlantic)
- 22Gz (Sniper Gang/Atlantic)
- 4 Non Blondes (Interscope/Atlantic)

== A ==
- A Boogie wit da Hoodie (Highbridge/Atlantic)
- Aaliyah (Blackground/Atlantic)
- Aaron Barker (Atlantic Nashville)
- ABBA (US/Canada)
- AC/DC (outside Australia/New Zealand)
- Ace Frehley (Megaforce/Atlantic)
- Adia Victoria
- Adrian Belew
- Against The Current
- Agnetha Fältskog (US)
- Akagündüz Kutbay
- Akinyele (Interscope/Atlantic)
- Al Hibbler
- Alan White
- Alannah Myles
- Albert King
- Alec Benjamin
- Alex Metric
- Alex Newell
- Alex Warren
- Alexis Korner (Atlantic/Metronome)
- Alice Cohen
- Alice Cooper
- All-4-One (Blitzz/Atlantic)
- Ally Brooke
- Alphabeat (Neon Gold/Atlantic)
- Alphaville (US)
- alt-J
- AmiiFy (300/Atlantic UK)
- Anderson East
- Angela Via
- Anita Baker
- Poe (Modern/Atlantic)
- Anna Clendening
- Anne-Marie
- Frida
- A.D.O.R.
- Apartment 26
- Apathy
- April Lawlor
- Archer/Park (Atlantic Nashville)
- Archie Bell & The Drells
- Aretha Franklin
- Arizona
- Art Blakey
- Arthur Brown
- Artifacts (Big Beat/Atlantic)
- Artms (US) (Modhaus/Atlantic)
- Ashnikko
- Audio Two (First Priority Music/Atlantic)
- Audiovent
- Ava Max (Warner/Atlantic)
- Average White Band

== B ==
- B.o.B (Grand Hustle/Rebel Rock/Atlantic)
- Baby Cham
- Bad Company (Swan Song/Atco/Atlantic)
- Bad Religion
- Badfinger (Radio/Atlantic)
- Badlands
- Banda Black Rio (Warner/Elektra/Atlantic)
- Bas Noir
- Bazzi
- Bel Canto (Lava/Atlantic)
- Bella Kay (300/Atlantic)
- Ben E. King
- Ben Platt
- Bent Fabric (Atco/Atlantic)
- Bette Midler
- Betty Wright (Alston/Atlantic)
- Bhad Bhabie (Atlantic/B.H.A.D. Music)
- Big Joe Turner
- Big Kuntry King (Grand Hustle/Atlantic)
- Bill Chinnock
- Bill Haley and the Saddlemen
- Billy "Crash" Craddock (Atlantic Nashville)
- Billy Cobham
- Billy Taylor
- Birdy
- Black Heat
- Blaenavon
- Bloc Party (Vice/Atlantic)
- Blue Magic (Atco/Atlantic)
- Blue Man Group (Lava/Atlantic)
- Blues Brothers
- Bob Geldof (US/Canada)
- Bobby Darin (Atco/Atlantic)
- Bobby Short
- Boney M. (Atco/Atlantic)
- Bonnie Tyler (East West America/Atlantic)
- Boosie Badazz (Trill Entertainment/Atlantic)
- Boz Scaggs
- Brandy
- Breland (Bad Realm/Atlantic)
- Brent Cobb
- Brett Eldredge (Atlantic Nashville)
- Brian Auger (Atco/Atlantic)
- Brian Culbertson
- Briston Maroney
- Broken Hands
- Brook Benton (Cotillion/Atlantic)
- Bruno Mars (Atlantic/Elektra)
- Brynn Cartelli
- Buckcherry (Eleven Seven/Atlantic)
- Burna Boy (Atlantic Records)
- Bush (Trauma/Interscope/Atlantic; later just Atlantic)

== C ==
- Camera Can't Lie
- Cameron Whitcomb
- Camouflage
- Canned Heat
- Cardi B
- Carl Craig
- Cash Cash (Big Beat/Atlantic Records)
- Ce Ce Rogers
- Cece Winans
- CeeLo Green
- Cerrone
- Champion Jack Dupree
- Change
- Changing Faces (Big Beat/Atlantic)
- Charles Mingus
- Charli XCX (Asylum/Atlantic)
- Charlie Puth
- Chef'Special (Fueled by Ramen/Atlantic)
- Chic
- Chris Braide
- Chris Connor
- Chris Rock
- Chris Rush
- Chris Squire
- Chappell Roan
- Christina Perri
- Christine and the Queens
- Chromeo
- Chuck Willis
- Chuckie
- Chuckii Booker
- CKay (Atlantic/Warner Music Africa)
- Clairo
- Clannad (US/Canada)
- Clarence Carter
- Classified
- Clean Bandit
- Clutch
- Cody Simpson
- Cold
- Coldplay (only for distribution in North America)
- Collective Soul
- Company B
- Confederate Railroad (Atlantic Nashville)
- Cool C
- Cordae
- Corook
- Craig David (Telstar/Atlantic) (US)
- Craig G
- Craig Morgan (Atlantic Nashville)
- Cream (US/Canada)
- Crosby, Stills, Nash & Young
- Cuban Link (Terror Squad/Big Beat/Atlantic)
- Curren$y (Jet Life/Atlantic)
- Curtis Fuller

== D ==
- Da Lench Mob (Street Knowledge/East West America/Atlantic)
- Da Youngstas (East West America/Atlantic)
- Dan Hartman
- Daniel Johnston
- Danity Kane (Bad Boy/Atlantic)
- Das EFX (EastWest America/Atlantic)
- David Crosby
- David Gray (iht/Atlantic - outside US/Canada)
- David Rogers
- Dawn Robinson (Q/Atlantic)
- Death Cab for Cutie
- Debbie Gibson
- Debelah Morgan
- Del Water Gap (Canvasback/Atlantic)
- Deniece Williams
- Devonsquare
- Diplo
- DJ Drama (Grand Hustle/Atlantic)
- DLOW
- D'Molls
- Dog Blood
- Dog is Dead
- Don Q (Highbridge/Atlantic)
- Don Toliver (Cactus Jack/We Run It/Atlantic/APG)
- Donna Lewis
- Donna Summer (US/Canada)
- Donna Ulisse (Atlantic Nashville)
- Double X Posse (Big Beat/Atlantic)
- Doug Lazy
- Doug Stone (Atlantic Nashville)
- Dr. Dre (Death Row/Interscope/Atlantic)
- DRAM (Empire/Atlantic)
- Dream Theater (Atco/EastWest/Atlantic)
- Duke Ellington
- Duncan Sheik
- Dusty Springfield (US and Canada)
- Dyme-A-Duzin

== E ==
- Ed Sheeran (Asylum/Atlantic/Elektra)
- Eddie Floyd (Stax/Atlantic)
- Eddie Harris
- Elastica
- Elektric Music
- ELHAE
- Ellie Lawson
- Emerson, Lake & Palmer (Cotillion/Atlantic)
- En Vogue
- ENISA (Highbridge/Atlantic)
- Enya (US/Canada)
- Eric Burdon
- Erroll Garner
- Everything but the Girl (North America)

== F ==
- Fabolous (Desert Storm/Atlantic)
- Fat Joe (Atlantic/Big Beat/Mystic/Terror Squad)
- Finish Ticket
- Fire Town
- Flo Rida (Poe Boy/Atlantic)
- Foreigner
- Foster the People
- Francis Lai (Finnadar/Atlantic)
- Freddie Hubbard
- Frehley's Comet (Megaforce/Atlantic)
- Frenéticas
- Frightened Rabbit
- Funeral for a Friend
- David Foster

== G ==
- Galantis
- Gary Barlow
- Gary Moore (Mirage/Atlantic) (US)
- Gayle (Arthouse/Atlantic)
- Geddy Lee (Anthem/Atlantic) (outside Canada)
- Gene McDaniels
- Genesis (US/Canada)
- George Carlin (Little David/Atlantic)
- George Flynn (Finnadar/Atlantic)
- George Lewis
- Gerald Albright
- Gerardo (Interscope/Atlantic)
- Ghali (Sto/Warner Music Italy/Atlantic)
- Gia Farrell
- Governor (Grand Hustle/Atlantic)
- Girls Next Door (Atlantic Nashville)
- Glen Campbell (Atlantic Nashville)
- Gnarls Barkley (Downtown/Atlantic)
- Golden Earring
- Good Charlotte
- Goldie Lookin Chain (Eastwest/Atlantic)
- GOT7 (Korean releases only)
- Graham Nash
- Gregory Gray (Atco)
- Grouplove (Canvasback/Atlantic)
- Gucci Mane (1017/GUWOP/Atlantic)

== H ==
- Halestorm
- Hall & Oates
- Harold Budd
- Haute and Freddy
- Hayley Kiyoko
- Hayley Williams (Paramore)
- Holly Robinson-Peete
- Honne
- Hootie and the Blowfish
- Horslips
- Hostyle
- Hunter Hayes (Atlantic Nashville)

== I ==
- I Fight Dragons
- Icona Pop (TEN/Big Beat/Atlantic)
- İlhan Mimaroğlu (Finnadar/Atlantic)
- Immortal Technique (Viper/Atlantic)
- In This Moment
- Inch
- INXS (Atco/Atlantic) (US/Canada)
- Iron Butterfly (Atco/Atlantic)
- Ivory Joe Hunter
- Idntt (US) (Modhaus/Atlantic)

== J ==
- J. Geils Band
- Jack Harlow (Generation Now/Atlantic)
- Jack Ü
- Jacquie Lee
- James Blunt (Custard/Atlantic)
- Jamie Lawson
- Jamie Miller
- Jamie Walters
- Janelle Monáe
- Jasmine Thompson
- Jason Derulo
- Jason Mraz
- Je'Von Evans (Heavy Muscle/Atlantic)
- Jax
- Jay Park (Atlantic Records UK)
- JayDaYoungan (Ruffwayy/Atlantic)
- Jaymes Young
- Jay-Z (Roc Nation/Atlantic)
- Jean Carne (Omni/Atlantic)
- Jean-Luc Ponty (Atlantic Jazz)
- Jeff Greene (Aurora Atlantic NYC)
- Jeff Stevens and the Bullets (Atlantic America, later rebranded as Atlantic Nashville)
- Jennifer Love Hewitt
- Jeremy Spencer
- Jess Glynne (Black Butter/Atlantic)
- Jessie James Decker
- Jesse Rutherford
- Jet (outside Australasia)
- Jewel
- Jill Scott (Blues Babe/Atlantic)
- Jim Capaldi
- Jim Carrol Band
- Jim Croce (Saja/Atlantic)
- Jimmy Castor Bunch
- Jimmy Giuffre
- Jimmy Page
- Jimmy Yancey
- Jimmy Yeary (Atlantic Nashville)
- Jive Bunny and the Mastermixers (Atco/Atlantic)
- JJ Fad (Ruthless/Atco/Atlantic)
- João Gilberto (US/Canada)
- Jody Watley (Divine Entertainment/Atlantic)
- Joe Firstman
- Joe Morris
- Joe Tex (Dial/Atlantic)
- Joe McIntyre (Q/Atlantic)
- John Coltrane
- John Michael Montgomery (Atlantic Nashville/Warner Records)
- John Parr (US/Canada)
- John Prine
- Johnny Rivers
- JoJo
- Jomanda (Big Beat/Atlantic)
- Jon Anderson
- Jon Astley
- Joyner Lucas
- Judas Priest (outside Europe and Asia)
- Julian Lennon (US/Canada)
- Juliana Hatfield (Atlantic/Mammoth)
- Julie
- Junior M.A.F.I.A. (Undeas/Big Beat/Atlantic)
- Junior Senior (US)
- Justice
- Juvenile (UTP/Atlantic)

== K ==
- K. Michelle
- Kam (Street Knowledge/East West America/Atlantic)
- Kâni Karaca
- Kap G
- Karen Tobin
- Katy Tiz
- Kehlani
- Keith Jarrett
- Keke Palmer
- Kelly Clarkson (in distribution with Kelly Clarkson Records) which is Kelly Clarkson’s Own Record Label as an Independent Artist
- The Bucketheads (Henry Street Music/Big Beat/Atlantic)
- Kenny Rogers (143/Atlantic)
- Kevin Gates (Bread Winners’ Association/APG/Atlantic)
- Kevin Lyttle (VP/Atlantic)
- Kid Loco
- Kid Rock (Top Dog/Lava/Atlantic)
- Kieran Kane (Atlantic Nashville)
- Kiiara
- Kill Hannah
- Kim Mitchell (US)
- King Crimson (outside Europe)
- King Curtis
- King Missile
- King's X
- Kix
- Knife Party (Big Beat/Atlantic)
- Kodak Black (Dollaz N Dealz/Sniper Gang/Atlantic)
- Kon Kan
- Kristin Garner (Atlantic Nashville)
- KSI
- K-Solo
- Kwabs
- Kwamé
- Kyle (Indie-Pop/Atlantic)
- Kym Sims (Atco/Atlantic)

== L ==
- Breeze
- Larry Willoughby (Atlantic America) (rebranded as Atlantic Nashville)
- Laura Branigan
- Laura Pausini
- Lauren Daigle
- Lauriana Mae
- LaVern Baker
- Gowan (Anthem/Atlantic - outside Canada)
- Lea Salonga
- Led Zeppelin (Swan Song/Atlantic)
- Lee Konitz
- Leif Garrett (Scotti Bros./Atlantic)
- Lennie Tristano
- LeVert
- Lieutenant Stitchie
- Lil Cease (Atlantic/Big Beat/Undeas)
- Lil Baby
- Lil James (Generation Now/Atlantic)
- Lil' Kim (Atlantic/Big Beat/Undeas)
- Lil' O
- Lil Skies
- Lil Uzi Vert (Generation Now/Atlantic)
- Lil Wayne
- Lime (Critique/Atco/Atlantic)
- Lina
- Linda Eder
- Linear
- Lisa Hartman
- Little Boots (679/Atlantic)
- Little Brother (Hall of Justus Music/ABB/Atlantic)
- Little-T and One-Track Mike (Lava/Atlantic)
- Liz Larin
- Lizzo
- LMNT (Atlantic/Walt Disney)
- LOLO
- London Boys
- Lotti Golden (Atlantic/ Warner Music Group)
- Lou Gramm
- Loudness (Atco/Atlantic)
- Louis XIV
- L'Trimm (Hot Productions/Atlantic)
- Lucy Bedroque (DeadAir/Atlantic)
- Lucy Brown
- Lucy Woodward
- Luci4 (Atlantic/Bad Realms)
- Luh Tyler
- Lulu (Atco/Atlantic)
- Lupe Fiasco
- Luke (Luke/Atlantic)
- Lykke Li (Atlantic/LL Recordings)
- Lynyrd Skynyrd

== M ==
- M2M (US)
- Machel Montano
- Maggie Bell
- Maisie Peters
- Major Harris
- Manowar
- Marc Anthony
- Marc Cohn
- MARINA
- Marion Raven
- Mark Morrison
- Marky Mark And The Funky Bunch (Interscope/Atlantic)
- Martin Delray (Atlantic Nashville)
- Martin Lawrence (East West America/Atlantic)
- Martin Solveig
- Mary Wells (Atco/Atlantic)
- Mason Ramsey
- Matchbox Twenty (Lava/Atlantic)
- Matoma
- Matt Bianco (US)
- Matt Corby
- Matt King (Atlantic Nashville)
- Max Frost
- Max Q (US/Canada)
- Mayday Parade
- MC Lyte (First Priority Music/Atlantic)
- MC Skat Kat
- MC5
- Meat Loaf (US/Canada)
- Meco (US)
- Meek Mill (MMG/Dream Chasers/Atlantic)
- Meg Myers
- Mel and Kim
- Mel Tormé
- Melanie Martinez
- Melvins
- Michael Crawford
- Michael Watford (East West America/Atlantic)
- Michel'le (Ruthless/Atco/Atlantic)
- Michie Mee & LA Luv (First Priority Music/Atlantic)
- Mick Jackson
- Mick Jagger
- Mick Jones
- Mighty Joe Plum
- Miike Snow (Downtown/Atlantic)
- Mike & the Mechanics (US/Canada)
- Mike Rutherford (US/Canada)
- Mila Mason (Atlantic Nashville)
- Miley Cyrus
- Miroslav Vitous
- Modern Jazz Quartet
- Molly Kate Kestner
- Mose Allison
- Mott The Hoople (US)
- Moya Brennan (US)
- Mr. Big
- Megan Thee Stallion (1501 Certified/300 Entertainment/Atlantic)
- Malu Trevejo

== N ==
- Nappy Roots
- Narada Michael Walden
- Nathan Dawe
- Neal McCoy (Atlantic Nashville)
- needanamebro (Rebranded as Say Now.)
- NEEDTOBREATHE
- Nice & Wild
- Kamen Nick
- No Address
- Noa Kirel
- NoCap
- Noel Haggard (Atlantic Nashville)
- Noga Erez
- Nolan Thomas (Mirage/Atco/Atlantic)
- Nona Gaye (Third Stone/Atlantic)
- Nu Shooz
- Number_i (Tobe/Atlantic)

== O ==
- O.T. Genasis (Conglomerate/Atlantic)
- O'Bryan (Third Stone/Atlantic Records)
- Off Broadway
- Old Dogs (Atlantic Nashville)
- Oliver Tree
- Omarion (MMG/Atlantic)
- OMB Peezy
- ONE OK ROCK (A-Sketch/Fueled By Ramen/Atlantic, English-language releases only)
- OPM
- Original Flavor
- Ornette Coleman
- Oscar Brown Jr.
- Otis Redding (Atco/Atlantic)
- Otto Knows
- Overkill
- OsamaSon (Atlantic)

== P ==
- P1Harmony (FNC Entertainment/Atlantic) – Korean releases only
- P$C (Grand Hustle/Atlantic)
- P.O.D.
- Pajama Party
- Charlie Puth
- Pantera (Atco/Atlantic)
- Paolo Nutini
- Paramore (Fueled By Ramen/Atlantic)
- Passport
- Patrick Moraz (US/Canada)
- St. Paul
- Paul Rodgers
- Paul Wall (Asylum/Atlantic/Swishahouse)
- Percy Humphrey
- Percy Sledge
- Peter Frampton
- Peter Gabriel (Atco/Atlantic - US/Canada)
- Ph.D. (US)
- Phil Collins (Face Value/Craft/Rhino/Atlantic) (US/Canada then worldwide)
- Philly's Most Wanted
- Pink Sweats
- Pino Presti
- PJ
- Plan B
- Player
- Plies (Big Gates/Slip-N-Slide/Atlantic)
- Plus One
- PnB Rock
- Poison the Well
- Portugal. The Man
- President
- Primus (Interscope/Atlantic)
- Professor Griff (Luke/Atlantic)
- Professor Longhair
- Project 86
- Prospect (Atlantic/Terror Squad)
- Pulse Ultra
- Punch Miller

== Q ==
- Quad City DJs (Big Beat/Atlantic)
- Quando Rondo (Never Broke Again, LLC/Atlantic)
- Queensrÿche

== R ==
- Rahky
- Ratt
- Ravyn Lenae
- Ray Charles
- Ray J
- Ray Kennedy (Atlantic Nashville)
- RBL Posse (Big Beat/Atlantic)
- Reble (Homegrown/Atlantic)
- Redd Kross
- Regina
- Reiley
- Rev3rent
- Richard Barone (MESA/Bluemoon/Atlantic)
- Richard Wagner
- Rico Nasty
- Rick Ross
- Ringo Starr (US/Canada)
- Rita Ora
- Rival Sons
- Rob Thomas (Melisma/Atlantic)
- Robbie Patton
- Robert James Waller
- Robert Plant (Es Paranza/Atlantic)
- Roberta Flack
- Robin Lee (Atlantic Nashville)
- Robin S. (Big Beat/Atlantic)
- Robin Schulz
- Rockie Fresh (MMG/Atlantic)
- Roddy Ricch
- Rodney O & Joe Cooley
- Roger Ballard (Atlantic Nashville)
- Roger Daltrey (US/Canada)
- Roland Kirk
- Rosé (under exclusive license to Atlantic excluding Korea)
- Roxy Music (Atco/Atlantic) (US/Canada)
- Roy Buchanan
- Jagwar Twin
- Ruarri Joseph
- Rudimental (Black Butter/Asylum/Atlantic)
- Rumer (East West/Atlantic)
- RuPaul (Rhino/Atlantic)
- Rush (Anthem/Atlantic) (outside Canada)
- Rust
- Ruth Brown
- Ryan Cabrera

== S ==
- Sabrina Claudio (SC Entertainment/Atlantic)
- Sad Café (Swan Song/Atlantic then just Atlantic) (US/Canada)
- Sage the Gemini (Global Gemini/Atlantic)
- Saigon (Fort Knocks/Atlantic)
- Saint Phnx
- Say Now
- Lea Salonga (US)
- Sam and Dave
- Sam Martin
- Savatage
- Sean Paul (VP/Atlantic) (outside Canada)
- Serena Ryder
- Sérgio Mendes
- Seven Mary Three (Mammoth/Atlantic)
- SF9 (band) (FNC Entertainment/Atlantic)
- Shadows Fall
- Shannon (Mirage/Atco/Atlantic)
- Shanty (Warner/Atlantic Malaysia)
- Sharon Tandy
- Shawty Lo (D4L/Dee Money/Poe Boy/Asylum/Atlantic)
- Shinedown
- Shoreline Mafia
- Shorty Rogers
- Sia (Atlantic/Warner)
- Sexyy Red (Rebel/Atlantic)
- Silverchair (Eleven/Atlantic)
- Simple Plan (Lava/Atlantic)
- Sinéad O'Connor
- Sissy Spacek
- Sister Sledge (Cotillion/Atlantic)
- Skid Row
- Rubin Skillet (since 1991) (Lava/Atlantic) – 2004-2024
- Skrillex (Big Beat/Atlantic)
- Skyy
- Slave (Cotillion/Atlantic)
- Sleeze Beez
- Small Faces (US)
- Snoop Doggy Dogg (Death Row/Interscope/Atlantic)
- Snow Tha Product (Product Ent./Atlantic)
- Solomon Burke
- Sophia Fresh (Nappy Boy Entertainment/Atlantic)
- Sorana
- Sorisa
- Soul Brothers Six
- South Arcade
- South 65 (Atlantic Nashville)
- Southside Johhny & the Jukes (Mirage/Atco/Atlantic)
- Sparks
- Stacey Q (Atlantic)
- Stacy Lattisaw (Cotillion/Atlantic)
- Stars on 45 (Radio/Atlantic)
- Stephen Stills
- Steve "Silk" Hurley
- Steve Arrington
- Steve Howe
- Stevie B (Saja/Atlantic)
- Stevie Nicks (Modern/Atlantic) (US/Canada)
- Stick McGhee
- Stone Temple Pilots
- Straight No Chaser
- Sugar Ray (Lava/Atlantic)
- Suzanne Ciani (Finnadar/Atlantic)
- Suzy Q
- Sweet Inspirations
- Sweet Sensation (Atco/Atlantic)
- Switchfoot (Lowercase People/Atlantic)
- System of a Down

== T ==
- T.I. (Grand Hustle/Atlantic)
- Tally Hall (Quack! Media/Atlantic)
- Tamia
- Tank (R&B Money/Atlantic)
- Taproot
- Tarkan
- Tayla Parx
- Teddybears STHLM
- Teenage Disaster
- Telex
- Ten City
- Terror Fabulous (East West America/Atlantic)
- Testament
- Tha Dogg Pound (Death Row/Interscope/Atlantic)
- The Academy Is... (Fueled By Ramen/Decaydance/Atlantic)
- The Bellamy Brothers (Atlantic Nashville)
- The Beloved (US)
- The Braxtons
- The Brides of Funkenstein
- The Cardinals
- The Clovers
- The Coasters
- The Corrs (143/Atlantic)
- The Cult (Lava/Atlantic)
- The D.O.C. (Ruthless/Atco/Atlantic)
- The Darkness
- The Delta Rhythm Boys
- The Donnas
- The Drifters
- The Family Stand
- The Firm
- The Fixx
- The Format
- The Funky Worm
- The Hellp
- The Honeydrippers (Es Paranza/Atlantic)
- The Hutchens (Atlantic Nashville)
- The Kinison
- The Knocks (Big Beat/Atlantic)
- The Lemonheads
- The Manhattan Transfer
- The Marcy Brothers (Atlantic Nashville)
- The Orwells (Canvasback Music/Atlantic)
- The Pointer Sisters (Planet/Atlantic)
- The Rascals
- The Rolling Stones (Rolling Stones/Atlantic)
- The Spinners
- The Streets (Vice/Atlantic)
- The System
- The Temptations
- The Trammps
- The Velvet Underground
- The War on Drugs
- Theory of a Deadman
- Tim Maia (Warner/Elektra/Atlantic)
- Tim Rushlow (Atlantic/Warner Music Nashville)
- Timbaland & Magoo (Blackground/Atlantic)
- Tiny Grimes
- TNT
- Tommy Bolin (Nemperor/Atlantic)
- Tommy Shaw
- Tony Banks (US/Canada)
- Tori Amos
- Tracy Lawrence (Atlantic Nashville)
- Trans-Siberian Orchestra (Lava/Atlantic)
- Trevor Jackson
- Trey Songz (Songbook/Atlantic)
- Trick Daddy (Slip-N-Slide/Atlantic)
- Trina (Slip-N-Slide/Atlantic)
- TripleS (US) (Modhaus/Atlantic)
- Troop
- Tuff
- Twenty One Pilots (Fueled by Ramen/Atlantic/Elektra)
- Twista (Big Beat/Atlantic)
- Twisted Sister
- Tortur3 T (Heavy Muscle/Atlantic)
- Ty Dolla $ign (Taylor Gang/Pu$haz Ink/Atlantic)

== U ==
- Uncle Kracker (Top Dog/Lava/Atlantic)

== V ==
- Vance Joy (Outside Australia and New Zealand)
- Vandenberg (Atco)
- Vangelis
- Vicious Rumors
- Virgos Merlot
- Voggue

== W ==
- Waka Flocka Flame (Brick Squad Monopoly/1017/Atlantic)
- Wallows
- Wayne Wonder (VP/Atlantic)
- Whethan
- Whigfield (Curb/Atlantic)
- White Lion (except Japan)
- Whitesnake (Mirage/Atlantic (US/Canada))
- Why Don't We
- Wilder Woods
- Willa Ford (Lava/Atlantic)
- Willie Nelson
- Wilson Pickett
- Winger
- Wishbone Ash (US/Canada)
- Wiz Khalifa (Taylor Gang/Atlantic)
- Woody Lee (Atlantic Nashville)
- Wrathchild America

== X ==
- X Japan (East West America/Atlantic)
- Xavier Dunn (1825/Atlantic)
- Xaviersobased

== Y ==
- Y Kant Tori Read
- Yanni
- YBN Almighty Jay
- YBN Nahmir
- Yes (Atco/Atlantic)
- YNW Melly (300/Atlantic)
- Yomo & Maulkie (Ruthless/Atco/Atlantic)
- Young Dro (Grand Hustle/Atlantic)
- Young Thug (YSL/300/Atlantic)
- Yo-Yo (Street Knowledge/East West America/Atlantic)
- Yusef Lateef
- Yusuf Islam (US/Canada/Mexico)
- Yaelokre (Atlantic)
- Young Khalifa (Atlantic)

== Z ==
- Zac Brown Band (Southern Ground/Atlantic)
- Zak Abel
- Zebra
- Zero 7
