= Diamond Girl =

Diamond Girl may refer to:

- Diamond Girl (film), a 1998 television film based on the Diana Palmer novel
- Diamond Girl (album), an album by Seals and Crofts
- "Diamond Girl" (Seals and Crofts song), 1973
- "Diamond Girl" (Ryan Leslie song), 2007
- "Diamond Girl", a single released by Nice & Wild in 1986
- Diamond Girl, a novel by Diana Palmer
- The Diamond Girls, a children's novel by Jacqueline Wilson
- "Diamond Girl", a song by Thaman S, Silambarasan TR and Suchitra from the 2013 Indian film Baadshah
