= All Over the Road (song) =

Single by Easton Corbin

from the album All Over the Road
- Released: January 14, 2013
- Recorded: 2011–12
- Genre: Country
- Length: 2:43
- Label: Mercury Nashville
- Songwriters: Carson Chamberlain; Ashley Gorley; Wade Kirby
- Producer: Carson Chamberlain

Easton Corbin singles chronology
"Lovin' You Is Fun" (2012)	"All Over the Road" (2013)	"Clockwork" (2014)

"All Over the Road" is a song written by Carson Chamberlain, Ashley Gorley, and Wade Kirby and recorded by American country music artist Easton Corbin. It was released in January 2013 as the second single and title track from Corbin's album of the same name.

== Content ==
The song is about a male who is pulled over by a police officer for reckless driving. The narrator claims that his driving is not due to alcohol intoxication, but rather because of the actions of his lover, who is showing affection to him.

== Critical reception ==
Ben Foster of Country Universe gave the song an A grade. He writes that this song, "soars with an airy, infectious melody, and a delightful fiddle and steel-friendly arrangement recalling the country music of the nineties." He also says that, "[Corbin's] inviting vocal delivery coasts along on the catchy melody with the same breezy abandon that made “Roll with It” so lovable." He finishes by saying that, "The song hits all the right stops to create the perfect feel-good jam, with the cheeky-sounding guitar licks and the “Little bit o’ left, little bit o’ right” hook almost seeming to mimic the movements of the swerving vehicle."

Taste of Country editor Billy Dukes rated the song 4.5 stars out of 5. Dukes states, "The production is as clean as reliably country as ever. Guitar licks snap from the stereo as he breezes through his vocals with perceived effortlessness." and says that "Corbin is quickly becoming one of the more dependable radio artists, but songs like this will boost his concert ticket and CD sales. ‘All Over the Road’ is his best single to date, one that promises to leave fans buzzing like they did when he first released ‘A Little More Country Than That’ three years ago."

== Music videos ==
An acoustic music video, directed by Stephen Shepherd, premiered in September 2012. A live performance video from Yahoo! Ram Country, directed by Steve Angus, premiered in January 2013. The official music video, directed by Roman White and featuring an appearance by Amber Sym, premiered on February 22, 2013.

== Chart and sales performance ==
"All Over the Road" debuted at number 59 on the U.S. Billboard Country Airplay chart for the week of January 19, 2013. It also debuted at number 49 on the U.S. Billboard Hot Country Songs chart for the week of February 16, 2013. It also debuted at number 98 on the U.S. Billboard Hot 100 chart for the week of May 25, 2013. It also debuted at number 97 on the Canadian Hot 100 chart for the week of July 13, 2013. As of September 2013, the single has sold 572,000 copies in the United States.

Chart (2013)	Peak position
Canada Hot 100 (Billboard)	78
Canada Country (Billboard)	12
US Billboard Hot 100	51
US Country Airplay (Billboard)	3
US Hot Country Songs (Billboard)	9

=== Year-end charts ===
Chart (2013)	Position
US Country Airplay (Billboard)	3
US Hot Country Songs (Billboard)	25

== Certifications ==
Region	Certification	Certified units/sales
United States (RIAA)	2× Platinum	2,000,000^{‡}
^{‡} Sales+streaming figures based on certification alone.
