= Easton Corbin (album) =

Album by Easton Corbin

Studio album by Easton Corbin
- Released: March 2, 2010
- Recorded: 2009
- Genre: Neotraditional country
- Length: 35:08
- Label: Mercury Nashville
- Producer: Carson Chamberlain

Easton Corbin chronology
A Little More Country Than That (EP) (2009)	Easton Corbin (2010)	All Over the Road (2012)

Singles from Easton Corbin
- 1. "A Little More Country Than That" Released: August 4, 2009; 2. "Roll With It" Released: April 26, 2010; 3. "I Can't Love You Back" Released: November 8, 2010

Easton Corbin is the debut studio album by American country music artist Easton Corbin. It was released on March 2, 2010 via Universal Music Group Nashville's Mercury Nashville division. The album's first two singles, "A Little More Country Than That" and "Roll With It", became Corbin's first two number one hits on the US Billboard Hot Country Songs chart. The album's third single, "I Can't Love You Back", peaked at number 14.

== Singles ==
The first single from the album, "A Little More Country Than That," was released to Country radio in July 2009. It subsequently debuted on the Billboard Hot Country Songs chart for the chart week of August 22, 2009. In March 2010, it became his first Number One song. Followup "Roll with It" has also reached number one on the same chart. The album's third single "I Can't Love You Back" released to radio on November 8, 2010.

In a news blog on CMT, Corbin talked about the first release from his debut album saying: "This song identifies who I am. It shows character and that's important where I'm from. You learn to say 'yes, ma'am' and 'no, sir' and to open the door for the ladies."

== Reception ==
=== Commercial ===
Easton Corbin debuted at #4 on the U.S. Billboard Top Country Albums and #10 on the U.S. Billboard 200, selling 43,000 copies in its first week of release. As of the chart dated May 21, 2011, the album has sold 371,167 copies in the US.

=== Critical ===
Professional ratings
Review scores
Source	Rating
Allmusic	3.5/5 stars
Billboard	(favorable)
The Boston Globe	(positive)
Country Weekly	3.5/5 stars
Entertainment Weekly	B+
Slant Magazine	2.5/5 stars
Engine 145	4/5 stars

Upon its release, Easton Corbin received generally positive reviews from most music critics. At Metacritic, which assigns a normalized rating out of 100 to reviews from mainstream critics, the album received an average score of 75, based on 5 reviews, which indicates "generally favorable reviews".

Karlie Justus of Engine 145 gave the album four out of five stars, citing the neotraditionalist country production choices, that make the album sound modern, fresh, and mainstream-friendly. She also praises the album's producer, Carson Chamberlain, for giving the album an "easy, natural feel." Stuart Munro with The Boston Globe called it a "real country" record, saying it "challenges those who claim there’s no longer any “real country’’ to be found in modern mainstream country music" and positively compared Corbin to George Strait and Alan Jackson.

Country Weekly reviewer Jessica Phillips also commended Chamberlain's production and compared Corbin's voice to those of George Strait and Keith Whitley, saying that Corbin sounded "authentic and confident." She gave the album three-and-a-half stars out of five. Allmusic critic Todd Sterling also compared Corbin's voice to Strait's and praised the neotraditionalist country sound of the album, giving it three-and-a-half stars out of five. In her review for Entertainment Weekly, critic Whitney Pastorek also noted the similarities between Corbin's voice and Strait's, and she suggested that the album would make a listener "remember why you fell in love with country music in the first place" and gave the album a "B+" grade. Slant Magazine critic Jonathan Keefe was less enthusiastic, praising Corbin both for his songwriting and his ambition in emulating a "genre legend" like Strait, but commenting that the material on the album was generally weak and rating the album with two-and-a-half stars out of five.

== Track listing ==
No.	Title	Writer(s)	Length
1.	"Roll with It"	Tony Lane, David Lee, Johnny Park	3:27
2.	"A Little More Country Than That"	Rory Feek, Don Poythress, Wynn Varble	2:52
3.	"This Far from Memphis"	Easton Corbin, Carson Chamberlain, Mark D. Sanders	3:17
4.	"The Way Love Looks"	Corbin, Chamberlain, Sanders	2:41
5.	"Someday When I'm Old"	Chris Lindsey, Aimee Mayo, Troy Verges	3:22
6.	"Don't Ask Me About a Woman"	Tom Botkin, Kevin Denney, Alex Dooley	3:36
7.	"I Can't Love You Back"	Chamberlain, Jeff Hyde, Clint Daniels	4:05
8.	"A Lot to Learn About Livin'"	Liz Hengber, Sonny LeMaire, Clay Mills	3:46
9.	"Let Alone You"	Chamberlain, Gary Harrison, Sonny Tillis	3:14
10.	"That'll Make You Wanna Drink"	Corbin, Chamberlain, Jimmy Yeary	3:26
11.	"Leavin' a Lonely Town"	Corbin, Chamberlain, Sanders	3:22

== Personnel ==
Production

- Darryl Bowslaugh – Make-Up
- Jason Campbell – Production Coordination
- Carson Chamberlain – Producer
- Joe Fisher – A&R
- John Kelton – Engineer, Mixing
- Renee Layer – Wardrobe
- Ken Love – Mastering
- James Minchin III – Photography
- Karen Naff – Art Direction, Design
- Matt Rovey – Assistant, Engineer
- Brian Wright – A&R
- Stephanie Wright – A&R

Additional musicians

- Eddie Bayers – Drums
- Jimmy Carter – Bass guitar
- Easton Corbin – Lead Vocals
- Larry Franklin – Fiddle, Mandolin
- Paul Franklin – Steel Guitar
- Wes Hightower – Background Vocals
- Brent Mason – Electric guitar
- James Mitchell – Electric guitar
- Gary Prim – Hammond B3 Organ, Keyboards, piano, Wurlitzer
- Biff Watson – Acoustic Guitar, Gut String Guitar
- Glenn Worf – Bass guitar

== Charts ==
=== Album ===
Chart (2010)	Peak position
U.S. Billboard 200	10
U.S. Billboard Top Country Albums	4

=== End of year charts ===
Chart (2010)	Peak position
US Billboard 200	125
US Billboard Top Country Albums	22

=== Singles ===
Year	Single	Peak chart positions		
Year	Single	US Country	US	CAN
2009	"A Little More Country Than That"	1	42	66
2010	"Roll with It"	1	55	88
2010	"I Can't Love You Back"	14	76	—
"—" denotes releases that did not chart

== Certifications ==
Region	Certification	Certified units/sales
United States (RIAA)	Gold	500,000^{‡}
^{‡} Sales+streaming figures based on certification alone.
