= Cliffhanger (novel) =

1995 novel by Jacqueline Wilson

- Updated edition cover
- Author: Jacqueline Wilson
- Illustrator: Nick Sharratt
- Cover artist: Nick Sharratt
- Language: English
- Genre: Children's novel
- Publisher: Transworld Publishers Limited; Corgi Yearling
- Publication date: 1995
- Publication place: United Kingdom
- Media type: Print and audiobook
- Pages: 96
- ISBN: 9780440865421
- Followed by: Buried Alive!

Cliffhanger is a children's novel written by Jacqueline Wilson and illustrated by Nick Sharratt, originally published in 1995. Wilson wrote the book after being asked by a producer to write an adventure two-part television series with a boy protagonist, which she was unfamiliar with. After writing the series, Wilson adapted it into a novel. The novel revolves around Tim being forced to go to an adventure holiday despite not wanting to. Cliffhanger was well-received by critics and readers. Wilson later wrote a sequel to the book called Buried Alive!.

== Premise ==
Tim, who is not good at sports, is sent away to an adventure holiday despite telling his father that he will hate it. The camp has various activities, including canoeing, abseiling and a Crazy Bucket Race, and Tim tries to survive the "horrors" of the week and help his team, the Tigers, win.

== Production ==
Cliffhanger was written by Jacqueline Wilson and illustrated by Nick Sharratt. Prior to the book being written, Wilson was contacted by a producer, who wanted to commission her to write a two-part series for Junior School children. Although Wilson was happy about this, the producer wanted the plot to be an "exciting adventure story" and for it to be centred around a boy character. Wilson had mostly written about girls as she found it easier and had never written an adventure story, but she agreed to do it as she wanted to work for television. Wilson ended up writing the story as a novel as well. Wilson enjoyed writing the novel and later decided to write a sequel, Buried Alive!; Biscuits, who Wilson considered her favourite boy character, went on to appear in her 2004 novel Best Friends. Cliffhanger and Buried Alive! are two of Wilson's books that have boys as the protagonists of the story.

Cliffhanger was initially published in 1995 by Transworld Publishers Limited. An updated edition, published in March 2005 by Corgi Yearling (an imprint of Random House), features a foreword by Wilson. Cliffhanger and Buried Alive! are the two books in Wilson's "Biscuit Barrel" collection (in addition to the book Biscuit Barrel, which contains the two novels in one book).

== Reception ==
Miriam Moore from The Spinoff ranked Cliffhanger 14th on her ranked list of the 30 Jacqueline Wilson books that she read, noting that it was unusual for her to rank a novel about a boy highly. Moore noted Tim triumphing with his "brain power" and his "clever use" of a pipe to win the final challenge, calling it "[a] win for the nerds and a win for my heart". A writer from The Good Book Guide called the novel an "excellent, fast-moving story, full of humour for competent readers", whereas a writer for The School Librarian opined that readers who share Tim's "agonies" could "take courage from this entertaining story". A child reviewer from The Guardian called the story a "really funny book that will make you laugh" and recommended it for readers over the age of six. The reviewer revealed that his favourite part of the novel was when Tim's team won due to Tim's idea of pouring the water down the drainpipe. Another writer from The Guardian called the novel "brilliant" and opined that both Cliffhanger and Buried Alive! featured boys who make friends easily, writing, "At the heart of the stories lies the wonderful friendship that is forged between weedy Tim and Biscuits". The writer believed that Biscuits and Tim had little in common and recommended the books to a parent to help their son make friends. The Daily Telegraph praised the novel, writing that it "Weaves plenty of plot strands in a very short space, and leaves us smiling at the end". Ella Dove from Good Housekeeping placed Cliffhanger on her list of the 10 best Jacqueline Wilson books and opined that Cliffhanger had of one of Sharratt's "most iconic cover images". A writer from BookTrust called the novel a "salutary and funny tale about not giving up".
