= Baby Be My Love Song =

Single by Easton Corbin

from the album About to Get Real
- Released: September 8, 2014
- Recorded: 2014
- Genre: Country
- Length: 3:20
- Label: Mercury Nashville
- Songwriter(s): Jim Collins; Brett James
- Producer(s): Carson Chamberlain

Easton Corbin singles chronology
"Clockwork" (2014)	"Baby Be My Love Song" (2014)	"Yup" (2015)

"Baby Be My Love Song" is a song written by Jim Collins and Brett James and recorded by American country music artist Easton Corbin. It was released in September 2014 as the second single from Corbin's album About to Get Real.

== Content ==
When asked about the song, Corbin said "I'm really fired up about this song, to see what it's going to do." He also stated "I think it's a very fresh sound, but it's still country, right down the middle."

== Critical reception ==
Markos Papadatos of Digital Journal gave the song four stars out of five, calling it "an uplifting and infectious country single." Papadatos wrote that Corbin's vocals are "pleasant, refreshing and reminiscent of such country superstars as George Strait and Alan Jackson" and added that Corbin "deserves a great deal of praise for staying humble to his musical roots." The song also received a favorable review from Taste of Country, which declared it "the sort of timeless tune Corbin began his career with." It went on to say "the production of the Florida-born singer's most recent cuts isn't as traditional as 'A Little More Country Than That,' but he'll still draw more comparisons to men like George Strait than he will modern Romeos like Luke Bryan, even if he does drop a Dixie cup reference."

Other reviews were less favorable. Jim Casey of Country Weekly gave the song a "C" and said that it "is as uninspiring as its title suggests. The song is brimming with cringe-worthy lyrics." He also criticized the production and said "sure, there's some steel, but there's also over-the-top electric guitar filler where there should be more steel."

== Commercial performance ==
"Baby Be My Love Song" debuted at number 53 on the U.S. Billboard Country Airplay chart for the week of September 27, 2014. It became Corbin's highest debut to date. The song also debuted at number 41 on the U.S. Billboard Hot Country Songs chart for the week of September 27, 2014. It sold 15,000 downloads in its first week of release. It also debuted at number 18 on the U.S. Billboard Bubbling Under Hot 100 Singles chart for the week of March 21, 2015, then entered the Billboard Hot 100 at No. 99 for chart dated April 25, 2015. The song peaked at No. 56 on the Hot 100, and No. 11 on Hot Country Songs for charts dated July 18, 2015. The song has sold 263,000 copies in the US as of July 2015.

The song debuted at number 99 on the Canadian Hot 100 chart for the week of June 27, 2015. It also debuted at number 50 on the Canada Country chart for the week of March 28, 2015.

== Music videos ==
A live performance video from Yahoo! Ram Country, directed by Steve Angus, premiered in September 2014. The official music video, directed by Shaun Silva, premiered in April 2015. An acoustic music video, directed by Dusty Barker, premiered in June 2015.

== Chart performance ==
Chart (2014–2015)	Peak position
Canada (Canadian Hot 100)	77
Canada Country (Billboard)	5
US Billboard Hot 100	56
US Country Airplay (Billboard)	3
US Hot Country Songs (Billboard)	11

=== Year-end charts ===
Chart (2015)	Position
US Country Airplay (Billboard)	6
US Hot Country Songs (Billboard)	45

== Certifications ==
Region	Certification	Certified units/sales
United States (RIAA)	Gold	500,000^{‡}
^{‡} Sales+streaming figures based on certification alone.
