= Akagündüz =

Akagündüz is a Turkish given name and surname, which may refer to

- Akagündüz Kutbay (1934–1979), Turkish musician
- Muhammet Akagündüz, Turkish-born Austrian footballer
