= Ahmet Ertegun =

Turkish-American businessman (1923–2006)

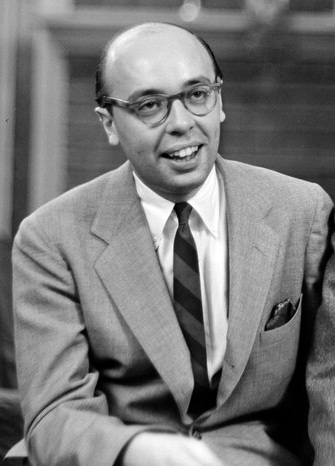
- Ertegun c. 1960

Background information
- Also known as: A. Nugetre
- Born: Ahmet Zahrettin Sebuhi Ertegün; July 31, 1923; Istanbul, State of Turkey
- Origin: Washington, D.C., U.S.
- Died: December 14, 2006 (aged 83) New York City, U.S.
- Genres: Blues; rhythm and blues; rock and roll
- Occupations: Record label executive; record producer; songwriter; composer; philanthropist
- Years active: 1944–2006
- Label: Atlantic

Ahmet Ertegun (/ˈɑːmɛt ˈɛərtəɡən/ AH-met AIR-tə-gən; Turkish: Ahmet Zahrettin Sebuhi Ertegün, pronounced [ahˈmet æɾteˈɟyn]; July 31, 1923 – December 14, 2006) was a Turkish-American businessman, songwriter, record executive and philanthropist.

Ertegun was the co-founder and president of Atlantic Records. He discovered and championed many leading rhythm and blues and rock musicians. Ertegun also wrote classic blues and pop songs. He served as the chairman of the Rock and Roll Hall of Fame and museum, located in Cleveland, Ohio. Ertegun has been described as "one of the most significant figures in the modern recording industry." In 2017 he was inducted into the Rhythm and Blues Music Hall of Fame in recognition of his work in the music business.

Ertegun helped foster ties between the U.S. and Turkey, his birthplace. He served as the chairman of the American Turkish Society for over 20 years until his death. He also co-founded the New York Cosmos soccer team of the original North American Soccer League.

== Background ==
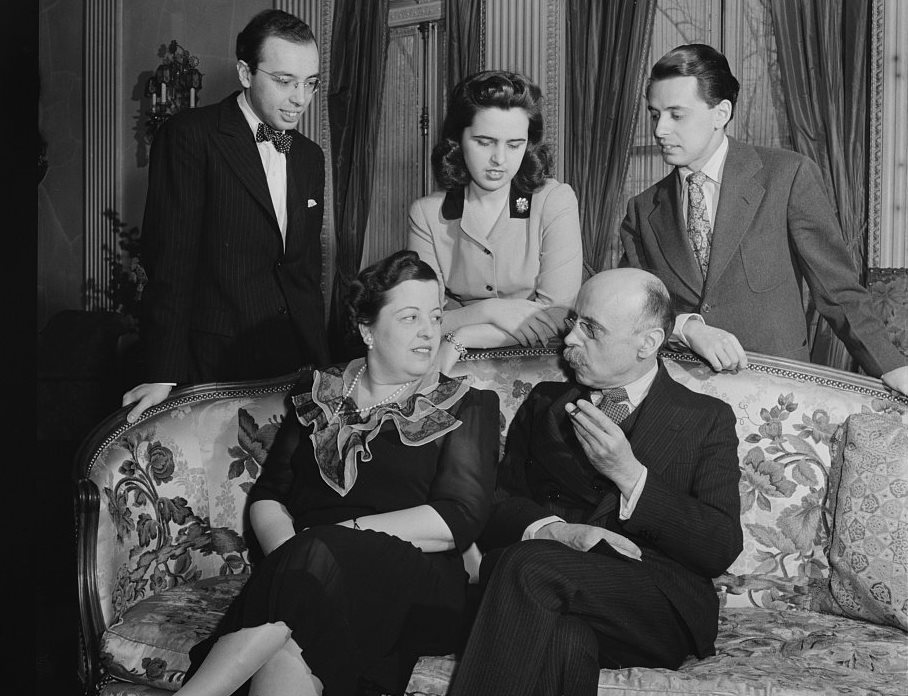
The Ertegun family in 1942, with Ahmet at left

Ahmet Ertegün's great-grandfather, İbrahim Edhem Efendi, was the last sheikh of the Üsküdar Özbekler Tekkesi, a secret base and hospital located in downtown Istanbul, used during Ottoman times and the Turkish War of Independence. He was the second son of Turkish ambassador Münir Ertegün and Hayrünnisa Rüstem. His father, Münir Ertegün, was a statesman who undertook significant duties and services during the National Struggle period. Ertegun was born Ahmet Munir in Istanbul, Turkey, on July 31, 1923. His mother, Hayrünnisa, was an accomplished musician who played keyboard and stringed instruments. She bought the popular records of the day, to which Ahmet and his older brother, Nesuhi, listened. Nesuhi introduced him to jazz music, taking him at the age of nine to see the Duke Ellington and Cab Calloway orchestras in London. In 1935, Ahmet and his family moved to the US with his father who was appointed as the Ambassador of the Republic of Turkey to the United States. When Ahmet was 14, his mother bought him a record-cutting machine, which he used to compose and add lyrics to instrumental records.

Ertegun's love for music attracted him to the heart of Washington, D.C.'s, black district where he would frequently see such top acts as Duke Ellington, Cab Calloway, Billie Holiday and Louis Armstrong. He attended Landon School, an affluent all-male private school in Bethesda, Maryland. Ahmet joked, "I got my real education at the Howard"; Howard being the Howard Theatre, a historic performance space located in Washington, D.C. Despite his affluent upbringing, Ertegun began to see a different world from his wealthy peers. Ertegun would later say: "I began to discover a little bit about the situation of black people in America and experienced immediate empathy with the victims of such senseless discrimination, because, although Turks were never slaves, they were regarded as enemies within Europe because of their Muslim beliefs."

Atlantic Records logo from its inception in 1947 to 1966 (it was still used on 7" single releases), used again from 1979 to 1981 and 2004 to 2015.

Ertegun and his brother frequented Milt Gabler's Commodore Music Shop, assembled a collection of over 15,000 jazz and blues 78s, and became acquainted with musicians such as Ellington, Lena Horne and Jelly Roll Morton. Ahmet and Nesuhi staged concerts by Lester Young, Sidney Bechet and other jazz giants. They also traveled to New Orleans and to Harlem to listen to music and develop a keen awareness of developing musical tastes.

Ertegun graduated from St. John's College in Annapolis in 1944. In November of the same year, Munir Ertegun died. In 1946 President Harry Truman ordered the battleship USS Missouri to return his body to Turkey as a demonstration of friendship between the US and Turkey. This show of support was meant to counter the Soviet Union's potential political demands on Turkey.

At the time of his father's death, Ahmet was taking graduate courses in medieval philosophy at Georgetown University.

Soon afterward, when the rest of the family returned permanently to Turkey, Ahmet and Nesuhi stayed in the United States. While Nesuhi moved to Los Angeles, Ahmet stayed in Washington and decided to get into the record business as a temporary measure to help him through college.

== Early career ==
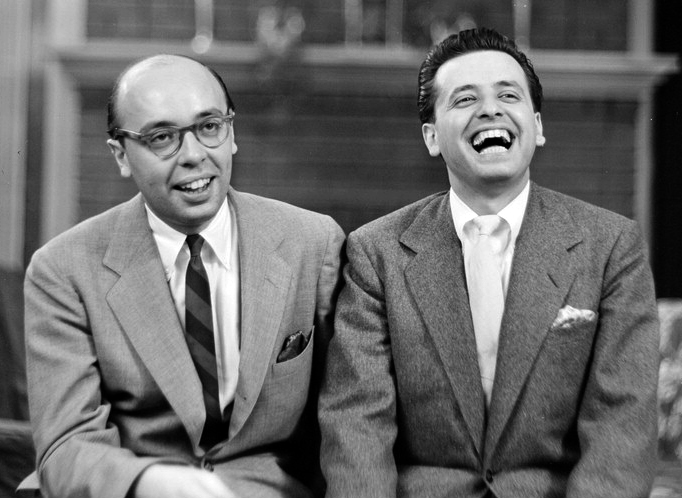
Ahmet (left) with his brother Nesuhi, around 1960

In 1946, Ertegun became friends with Herb Abramson, a dental student and A&R man for National Records, and they decided to start a new independent record label for gospel, jazz, and R&B music. Financed by family dentist Dr. Vahdi Sabit, they formed Atlantic Records in September 1947 in New York City. The first recording sessions took place that November.

In 1949, after 22 unsuccessful record releases, including the first recordings by Professor Longhair, Atlantic had its first major hit with Stick McGhee's "Drinkin' Wine Spo-Dee-O-Dee". The company expanded through the 1950s, with Jerry Wexler and, later, Ertegun's brother Nesuhi on board as partners. Hit artists that recorded on Atlantic included Ruth Brown, Big Joe Turner, The Clovers, The Drifters, The Coasters and Ray Charles.

Like the Erteguns, many independent record executives were from immigrant backgrounds, including the Bihari and the Chess brothers. The Ertegun brothers brought a jazz sensibility (and many jazz artists) into R&B, successfully combining blues and jazz styles from around the country. Atlantic helped challenge the primacy of the major labels of the time by discovering, developing, and nurturing new talent. It became the premier rhythm and blues label in a few years and, with the help of innovative engineer/producer Tom Dowd, set new standards in producing high-quality recordings. Atlantic was among the first labels to record in stereo, and in 1957 was the first record company to utilize an 8-track tape machine.

Ertegun himself wrote a number of classic blues songs, including "Chains of Love" and "Sweet Sixteen", under the pseudonym "A. Nugetre" ("Ertegun" backwards). The songs were given expression first by Big Joe Turner and continued in B.B. King's repertoire. "Chains of Love" was a popular hit for Pat Boone. He also wrote the Ray Charles hit "Mess Around", with lyrics that drew heavily on "Pinetop's Boogie Woogie". He was briefly listed as "Nuggy" in the credits before changing to "A. Nugetre". Ertegun was part of the shouting choral group on Turner's "Shake, Rattle and Roll", along with Wexler and songwriter Jesse Stone. He also wrote "Ting A Ling", a 1956 hit for The Clovers that was covered by Buddy Holly. "Fool, Fool, Fool", another Clovers song was a hit for Kay Starr. His "Don't Play That Song (You Lied)" was recorded by Aretha Franklin, Ben E. King, and in an international version by Adriano Celentano.

The five lines of the lyrics of "Lovey Dovey" by the Clovers were used by Steve Miller in his hit "The Joker". Other Nugetre rhythm and blues hits include "What'cha Gonna Do" by The Drifters, "Wild, Wild Young Men" by Ruth Brown, Ray Charles's "Heartbreaker", "Middle of the Night" by The Clovers, "Ti-Ri-Lee" by Big Joe Turner, and "Story of My Love" by LaVern Baker. All of these were originally recorded for Atlantic Records. He also wrote "Missä Olit Silloin (Dawn in Ankara)" for Finnish singer Irina Milan as Ahmet Ertegun.

In 1958, Ertegun replaced Abramson as Atlantic's president and Abramson left the company after selling his financial interest.

== Marriages ==
On 6 January 1953 Ertegun married Jan Holm (née Enstam), a Swedish-American actress, fashion model, and set designer, who was the daughter of Carl Enstam and the former wife of Walter Butterfield Rathbun. She and Ertegun had no children and divorced in about 1956.

In 1961 he married Ioana Maria "Mica" Grecianu, the former wife of Stefan Grecianu and a daughter of Gheorghe Banu, a Romanian doctor and statesman. Mica later became a well-known interior designer, a co-founder of the decorating firm MAC II. The couple had no children.

== Later career ==
In the 1960s, Atlantic, often in partnerships with local labels such as Stax Records in Memphis, helped to develop the growth of soul music, with artists such as Ben E. King, Solomon Burke, Otis Redding, Sam and Dave, Percy Sledge, Aretha Franklin and Wilson Pickett. Ertegun helped introduce America to The Rascals when he discovered the group at a Westhampton, New York, nightclub in 1965 and signed them to Atlantic. They went on to chart 13 Top 40 singles in four years and were elected to the Rock-n-Roll Hall of Fame in 1997. Ertegun heard Led Zeppelin's demo and was confident they would be successful after hearing the first few songs, and quickly signed them. In the late 1970s, during the disco era, Ertegun contracted producer Silvio Tancredi to Atlantic Records. Atlantic Records also held the rights to recordings by Stephen Stills. After negotiating with David Geffen, who in turn was negotiating with Clive Davis at Columbia Records to transfer the rights to David Crosby and Graham Nash to Atlantic Records, he signed Crosby, Stills and Nash and convinced the trio to allow Neil Young to join them on one of their tours, thereby founding Crosby, Stills, Nash and Young.

Ertegun initially had no desire to sell Atlantic, but his partner Jerry Wexler was nervous about the label's future and after convincing Ertegun's brother Nesuhi of his position, Ertegun eventually conceded and they sold Atlantic to Warner Bros.-Seven Arts in 1967 for $17 million in stock, although Wexler later admitted that, because of assets including the rights to the Woodstock film and the accompanying record, the deal paid them less than half of what the label was actually worth. Wexler had seen the other 1950s independent record labels disappear with the waning popularity of rhythm and blues, and said only Ertegun's foresightful adaptation of signing white rock musicians turned out to be the basis of Atlantic's continued success. Four years later, the Ertegun brothers took some of the money and co-founded the New York Cosmos Association football team of the North American Soccer League. They were instrumental in bringing famous players such as Pelé, Carlos Alberto and Franz Beckenbauer to the club.

When Atlantic became part of the Kinney conglomerate in 1969, and later part of Time Warner, Atlantic Records continued with Ertegun at the helm, and although he was less directly involved as a producer, he wielded considerable influence in the new conglomerate. He continued to produce some rock acts, such as Dr. John and The Honeydrippers. He also used his considerable personal skills in negotiations with major stars, such as when The Rolling Stones were shopping for a record company to distribute their independent Rolling Stones Records label. Ertegun personally conducted the negotiations with Mick Jagger, successfully completing the deal between the Stones and Atlantic, when other labels had actually offered the band more money. He took a personal interest in the progressive rock band Yes, and took a strong stand with bassist Chris Squire on the direction of the 90125 album. He encouraged Squire and the group to make sure the album produced a hit single, which it did with "Owner of a Lonely Heart".

In 1987 Ertegun was inducted into the Rock & Roll Hall of Fame, of which he himself was a founder. In the late 1980s, with the support of Bonnie Raitt and others, he provided $1.5 million to help establish the Rhythm and Blues Foundation to award money to underpaid blues artists. The Foundation's establishment arose from a lengthy battle by Ruth Brown and other Atlantic artists to obtain unpaid past royalties from the company; other record companies later also contributed. Among early recipients of payments were John Lee Hooker, Bo Diddley, Johnny "Guitar" Watson, Ruth Brown and the Staple Singers. In 1988, he received the Golden Plate Award of the American Academy of Achievement.

Ertegun received an honorary doctorate in music from the Berklee College of Music in Boston in 1991, and was awarded the Grammy Trustees Award for his lifetime achievements in 1993. At the tenth annual Rock and Roll Hall of Fame Induction Dinner in 1995, it was announced that the museum's main exhibition hall would be named after him. In 1998, Ertegun was honoured Man of the Year at Midem.

The United States Library of Congress honored Ertegun as a Living Legend in 2000. With brother Nesuhi, he was inducted into the National Soccer Hall of Fame in 2003. In 2005, the National Academy of Recording Arts and Sciences presented Ertegun with the first "President's Merit Award Salute To Industry Icons". He was also a recipient of The International Center in New York's Award of Excellence.

Ertegun is interviewed on screen in the 2005 documentary film Make It Funky!, which presents a history of New Orleans music and its influence on rhythm and blues, rock and roll, funk and jazz.

Ertegun approved the recording and release of Music of the Whirling Dervishes, featuring ayin singer Kâni Karaca and ney player Akagündüz Kutbay on the Atlantic label.

== Philanthropy ==
In addition to being a seminal figure in the history of popular music, Ertegun was also a prominent philanthropist dedicated to enhancing relations and cultural understanding between the United States and his native country, Turkey. As the chairman of The American Turkish Society, he introduced numerous American dignitaries, business leaders, investors, and artists to Turkey and garnered U.S. support for Turkey. Following the devastating earthquake near Istanbul in 1999, Ertegun was instrumental in the success of the Society's Earthquake Relief Fund, which raised over $4 million for Turkey's rebuilding efforts, particularly in education.

In addition to his endeavors at The American Turkish Society, Ertegun funded the Turkish studies departments at Princeton and Georgetown universities. In 2008, the Ahmet Ertegun Memorial Scholarship, established by the American Turkish Society, was officially announced and designated for music students of Turkish descent to study at the Juilliard School.

== Death ==
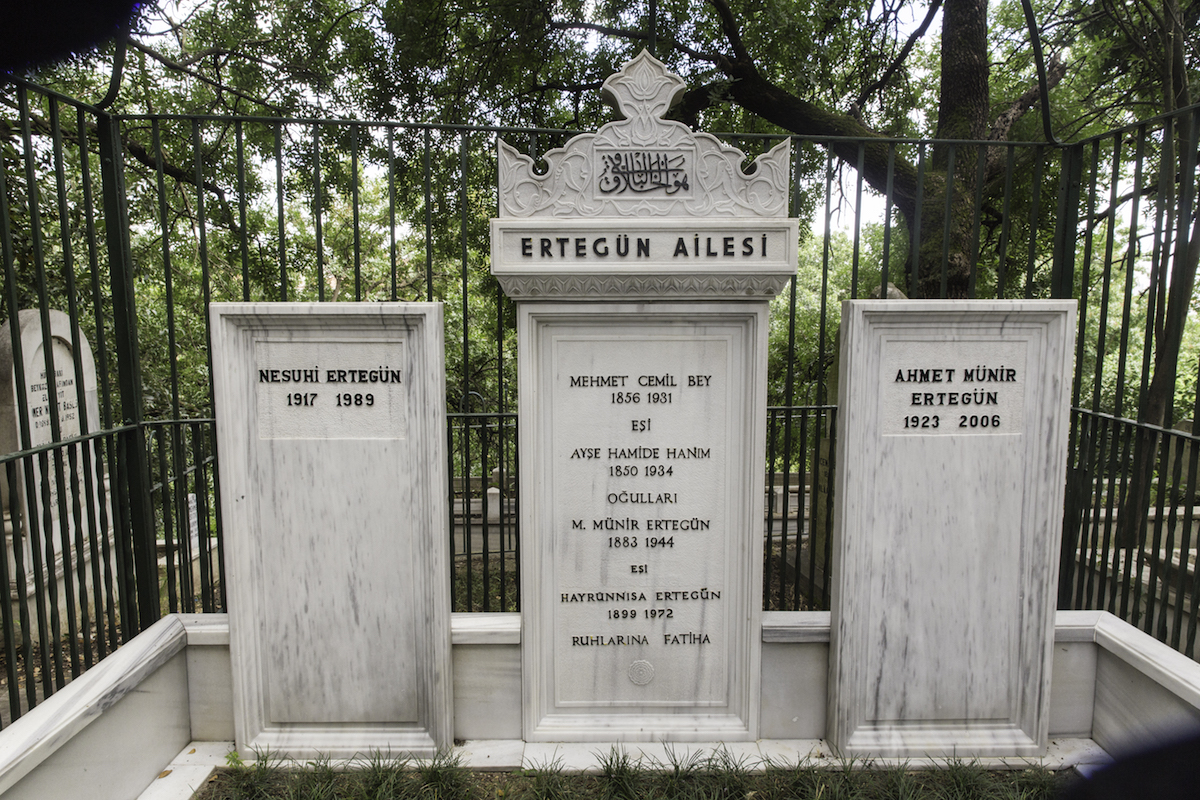
Gravesite of Ahmet Ertegun and family

On October 29, 2006, Ertegun tripped, striking his head on a concrete floor during a Rolling Stones concert at the Beacon Theatre. He was immediately hospitalized. Ertegun fell into a coma and died on December 14, 2006, at Weill Cornell Medical Center.

Ertegun was buried December 18 in the Garden of Sufi Tekke, Özbekler Tekkesi in Sultantepe, Üsküdar, Istanbul next to his brother, his father and his sheikh great-grandfather Şeyh İbrahim Edhem Efendi, who was once the head of the tekke in his native Turkey.

== Memorial events ==
A memorial service for Ertegun was held in New York on April 17, 2007. A large part of the evening was given over to musical performances. Wynton Marsalis opened the tribute with the jazz standard "Didn't He Ramble", Eric Clapton and Dr. John performed "Drinkin' Wine Spo-Dee-O-Dee", and other performers included Solomon Burke, Ben E. King, Sam Moore, Stevie Nicks, Crosby, Stills, Nash & Young, and Phil Collins.

Another informal salute to him took place in Los Angeles on July 31, 2007, the anniversary of his birth. The tribute took place at Grauman's Egyptian Theatre in Hollywood. Several of his friends shared anecdotes about their experiences with him and the assembled gathering then saw a special screening of the American Masters documentary Atlantic Records: The House That Ahmet Built. Among those who paid tribute to Ertegun in person were: Solomon Burke, Jerry Leiber & Mike Stoller, Keith Emerson, Peter Asher, Spencer Davis, the film's producer (and longtime friend) Phil Carson, Taylor Hackford, and event producer Martin Lewis.

The Martin Scorsese film Shine a Light, about The Rolling Stones' concert at the Beacon Theatre in New York at which Ertegun sustained the injury that ultimately ended his life, contains a dedication to Ertegun. Andrea Corr's solo album Ten Feet High is also dedicated "To the memory of Ahmet Ertegun".

In honor of the barriers the Ertegun brothers broke during their time in segregated Washington, the Turkish Ambassador to the U.S., Namik Tan, hosted a series of jazz concerts at the historical residence on Sheridan Circle in Washington, D.C. The "Ertegun Jazz Series," in collaboration with Jazz at Lincoln Center, reviving the brothers' legacy of bridging cultures and bringing people together with one common objective: celebrating music. In that same spirit, Ambassador Tan opened the doors of his home to residents of D.C. from various backgrounds – Members of Congress, Administration officials, academia, the media, business leaders, and others.

=== Tribute concert ===
A benefit concert held in Ertegün's memory took place on 10 December 2007 at the O2 Arena in London. The headline act was the English rock band Led Zeppelin, who performed their first full-length concert in almost three decades, since the death of drummer John Bonham in 1980, in a one-off reunion. Bonham's son Jason Bonham played drums during the band's set, and he also sang backing vocals on two songs.

The concert also included Paolo Nutini, Mick Jones of Foreigner and Bill Wyman's Rhythm Kings who supported their acts, and additionally shared the stage with them. The show was held to raise money for the Ahmet Ertegun Education Fund, which pays for university scholarships in the UK, US and Turkey. The show had been scheduled for late November but was postponed by two weeks because Jimmy Page fractured a finger.

=== Art collection ===
Ertegun's collection of modernist works is now housed at The Baker Museum in Naples, Florida. The collection includes works by Oscar Bluemner, Thomas Hart Benton, Stuart Davis, Werner Drewes, John Ferren, Ilya Bolotowsky, and Albert Swinden; Ertegun's alma mater, St. John's College, presented an exhibition of works from this collection in 2015.

== In popular culture ==
Ertegun has been represented several times in popular culture. In Ray, the biopic of Ray Charles, he is portrayed by Curtis Armstrong. In Beyond the Sea, the biopic about Bobby Darin, he is played by Tayfun Bademsoy. He appeared as an interview subject in the documentary film "Blind Willie's Blues" (1997 and 2023).

== Controversies ==
=== Views on the Armenian Genocide ===
Musician Serj Tankian (from System of a Down) has claimed that Ertegun was against recognising the Armenian Genocide in line with the official policy of Turkey, Ertegun's home country.

In December 2006 (shortly after Ertegun's death), Harut Sassounian, an Armenian-American writer and contributor for The Huffington Post, published an op-ed in which he claims that he had talked with Ertegun, and that Ertegun did acknowledge the Armenian Genocide, and he even wished to speak publicly about it; according to Sassounian, Ertegun "firmly believed that once Ankara put the issue of the Genocide behind it, the country would attain the respect of the international community and would not waste its efforts and resources to counter Armenian efforts for Genocide recognition". The writer ends his piece by explaining: "I could not write this column while he [Ertegun] was alive, since I did not want him to become the target of hate mails and threats from Turkish extremists by alerting them that he was considering the possibility of issuing a public statement on the Armenian Genocide. Alas, he passed away without being able to do so, which is a great loss for both Armenians and Turks. I hasten to add that it is a greater loss for Turkey. Ertegun believed that by acknowledging the Genocide, Turkey would earn many political dividends and lose practically nothing!"

=== 2017 sexual harassment/assault allegation ===
In 2017, music executive Dorothy Carvello alleged that Ertegun tried to remove her underwear and groped her under her shirt at a public event in 1987. Her book Anything for a Hit tells of her experiences.
