= Buried Alive! =

1998 novel by Jacqueline Wilson

- Author: Jacqueline Wilson
- Illustrator: Nick Sharratt and Sue Heap
- Language: English
- Genre: Children's novel
- Publisher: Corgi Yearling
- Publication date: 4 June 1998
- Publication place: United Kingdom
- Media type: Print (hardback, Ebook & paperback) and audiobook
- Pages: 160
- ISBN: 978-0440868569
- Preceded by: Cliffhanger

Buried Alive! is a children's novel written by British author Jacqueline Wilson and illustrated by British illustrators Nick Sharratt and Sue Heap. It is a sequel to Wilson's Cliffhanger. The novel revolves around Tim going on holiday with his best friend Biscuit and his girlfriend Kelly, where they encounter two bullies who threaten their fun. The novel received generally positive reviews from critics.

== Premise ==
Tim is excited to go on holiday to Wales with his friend Biscuit; however, their fun is disrupted by two bullies, Prickle-Head and Pinch-Face. Tim also faces challenges from his mother's overprotectiveness and tries to keep the peace between Biscuit and Kelly, Tim's girlfriend.

== Publication ==
Buried Alive! was written by Jacqueline Wilson and illustrated by Nick Sharratt and Sue Heap. It is the sequel to Wilson's Cliffhanger, with the pair being the two books in Wilson's "Biscuit Barrel" collection (in addition to the book Biscuit Barrel, which contains the two novels in one book). Buried Alive! was first published in hardcover in 1998 by Doubleday Children's Books. An updated version of the paperback edition was released in March 2009. This version consists of 160 pages. Cliffhanger and Buried Alive! are two of Wilson's books that have boys as the protagonists of the story. The book switches perspective between diary entries written by Tim and entries written by Biscuit. The novel includes themes such as friendship and bullying. The novel also includes recipes for biscuits. In 1998, the Grimsby Telegraph held a competition for readers to win a copy of the novel. Wilson said that enjoyed writing the diary entries at the beginning of each chapter, especially Biscuits' entries as they included lists of things that he would eat. Wilson believed that Biscuits was her favourite male character that she created and he would later feature in another one of Wilson's books, Best Friends. As Buried Alive is set during a holiday at the seaside, writing the novel reminded Wilson of holidays that she took with her daughter in Wales. In 2009, a new edition of the novel was published, which includes a Foreword by Wilson.

== Reception ==
Miriam Moore from The Spinoff wrote that the novel was her second least favourite of Wilson's books that she read, writing, "I don't remember it like I remember Cliffhanger, so I assume it was only OK". A reviewer from The Guardian opined that the book was very "enjoyable" due to having comedic bits, "especially when Biscuit always talks and thinks about food", and recommended the book for readers aged seven and over. Another writer from The Guardian called the novel the "equally fabulous sequel" of Cliffhanger and opined that both books featured boys who make friends easily, writing, "At the heart of the stories lies the wonderful friendship that is forged between weedy Tim and Biscuits". The writer believed that Biscuits and Tim had little in common and recommended the books to a parent to help their son make friends. Susie Maguire from Scotland on Sunday called the book a "funny novel about the importance of friendships and the embarrassment of having parents". Maguire opined that Tim had shown himself to be "Super-Tim" when the "tables [were] turned" on his bullies. Kate Ribey from the Grimsby Telegraph thought that the diary extracts in the book were amusing and called the book "long" but "jam packed full of crazy cartoons". Ribey called the book "every inch as exciting as it sounds" and believed that it was a "must" for readers interested in "action, adventure and girl-power".
