= All Over the Road =

Studio album by Easton Corbin
- Released: September 18, 2012
- Recorded: 2011–12
- Genre: Neotraditional country
- Length: 38:46
- Label: Mercury Nashville
- Producer: Carson Chamberlain

Easton Corbin chronology
Easton Corbin (2010)	All Over the Road (2012)	About to Get Real (2015)

Singles from All Over the Road
- 1. "Lovin' You Is Fun" Released: February 27, 2012; 2. "All Over the Road" Released: January 14, 2013

Professional ratings
Review scores
Source	Rating
AllMusic	3.5/5 stars

All Over the Road is the second studio album by American country music artist Easton Corbin. It was released on September 18, 2012, via Mercury Nashville. The album's first single, "Lovin' You Is Fun," hit the top 10 on the Billboard Hot Country Songs chart.

The album's track listing was announced on July 17.

The album debuted at No. 2 on Top Country Albums, and No. 11 on Billboard 200, selling 29,000 copies in the United States in its first week. As of June 2015, the album has sold 177,000 copies in the United States.

== Track listing ==
No.	Title	Writer(s)	Length
1.	"All Over the Road"	Carson Chamberlain; Ashley Gorley; Wade Kirby	2:43
2.	"Lovin' You Is Fun"	Jim Beavers; Bob DiPiero	3:20
3.	"That's Gonna Leave a Memory"	Tony Martin; Mark Nesler; Roger Springer	3:07
4.	"Hearts Drawn in the Sand"	Michael White; Jason Saenz	3:10
5.	"Dance Real Slow"	Chamberlain; Gorley; Kirby	3:43
6.	"A Thing for You"	Easton Corbin; Chamberlain; Tony Lane	2:54
7.	"Are You with Me"	Tommy Lee James; Terry McBride; Shane McAnally	3:40
8.	"This Feels a Lot Like Love"	Corbin; Chamberlain; Mark D. Sanders	3:43
9.	"Only a Girl"	Chamberlain; Kirby; Wil Nance	2:42
10.	"Tulsa, Texas"	T. Lane; Mike Lane; David Lee	4:34
11.	"I Think of You"	Thom Shepherd; Jeff Silvey	5:05

== Personnel ==
- Eddie Bayers – drums
- Easton Corbin – lead vocals
- Larry Franklin – fiddle
- Paul Franklin – steel guitar
- Brent Mason – electric guitar
- James Mitchell – electric guitar
- Gary Prim – keyboards, piano, Wurlitzer
- John Wesley Ryles – background vocals
- W. David Smith – bass guitar
- Biff Watson – acoustic guitar
- Glenn Worf – bass guitar

== Chart performance ==
=== Weekly charts ===
Chart (2012)	Peak position
US Billboard 200	11
US Top Country Albums (Billboard)	2

=== Year-end charts ===
Chart (2012)	Position
US Top Country Albums (Billboard)	65
Chart (2013)	Position
US Top Country Albums (Billboard)	50

=== Singles ===
Year	Single	Peak chart positions				
Year	Single	US Country	US Country Airplay	US	CAN Country	CAN
2012	"Lovin' You Is Fun"	7	5	57	—	87
2013	"All Over the Road"	9	3	51	12	78
"—" denotes releases that did not chart
