= About to Get Real =

Studio album by Easton Corbin
- Released: June 30, 2015
- Recorded: 2013–15
- Genre: Neotraditional country
- Label: Mercury Nashville
- Producer: Carson Chamberlain

Easton Corbin chronology
All Over the Road (2012)	About to Get Real (2015)	Let’s Do Country Right (2023)

Singles from About to Get Real
- 1. "Clockwork" Released: January 28, 2014; 2. "Baby Be My Love Song" Released: September 8, 2014; 3. "Yup" Released: July 27, 2015; 4. "Are You with Me" Released: May 23, 2016

Professional ratings
Review scores
Source	Rating
AllMusic	3.5/5 stars

About to Get Real is the third studio album by American country music artist Easton Corbin. It was released on June 30, 2015 via Mercury Nashville. It includes the singles "Clockwork", "Baby Be My Love Song". and "Yup". It also includes "Are You with Me" from Corbin's previous album, All Over the Road. The album was produced by Carson Chamberlain.

== Content ==
About the album, Corbin said, "When deciding on an album title, About to Get Real just says it all for me. When country fans listen to this album, I want them to take away that even though the music mixes the modern with the classic, it's entirely real. Like the music of my heroes, it's the real deal." The album's track listing was announced on June 9.

== Critical reception ==
Stephen Thomas Erlewine of AllMusic gave the album 3.5 stars out of 5 and wrote that "No matter what the album title implies – "real" usually conveys grit, a quality conspicuously absent from these 12 songs – About to Get Real is so smooth it sometimes suggests the glory days of Urban Cowboy, when modern country flirted heavily with the soft rock mainstream."

== Commercial performance ==
The album debuted at No. 1 on the Top Country Albums chart, and No. 13 on the Billboard 200, with 20,000 copies sold in the US in its first week. The album has sold 59,800 copies in the US as of May 2016.

== Track listing ==
No.	Title	Writer(s)	Length
1.	"Kiss Me One More Time"	Carson Chamberlain; Wade Kirby; Phil O'Donnell	3:20
2.	"Guys and Girls"	Zach Crowell; Jaren Johnston; Cary Barlowe	3:48
3.	"Clockwork"	Chamberlain; Kirby; Ashley Gorley	3:09
4.	"Diggin' on You"	Easton Corbin; Chamberlain; O'Donnell; Kirby	2:42
5.	"Baby Be My Love Song"	Jim Collins; Brett James	3:21
6.	"About to Get Real"	Jeremy Stover; Ben Hayslip; Rhett Akins	3:15
7.	"Yup"	Shane Minor; O'Donnell; Kirby	3:13
8.	"Wild Women and Whiskey"	Ronnie Dunn; Terry McBride	3:32
9.	"Are You with Me"	Tommy Lee James; McBride; Shane McAnally	3:40
10.	"Damn Girl"	Corbin; Chamberlain; Jeff Hyde	3:28
11.	"Just Add Water"	Tony Lane; David Lee	3:04
12.	"Like a Song"	Corbin; Chamberlain; Stephen Allen Davis	3:48

== Personnel ==
- Eddie Bayers – drums
- Jimmy Carter – bass guitar
- Easton Corbin – lead vocals
- J.T. Corenflos – electric guitar, resonator guitar
- Larry Franklin – fiddle
- Paul Franklin – steel guitar
- Brent Mason – electric guitar
- Gary Prim – Hammond B-3 organ, keyboards, piano, Wurlitzer
- John Wesley Ryles – background vocals
- W. David Smith – bass guitar
- Russell Terrell – background vocals
- Biff Watson – banjo, bouzouki, acoustic guitar
- Glenn Worf – bass guitar

== Chart performance ==
=== Weekly charts ===
Chart (2015)	Peak position
US Billboard 200	13
US Top Country Albums (Billboard)	1

=== Year-end charts ===
Chart (2015)	Position
US Top Country Albums (Billboard)	45

=== Singles ===
Year	Single	Peak chart positions				
Year	Single	US Country	US Country Airplay	US	CAN Country	CAN
2014	"Clockwork"	31	32	124	—	—
2014	"Baby Be My Love Song"	11	3	56	5	77
2015	"Yup"	44	35	—	—	—
2016	"Are You with Me"	46	41	—	—	—
"—" denotes releases that did not chart
