= Archer/Park =

Former American country music duo

- Randy Archer (left) and Johnny Park

Background information
- Origin: Nashville, Tennessee, U.S.
- Genres: Country
- Years active: 1994
- Label: Atlantic
- Spinoffs: The Parks
- Past members: Randy Archer; Johnny Park

Archer/Park was an American country music duo composed of singer-songwriters Randy Archer and Johnny Park. Signed to Atlantic Records in 1994, the duo released its sole album, We Got a Lot in Common, that year. Two of the album's singles entered the Billboard Hot Country Singles & Tracks charts: "Where There's Smoke" at No. 29 and the title track at No. 63.

== Biography ==
Archer/Park consisted of songwriters and vocalists Randy Archer (born February 20, 1959, in Swainsboro, Georgia) and Johnny Park (born October 30, 1957, in Arlington, Texas). The two had success writing songs for other country music artists, and began working together in the same publishing company. As a result, they decided to form a duo and signed with Atlantic Records' Nashville branch in 1994. They recorded their debut album We Got a Lot in Common that same year. The album's two singles "Where There's Smoke" and "We Got a Lot in Common" both charted on Billboard Hot Country Songs. The album received a mixed review from John P. McLaughlin of the Alberta Province, who thought the album was "generic" and derivative of Brooks & Dunn. An uncredited review in Gavin Report described the title track favorably, saying that the duo showed a sense of humor on it.

After their only album, Archer resumed working as a songwriter, with Tim McGraw and John Michael Montgomery being among the acts who recorded his songs. He and Park also wrote songs for Montgomery and for Elbert West. In 2006, Archer independently released an album titled Shots in the Dark.

In 2009, Park and his son, Clint, formed the duo The Parks, which signed to Lyric Street Records subsidiary Carolwood Records. Park also co-wrote Easton Corbin's "Roll with It".

== We Got a Lot in Common ==
We Got a Lot in Common

Studio album by Archer/Park
- Released: September 6, 1994
- Genre: Country
- Length: 32:04
- Label: Atlantic
- Producer: Randy Scruggs

=== Track listing ===
1. "We Got a Lot in Common" (Randy Archer, Johnny Park, Bobby P. Barker) – 3:07
2. "Where There's Smoke" (Barker, Mark Collie) – 2:54
3. "You Don't Know Where This Heart's Been" (Archer, Park, Barker) – 3:59
4. "I'm Not Crazy" (Archer, Park, Barker) – 2:55
5. "Your Ol' Rock" (Archer, Park, Barker, Doug Nichols) – 3:33
6. "The Man That I Am" (Walt Aldridge, Darryl Worley) – 2:56
7. "Don't Look Now" (Archer, Park, Nichols) – 2:48
8. "'Til Something Better Comes Along" (Charles Quillen) – 3:29
9. "Permanent Thing" (Jerry Abbott, Charles Stewart) – 3:19
10. "I Still Wanna Jump Your Bones" (Archer, Park, Barker) – 3:04

=== Personnel ===
- Eddie Bayers – drums
- Mark Casstevens – acoustic guitar
- Paul Franklin – pedal steel guitar, slide guitar, Pedabro
- Steve Gibson – electric guitar
- Tim "Felipe" Gonzalez – harmonica
- Rob Hajacos – fiddle
- Owen Hale – drums
- Brent Mason – electric guitar
- Dave Pomeroy – bass guitar
- Don Potter – acoustic guitar
- Ron "Snake" Reynolds – percussion
- Randy Scruggs – acoustic and electric guitars
- Milton Sledge – drums
- Bobby Wood – piano, synthesizer
- Bob Wray – bass guitar

=== Singles ===
Year	Single	Peak chart positions	
Year	Single	US Country	CAN Country
1994	"Where There's Smoke"	29	50
1994	"We Got a Lot in Common"	63	68

=== Music videos ===
Year	Video
1994	"Where There's Smoke"
1994	"We Got a Lot in Common"
