= Clockwork (Easton Corbin song) =

Single by Easton Corbin

from the album About to Get Real
- Released: January 28, 2014
- Recorded: 2013–14
- Genre: Country
- Length: 3:08
- Label: Mercury Nashville
- Songwriters: Carson Chamberlain; Ashley Gorley; Wade Kirby
- Producer: Carson Chamberlain

Easton Corbin singles chronology
"All Over the Road" (2013)	"Clockwork" (2014)	"Baby Be My Love Song" (2014)

"Clockwork" is a song written by Carson Chamberlain, Ashley Gorley, and Wade Kirby and recorded by American country music artist Easton Corbin. It was released in January 2014 as the lead single from Corbin's album About to Get Real. The same three writers of this song (Wade Kirby, Carson Chamberlain, and Ashley Gorley) are the same team behind his previous Top 5 hit "All Over the Road".

== Content ==
When asked about the song Corbin stated, “I’m very, VERY excited to have new music out now for my fans. I’m excited especially to release a song like ‘Clockwork...’‘Clockwork’ is a good reflection of my country roots and it shows that I’m growing as an artist. I think when my fans hear this song they will get a good taste of how my upcoming album is going to be.”

== Critical reception ==
Matt Bjorke of Roughstock rated Clockwork 3.5 stars. He states, "as far as lead singles from upcoming albums go, “Clockwork” is the kind of song which SHOULD do well at radio. It has the contemporary melody —there’s even audible steel guitar fills — and a solid vocal from Easton Corbin."

== Music video ==
The music video was directed by Shaun Silva and premiered in April 2014. It shows Corbin driving his truck through Downtown Nashville one night to get home to his lover, who is there and misses him. Once he does, they are seen having sex together in bed. However outside, another woman (Corbin's real lover) is seen walking home to see him. Corbin and the first woman are then seen at a bar (a prequel to the earlier scene) before in the end, she ends up leaving just as the other woman is coming in. The second woman arrives on the elevator, only to be greeted by the first woman. After glancing eyes, the second woman leaves immediately, leaving Corbin (who is seen throughout performing the song while sitting on a couch) shameful.

== Chart performance ==
The song entered the Hot Country Songs chart at No. 41 on its week of release (chart week February 15, 2014). It also appeared on the Country Airplay chart at No. 54 the same week. The song has sold 108,000 copies in the U.S. as of June 2014. It also debuted at number 24 on the U.S. Billboard Bubbling Under Hot 100 Singles chart for the week of July 12, 2014. On the week of July 19, 2014, it peaked at number 32 on Country Airplay chart, becoming Corbin's first single to miss the top 30.

Chart (2014)	Peak position
US Bubbling Under Hot 100 (Billboard)	24
US Country Airplay (Billboard)	32
US Hot Country Songs (Billboard)	31

=== Year-end charts ===
Chart (2014)	Position
US Hot Country Songs (Billboard)	98
