= A Girl Like You (Easton Corbin song) =

Single by Easton Corbin
- Released: January 30, 2017
- Genre: Country
- Length: 3:37
- Label: Mercury Nashville
- Songwriters: Ashley Gorley; Jesse Frasure; Rhett Akins
- Producers: Ashley Gorley; Wade Kirby

Easton Corbin singles chronology
"Are You with Me" (2016)	"A Girl Like You" (2017)	"Somebody's Gotta Be Country" (2019)

"A Girl Like You" is a song written by Ashley Gorley, Jesse Frasure, and Rhett Akins and recorded by American country music singer Easton Corbin. The song is Corbin's tenth single, and was originally intended to be the lead single from his upcoming fourth studio album before his termination from Mercury Nashville.

== Content ==
The song features "a playful, chicken-picked guitar hook and a digitized, shuffling beat". Its lyrics deal with a woman with whom the narrator is affectionate. He compares her to "the nameless girl of many a recent Nashville hit", and states that she is unlike any other girl.

== Commercial performance ==
The song has sold 150,000 copies in the United States as of February 2022.

== Charts ==
=== Weekly charts ===
Chart (2017–2018)	Peak position
US Billboard Hot 100	98
US Country Airplay (Billboard)	6
US Hot Country Songs (Billboard)	15

=== Year-end charts ===
Chart (2017)	Position
US Hot Country Songs (Billboard)	67

Chart (2018)	Position
US Country Airplay (Billboard)	53
US Hot Country Songs (Billboard)	74

== Certifications ==
Region	Certification	Certified units/sales
United States (RIAA)	Gold	500,000^{‡}
^{‡} Sales+streaming figures based on certification alone.
