= Are You with Me =

Country single by Easton Corbin

Single by Easton Corbin

from the album About to Get Real
- Released: May 23, 2016
- Genre: Country
- Length: 3:40 (album version); 3:26 (radio mix)
- Label: Mercury Nashville (Universal)
- Songwriters: Tommy Lee James; Terry McBride; Shane McAnally
- Producer: Carson Chamberlain

Easton Corbin singles chronology
"Yup" (2015)	"Are You with Me" (2016)	"A Girl Like You" (2017)

Music video
- "Are You with Me" on YouTube

"Are You with Me" is a song by American country singer Easton Corbin. The song first appeared on Corbin's second studio album, All Over the Road (2012). It was later included on Corbin's third studio album, About to Get Real (2015). A remix by Belgian DJ Lost Frequencies was released in 2014, and in 2016 Corbin released the version from About to Get Real as a single of his own.

== Background and writing ==
The song was written on May 4, 2011, at Terry McBride's cabin in Franklin, Tennessee.

== Chart performance ==
Reaching a peak of number 41 on the Billboard Country Airplay charts, "Are You with Me" became Corbin's first single to miss the top 40 and his lowest-peaking release to date. It has sold 101,000 copies in the United States as of August 2016.

Chart (2016)	Peak position
US Hot Country Songs (Billboard)	46
US Country Airplay (Billboard)	41

== Lost Frequencies version ==
"Are You with Me"

Single by Lost Frequencies

from the album Less Is More
- Released: 24 October 2014
- Recorded: 2014
- Genre: Deep house; soft rock; tropical house
- Length: 2:18
- Label: The Bearded Man; Armada
- Songwriters: Tommy Lee James; Terry McBride; Shane McAnally
- Producer: Lost Frequencies

Lost Frequencies singles chronology
"Are You with Me" (2014)	"Reality" (2015)

Audio sample
- file; help

Music video
- "Are You with Me" on YouTube

In 2014, Belgian DJ and record producer Lost Frequencies took the music and the refrain from the song, speeding up the track and releasing it in October 2014 as a remix. The song reached number one on Belgium's Ultratop Flanders chart and peaked at number two on Belgium's Wallonia francophone chart. In July 2015, the single topped the charts in the United Kingdom, making Lost Frequencies the first Belgian artist to top the UK Singles Chart and the single with the shortest duration at the top of the chart due to the chart week in the United Kingdom changing from Sunday–Saturday to Friday–Thursday. The song also topped the charts in other countries, including Germany, Ireland, Switzerland, Australia and Austria.

=== Formats and track listings ===
- Digital download – Radio edit
1. "Are You with Me" (radio edit) – 2:18
- Digital download – Remixes
1. "Are You with Me" (Kungs Radio Edit) – 3:08
2. "Are You with Me" (Kungs Remix) – 3:54
3. "Are You with Me" (Funk D Radio Edit) – 3:30
4. "Are You with Me" (Funk D Remix) – 4:02
5. "Are You with Me" (Harold van Lennep Piano Edit) – 2:56
6. "Are You with Me" (Dash Berlin Remix) – 4:50
- Beatport download – Remixes (The Bearded Man)
1. "Are You with Me" (Kungs Remix) – 3:54
2. "Are You with Me" (Harold van Lennep Piano Edit) – 2:56
- Beatport download – Remixes (Armada Music)
1. "Are You with Me" (DIMARO Remix) – 4:22
2. "Are You with Me" (Funk D Remix) – 4:02
- Beatport download – Remixes (Armada Deep)
1. "Are You with Me" (Pretty Pink Remix) – 7:01
2. "Are You with Me" (Gianni Kosta Remix) – 4:40
- Beatport download – Dash Berlin Remix (Armada Trice and Ultra Music)
1. "Are You with Me" (Dash Berlin Remix) – 4:49
- Beatport download – Remixes Two (The Bearded Man)
1. "Are You with Me" (DJ Fresh Remix) – 4:39
2. "Are You with Me" (Calvo Remix) – 4:36
3. "Are You with Me" (Tom Budin Remix) – 4:05
4. "Are You with Me" (Mandel and Forbes Sunset Remix) – 7:32
5. "Are You with Me" (Glover Remix) – 4:31
6. "Are You with Me" (Monarchs Remix) – 3:55
7. "Are You with Me" (Freejak Remix) – 4:59
8. "Are You with Me" ('86 Club Mix) – 5:41
9. "Are You with Me" (Gestort Aber Geil Remix) – 5:16
10. "Are You with Me" (DBN Remix) – 5:16
11. "Are You with Me" (Cropper Remix) – 6:19

=== Charts ===
==== Weekly charts ====
Chart (2014–2018)	Peak position
Australia (ARIA)	1
Austria (Ö3 Austria Top 40)	1
Belarus Airplay (Eurofest)	77
Belgium (Ultratop 50 Flanders)	1
Belgium (Ultratop 50 Wallonia)	2
Canada Hot 100 (Billboard)	42
Canada AC (Billboard)	41
Canada CHR/Top 40 (Billboard)	49
Czech Republic Airplay (ČNS IFPI)	1
Czech Republic Singles Digital (ČNS IFPI)	6
Denmark (Tracklisten)	4
Euro Digital Song Sales (Billboard)	1
Finland (Suomen virallinen lista)	3
France (SNEP)	4
Germany (GfK)	1
Greece Digital Songs (Billboard)	1
Hungary (Dance Top 40)	9
Hungary (Rádiós Top 40)	2
Hungary (Single Top 40)	2
Hungary (Stream Top 40)	3
Ireland (IRMA)	1
Israel International Airplay (Media Forest)	1
Italy (FIMI)	13
Lebanon Airplay (Lebanese Top 20)	1
Netherlands (Dutch Top 40)	4
Netherlands (Single Top 100)	3
New Zealand (Recorded Music NZ)	9
Norway (VG-lista)	4
Poland Airplay (ZPAV)	1
Romania (Airplay 100)	1
Romania TV Airplay (Media Forest)	1
Russia (NFPF)	7
Scottish Singles Sales (Official Charts)	1
Slovakia Airplay (ČNS IFPI)	1
Slovakia Singles Digital (ČNS IFPI)	2
Slovenia (SloTop50)	1
Spain (Promusicae)	5
Sweden (Sverigetopplistan)	1
Switzerland (Schweizer Hitparade)	1
UK Singles (Official Charts)	1
UK Dance (Official Charts)	1
US Hot Dance/Electronic Songs (Billboard)	17

==== Year-end charts ====
Chart (2014)	Position
Belgium (Ultratop Flanders)	100
Chart (2015)	Position
Australia (ARIA)	28
Austria (Ö3 Austria Top 40)	2
Belgium (Ultratop 50 Flanders)	11
Belgium Dance (Ultratop Flanders)	7
Belgium (Ultratop 50 Wallonia)	13
Belgium Dance (Ultratop Wallonia)	3
Germany (Official German Charts)	2
Hungary (Dance Top 40)	30
Hungary (Rádiós Top 40)	25
Hungary (Single Top 40)	7
Israel (Media Forest)	16
Italy (FIMI)	19
Netherlands (Dutch Top 40)	2
Netherlands (Single Top 100)	5
Poland (ZPAV)	6
Romania (Airplay 100)	1
Slovenia (SloTop50)	13
Spain (PROMUSICAE)	9
Sweden (Sverigetopplistan)	5
Switzerland (Schweizer Hitparade)	1
UK Singles (Official Charts Company)	17
US Hot Dance/Electronic Songs (Billboard)	49
Chart (2016)	Position
Hungary (Dance Top 40)	64
Hungary (Single Top 40)	85
Chart (2022)	Position
Hungary (Rádiós Top 40)	60
Chart (2023)	Position
Hungary (Rádiós Top 40)	91
Chart (2024)	Position
Hungary (Rádiós Top 40)	80

=== Decade-end charts ===
Chart (2010–2019)	Position
Germany (Official German Charts)	27

=== Certifications ===
Region	Certification	Certified units/sales
Australia (ARIA)	2× Platinum	140,000^{‡}
Belgium (BRMA)	5× Platinum	100,000^{‡}
Canada (Music Canada)	2× Platinum	160,000^{‡}
Denmark (IFPI Danmark)	3× Platinum	270,000^{‡}
Germany (BVMI)	Diamond	1,000,000^{‡}
Italy (FIMI)	4× Platinum	200,000^{‡}
Mexico (AMPROFON)	2× Platinum	120,000^{‡}
Netherlands (NVPI)	Platinum	30,000^{‡}
New Zealand (RMNZ)	4× Platinum	120,000^{‡}
Norway (IFPI Norway)	5× Platinum	50,000^{‡}
Poland (ZPAV)	2× Platinum	40,000^{*}
Spain (Promusicae)	3× Platinum	180,000^{‡}
Sweden (GLF)	5× Platinum	200,000^{‡}
United Kingdom (BPI)	3× Platinum	1,800,000^{‡}
^{*} Sales figures based on certification alone.^{‡} Sales+streaming figures based on certification alone.

== See also ==
- List of Airplay 100 number ones of the 2010s
