= I Can't Love You Back =

Single by Easton Corbin

from the album Easton Corbin
- Released: November 8, 2010
- Recorded: 2009
- Genre: Country
- Length: 4:05
- Label: Mercury Nashville
- Songwriters: Carson Chamberlain; Jeff Hyde; Clint Daniels
- Producer: Carson Chamberlain

Easton Corbin singles chronology
"Roll with It" (2010)	"I Can't Love You Back" (2010)	"Lovin' You Is Fun" (2012)

"I Can't Love You Back" is a song written by Carson Chamberlain, Jeff Hyde, and Clint Daniels and recorded by American country music artist Easton Corbin. It was released in November 2010 as the third and final single from Corbin's self-titled debut album. The song peaked at number 14 on the U.S. Billboard Hot Country Songs chart.

== Content ==
The narrator goes through all the ways he wants to love his significant other except for the fact that she is not returning to him.

== Music video ==
The music video for the song was directed by Shaun Silva and premiered on Vevo and GAC in December 2010. The storyline of the video is told backwards, starting with a young woman being T-boned by a truck, presumably fatally, showing in reverse her drive into the city, walk up the driveway, through the house, and all the way back to the bedroom where Corbin does his performance. She leans down to kiss him and as she does so, time once again flows normally. The woman leaves, but not before looking back at Corbin a final time as he simply watches her intently. The video ends with her walking out the door, en route to her fate, while Corbin sits with tear-filled eyes.

== Critical reception ==
Kyle Ward of Roughstock gave the song a favorable review with 4.5/5 stars, saying that Corbin "pours out his heart and bears his emotions and grabs you with a convincingly heartbreaking performance." Ward also states that the production was "appropriate; wistful during the verses and a louder, more emotional score during the chorus." Kevin John Coyne of Country Universe gave the song a B grade, saying that the song is beautiful but the only flaw is his "over-singing in the choruses."

== Chart performance ==
"I Can't Love You Back" debuted at number 54 on the U.S. Billboard Hot Country Songs chart for the chart week ending November 27, 2010. It also debuted at number 97 on the U.S. Billboard Hot 100 chart for the week of March 26, 2011. It peaked at number 14 in May 2011, becoming his first single to miss the Top 10 of the country chart.

Chart (2010–2011)	Peak position
US Hot Country Songs (Billboard)	14
US Billboard Hot 100	76

=== Year-end charts ===
Chart (2011)	Position
US Country Songs (Billboard)	57
