= Yup (song) =

Single by Easton Corbin

from the album About to Get Real
- Released: July 27, 2015
- Recorded: 2014–15
- Genre: Country
- Length: 3:21 (album version); 2:58 (radio edit)
- Label: Mercury Nashville
- Songwriters: Shane Minor; Phil O'Donnell; Wade Kirby
- Producer: Carson Chamberlain

Easton Corbin singles chronology
"Baby Be My Love Song" (2014)	"Yup" (2015)	"Are You with Me" (2016)

"Yup" is a song written by Shane Minor, Wade Kirby, and Phil O'Donnell and recorded by American country music artist Easton Corbin. It was released in July 2015 as the third single from Corbin's album About to Get Real.

== Critical reception ==
An uncredited Taste of Country review stated that "Sonically, Corbin stays true to his traditional roots. He’s a favorite among those calling for a return to a more organic sound on the radio, and on “Yup” he does nothing to push his signature sound to an edge. There’s always room for him on the radio."

== Chart performance ==
On the week of December 5th, 2015, "Yup" peaked at number 35 on the Billboard Country Airplay chart.

Chart (2015)	Peak position
US Country Airplay (Billboard)	35
US Hot Country Songs (Billboard)	44
