= Lovin' You Is Fun =

Single by Easton Corbin

from the album All Over the Road
- Released: February 27, 2012
- Recorded: 2011–12
- Genre: Country
- Length: 3:20
- Label: Mercury Nashville
- Songwriters: Jim Beavers; Bob DiPiero
- Producer: Carson Chamberlain

Easton Corbin singles chronology
"I Can't Love You Back" (2010)	"Lovin' You Is Fun" (2012)	"All Over the Road" (2013)

"Lovin' You Is Fun" is a song written by Jim Beavers and Bob DiPiero and recorded by American country music artist Easton Corbin. It was released in February 2012 as the first single from Corbin's 2013 album All Over the Road.

== Critical reception ==
Billy Dukes of Taste of Country gave the song four and a half stars out of five, writing that "there is a little lesson to be learned from Corbin’s message, but the easy rhythm makes this one that few will take issue with learning again and again." Matt Bjorke of Roughstock gave the song four stars out of five, calling it "a strong, melodic and memorable single."

Ben Foster of Country Universe gave the song a B+ grade, saying that the song "is a smooth, steel-heavy two-stepper, which Corbin effortlessly eases into with his signature laid-back vocal style that repeatedly draws comparisons to George Strait" and "the lyrics don’t warrant much explanation, but the sonic packaging almost makes them seem inconsequential."

== Music video ==
The music video was directed by Shaun Silva and filmed in Austin, Texas. It premiered in April 2012 as part of CMT Big New Music Weekend.

== Chart performance ==
"Lovin' You Is Fun" debuted at number 59 on the U.S. Billboard Hot Country Songs chart for the week of March 3, 2012. It also debuted at number 100 on the U.S. Billboard Hot 100 chart for the week of July 7, 2012. It also debuted at number 99 on the Canadian Hot 100 chart for the week of November 3, 2012.

Chart (2012)	Peak position
Canada Hot 100 (Billboard)	87
US Billboard Hot 100	57
US Country Airplay (Billboard)	5
US Hot Country Songs (Billboard)	7

=== Year-end charts ===
Chart (2012)	Position
US Country Songs (Billboard)	8

== Certifications ==
Region	Certification	Certified units/sales
United States (RIAA)	Platinum	1,000,000^{‡}
^{‡} Sales+streaming figures based on certification alone.
