= Sorisa =

Canadian singer

- Born: Toronto, Ontario, Canada
- Genres: Electropop; EDM; pop; hyperpop
- Occupations: Singer; songwriter
- Instrument: Vocals
- Label: Atlantic Records

Sorisa is a Canadian singer and songwriter from Toronto, Ontario. Named one of Billboard Canada's 2026 Artists to Watch, he is known for his electropop sound and his viral breakthrough single "U Look So Good In Fall". He is currently signed to Atlantic Records and represented by The Feldman Agency.

== Career ==
His popularity sparked with his single "U Look So Good In Fall", an electropop song that went viral on TikTok and Instagram through his marketing strategy of harmonizing his songs on relatively low-quality devices.

In November 2025, Sorisa made his concert debut, as headliner, at Lee's Palace in Toronto. The free show filled the 500-person venue within ten minutes. He released his first (official) extended play, I Love Colours, on March 10, 2026 under license to Atlantic Recording Corporation. The five-track episode shows his "signature blend of EDM and pop, mixing buzzing, electronic synths with bright keys and colourful melodies."

To advertise the episode, Sorisa began the I Love Colours Experience mini-tour, where he performed at the Mod Club in Toronto, followed by the Mercury Theatre in New York City. In May 2026, he was signed by The Feldman Agency, one of Canada's largest booking agencies. That same month, he made his festival début at Rolling Loud in Orlando, Florida. He performed at First Class Fest at the Bowl at Sobeys Stadium in Toronto in August 2026.

Billboard Canada has described his style as "equal parts addicting, colourful and electrifying, reminiscent of artists Nate Sib and 2hollis", since he blends niche genres of rap and hip-hop with hyperpop and EDM-style beats.

== Discography ==
=== Extended plays ===
Title	Details
I Love Colours	Released: March 10, 2026; Label: Atlantic Records; Formats: Digital download, streaming; Track listing: 1. "Can We Talk"; 2. "Get Used To Me"; 3. "11 Days Ago"; 4. "Match Girl"; 5. "Flying, Flying Colours"
I do Got it	Released: August 18, 2026; Label: Atlantic Records; Formats: Digital download, streaming; Track listing: 1. "Can I Do Anything That I Want"; 2. "False Start"; 3. "8241"; 4. "Melody I Can Finish"; 5. "Sunrise"

=== Singles ===
Title	Year	Album
"Keep My Phone On Ring"	2024	Non-album singles
"Forehead Cheek Chin"	2025	Non-album singles
"Walk, Star"	2025	Non-album singles
"Again"	2025	Non-album singles
"Go"	2025	Non-album singles
"U Look So Good In Fall"	2025	Non-album singles
"2 Steps"	2025	Non-album singles
"Tell Me Why"	2025	Non-album singles
"98/99" / "Whats Wrong With U"	2025	Non-album singles
"La"	2025	Non-album singles
"Catch Up"	2025	Non-album singles
"Get Used To Me"	2026	I Love Colours
"11 Days Ago"	2026	I Love Colours
"Melody I Can Finish"	2026	I do Got it
"I Wanna Be A Star"	2026	Non-album single
"Saka (Feat. Deevs)"	2026	Non-album single
