= Best Friends (Wilson novel) =

2004 novel by Jacqueline Wilson

- First edition
- Author: Jacqueline Wilson
- Illustrator: Nick Sharratt
- Cover artist: Nick Sharratt
- Language: English
- Genre: Children's novel
- Publisher: Doubleday (first edition, hardback)
- Publication date: 4 March 2004
- Publication place: United Kingdom
- Media type: Print (hardback & paperback) and audiobook
- Pages: 228 pp
- ISBN: 978-0-385-60606-6
- OCLC: 53821502
- Preceded by: Midnight
- Followed by: The Diamond Girls

Best Friends is a children's novel by Jacqueline Wilson, first published in 2004. It is illustrated by Nick Sharratt, whose black-and-white comic strip sketches precede each chapter.

== Plot summary ==
The story follows two 11-year-old girls, Gemma Jackson and Alice Barlow, who have been best friends from birth, having been born on the same day and in the same hospital. The two are polar opposites; Gemma is shown as a tomboy who likes playing wild and exciting sports, while Alice is depicted as "girly" and loves ballet and the color pink. Despite their differences, the two girls spend almost every day together, and on their birthdays they always make a wish to stay friends forever.

One day, Alice tells Gemma that she and her parents are moving far away to Scotland. Gemma and Alice are both devastated at the thought of being separated, but Alice's snobbish mother claims that Alice will make new friends when they move. Not wanting this, Alice suggests that she and Gemma run away in disguise - and do so during the leaving party on the day before the move. Gemma suggests they catch a train to London. On the way they are recognized and sussed out by classmate Billy "Biscuits" McVitie, whose baby sister Polly was baptised that same day at the church that Gemma and Alice passed en-route to the railway station; he tells his mother, who informs Alice's and Gemma's parents who in turn then catch the girls before they can board the train. Alice moves away and the girls are separated, and also banned from speaking to each other again. Gemma was blamed for the absconding incident.

Gemma's grandfather invites her to accompany him on a trip to Scotland when he is hired to taxi a client from Scotland to London. Upon arrival at Alice's new house the two share a happy reunion and Gemma is allowed to stay for the day. However, Gemma grows insecure when Alice is excited to show off her new pink bedroom and large house. Later in the day, Gemma meets Alice's new friend Flora Hamilton, who is a classmate to Alice at her new school as well as her new ballet class. Gemma is intimidated by Flora's friendship with Alice and approval from Alice's mother (including when Flora lies about Alice saying Gemma's family are "quite poor" regarding how a china doll came to fruition - Gemma's late grandmother left the doll to her, which she later gave Alice). When the cake Gemma has made and brought is presented at dinner, Alice requests that she and Gemma cut the cake together and make their traditional wish. When Alice's mother gives Flora the knife instead, Gemma finally snaps and shoves the cake in Flora's face.

Gemma is made to leave but Alice assures Gemma they are still best friends and returns the doll to her. Gemma gradually starts to rebuild her life without Alice, including establishing her friendship with Biscuits. The story ends on Gemma (and Alice's) birthday, when she celebrates with her family, Biscuits, and Biscuits' family. Gemma receives a birthday card and charm bracelet from Alice reassuring her that despite Alice not being able to contact Gemma any longer, they will remain best friends forever.

== Main characters ==
- Gemma Jackson: Gemma is the story's main protagonist and narrator. Her mum is Liz, however her dad, whilst mentioned in the story and married to Liz, is not named. She is a tomboyish, optimistic, and clumsy 11 year old, who enjoys football, bike riding and spending time with her grandfather. She is Alice's best friend and is devastated when she learns that Alice is moving away to Scotland. She gets the blame for running away. She has two brothers, Jack and Callum.
- Alice Barlow: Gemma's best friend. Her parents are Karen and Bob. In contrast to Gemma, she is quite the girly girl, who loves dressing up, ballet and the color pink. She is also eleven. She appears traumatised when she and her parents move away to Scotland, having been parted from Gemma. However, she is spoiled with all sorts of glamorous items in their new home. She makes friends with snobby Flora. She writes Gemma a birthday card at the end of the book, accompanied by her special charm bracelet with a new charm added on it. While she is surrounded by fancy and elegant objects, lives in a beautiful countryside home and attends an ever so fancy school, all she truly wants is her best friend to be here, too.
- Billy "Biscuits" McVitie: The girls' schoolfriend, a tubby boy who loves food, both eating and cooking. Gemma and Alice form a temporary hatred for him when he "tells on them" to his mother about their plots on running away. When Alice is gone, Gemma and Biscuits become closer as friends and work together for a project on famous TV chef "Fat Larry", as well as Biscuits making Gemma her special birthday cake at her party. Towards the beginning, Gemma is friends with Biscuits which is not so much shared by Alice, but this changes when the running away happened (the disliking for him became mutual), however as time slowly passes she realises what he did was out of care, and he just wants his special friend Gemma to be safe and happy. Biscuits is described as good-natured, kind and cheerful, as well as loved by all of his friends.
- Flora Hamilton: A girl who befriends Alice in Scotland. Gemma often frets that Flora is trying to "take Alice away from her" and becomes highly suspicious of them together. Flora is described as pretty, kind, mature, and a good ballet dancer. She lets Gemma email her to communicate with Alice (with Gemma's brother Jack effectively being messenger pigeon on the receiving end given this was done from Jack's computer) - this was after Alice's mother put a stop to writing letters to each other after only two letters. Gemma felt very uneasy about the email correspondence and she referred to Flora as "Margarine Girl" in her head during this time. During Gemma's visit to Scotland, Flora is disdainful of Gemma's childish ways and tries to get Alice to do what she wants to do. She openly disapproves of Gemma and Alice's special friendship, much to Gemma's dismay. In the message in Alice's birthday card to Gemma at the end of the book, it is mentioned that the dynamics have changed between Alice and Flora - Alice was having a birthday party and her mum had made her ask Flora, however Alice 'didn't like her much now' (presumably following Gemma's visit).
- Grandad: Gemma's beloved grandfather on her dad's side. He has a caring, calm and soft temperament, and loves Gemma deeply. He has affectionately nicknamed Gemma as his little Iced Gem, after the popular biscuit. His wife died when Gemma was three years old. He used to work as a taxi driver like his son (Gemma's father) but retired just as Gemma's mother went back to work full-time - however, he steps in to the taxi firm office when they need another driver.

== Goof ==
Biscuits makes appearances in Jacqueline Wilson novels Cliffhanger and Buried Alive!, albeit with no proper first name and with the surname Baker. Tim, the boy he befriends in these books, is referred to after Gemma's unsuccessful visit to Alice in Scotland as Gemma says she will never get to see Alice again. Biscuits says, "Yeah you can. This boy Tim and me are great mates and yet we only get to see each other on holiday."

== Television series ==
In 2004, a five-part adaptation was produced by CITV (later aired on CBBC). It followed the book closely, but with a few minor alterations and a new ending.

Notable differences between the book and the TV series:

- In the book, the girls' birthday is 3 July. In the TV series their birthday is 24 December.
- In the book, Karen Barlow (Alice's mum) is married to Bob and the move to Scotland was due to Bob getting a new job. In the TV series Karen is a single parent - Alice's dad was Geoff and abandoned them when Alice was little after coming out as gay (he 'ran off with the gas man'). The move to Scotland was following meeting a man over online dating called Fergus.
- In the book, Liz Jackson (Gemma's mum) works in the beauty section of department store Joseph Pilbeam. In the TV series she is a ceasing smoker, which was not mentioned in the book, and works very hard as a self employed beauty therapist. Karen is a regular client.
- In the book, no name is given for Gemma's dad and he also works as a taxi driver; in the TV series, Gemma's dad is thought to be called Tony, and also unemployed.
- In the book, Gemma has two brothers, Callum and Jack; in the TV series Gemma only has the one brother, Callum.
- In the book Biscuits' mother and father are on the scene, he has a baby sister called Polly (who was baptised during the Barlows' farewell party and Alice and Gemma walk past the hosting church en-route to the train station) and his grandmother, June, develops romantic feelings for Grandad at the end of the book. In the TV series Biscuits' mother is dead; his grandmother is his legal guardian and there seems to be no mention of a father or any siblings. Biscuits also is new to Gemma's neighborhood and the new child at her school; June is also later established to be Grandad's lady friend.
- In the book, Gemma, Alice, and Biscuits' class teacher is Mrs Watson; in the TV series the class teacher is Miss Mancer (pronounced "Maneer").
- In the book, Alice sends Gemma a birthday card and her charm bracelet with a new charm on it with a note saying they are best friends forever despite no more contact. In the TV series, Alice surprises Gemma at the end by turning up at the latter's birthday party after a contact on her new mobile phone, with Alice moving back to London with her family after coming to an agreement with Gemma’s Grandad and Fergus.
