= Easton Corbin =

American country music singer (born 1982)

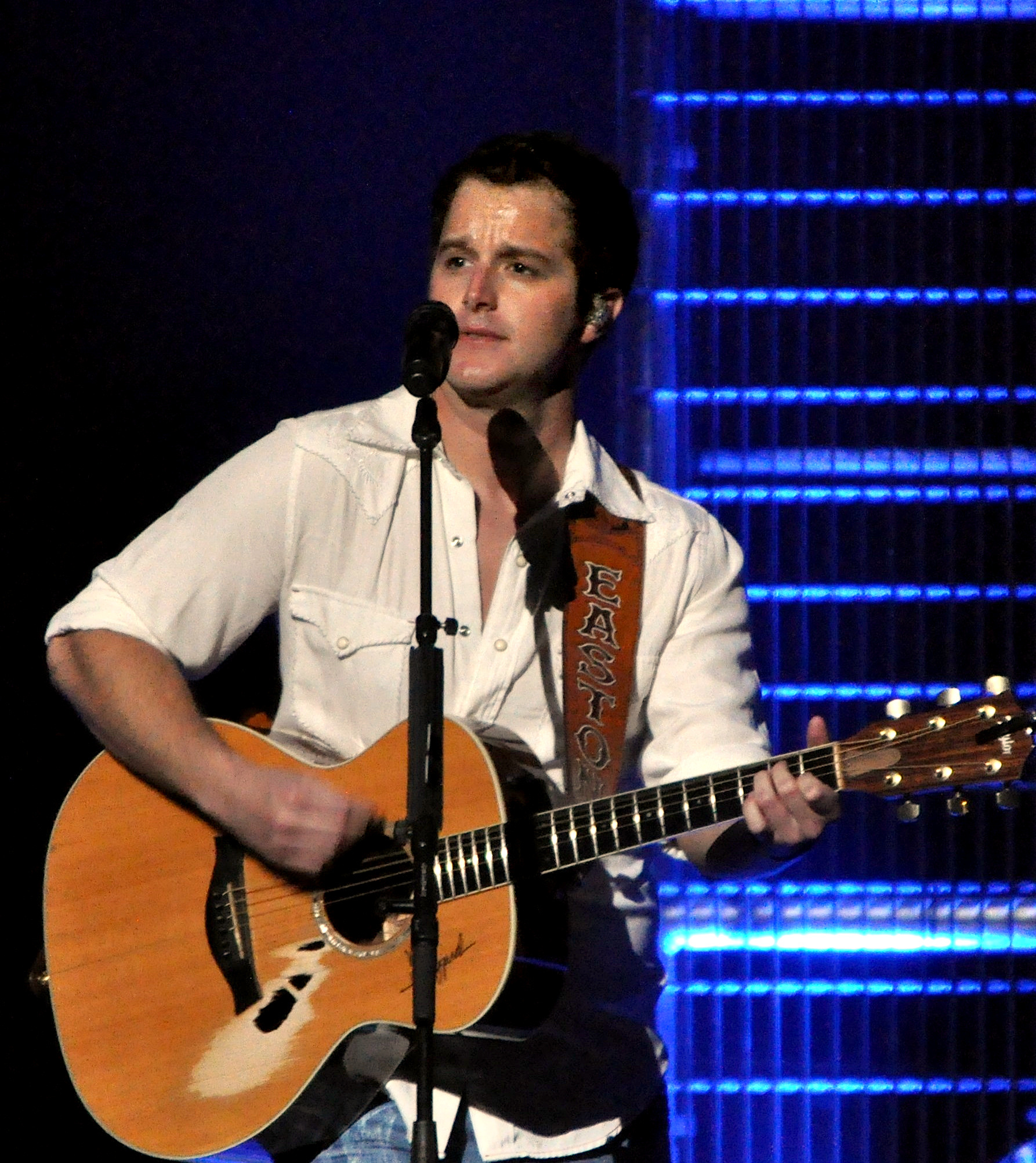
- Easton Corbin in concert in 2013

Background information
- Born: Dan Easton Corbin; April 12, 1982 (age 44)
- Origin: Trenton, Florida, U.S.
- Genre: Country
- Occupation: Singer-songwriter
- Instruments: Vocals, guitar
- Years active: 2005–present
- Labels: Mercury Nashville, Stone Country Records
- Website: eastoncorbin.com

Dan Easton Corbin (born April 12, 1982) is an American country music singer. He signed to Mercury Records Nashville in 2009 and released his self-titled debut album in March 2010, featuring the two number-one hits "A Little More Country Than That" and "Roll with It", as well as the number-14 hit "I Can't Love You Back". His second album, All Over the Road, was released in September 2012. Its first single, "Lovin' You Is Fun", was released in February 2012. The album's second single, "All Over the Road", was released in January 2013. As of 2021, he had sold over 500,000 albums and over 5 million singles. His song "Are You with Me" became an international hit in a remix version released by the Belgian DJ and record producer Lost Frequencies.

== Biography ==
Dan Easton Corbin is a native of Trenton, Florida. He lived on his grandparents' farm following his parents' divorce, and was introduced to country music-themed television programs such as Hee Haw. After taking guitar lessons at 14 from session musician Pee Wee Melton at Dixie Music Center, he joined a band which won opening slots at a music festival and for Janie Fricke and Mel McDaniel.

He attended the University of Florida's College of Agricultural and Life Sciences and earned an agribusiness degree, before marrying his wife, Briann, on September 2, 2006. They moved to Nashville, Tennessee, on October 14, 2006, where he worked at an Ace Hardware and performed at writers' nights. A distant cousin who is a professor of entertainment management recommended him to contacts in Nashville.

On The Bobby Bones Show on September 3, 2013, Corbin mentioned that he is no longer married. He and Briann divorced in 2012.

== Music career ==
=== 2005–2011: Easton Corbin ===
In 2005, Corbin entered a contest at First Street Music in Lake City, Florida, for the Annual Suwannee River Jam. Former store owner Andy Temple recognized his talent and introduced him to Nashville-based songwriter Reese Wilson. In 2008, Corbin recorded a six-track demo CD with Wilson and producer Steve Davis; on the CD were three full instrument tracks and three acoustic tracks. The songs on the demo were "All About You", "I Ain't A Highway", "Missin' You", "Gettin' 'Got, Good", "Miracles Happen" and a cover of Hank Williams, Jr's "Eleven Roses". Only a small number of the demo discs were pressed, so the disc itself is very scarce and has become a highly sought-after collector's item for hardcore fans. The tracks can be found digitally on YouTube. The tracks have never been added to any of Corbin's albums yet, making them still unreleased.

Joe Fisher, senior director of A&R at Universal Music Group Nashville, signed Easton Corbin to the Mercury Nashville label the following year. He released his debut single, "A Little More Country Than That", in July. Rory Lee Feek of Joey + Rory wrote the song with Don Poythress and Wynn Varble. The label released a four-song digital extended play entitled A Little More Country Than That in August, shortly before the single entered Top 40 on the Billboard Hot Country Songs chart. Corbin's self-titled debut album was released in March 2010, under the production of Carson Chamberlain. The album had first-week sales of 43,000 copies, making for the highest first-week sales on the Mercury Nashville label in seven years.

"A Little More Country Than That" peaked at Number One on the country chart dated for the week ending April 3, 2010, making Easton Corbin the first solo male country artist to send a debut single to Number One since Dierks Bentley in 2003 with "What Was I Thinkin'". "Roll with It" was released as the album's second single; in October it also hit Number One. The album's third and final single, "I Can't Love You Back," released to radio in November 2010 and reached a peak of number 14 in early 2011.

To promote Easton Corbin, he went on tour as an opening act for Brad Paisley's H2O World Tour, which began in May 2010.

=== 2012–2013: All Over the Road ===
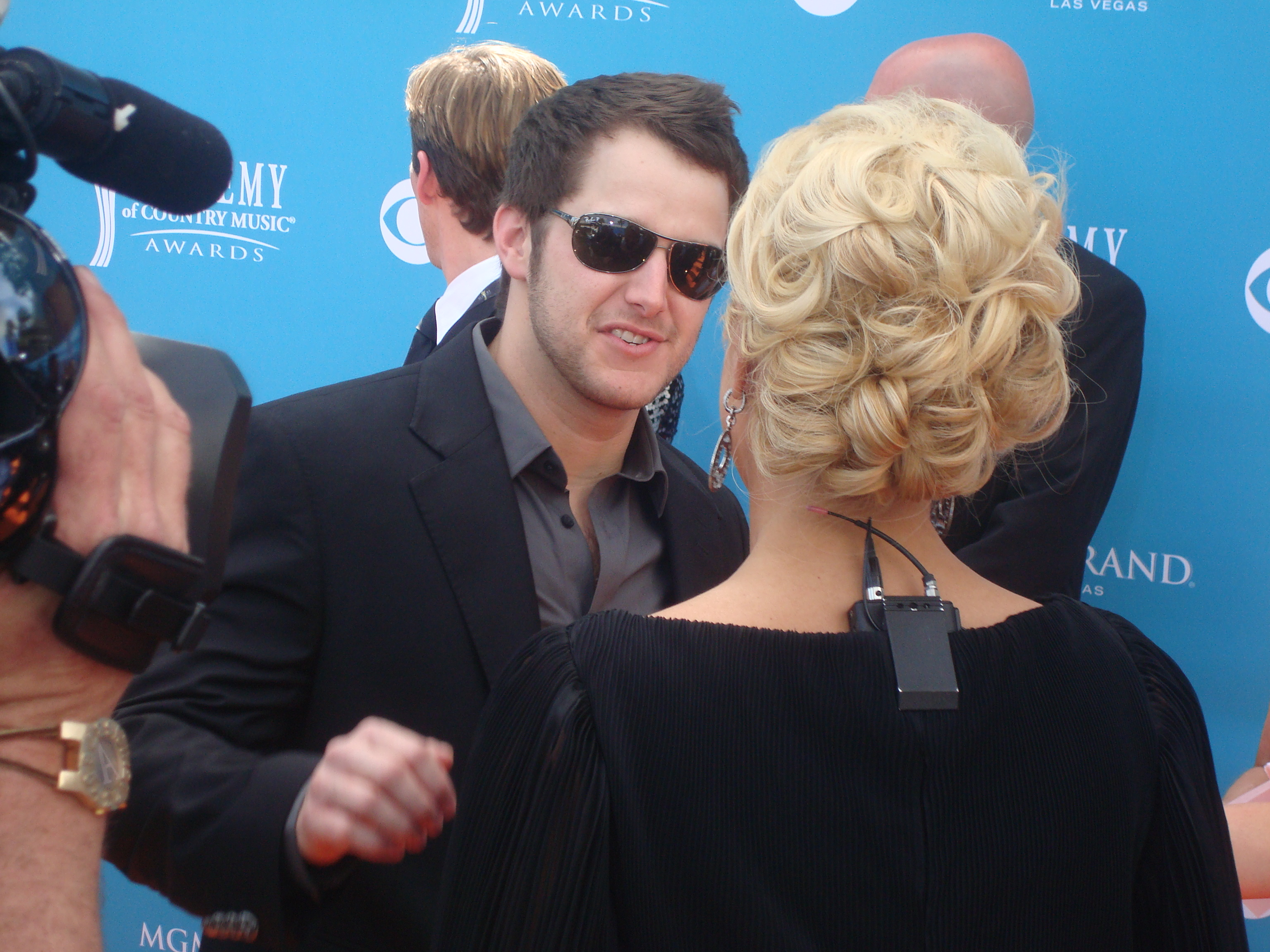
Easton Corbin being interviewed

Easton Corbin's fourth single, "Lovin' You Is Fun", was released in February 2012. It peaked at number 5 on the Billboard Country Airplay chart. It served as the lead-off single to his second studio album, All Over the Road, which was released on September 18, 2012. The album's second single, the title track, was released in January 2013 and peaked at number 3 on Country Airplay in September 2013. Both singles were also certified Gold by the RIAA.

=== 2014–2016: About to Get Real ===
Corbin's third studio album, About to Get Real, was released on June 30, 2015. Its first single, "Clockwork", was released to country radio in January 2014. It peaked at number 32 on the Billboard Country Airplay chart. The album's second single, "Baby Be My Love Song", was released on September 8, 2014, and became Corbin's fifth Top 5 country hit. "Yup" and "Are You with Me" were released as the album's third and fourth singles, and peaked at numbers 35 and 41 on the Country Airplay chart, respectively.

=== 2017–2020: Didn't Miss a Beat EP ===
On January 30, 2017, Corbin released "A Girl Like You" to country radio, the lead single from his upcoming fourth studio album. The song climbed the charts very slowly, and peaked at No. 6 on the Billboard Country Airplay chart after charting in excess of a year. Although the single reached the top 10, Mercury Nashville terminated Corbin from the label in February 2018.

Corbin independently released a new single, "Somebody's Gotta Be Country", in January 2019 and almost made it into the Billboard Country Airplay Chart by peaking at No. 64.

On November 13, 2020, Corbin released his the EP titled "Didn't Miss a Beat", his first release since termination from Mercury. The EP did not include his previous two singles "A Girl Like You" and "Somebody's Gotta Be Country". The release is Corbin's first not to chart on Billboard.

=== 2021–2025: Let's Do Country Right ===
On January 25, 2022, it was announced that Corbin had signed a record deal with Stone Country Records. His first single with the label, "I Can't Decide", was released to country radio on May 9, 2022. It peaked at number 48 on the Country Airplay chart.

His fourth studio album, Let's Do Country Right, was released via Stone Country Records on January 20, 2023. The album's third single, "Marry That Girl", was released to country radio on February 13, 2023.

After "Marry That Girl" failed at country radio, Stone Country Records dropped Corbin from their label in early 2025.

=== 2026–present: Hate To Be That Guy ===
On September 25, 2026, Corbin announced his new single to country radio would be "Hate To Be That Guy" under a new record label.

== Discography ==
=== Studio albums ===
Title	Details	Peak chart positions		Sales	Certifications (sales threshold)
Title	Details	US	US Country	Sales	Certifications (sales threshold)
Easton Corbin	Release date: March 2, 2010; Label: Mercury Nashville; Formats: CD, music download	10	4	US: 371,000	RIAA: Gold
All Over the Road	Release date: September 18, 2012; Label: Mercury Nashville; Formats: CD, music download	11	2	US: 180,000	
About to Get Real	Release date: June 30, 2015; Label: Mercury Nashville; Formats: CD, music download	13	1	US: 60,800	
Let's Do Country Right	Release Date: January 20, 2023; Label: Stone Country; Formats: CD, music download	—	—		

=== Extended plays ===
Title	Details	Peak chart positions	
Title	Details	US Country	US Heat
A Little More Country Than That	Release date: August 18, 2009; Label: Mercury Nashville; Formats: CD, music download	44	27
Didn't Miss a Beat	Release date: November 13, 2020; Label: Honkytonk Land Records; Format: Music download	—	—

=== Singles ===
Year	Single	Peak chart positions					Certifications (sales threshold)	Album
Year	Single	US	US Country Songs	US Country Airplay	CAN	CAN Country	Certifications (sales threshold)	Album
2009	"A Little More Country Than That"	42	1		66	2	RIAA: Platinum	Easton Corbin
2010	"Roll with It"	55	1		88	1	RIAA: Platinum	Easton Corbin
2010	"I Can't Love You Back"	76	14		—	38		Easton Corbin
2012	"Lovin' You Is Fun"	57	7	5	87	4	RIAA: Platinum	All Over the Road
2013	"All Over the Road"	51	9	3	78	12	RIAA: 2× Platinum	All Over the Road
2014	"Clockwork"	— (Note: "Clockwork" did not enter the US Billboard Hot 100, but peaked at number 24 on the Bubbling Under Hot 100 Singles chart.)	31	32	—	—		About to Get Real
2014	"Baby Be My Love Song"	56	11	3	77	5	RIAA: Gold	About to Get Real
2015	"Yup"	—	44	35	—	—		About to Get Real
2016	"Are You with Me"	—	46	41	—	—		About to Get Real
2017	"A Girl Like You"	98	15	6	—	10	RIAA: Gold	Non-album-single
2019	"Somebody's Gotta Be Country"	—	—	—	—	—		Let's Do Country Right
2022	"I Can't Decide"	—	—	48	—	—		Let's Do Country Right
2023	"Marry That Girl"	—	—	50	—	—		Let's Do Country Right
2026	"Hate To Be That Guy"	—	—	—	—	—		TBD
"—" denotes a recording that did not chart or was not released.

=== Promotional singles ===
Year	Single	Peak positions	Album
Year	Single	US Country Songs	Album
2015	"Let's Ride"	50	Non-album single

=== Featured singles ===
Year	Title	Peak chart positions							
Year	Title	AUT	BEL (Vl)	BEL (Wa)	FR	GER	NED	NOR	SUI
2014	"Are You with Me" (credited to Lost Frequencies featuring vocals of Easton Corbin)	1	1	1	4	1	3	4	1

=== Music videos ===
Year	Video	Director
2009	"A Little More Country Than That"	Stephen Shepherd
2010	"A Little More Country Than That" (acoustic)	Stephen Shepherd
2010	"I Can't Love You Back"	Shaun Silva
2012	"Lovin' You Is Fun"	Shaun Silva
2012	"Are You with Me" (acoustic)	Stephen Shepherd
2012	"All Over the Road" (acoustic)	Stephen Shepherd
2012	"Lovin' You Is Fun" (acoustic)	Stephen Shepherd
2013	"All Over the Road" (Yahoo! Ram Country)	Steve Angus
2013	"All Over the Road"	Roman White
2014	"Clockwork"	Shaun Silva
2014	"Baby Be My Love Song" (Yahoo! Ram Country)	Steve Angus
2015	"Baby Be My Love Song"	Shaun Silva
2015	"Baby Be My Love Song" (acoustic)	Dusty Barker
2015	"Let's Ride"	Shaun Silva
2017	"A Girl Like You" (acoustic)	—N/a
2019	"Somebody's Gotta Be Country"	—N/a
2019	"Raising Humans" (acoustic)	—N/a
2020	"Didn't Miss A Beat"	—N/a

== Awards and nominations ==
Year	Association	Category	Result
2010	CMT Music Awards	USA Weekend Breakthrough Video of the Year – "A Little More Country Than That"	Nominated
2010	Country Music Association	New Artist of the Year	Nominated
2010	Country Music Association	Single of the Year – "A Little More Country Than That"	Nominated
2010	American Country Awards	New/Breakthrough Artist of the Year	Won
2010	American Country Awards	Single of the Year – "A Little More Country Than That"	Nominated
2010	American Country Awards	Single by a Male Artist – "A Little More Country Than That"	Nominated
2010	American Country Awards	Single by New/Breakthrough Artist – "A Little More Country Than That"	Won
2010	American Country Awards	Music Video of the Year – "A Little More Country Than That"	Nominated
2010	American Country Awards	Music Video by a Male Artist – "A Little More Country Than That"	Nominated
2010	American Country Awards	Music Video by New/Breakthrough Artist – "A Little More Country Than That"	Won
2011	Academy of Country Music Awards	Top New Solo Vocalist	Nominated
