= Roll with It (Easton Corbin song) =

Single by Easton Corbin

from the album Easton Corbin
- Released: April 26, 2010
- Recorded: 2009
- Genre: Country
- Length: 3:28
- Label: Mercury Nashville
- Songwriters: David Lee; Tony Lane; Johnny Park
- Producer: Carson Chamberlain

Easton Corbin singles chronology
"A Little More Country Than That" (2009)	"Roll with It" (2010)	"I Can't Love You Back" (2010)

"Roll with It" is a song written by David Lee, Tony Lane, and Johnny Park and recorded by American country music artist Easton Corbin. It was released in April 2010 as the second single from Corbin's self-titled debut album. The song became Corbin's second (consecutive) number one hit on the US Billboard Hot Country Songs chart for the week of October 30, 2010.

== Content ==
The narrator instructs his significant other to head to the beach, stating that if something unexpected happens, they will just "roll with it."

== Critical reception ==
Juli Thanki of Engine 145 gave the song a "thumbs up", saying that Corbin's "laidback, boy-next-door delivery fits the song perfectly" and describes the song as "an involuntary toe-tapper with a catchy hook." Matt Bjorke of Roughstock also gave the song a favorable review and a rating of 4.5/5 stars, saying that fans of George Strait will likely like the song as he states that the track could have been on any of Strait's albums for the last twenty years. Bjorke also states that the song goes down "as smooth as a shot of top-shelf whiskey." Jonathan Keefe of Slant Magazine was less positive, referring to the song as having "an awkward lyrical hook that doesn't fit the song's meter."

== Charts ==
"Roll with It" debuted at number 58 on the US Billboard Hot Country Songs chart for the week ending April 24, 2010.

=== Weekly charts ===
Chart (2010)	Peak position
US Hot Country Songs (Billboard)	1
US Billboard Hot 100	55
Canada Hot 100 (Billboard)	88

=== Year-end charts ===
Chart (2010)	Position
US Country Songs (Billboard)	6

== Certifications ==
Region	Certification	Certified units/sales
United States (RIAA)	Platinum	1,000,000^{‡}
^{‡} Sales+streaming figures based on certification alone.
