= The Diamond Girls =

2004 novel by Jacqueline Wilson

- First edition (publ. Doubleday)
- Author: Jacqueline Wilson
- Publisher: Doubleday Children's Books
- Publication date: October 1, 2004
- ISBN: 978-0-385-60607-3

The Diamond Girls is a 2004 children's novel by Jacqueline Wilson. The protagonist and narrator is Dixie Diamond, the youngest (at the start of the novel) in a family of four sisters, who all have different fathers. Their mother Sue, pregnant with her fifth child, which she believes to be a boy, decides to move them from their domicile on a council estate to a larger council house on the "Planet Estate." All her children are unhappy about this, especially the oldest, Martine, whose boyfriend Tony lives next door. As an avid believer in astrology, tarot cards, and destiny, Sue believes she knows her baby is going to be a boy, and that, regardless of her daughters' opinions, moving will be the best thing for the family.

The book was written after Wilson was reading a newspaper article about Ann Widdecombe's least favourite books. The Illustrated Mum, one of her previous works appeared in this list, because the girls had different fathers. This angered Wilson, who decided to write The Diamond Girls in response, despite the girls having different fathers, they still all live well together. Meanwhile, there is a sub-plot about six-year-old Mary, a girl who comes from a more conventional upper-middle-class family, who turns out to be being mistreated.

== Characters ==
=== Sue Diamond ===
Sue Diamond is the mother of the four (later five) Diamond girls. She has always had a poor relationship with her mother. Sue was the girlfriend of Dave, who she was with in Year Ten. She became pregnant when she was in Year Eleven, aged sixteen. Although Sue was thrilled that she was pregnant with Martine, her mother was furious. Dave initially tried his best to support Martine and Sue, but left her when he was unable to cope raising a child. Two years later, she met Dean. He was a good boyfriend at first, and he tried to be a father to Martine, and his own daughter, Jude. He could be very sweet and tender with Sue and the girls, but he could be 'a tricky guy, especially if he was crossed'. Dean later became abusive towards Sue, which caused her to leave him. Sue then met Jordan, who was very handsome, and as Sue said, he was musically talented 'and would have been a real star in the music world if he'd only had the right breaks'. Jordan later got into drugs, and took an overdose when his daughter Rochelle was two years old. Sue was contacted by the police of Jordan's death, and was devastated. After Jordan's death, Sue was struggling to cope while grieving for Jordan and managing the girls. Terry, an embalmer, was kind towards her and spent time talking to her and organizing the funeral arrangements. Upset and unable to think straight, Sue had a one-night stand with Terry. This resulted in the birth of Dixie, and Terry leaving the Diamonds to go back to his wife Stella, and older daughters as he had another family other than the Diamonds.

=== Martine Diamond ===
Martine is the oldest of the Diamond girls, aged sixteen. Her mother met her father Dave in Year Ten- when Dave got Sue pregnant, he tried to be a father to Martine, but left because he was unable to cope. At first, Martine is reluctant to leave because she does not want to be away from her boyfriend, Tony, who later has a row with Martine, resulting in the couple breaking up. However, after her “brother” Sundance is born, Martine decides to stay. At the end of the book it turns out she is pregnant. She has her mum's thick black hair, but dyes hers blonde, and because her mum wears short skirts, she wears low slung jeans. Martine tries to take care of Sundance, her baby brother", but as there is a secret involved only Dixie knows, mother Sue makes sure to have the baby away from the rest of the family, which sadly is one of the reasons why Martine escapes, although she returns at the end of the book after hearing about Dixie's accident. She decides to keep her baby of fear. Her favourite colour is red and she wants to be a businesswoman when she grows up. Also at the end of the book, she decides to talk freely about it with her mother.

=== Jude Diamond ===
Jude is the next oldest, aged fourteen. She is small, but very tough and streetwise. Although not pretty, Jude is clever, although she does not particularly try hard at school. Her father, Dean, was abusive towards Sue, and even though she states that 'he could make my heart melt' she had to leave him. Jude does not think much of her father, hence why she does not find any romantic interest in boys like her sisters Martine and Rochelle. She is Dixie's favourite sister, and is very protective of Dixie. She often got into fights with boys on the Bletchworth estate, and was elected leader of their gang. Though when she moves to the Planet Estate, things change and she is looked down upon by the other gangs of boys, who are much rougher than the boys at Bletchworth. She is also taught Wing Chun by Bruce, and is the second sister to warm up to him after Dixie. Her favourite colour is orange and her dream job is something outdoorsy.

=== Rochelle Diamond ===
Rochelle is the 12-year-old third daughter at the beginning of the novel. She is girly and flirtatious. She has long blonde curly hair, a heart-shaped face and pouty lips, and likes to wear revealing, tight and sparkly clothes. After they move to their new house she begins dating a sixteen year old boy named Ryan. Her father was an aspiring musician called Jordan who died of a drug overdose when she was two. Her favourite colour is pink and she would like to be a model when she grows up.

=== Dixie Diamond ===
Dixie is 10, the youngest of the Diamond girls, and the narrator of the story. She was preterm birth and remains small and skinny. Her father is an embalmer called Terry, who Sue met while she was arranging her previous boyfriend Jordan's funeral. Terry is married to a woman named Stella and has three young daughters with her. He rarely talks to Dixie or contacts her; however, at the end of the book, he visits Dixie in hospital and says he wants to introduce her to her half-sisters. Dixie has a toy budgie called Bluebell, who she keeps up her cardigan sleeve. She befriends six-year-old Mary, who is being abused by her mother. Her favourite colour is deep blue and she would like to be a writer when she grows up.

== Reception ==
The Diamond Girls was number eleven on The Guardian's list of bestsellers. Christina Patterson, writing a profile about Jacqueline Wilson, commented on the story's similarities with her other works, saying it's "a compelling mix of gritty realism and warmth where the chaos is largely redeemed by love."
