= Nice & Wild =

American freestyle music group

Nice N' Wild
- Also known as: Nice & Wild
- Origin: United States
- Genres: Eurodance, freestyle
- Years active: 1986–1996
- Label: Atlantic
- Past members: David Torres, Reggie Pierre, Remy Palacios, Bobby Chapman, John Minnis, Donny McDonald

Nice N' Wild, also known as Nice & Wild, was a U.S. freestyle music group that rose to fame in 1986 after their release of "Diamond Girl".

Originally formed by David Torres, Reggie Pierre, and Remy Palacios as a dance trio called Floor Breakers Inc., they signed with manager Joe Granda who named them Nice & Wild. John Minnis, then only a hired musician, recorded the co-lead vocals for "Diamond Girl"; however, was given no credit on the original release. At times, the group would perform with a pre-recorded tape featuring Minnis' vocals.

"Their debut album Energy, Love and Unity was released in March 1987. Vocals were provided by Torres, Pierre, Palacios, Bobby Chapman, Gary Henry, Granda and Minnis. In addition to including "Diamond Girl", the album also featured follow-up singles "Obsession" and "Oh Baby (I Want to Make Love Tonight)", which were less successful than the debut hit. By late 1987, members were Torres, Minnis and Donny McDonald. Nearly a decade later, the band released a follow-up album, Infatuation, again featuring Minnis prominently as the lead vocalist, along with songwriting contributions from Granda, who also served as executive producer for the project. Despite the title track and a cover of the Bill Withers classic "Ain't No Sunshine" being released as singles, further commercial success proved elusive.

== Discography ==
=== Albums ===
- Energy, Love and Unity (LP, Atlantic, 1987)
- Infatuation (CD, Right Touch Production, 1996)

=== Singles and EPs ===
- "Diamond Girl" (Top Hits, 1986)
- "Obsession" (Atlantic, 1987)
- "Oh Baby (I Want to Make Love Tonight)" (7", promo, Atlantic, 1987)
- "Infatuation"(Freestyle Records, 1995)
- "Ain't No Sunshine" (12", Right Touch Production, 1996)
