= A Little More Country Than That =

Single by Easton Corbin

from the album Easton Corbin
- Released: August 4, 2009
- Recorded: 2009
- Genre: Country
- Length: 2:52
- Label: Mercury Nashville
- Songwriters: Rory Feek; Don Poythress; Wynn Varble
- Producer: Carson Chamberlain

Easton Corbin singles chronology
"A Little More Country Than That" (2009)	"Roll with It" (2010)

Music video
- "A Little More Country Than That" at CMT.com

"A Little More Country Than That" is a song written by Joey + Rory's Rory Feek, Wynn Varble, and Don Poythress and recorded by American country music artist Easton Corbin. It was released in August 2009 as Corbin's debut single and the first from his self-titled debut album. In April 2010, the song reached number one on the U.S. Billboard Hot Country Songs chart, making Corbin the first male solo artist in seven years to send a debut single to that position. The song has also been certified platinum by the RIAA.

== Content ==
"A Little More Country Than That" is a mid-tempo song featuring accompaniment from acoustic guitar and electric guitar, with fiddle and steel guitar fills. In it, the male narrator lists off various rural themes (such as "catching channel cat") each time saying that he is "a little more country than that."

Rory Lee Feek, one-half of the duo Joey + Rory, wrote the song with Don Poythress and Wynn Varble while the three were at a writing retreat held at Mickey Newbury's cabin near Nashville, Tennessee. Poythress began playing a tune on the guitar when Feek suggested the song title "A Little More Country Than That." The song was originally intended to be recorded by Blaine Larsen, but it sat unrecorded for several years before producer Carson Chamberlain heard it and recommended it for Corbin.

== Music video ==
The music video for the song was directed by Stephen Shepherd and premiered on September 17, 2009. It depicts Corbin singing and playing guitar in rural areas, as well as scenes of him singing in front of a bonfire at a party.

== Critical reception ==
Karlie Justus of Engine 145 gave the song a positive review, comparing Corbin's vocals to those of George Strait and saying that the song had "organic phrases" and a traditionally country sound. Matt Bjorke of Roughstock also gave the song a favorable review, saying that it was "refreshing" to hear Corbin's neotraditionalist country influences. Jonathan Keefe of Slant Magazine was somewhat negative, referring to the song as "a slightly more purposeful variation on an interminable series of rote lists of rural-ish points of reference that Nashville's unambitious go-to songwriters have been attempting to pass off as songs for the past few years."

== Chart performance ==
"A Little More Country Than That" debuted at No. 56 on the US Billboard Hot Country Songs chart for the chart week ending August 22, 2009. It also debuted at No. 100 on the Billboard Hot 100 on the week ending January 23, 2010.

The song peaked at Number One on the US country charts for the week ending April 3, 2010, its thirty-second week on that chart. It made Corbin the first solo male artist to send a debut single to Number One since Dierks Bentley's "What Was I Thinkin'" in September 2003, and the first country music artist overall to have a number-one debut single since the Zac Brown Band's "Chicken Fried" in December 2008.

== Charts ==
=== Weekly charts ===
Chart (2009–2010)	Peak position
Canada Hot 100 (Billboard)	66
US Billboard Hot 100	42
US Hot Country Songs (Billboard)	1

=== Year-end charts ===
Chart (2010)	Position
US Country Songs (Billboard)	19

== Certifications ==
Region	Certification	Certified units/sales
United States (RIAA)	Platinum	1,000,000^{‡}
^{‡} Sales+streaming figures based on certification alone.

== Parodies ==
American parody artist Cledus T. Judd released a parody of "A Little More Country Than That" titled "A Little More Hungry Than That" on his 2012 album "Parodyziac!!".
