= Akagündüz Kutbay =

Akagündüz (Aka Gündüz) Kutbay
- Kutbay performing at Mevlana Festival, Konya (Turkey), 1971

Background information
- Born: August 17, 1934
- Origin: Turkey
- Died: August 27, 1979 (aged 45)
- Genres: Turkish classical
- Instrument: Turkish ney reed flute
- Labels: Aras, Atlantic, PlayaSound/Auvidis, OCORA, Kent, Sun

Aka Gündüz Kutbay (August 17, 1934, Istanbul - August 27, 1979, Istanbul), was a Turkish ney (oblique rim-blown reed flute) player of the 1960s and 1970s, known for his traditional sound, deep tones (dem sesleri), and interest in jazz, Tibetan, Indian, and other world musics.

Kutbay was a staff musician for many years at Radio Istanbul, where he considered himself a follower of Ulvi Erguner (Director of Turkish Music) and Ulvi's father, Süleyman Erguner ("Dede"). Kutbay taught ney at Turkish Music National Conservatory in Istanbul (İstanbul Teknik Üniversitesi Türk Musiki Devlet Konservatuarı) from about 1973 to 1979. He served as Head Ney Player (Neyzenbaşı) at the Mevlana Festival in Konya in the early 1970s and led the first North American tour of the Mevlevi Dervishes in 1972 together with Ulvi Erguner.

In Turkey, Aras record label published his LPs and in the US, Atlantic Records produced Music of the Whirling Dervishes featuring Kutbay and Kâni Karaca. Playasound/Auvidis released a CD in 1991 of solo improvisations (taksimler) by Kutbay; the longest of these lasts twenty-three minutes. He appears onscreen briefly playing ney at the beginning of Peter Brook's 1979 film, Meetings with Remarkable Men.

== Audio selection ==
- Short excerpt of improvisation (taksim) by Kutbay 1.2MB, MP3, 1:17 duration
- Short excerpt of deep tones (dem sesleri) by Kutbay 1.2MB, mp3, 1:17 duration
