= Scott Law =

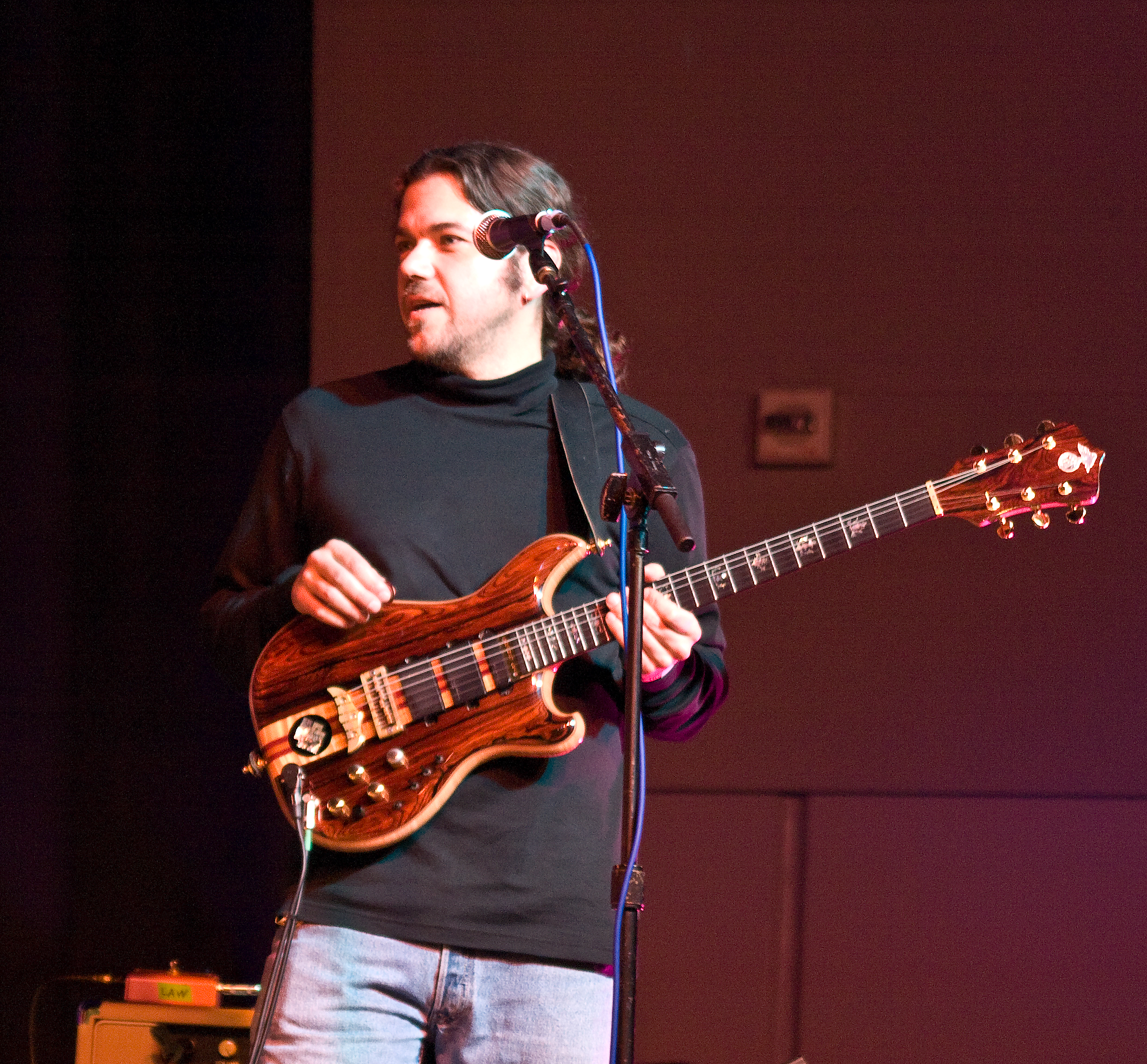

Background information
- Born: Southern California
- Genres: Rock, blues, bluegrass, Americana
- Occupations: Singer-songwriter, multi-instrumentalist, studio musician, record producer
- Instruments: Guitar, mandolin, vocals, drums
- Years active: 1992–present
- Label: Volcano Underground
- Website: ScottLawMusic.com

Scott Law is an American singer-songwriter, record producer, and multi-instrumentalist known for his work with guitar and mandolin. Based in Portland, Oregon, he has been a professional musician since 1992, performing within genres such as rock, blues, bluegrass, and Americana with groups such as The String Cheese Incident. In 1999 Law founded Scott Law Music. After performing with numerous bands, Law released his first solo album as a singer-songwriter, Deliver with the Scott Law Band, in 2005. This was followed by several other albums, including the acoustic album Black Mountain in 2013.

Scott Law played guitar in a band called Tough Mama, which included Mighty Dave Pelliciaro – keys, Dale Fanning – drums (Living Daylights), Arne Livingston – bass (Living Daylights). Started in 1987 they recorded an album called Seven Hidden Treasures.

As of the summer of 2013, he'd maintained a touring schedule of 100 to 150 gigs a year, hitting house concerts, small venues, and large music festivals. He has performed with groups such as Brokedown in Bakersfield with Nicki Bluhm, Darol Anger's Republic of Strings, and a duo collaboration with Tony Furtado called Banjo Killers. Willamette Week wrote that "Scott Law is infamous in Portland for his ripping, old-school blues and honky-tonk guitar work and manic stage energy." Acoustic Guitar described him as an "esteemed flatpicker."

== Early life ==
Scott Law was born in Southern California. At an early age he was exposed to music, listening to artists such as Merle Haggard and Johnny Cash through his father's record collection, stating "I grew up in a house where my father had a huge record collection, and an extraordinary hi-fi system. State-of-the-art, tubed power amps, Altec speakers. I mean, I grew up listening to music in the best tonal environment."

He wanted to play guitar as early as the age of four, and began playing around the age of seven when his father bought one for the home. He learned open chords, periodically playing for fun and taking occasional lessons. He also began playing drums, taking the instrument seriously and playing with friends in a band. At the age of fifteen he picked up guitar again, gigging within the first week with his first band. He continued to play and practice, stating "It was then that I decided I wanted to take a crack at being a musician, because it seemed to be the most rewarding pursuit at that time for my life." After forming a band with friends, he switched from playing drums to lead guitar because the band "had too many drummers."

He moved to Seattle, attended high school, and completed a BA at the University of Washington. He began working as an independent musician and composer in January 1992.

== Music career ==
=== 1999–2002: Early years ===
In 1999 Law founded Scott Law Music, writing music and performing as a live and studio musician. Among numerous projects in the late 1990s and early 2000s, he sang and played guitar on, and helped mix the Tough Mama album Seven Hidden Treasures, released on Liquid City on September 27, 1999. Law played guitar on the album Slide and Joy by the resonator guitar player Orville Johnson, released on January 1, 2000. Also in 2000, Law produced, co-wrote, and played mandolin and acoustic guitar on the Hanuman album Pedalhorse.

In 2003 he moved to Portland, Oregon, leading his own groups and collaborating with such bands as The String Cheese Incident, an established jam band from Colorado. The album On the Road: 06-19-04 North Plains, OR by The String Cheese Incident, released in September 2004 on Sci Fidelity, includes Law on guitar. Law then played mandolin on the January 2005 album Melting Pot by Melvin Seals, who is best known as the longtime keyboardist from the Jerry Garcia Band. By the end of 2005 Law had also shared stages with various jam acts such as the Tony Furtado Band, Phil Lesh and Friends, the Everyone Orchestra, playing guitar and mandolin and at times sharing vocals and songwriting duties. Also in 2005, during a benefit concert at Red Rocks Amphitheatre he was invited onstage by Phil Lesh, bassist of the Grateful Dead, to perform on Jerry Garcia's guitar, named "wolf." Stated Law, "To hear the tones emanate from my own fingers just as I had heard them on my first Grateful Dead albums and multitudes of bootlegs was a thrill and taught me some things. Holding that iconic guitar alone was also a mix of emotions. On one level, it's just oh well, lets see what's up with this cool guitar... while on another, it's holy shit, this is Jerry's guitar!"

=== 2005–09: First albums and singles ===
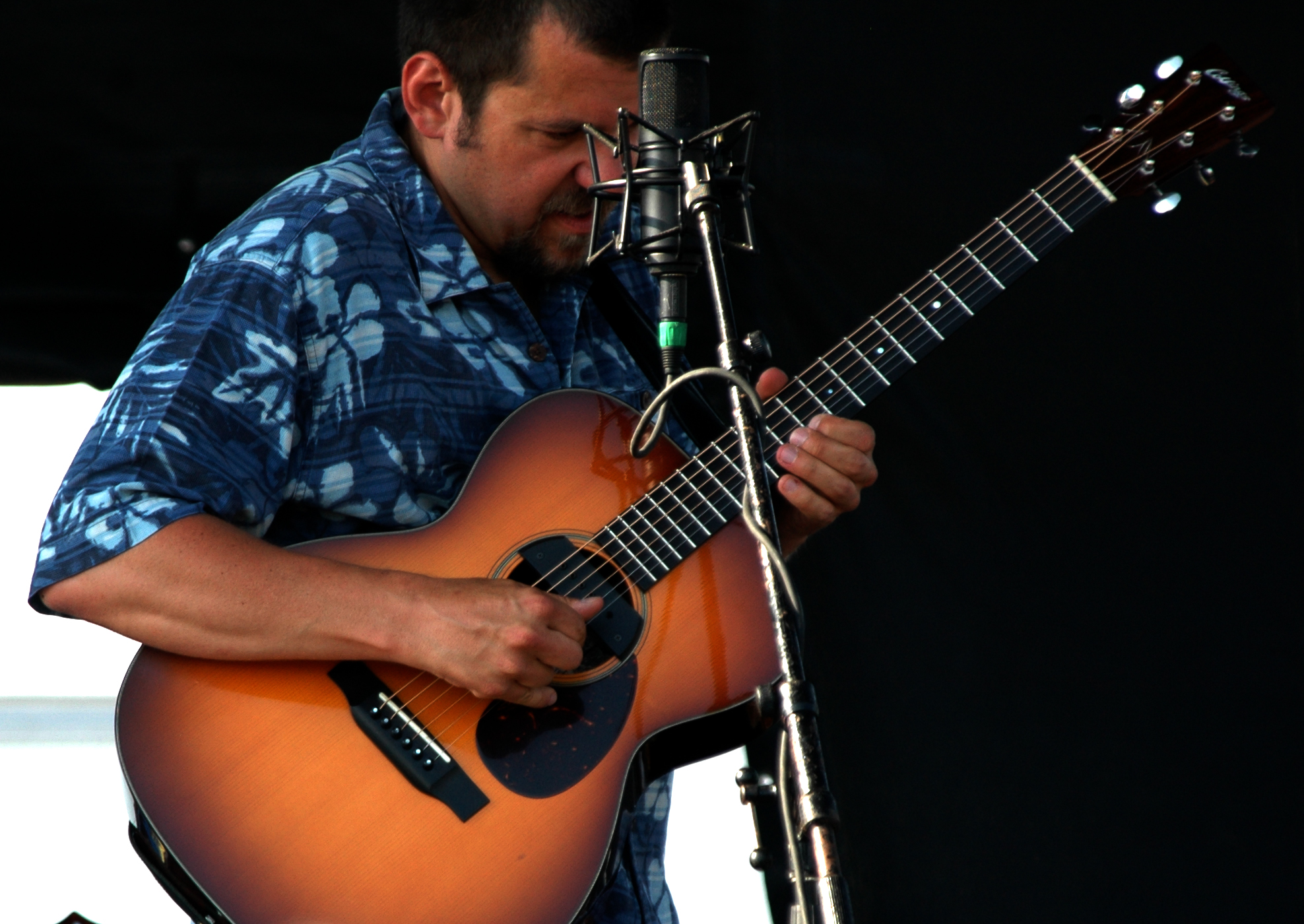
Scott Law in 2006

"[Law's] sextet blends breezy '70s rock with a tinge of funk, a hint of pop, a smidgen of alt-country and even a little newgrass. Refreshingly, his talented group focuses on songs over noodling and steps up as a cohesive ensemble on Deliver, its latest effort. The disc showcases a polished sound bolstered by Hammond B-3, a full horn section and a gaggle of backup singers."
— Denver Westword (November 17, 2005)

Law released his first solo album as a singer-songwriter, the LP Deliver with the Scott Law Band, on September 20, 2005, through Liquid City Records. It was recorded with five other musicians, as well as a number of guest artists. Denver Westword wrote in November 2005 that the album blends genres such as "'70s rock with a tinge of funk, a hint of pop, a smidgen of alt-country and even a little newgrass."

While touring with various lineups as his own bandleader, he also continued to work as a member of other groups. After the release of Deliver, Law joined the band Honkytonk Homeslice, and was a primary member and co-writer for their debut album Honkytonk Homeslice, released on September 5, 2006, on Sci Fidelity Records. In late 2006 he was a featured electric guitarist on the track "Shine" by The String Cheese Incident, which was included on the album On the Road: Travelogue, Summer 2006.

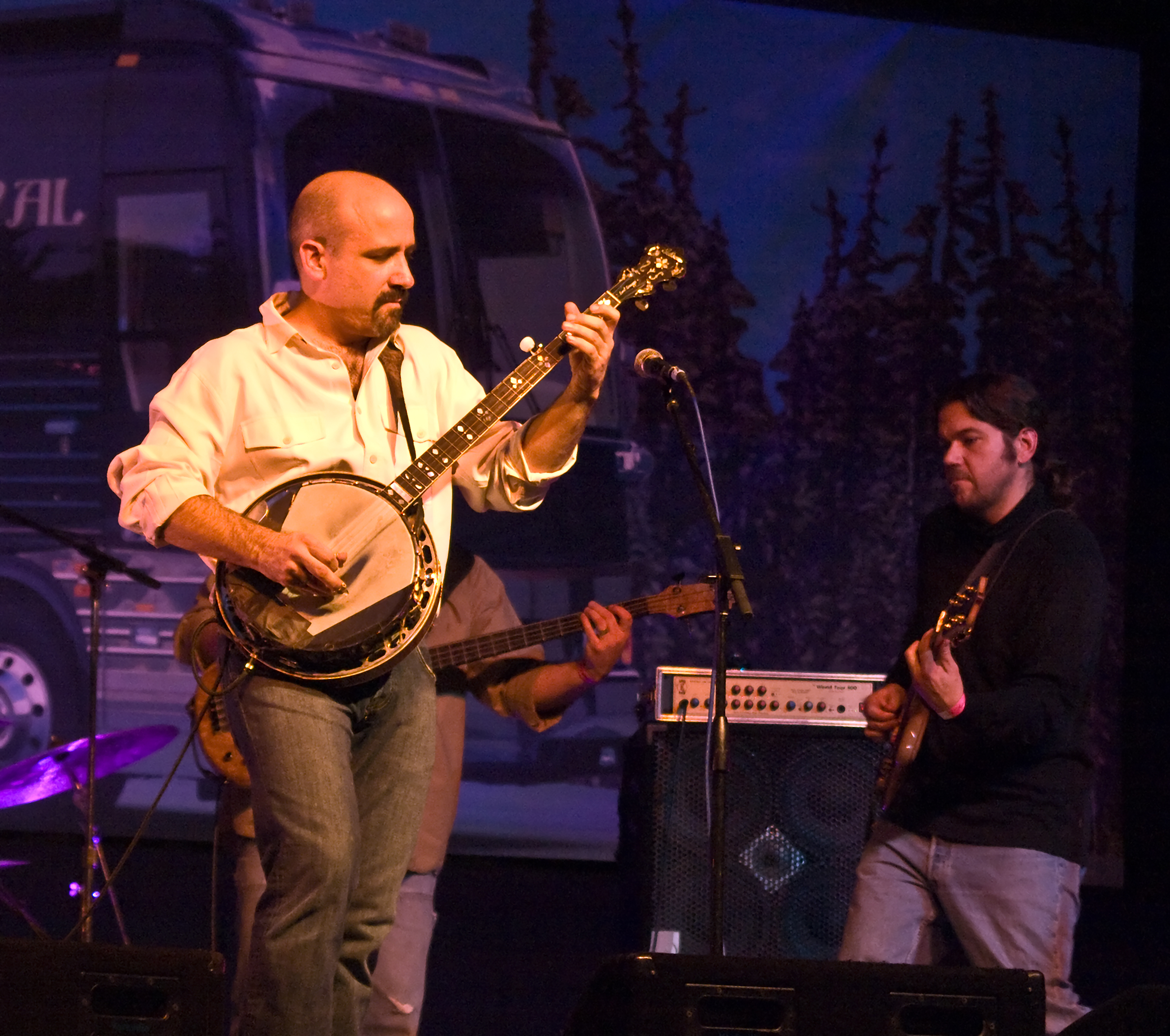
Scott Law (right) performing with Tony Furtado (left) in 2009

Law's solo LP Acoustic Collection was released on May 9, 2008, on Volcano Underground. On September 30, 2008, a live recording of the song "Window", a collaboration called The Piano Throwers with Colorado bassist Tye North and Portland drummer Carlton Jackson, was included on the compilation St. Jeffrey's Day – The Songs of Jeffrey Frederick, Vol. 1. While in Portland, North, a former member of the group Leftover Salmon, introduced Law to notable fiddler and composer Darol Anger, and for a short time Anger joined Law, North and Jackson to form a group called Strings for Industry. On February 4, 2009, Law self-released the full-length solo album Living Room, and continued to tour in support of both his solo material and with musicians such as Tony Furtado and Darol Anger.

=== 2010–13: Scott Law Reunion Band ===
External videos
- "Coal-Burning Grease Fire" Live – Darol Anger & Scott Law (April 9, 2011)

On October 1, 2012, he released the extended play Scott Law Reunion Band. It was recorded in the Southeast Portland pub the Goodfoot, where he and his backing band frequently perform. Willamette Week praised the improvisational aspect of the album, writing that "Scott Law is infamous in Portland for his ripping, old-school blues and honky-tonk guitar work and manic stage energy, which, naturally, means he's a singular live act." The review in particular praised the two original songs, but stated that the covers such as "Factory Girl" by the Rolling Stones and traditional pieces gave the album a "subdued" feel. The review further stated that "For those who have never seen Law's live show, the record is a good introduction. But for anyone who has heard the man shred in person, this isn’t representative of that experience."

By 2013 Law and Anger were playing together in a band called Republic of Strings, spearheaded by Anger. They also continued to do gigs as a duo. He was a composer and guitarist on the track "Till I'm Blue" with Tim Bluhm, included on Nicki Bluhm & the Gramblers by Nicki Bluhm & the Gramblers in August 2013.

=== 2013: Black Mountain ===
His full-length acoustic album Black Mountain was released on Volcano Underground on October 29, 2013. The album draws on acoustic music and the string-band sounds of the Appalachian Southeast. It also draws on influences such as bluegrass, alt-country, celtic music, and jam bands. Law produced the album himself, and it was recorded on two-inch tape live in studio with a band and several guest artists. Among the band members were progressive bluegrass quintet The Deadly Gentlemen, vocalist Aoife O’Donovan of Prairie Home Companion, and vocalist and Law's frequent collaborator Nicki Bluhm. Darol Anger is featured on fiddle as well, and there are four purely instrumental tracks on the album, including "Melinda's Reel."

The album was largely well received. Relix Magazine praised the covers such as Danny Barnes’ "Get It While You Can" and Lester Flatt's "I’ll Stay Around", but also stated "this album reflects Law's own vision. The instrumentals (four in total, including "Melinda's Reel") highlight his expert, soulful guitar playing as a bandleader." Also, 'Leave the Leavin’ Up to You' is the perfect amalgamation of Law's style: vintage strings meet high-lonesome harmonies on a new classic."

=== 2013–14: Touring, recent projects ===
As of the summer of 2013 he had maintained a touring schedule of 100 to 150 gigs a year, hitting house concerts, small venues, and large music festivals. Throughout 2013 he was bandleader for a number of his own electric and acoustic groups, including the Scott Law Electric Trio. Stated Law, "it's sort of a power trio. It's not heavy, in terms of when you think of a power trio, but the players of the music are really strong. It's a sturdy, grooving trio." He also played in the band Brokedown in Bakersfield with Nicki Bluhm and Tim Bluhm, which includes band-members from Animal Liberation Orchestra (ALO) as well.

In November 2013 he ended a month-long tour of Europe with Nicki and Tim Bluhm, performing three-part harmonies together on a variety of original songs from their individual song catalogues. Law toured the United States throughout November and December 2013 in support of Black Mountain, hitting both coasts. Also in 2013, he had tour dates collaborating with Chris Funk of The Decemberists, Keith Moseley and Bill Nershi of The String Cheese Incident, Peter Rowan, and Tony Trischka. In the summer of 2013, he also performed duets with Chris Funk, a founding member of The Decemberists, as part of a Portland tribute to Johnny Cash. On New Year's Eve for 2013-4, he performed a show in Portland with The David Grisman Folk Jazz Trio, Darol Anger and Tony Furtado. As of spring 2014, he was playing in a musical duo with Tony Furtado called Banjo Killers. In May, he and Furtado held a concert in Seattle debuting Black Mountain, with a number of musicians from the album performing as well. Tony Furtado also performed a set of his own original music.

He was a composer with Billy Nershi for the title track off Song in My Head by The String Cheese Incident, released in April 2014. In September 2014 he was touring with Nashville bassist Samson Grisman, also the son of David Grisman. Grisman had contributed to Black Mountain, and they performed songs and instrumentals from the album, as well as the folk and bluegrass canon. On May 31, 2014, he performed with Phil Lesh & Friends at Central Park Summer Stage with John Medeski, Warren Haynes and John Scofield. In late October he performed at Capitol Theatre as a member of PLF, also performing other dates early in 2014 at Terrapin Crossroads, with the performances also featuring John Kadlecik of the band Furthur. He also spends one week a month in residency at Terrapin Crossroads.

== Style and equipment ==
"I try to be what I call a 'complete guitar player.' That means I love electric guitar music. I really came to the guitar first as an electric guitarist, and then I realized how much value there is to be gained by learning the acoustic instrument, and the fundamentals of playing the acoustic instrument have served my electric playing very well."
— Scott Law in December 2013

As a songwriter and musician Law is known for focusing on rock, blues, bluegrass, and original Americana. He specializes in electric and acoustic guitar, also singing and playing mandolin. As a guitar player, he has been influenced by artists such as the Jerry Garcia, Clarence White, Jerry Reed, Carlos Santana, Jimi Hendrix and Earl Scruggs. Acoustic Guitar described him as an "esteemed flatpicker," which is a style of bluegrass guitar playing he frequently employs on his recordings.

In January 2014, the Santa Cruz Guitar Company debuted the D-Law guitar, also called the Scott Law Signature Model. Company owner Richard Hoover worked with Law to create the design, which is intended to "accommodate [Law]'s diverse musical styles" and in ensembles would "cut through with clear low end, but with the warmth and trebles needed for pristine solo work." The 14-fret guitar is made of mahogany and Italian spruce.

== Personal life ==
Law continues to be based in Portland, Oregon as of 2003.

== Discography ==
=== Solo material ===
==== Studio albums ====
Studio albums by Scott Law
Year	Album title	Release details
2005	Deliver (with the Scott Law Band)	Released: September 20, 2005; Label: Liquid City Records; Format: CD
2008	Acoustic Collection	Released: May 9, 2008; Label: Volcano Underground; Format: Digital
2009	Living Room	Released: February 4, 2009; Label: Self-released; Format: Digital, CD
2013	Black Mountain	Released: October 29, 2013; Label: Volcano Underground; Format: Digital, CD

==== Extended plays ====
Extended plays by Scott Law
Year	Album title	Release details
2012	Scott Law Reunion Band	Released: October 1, 2012; Label: Volcano Underground; Format: Digital, CD

=== With Honkytonk Homeslice ===
Extended plays by Honkytonk Homeslice
Year	Album title	Release details
2006	Honkytonk Homeslice	Released: September 5, 2006; Label: Sci Fidelity Records; Format: CD
2012	Just Passin' Through	Released: 2012; Label: Format: CD

=== Guest appearances ===
Selected songs featuring Scott Law
Year	Single name	Album	Primary artist(s)	Role	Release details
1999	(Various tracks)	Seven Hidden Treasures	Tough Mama	Guitar, Mixing, Vocals	Liquid City (September 27, 1999)
2000	(Various tracks)	Slide and Joy	Orville Johnson	Guitar	Orville Johnson (January 1, 2000)
2000	(Various tracks)	Pedalhorse	Hanuman	Guitar (Acoustic), Mandolin, Producer, Songwriter	Omnivine
2004	(Various tracks)	On the Road: 06-19-04 North Plains, OR	The String Cheese Incident	Guitar	Sci Fidelity (September 14, 2004)
2005	(Various tracks)	Melting Pot	Melvin Seals	Mandolin	Rainman (January 25, 2005)
2006	"Shine" (feat: Scott Law)	On the Road: Travelogue, Summer 2006	The String Cheese Incident	Guitar (Electric)	Sci Fidelity (November 14, 2006)
2008	(Various tracks)	Mississippi Studios: Live, Vol. 3	Various	Guitar	Mississippi (March 18, 2008)
2013	"Till I'm Blue" (with Tim Bluhm)	Nicki Bluhm & the Gramblers	Nicki Bluhm & the Gramblers	Composer, guitar	Little Sur (August 27, 2013)
2014	"Song in My Head" (with Billy Nershi)	Song in My Head	The String Cheese Incident	Composer	Loud & Proud (April 29, 2014)

== See also ==
- List of singer-songwriters
