= Nicki Bluhm and the Gramblers =

American country music band

- Origin: San Francisco, California, U.S.
- Genres: Rock, soul, alt-country, folk
- Years active: 2008–2017
- Label: Little Sur Records
- Past members: Nicki Bluhm; Deren Ney; Steve Adams; Dave Mulligan; Mike Curry; Bill Cramer; Tim Bluhm
- Website: Nicki Bluhm

Nicki Bluhm and the Gramblers were an American band, formed in 2008 in San Francisco. Band members included Nicki Bluhm, Steve Adams and formerly Tim Bluhm. The band has released four albums: Toby's Song, Driftwood, Self-Titled, and Loved Wild Lost, and their "Van Sessions" videos have been popular on YouTube. Most of their songs are written by Nicki Bluhm and other members.

== "Toby's Song"; formation of the Gramblers ==
Nicki Bluhm has said she sang as a teenager in the Bay Area and took up guitar in college in San Diego. She met Tim Bluhm, singer of Bay Area cult favorite the Mother Hips, who offered to produce tracks for her in his home studio. Sometime during this period, guitarist Deren Ney, a friend from high school, joined Bluhm for her live shows. The record, "Toby's Song" (Little Knickers, 2008), featured Ney, singer/songwriter Jackie Greene (Jackie Greene Band, Phil Lesh and Friends, The Black Crowes), ALO's Steve Adams (bass) and The Mother Hips' John Hofer (drums). When Toby's Song was released Bluhm added "The Gramblers" to reflect the full-band lineup.

In an interview with The Independent, Bluhm said:

"There’s four songwriters in the band — me, Tim, lead guitarist Deren Ney, and rhythm guitarist Dave Mulligan. Basically we all write independently and then bring songs to the table and play ’em for each other. Typically we always like the songs that people bring in; I think there has yet to be a song that we didn’t like, which is really lucky. We all definitely have a common thread in our songwriting, but it’s all got some personality to it. I think it’s really cool to have multiple songwriters; it kind of diversifies the feel and the sound. So far it’s worked well for us."

== Driftwood ==
Bluhm's second album, Driftwood, was the first to be recorded mostly with the live lineup of the Bluhms, Ney, Adams, and drummer Mike Curry (Jackpot, Jackie Greene). Railroad Earth's Tim Carbone contributed strings to several tracks. Singer/songwriter Dave Mulligan joined the touring band on rhythm guitar/vocals following its release.

== YouTube success ==
The band's big break came when their "Van Sessions" videos, where the band performed cover songs in a van while driving between gigs, went viral in 2012. Their cover of the Hall & Oates song "I Can't Go for That (No Can Do)" racked up million of views and gained the band noteworthy fans like Cameron Crowe, Ryan Adams, and John Oates and Daryl Hall themselves. The band was featured on MSN, CBS News This Morning and New York Magazine. Bluhm subsequently guest performed with John Oates several times.

== Self-titled release ==
In June 2013, the band was the subject of an Anthony Mason piece on CBS This Morning in anticipation of their self-titled debut being released in August. It debuted in the top ten of the Billboard New Artist and Americana charts. The band made their late night talk show debut on Conan performing "Little Too Late (To Die Young)".

== Loved Wild Lost ==
For their fourth and, to date, final record, Loved Wild Lost the group enlisted producer Brian Deck (Modest Mouse, Iron and Wine, Counting Crows) and recorded at Panoramic Studios in Stinson Beach, CA. Loved Wild Lost was released in 2015. They released a music video for the single "Waiting on Love" starring Jason Ritter and Melanie Lynskey.

== Lineup change and new album ==
In the summer of 2015, Tim Bluhm departed the band. A public statement was released stating that Nicki and Tim would also be "separating musically and personally", divorcing soon after. The group continued, accompanied by other keyboardists including Adam MacDougall (the Black Crowes) and David Veith (Karl Denson's Tiny Universe) before taking an indefinite hiatus in 2017.

They have made no further statement on their status. Nicki Bluhm and Ney have both released solo efforts in the years since.
