= Fog City =

Fog City is a nickname for San Francisco. The term can further refer to:

- Fog City Records, a San Francisco-based record label
- Fog City (restaurant), formerly Fog City Diner, a former restaurant in San Francisco
- Chongqing, China, nicknamed Fog City (雾都) due to being one of the world's foggiest and cloudiest cities, with an average of less than 1,000 hours of sunlight per year
- General fogginess of a city
