= The Mother Hips discography =

Band discography

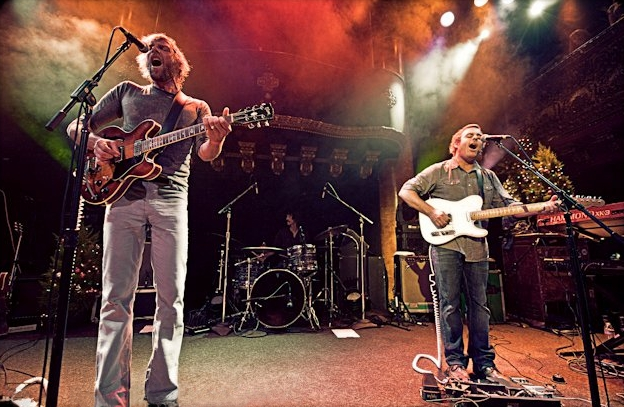
- Studio albums: 12
- Extended plays: 2
- Live albums: 5
- Compilation albums: 7
- Singles: 4
- Video albums: 3

The Mother Hips discography is a list of official studio albums, live albums, EPs, singles, compilations, videos and other recordings released by the band the Mother Hips. The Mother Hips are a rock band based in the San Francisco Bay Area, consisting of members Tim Bluhm, Greg Loiacono, John Hofer, and Brian Rashap. Past members included Isaac Parsons, Mike Wofchuck, Paul Hoaglin and Scott Thunes.

== Studio albums ==
Release date	Album title	Record label
Feb 1993	Back to the Grotto	American
Aug 1995	Part-Timer Goes Full	American
Oct 1996	Shootout	American
May 1998	Later Days	Mother Hips Records
Feb 2001	Green Hills of Earth	Future Farmer Recordings
Apr 2007	Kiss the Crystal Flake	Camera Records
Oct 2009	Pacific Dust	Camera Records
Jul 2013	Behind Beyond	Mother Hips Records
Jul 2014	Chronicle Man	Mother Hips Records
Jun 2018	Chorus	Blue Rose Music
Dec 2021	Glowing Lantern	Blue Rose Music
Jan 2023	When We Disappear	Blue Rose Music
Sep 2024	California Current	Blue Rose Music

== Live albums ==
Release date	Album title	Notes	Record label
2002	Live in Chicago	March 20, 2002 Chicago, IL	Mother Hips Records
2005	Everybody Knows This Is Nowhere	June 2005, San Francisco, CA	Mother Hips Records
2006	Live at Bimbo's 365 Club	July 14, 2006, at Bimbo's 365 Club	Mother Hips Records
2019	Live at the Great American Music Hall	December 15-16 2017, San Francisco, CA	Blue Rose Music

== EPs ==
Release date	Album title	Format
1992	Motherhips (EP)	Cassette
2005	Red Tandy (EP)	CD and Vinyl
2009	Pacific Dust	

== Singles ==
Release date	Album title	Record label	Format
1994	"Showing It All to Bad Marie"	Great God Pan	7" Vinyl
1995	"Shut the Door"	American	CD Single
1999	"Third Floor Story"	Orange Recordings	7" Vinyl
2001	"Life in the City"	Munich Records	CD Single
2005	"Red Tandy"	Camera Records	7" Vinyl
2008	"The Bees/Mother Hips"	Camera Records	7" Vinyl

== Videography ==
Release date	Title	Notes
2004	Stories We Could Tell	Documentary by Patrick Murphree
2004	This Is the Sound	Documentary compiling twelve years of footage by Bill DeBlonk
2006	Beauty Rock	Recorded at The Catalyst in Santa Cruz, 2003. Video by Dave Schwartz and audio by Vinny Palese.

== Compilations ==
Release date	Track Contributed	Compilation Title	Record label	Format	Compilation Type
1992	Showing It All To Bad Marie	Chico Alchemy	N/A	CD	Compilation
1993	Hey Emilie	Sony Music Regional A&R	Sony Music	Cassette	Promotional
1993	Probe Explodes	Night Of The Living Dead	Massacre At Central Hi	LP	Compilation
1994	Hey Emilie	Aware II The Compilation	Madaket Records	CD	Compilation
1994	Precious Opal	H.O.R.D.E.	A&M Records	CD	Promotional
1995	Shut The Door	hu H	Huh Music Service	CD	Compilation
1995	Shut The Door	The Fall Of American	American Recordings	CD	Promotional
1995	Shut The Door (Edit)	The Album Network No 8	The Album Network	CD	Promotional
1995	Suburban Child	Music For Swingers	Massacre At Central Hi	LP	Compilation
1995	Stoned Up The Road	Kink FM And Watt Present "Alle 17 Goed"	S.L.A.M. Department	CD	Promotional
1998	The Doomsters	Chico City Limits II	City Limits Records	CD	Compilation
2000	Sleepy Eyes	Chico City Limits III	Chico City Limits Records	CD	Compilation
2001	Third Floor Story	Sexy And Seventeen	Orange Recordings	CD	Promotional
2001	Channel Island Girl	Esto No Es Un Cactus	Sinedín Music, Munich Records	CD	Promotional
2001	Life In The City	Oorgasm 06	OOR	CD	Compilation
2002	Sarah Bellum (Live Acoustic Version)	Comes With A Smile Vol.5	Comes With A Smile	CD	Compilation
2002	Take Us Out	The Best Of American Music	Universal Music TV	CD	Compilation
2002	Sunday Mornin' Comin' Down	Don't Let The Bastards Get You Down	Jackpine Social Club	CD	Compilation
2005	Red Tandy	KFOG's Local Scene 3	KFOG Radio 104.5\97.7	CD	Compilation
2006	Red Tandy	The Cornerstone Player 066	Cornerstone Promotion	CD	Promotional
2007	Time Sick Son Of A Grizzly Bear	Relix 2007 July CD Sampler	Relix Magazine	CD	Promotional
2010	White Falcon Fuzz	Eldorado Sampler #8	Eldorado (French magazine - Fargo Records)	CD	Sampler
2011	Various	Days of Sun and Grass: 1991-2001	Mother Hips Records	CD and Digital	
