= This River =

This River may refer to:

- This River (film), a 2016 Canadian short documentary film
- This River (album), an album by JJ Grey & Mofro
