= Lochloosa =

Studio album by MOFRO
- Released: 2004
- Genre: Southern rock, blue-eyed soul, funk rock, blues rock
- Label: Fog City Records (2004)
- Producer: Dan Prothero

MOFRO chronology
Blackwater (2001)	Lochloosa (2004)	Country Ghetto (2007)

Professional ratings
Review scores
Source	Rating
Allmusic	4/5 stars

Lochloosa is the second studio album by the Jacksonville, Florida-based band MOFRO. The album was inspired by Lochloosa Lake, which embodies the natural part of the Florida heartland that the band often sings about in their songs.

== Track listing ==
1. "Y'all Ready"
2. "That Boy"
3. "Lochloosa"
4. "Dirtfloorcracker"
5. "Fireflies"
6. "Ten Thousand Islands"
7. "Six Ways From Sunday"
8. "The Wrong Side"
9. "Everybody's"
10. "Gal Youngin"
11. "How Junior Got His Head Put Out"
12. "The Long Way Home"
13. "Pray For Rain"

== Personnel ==
- JJ Grey - vocals, acoustic guitar (2, 3, 5, 13), electric guitar (4, 7), harmonica (3, 5, 6, 9–13), bass (2, 8, 9), tambourine (7, 10, 12), electric piano (8, 9), acoustic piano (9)
- Daryl Hance - slide guitar (1, 3–7, 9–12)
- Fabrice Quentin - bass (1, 3–7, 10–12), shaker (11)
- Craig Barnette - drums (3–7, 10–12), percussion (11)
- George Sluppick - drums (2, 8, 9), tambourine (2, 8, 9), backing vocals (2, 7–9, 12)
- Mike Shapiro - electric piano (1, 3–5, 7), acoustic piano (6, 10–12), organ (6)
- Malcolm "Papa Mali" Melbourne - acoustic and slide guitar, backing vocals (2, 8, 9)
- Robert Walter - organ (3)
- Todd Sickafoose - acoustic upright bass (10)
- Dan Prothero - producer, engineer, editing, mixing, graphic design, photography, programming
