= Etienne de Rocher (album) =

Studio album by Etienne de Rocher
- Released: February 2006
- Recorded: 2005
- Genre: Rock
- Label: Fog City
- Producer: Etienne de Rocher, Dan Prothero

Professional ratings
Review scores
Source	Rating
San Francisco Chronicle	(5/5) link

Etienne de Rocher's first full-length effort, Etienne de Rocher, was released in February 2006 by Fog City Records.

This Enhanced CD contains bonus audio and live concert video.

== Track listing ==
1. "Meditation # C.O.B."
2. "Juniper Rose"
3. "The Lizard Song"
4. "Providence"
5. "Six Feet"
6. "Big Black Wall"
7. "There's Real and There's Moonshine"
8. "Bama Bino Goodbye"
9. "You Became a Knife"
10. "Come Twilight"
11. "Everybody Thinks You're a Smash"
12. "Goodnight"
13. "Cerebro *"
14. "The Lizard Song" (solo version) *
15. "Everybody Thinks You're a Smash" (solo version) *
16. DATA TRACK (Enhanced CD)

[*] Appears only on promotional version

== Personnel ==
- Etienne de Rocher - vocals, guitar, keyboards, percussion, bass
- Todd Roper - drums
- Todd Sickafoose - bass

Dan Prothero - producer, engineer, editing, mixing, programming
