= Percussion interlude =

Percussion interlude may refer to:

- Percussion interlude, a break in music, an instrumental or percussion section or interlude during a song
- "Percussion Interlude", a song by Galactic from their 1998 album Coolin' Off
