= Country Ghetto =

Studio album by JJ Grey & Mofro
- Released: February 2007
- Recorded: 2007
- Studio: Retrophonics Studio, St. Augusitne, Florida; Horns & strings recorded at Threshold Studios, New York
- Genre: Southern rock, blue-eyed soul, funk rock, blues rock, swamp rock
- Length: 45:17
- Label: Alligator Records
- Producer: Dan Prothero, Jesse Aratow

JJ Grey & Mofro chronology
Lochloosa (2004)	Country Ghetto (2007)	Orange Blossoms (2007)

Country Ghetto is the third album from the band JJ Grey & Mofro. It was their first to be released by the band's new label, Alligator Records, after JJ Grey & Mofro had left Fog City Records. The Gadsden flag is represented on the cover of the album with the words "Don't Tread on Me" on the rear of the booklet.

The album featured slower, more soulful songs such as "The Sun is Shining Down", along with faster, and more rock and roll type songs such as "War" and "Country Ghetto". The song, "The Sun is Shining Down", was featured in the opening scene of the finale of Season 3 of House of Cards.

AllMusic's Andy Whitman states that the band "revisit the hallowed but largely forsaken musical environs of swamp rock. Taking their cues from early Creedence Clearwater Revival and Tony Joe White, Mofro play a slinky, sinuous brand of Louisiana soul-funk-blues, while Grey himself alternates between the good ol' boy debauchery of Ronnie Van Zant and Lynyrd Skynyrd and the classic soul entreaties of Otis Redding and Clarence Carter." He goes onto to state that "Country Ghetto is a down-and-dirty delight, and a fine addition to the swamp rock canon."

AllAboutJazz's Chris M. Slawecki states "it's how Creedence Clearwater Revival might have sounded had they come along after grunge instead of before: Hand-stitched, unpretentious, honest blues." Doug Colette states "Country Ghetto feels like everything that is the blues while mostly sounding nothing like it."

== Track listing ==
No.	Title	Length
1.	"War"	3:28
2.	"Circles"	4:05
3.	"Country Ghetto"	4:03
4.	"Tragic"	3:30
5.	"By My Side"	4:10
6.	"On Palastine"	4:26
7.	"Footsteps"	2:19
8.	"Turpentine"	2:45
9.	"A Woman"	3:00
10.	"Mississippi"	4:28
11.	"The Sun Is Shining Down"	5:58
12.	"Goodbye"	2:58

== Personnel ==
- JJ Grey - vocals, keys, electric guitar, acoustic guitar, twelve string guitar, harmonica, bass
- Daryl Hance - guitar, slide guitar
- Adam Scone - organ, organ bass
- George Sluppick - drums
