= Ol' Glory =

Studio album by JJ Grey & Mofro
- Released: February 24, 2015
- Studio: Retrophonics Studios (St. Augustine, FL)
- Length: 58:36
- Label: Provogue
- Producer: Dan Prothero; JJ Grey

JJ Grey & Mofro chronology
This River (2013)	Ol' Glory (2015)	Olustee (2024)

Ol' Glory is the seventh studio album by American Southern rock band JJ Grey & Mofro. It was released on February 24, 2015, via Provogue Records, making it the band's only album for the label. Recording sessions took place at Retrophonics Studios in St. Augustine, Florida. Production was handled by Dan Prothero and JJ Grey, with Jesse Aratow serving as executive producer.

== Critical reception ==
Professional ratings
Aggregate scores
Source	Rating
Metacritic	58/100
Review scores
Source	Rating
AllMusic	3/5 stars
American Songwriter	2.5/5 stars
Classic Rock	3.5/5 stars
PopMatters	7/10

Ol' Glory was met with mixed or average reviews from music critics. At Metacritic, which assigns a normalized rating out of 100 to reviews from mainstream publications, the album received an average score of 58, based on five reviews.

Kris Needs of Classic Rock praised the album, saying "it's on those spiritual slowies that this crew rakes the biggest steps to creating the 21st-century southern masterpiece they are obviously capable of". Lee Zimmerman of PopMatters also gave it a positive review, saying "JJ Grey and Mofro provide a connection to the past and a time when talent and tenacity moved the music forward. Hallelujah for Ol' Glory. It's a prime example of what genuine Americana ought to emulate".

In mixed reviews, AllMusic's Thom Jurek wondered: "too many other tracks have one too many verses, could have used bridges, or been left off altogether. Ol' Glory may reveal a bigger, more multi-dimensional sound for Grey and Mofro, but at what price progress?". Hal Horowitz of American Songwriter concluded: "Grey and his band's drive, energy and enthusiasm go a long way to selling this music but at nearly an hour the effect is diluted. Leaving a handful of the weakest cuts in the vaults and honing the best parts from some of the others would have resulted in a stronger outing". Q reviewer resumed: "it's an accomplished production--but an unambitious production, a reluctance to soar".

== Track listing ==
All tracks are written by John Higginbotham, except track 6 written with Daryl Hance.

No.	Title	Length
1.	"Everything is a Song"	5:11
2.	"The Island"	5:03
3.	"Every Minute"	4:41
4.	"A Night to Remember"	5:29
5.	"Light a Candle"	4:21
6.	"Turn Loose"	3:18
7.	"Brave Lil' Fighter"	5:36
8.	"Home in the Sky"	4:50
9.	"Hold on Tight"	4:34
10.	"Tic Tac Toe"	4:38
11.	"Ol' Glory"	7:32
12.	"The Hurricane"	3:23
Total length:		58:36

Deluxe edition bonus track
No.	Title	Length
13.	"Santa Claus, True Love, & Freedom"

== Personnel ==
- John "JJ Grey" Higginbotham – vocals, acoustic guitar, electric guitar, pianica, clavinet, tambourine, dobro, horns arrangement, producer, artwork
- Kalen Dennis – backing vocals
- Andrew Trube – acoustic guitar, electric guitar, dobro
- Anthony Farrell – piano, organ, clavinet
- Anthony Cole – organ, drums, percussion
- Todd Smallie – bass, double bass
- Jeff Dazey – saxophone
- Marcus Parsley – trumpet
- Art Edmaiston – horns arrangement, baritone and tenor saxophone (track 6)
- Luther Dickinson – acoustic guitar & dobro (tracks: 2, 12)
- Derek Trucks – slide guitar & dobro (track 3)
- Dennis Marion – trumpet (track 6)
- Dan Prothero – producer, engineering, photography
- Jim Devito – engineering assistant
- Ken Lee – mastering
- Jesse Aratow – executive producer
- Tibor Nemeth – photography
- Brendan "Spookie" Daly – photography
- Thomas van der Kooi – layout
- Roy Koch – layout
