= Chronicle Man =

Studio album by The Mother Hips
- Released: 2014
- Genre: Alternative rock
- Label: Mother Hips Records
- Producer: David Dolger Schwartz; The Mother Hips

The Mother Hips chronology
Behind Beyond (2013)	Chronicle Man (2014)	Chorus (2018)

Professional ratings
Review scores
Source	Rating
American Songwriter	3/5 stars
Consequence of Sound	C+

Chronicle Man is the ninth studio album by the northern California rock band the Mother Hips. Released in 2014, Chronicle Man unearths eleven tracks that were recorded in the mid-1990's during the Mother Hips' tenure on Rick Rubin's label American Recordings. A stack of 2" audio tape was discovered in 2009 in a Los Angeles basement and was sent back to the Mother Hips, who then went through the tapes to form the eleven tracks on Chronicle Man.

== Track listing ==
1. "Desert Song" – 3:22
2. "El Pancho Villa" – 3:50
3. "You Can't Win" – 3:10
4. "St. Andrew" – 4:13
5. "Loup Garou" – 4:14
6. "Desert Moon" – 1:21
7. "Headache to Headache" – 4:33
8. "The Flood" – 5:13
9. "Chronicle Man" – 2:54
10. "Barefoot Sea Chantey" – 2:15
11. "Rich Little Girl" – 7:20

== Personnel ==
- Tim Bluhm – guitar, vocals, keys
- Greg Loiacono – guitar, vocals, keys
- Isaac Parsons – bass
- Mike Wofchuck – drums
- John Hofer – drums
- Danny Eisenberg – keyboards
