= Woody Mann =

American guitarist (1952–2022)

- Born: Haywood Lee Mann; December 30, 1952; New York City, U.S.
- Died: January 27, 2022 (aged 69)
- Occupation: Musician
- Website: woodymann.com

Haywood Lee Mann (December 30, 1952 – January 27, 2022) was an American guitarist.

== Biography ==
He was born in New York, where he studied acoustic guitar with blues guitarist Reverend Gary Davis from 1968–72. From 1973–78, he continued private lessons, focusing on improvisation with jazz pianist Lennie Tristano. He received formal instruction at the Juilliard School's pre-college program, earned a degree at Empire State College in 1974, and returned to Juilliard to pursue post-baccalaureate studies in music performance and composition from 1975–76. During these years he played with guitarists John Fahey, Bukka White, Son House, and Jo Ann Kelly.

Mann toured Japan, Brazil, and Europe. He performed fifteen times at the Great Britain International Guitar Festival where he was the U.S. Ambassador to the festival. He performed at the World's Fair Expo in Lisbon, Portugal and the Tbilisi International Guitar Festival. He hosted and co-produced the On Patriots' Stage concert series in Trenton, New Jersey, performed at the Metropolitan Museum as part of the Guitar Heroes exhibition in 2011, and played clubs and festivals throughout the world. The CF Martin company issued the Woody Mann signature guitar.

Mann founded International Guitar Seminars and Acoustic Sessions and authored books and DVDs, including The Blues Fakebook, Anthology of Blues Guitar, The Art of Blues Guitar DVD series, Lisboa, The Guitar of Woody Mann, and the Complete Blues Guitar Method. He developed an online guitar instruction site and conducted seminars and classes throughout the world. From 1981–2000, he was a faculty member at the New School in New York, teaching jazz improvisation, music theory, and acoustic blues and ragtime guitar. Mann taught at guitar workshops and camps in the U.S. and abroad, including Puget Sound Guitar Workshop, Port Townsend Blues Festival, Jorma Kaukonen's Fur Peace Ranch, Internationale Workshop in Tuscany, the Universitat Hannover in Hannover, Germany. He was a visiting artist at Berklee College of Music in Boston.

In 1999, Mann established Acoustic Sessions, a corporation that works in music production for television and films. He worked as a consultant for Yazoo Records and RCA Records as a historian and musicologist of early 20th century American music. He was the co-producer and musical supervisor for the documentary Harlem Street Singer, the story of Reverend Gary Davis.

Mann died on January 27, 2022, at the age of 69.

== Discography ==
- Stories (1997)
- Stairwell Serenade (1998)
- When I've Got the Moon (1999) with Susanne Vogt
- Heading Uptown (2000)
- Get Together (2002) with Bob Brozman
- Been Here and Gone (2003) with Son House and Jo Ann Kelly
- Together in Las Vegas (2004) with Orville Johnson and John Cephas
- Waltz for Joy (2005) with Susanne Vogt
- Road Trip (2005)
- First Takes (2009)
- Donna Lombarda (2009) with Duck Baker, Bob Brozman, Ed Gerhard, and Massimo Gatti
- Out of the Blue (2010) with Susanne Vogt
- Originals (2012)
- Tribute to the Reverend (2013)
- Empire Roots Band (2014) with Dave Keyes, Bill Sims Jr, Brian Glassman
- Conversations (2019) with Charley Krachy
