= Behind Beyond =

Studio album by The Mother Hips
- Released: July 9, 2013
- Recorded: 2010–2013 at Mission Bells Studios, San Francisco, CA
- Genre: Alternative rock
- Length: 51:03 (standard version); 59:02 (deluxe version)
- Label: Mother Hips Records
- Producer: David Simon-Baker and The Mother Hips

The Mother Hips chronology
Pacific Dust (2009)	Behind Beyond (2013)	Chronicle Man (2014)

Behind Beyond is the eighth studio album by northern California rock band The Mother Hips and was released on July 9, 2013.

On May 14, 2013, a new song, "Freed From a Prison" was made available for streaming on SoundCloud. On May 21, 2013, a teaser trailer for, "Behind Beyond" was released via YouTube showing the band recording the song, "Shape the Bell" in the studio. On May 29, 2013, the band announced the track listing for the record via their official Facebook page.

== Background ==
The recordings began in January 2011. Basic tracks had just begun when bassist Paul Hoaglin was fired from the band in February; however, Hoaglin was asked to complete the recording of the album, including a final series of backing tracks sessions recorded in August of that year. Hoaglin also contributed additional overdubs from home, including acoustic guitar, pedal steel, flute, clarinet, and backing vocals. Renowned virtuoso bassist Scott Thunes replaced Hoaglin in the band beginning in March 2011. Work on vocal tracks for, "Broken Open", "The Isle Not of Man" and "Best Friend in Town" commenced in July 2011. Producer, David Simon-Baker stated in August 2011 that he was working with the Mother Hips on their follow up record to Pacific Dust. In March 2012, it was confirmed that the mixing process would soon be taking place. In May 2013, the band issued a press release via Propeller Publicity confirming the record's name and release date.

== Track listing ==
All tracks are written by Tim Bluhm, Greg Loiacono & The Mother Hips.

No.	Title	Writer(s)	Length
1.	"The Isle Not of Man"	Tim Bluhm	5:48
2.	"Freed From a Prison"	Greg Loiacono	4:27
3.	"Toughie"	Tim Bluhm	3:24
4.	"Jefferson Army"	Tim Bluhm	5:54
5.	"Best Friend in Town"	Greg Loiacono	5:00
6.	"Creation Smiles"	Tim Bluhm	4:27
7.	"Shape the Bell"	Greg Loiacono	5:54
8.	"Behind Beyond"	Tim Bluhm	5:26
9.	"Rose of Rainbows"	Tim Bluhm	6:51
10.	"Song for J.B."	Tim Bluhm	3:52
Total length:			51:03

iTunes Deluxe Version
No.	Title	Writer(s)	Length
1.	"The Isle Not of Man"	Tim Bluhm	5:48
2.	"Freed From a Prison"	Greg Loiacono	4:27
3.	"Toughie"	Tim Bluhm	3:24
4.	"Jefferson Army"	Tim Bluhm	5:54
5.	"Best Friend in Town"	Greg Loiacono	5:00
6.	"Creation Smiles"	Tim Bluhm	4:27
7.	"Shape the Bell"	Greg Loiacono	5:54
8.	"Behind Beyond"	Tim Bluhm	5:26
9.	"Rose of Rainbows"	Tim Bluhm	6:51
10.	"Song for J.B."	Tim Bluhm	3:52
11.	"Broken Open (Bonus Track)"	Tim Bluhm	4:24
12.	"Old Greenway (Bonus Track)"		3:35
Total length:			59:02
