= Deren Ney =

American singer and songwriter

- Born: Deren Michael Ney; Berkeley, California, U.S.
- Genres: Rock; Americana; Alternative Country; Singer Songwriter
- Occupations: Singer-songwriter, guitarist, record producer, filmmaker
- Instruments: Vocals, guitar, keys
- Years active: 2008–present
- Label: Volplane Records
- Website: derenney.com

Deren Michael Ney is an American musician, songwriter and filmmaker from San Francisco, California. He performed with Nicki Bluhm and The Gramblers before making his solo debut in 2019 with "West Coast Mama" on Volplane Records.

A multi-instrumentalist, Guitar World editor and The Allman Brothers Band biographer Alan Paul described him as "a secret weapon of sorts."

== Biography ==
Ney and former classmate Nicki Bluhm formed the band Nicki Bluhm and The Gramblers in San Francisco in 2008. Bluhm told The Mercury News in 2012, “Initially, I was a solo artist. I quickly realized I didn’t like that. It was hard to cut through the noise in clubs all alone. I asked Deren to come with me."

The band's 2012 performance of Hall and Oates' I Can't Go For That (No Can Do) in their tour van amassed over a million views and prompted them to go on a North American tour.

== Discography ==
=== Solo ===
- West Coast Mama, single, (Volplane Records, 2019)
- Crown Shyness (Stay Home and Get High), single, (Volplane Records, 2020)
- You Ain't Goin' Nowhere, single, (Volplane Records, 2020)
- Easy Money, single, (Volplane Records, 2021)

=== Nicki Bluhm and The Gramblers ===
- Toby's Song (Little Knickers, 2008)
- Driftwood (Little Knickers, 2011, re-released 2012 on Little Sur Records, 2012)
- Nicki Bluhm and The Gramblers (Little Sur Records, 2013)
- Love Wild Lost (Little Sur Records, 2015)

=== Dave Mulligan ===
- Runaway Blues (2012)

=== Painted Horses ===
- Painted Horses (2019)

== Backline ==
Following the suicide of guitarist Neal Casal in 2019, Ney's widely-shared remembrance of his friend helped inspire the creation of the mental health organization for musicians called Backline (though in a 2019 interview with the Jake Feinberg Show, he called his contribution minimal.)

=== As director ===
Year	Video	Artist
2014	"Another Rolling Stone"	Nicki Bluhm and The Gramblers
2019	"San Felipe"	Greg Loiacono
2019	"Close Your Eyes"	Greg Loiacono
2019	"Chamberlain's Trunk"	Greg Loiacono
2019	"West Coast Mama"	Deren Ney
2020	"Crown Shyness (Stay Home and Get High)"	Deren Ney
2020	"You Ain't Goin' Nowhere"	Deren Ney, Greensky Bluegrass, Infamous Stringdusters, Midnight North, Brothers Comatose
2020	"That's All"	Amanda Shires
2020	"All Come Together"	Leslie Mendelson
2021	"The Problem"	Amanda Shires
2021	"Drivin' Down to Georgia""	Tom Petty (FX shots)
2021	"Gone For Christmas"	Amanda Shires
2021	"Need Shelter"	Jaime Wyatt
2021	"No One Above You"	Marcus King featuring Eric Krasno
2021	"Bird With No Name"	Jimmy Herring featuring Circles Around The Sun
