= Dan Prothero =

American record producer

Dan Prothero is an American, New Orleans–based independent record producer, recording engineer, graphic designer and record collector. He has been called "the true king of raw" by AllMusic, for his emphasis on live performance, vintage analog recording techniques, and gritty drum tones.

He founded Fog City Records in 1996, and began recording a string of widely acclaimed debut records which served as a springboard for the careers of Galactic, Stanton Moore, Garage A Trois, Papa Mali, Robert Walter's 20th Congress, MOFRO (JJ Grey & Mofro), Etienne de Rocher, and Tim Bluhm.

As an independent producer, Prothero has also recorded follow-up records with artists including JJ Grey & MOFRO, Galactic and Robert Walter. He has also produced drum records with legends Bernard Purdie and Headhunters drummer Mike Clark, and created "Bulldog Breaks", the highly acclaimed (and widely sampled) series of breakbeat records.

Prior to starting his own label, Prothero helped develop the look and sound of Bay Area label Ubiquity Recordings from its inception in 1989, forming and/or producing many of the groups that appeared on its initial releases, writing liner notes and creating most of the graphic design for Ubiquity and its vintage re-release label Luv N Haight. He continues to design all of the graphics for releases on his own Fog City Records imprint, as well as programming the Enhanced CD content that accompanies them.

In addition, Prothero teamed up with Turntable Media, working on Enhanced CDs for Dreamworks and Interactive TV projects for Disney.

== Selected discography (producer) ==
- Galactic – "Coolin' Off" – Fog City Records, 1996
- Stanton Moore – "All Kooked Out!" – Fog City Records, 1998
- Galactic – "Crazyhorse Mongoose" – Volcano Records, 1998
- Garage A Trois – "Mysteryfunk" – Fog City Records, 1999
- Papa Mali – "Thunder Chicken" – Fog City Records, 1999
- Robert Walter's 20th Congress – "Money Shot" – Fog City Records, 2000
- MOFRO – "Blackwater" – Fog City Records, 2001
- MOFRO – "Lochloosa" – 2004
- Robert Walter – "In A Holiday Groove" – Fog City Records, 2004
- Tim Bluhm – "California Way" – Fog City Records, 2005
- Etienne de Rocher – "Etienne de Rocher" – Fog City Records, 2006
- Papa Mali – Do Your Thing – 2007
- JJ Grey & MOFRO – "Country Ghetto" – 2007
- JJ Grey & MOFRO – "Orange Blossoms" – 2008
- JJ Grey & MOFRO – "Georgia Warhorse" – 2010
- Tim Bluhm & Nicki Bluhm – "Duets" – 2011
- JJ Grey & MOFRO – "This River" – 2013
- JJ Grey & MOFRO – "Ol Glory" – 2015

== Selected discography (Enhanced CD Programming) ==
- Galactic – "Coolin' Off" – Fog City Records, 1996
- Elliot Smith – "XO" – DreamWorks Records, 1998
- Stanton Moore – "All Kooked Out!" – Fog City Records, 1998
- Rufus Wainwright – "Rufus Wainwright" – DreamWorks Records, 1998
- KiNA – "BiOGRAPHY" – DreamWorks Records, 1999
- Papa Mali – "Thunder Chicken" – Fog City Records, 1999
- Robert Walter's 20th Congress – "Money Shot" – Fog City Records, 2000
- Rollins Band – "Get Some Go Again" – DreamWorks Records, 2000
- MOFRO – "Blackwater" – Fog City Records, 2001
- MOFRO – "Lochloosa" – Fog City Records, 2004
- Tim Bluhm – "California Way" – Fog City Records, 2005
