= This River (album) =

Studio album by JJ Grey & Mofro
- Released: April 16, 2013
- Studio: Retrophonics Studios (St. Augustine, FL)
- Genre: Blues; funk; rock; soul; jazz
- Length: 49:00
- Label: Alligator
- Producer: Dan Prothero; JJ Grey

JJ Grey & Mofro chronology
Georgia Warhorse (2010)	This River (2013)	Ol' Glory (2015)

This River is the sixth studio album by American Southern rock band JJ Grey & Mofro. It was released on April 16, 2013, via Alligator Records, making it the band's fourth album for the label. Recording sessions took place at Retrophonics Studios in St. Augustine with additional recording at The Egg Room in Florida. Production was handled by Dan Prothero and JJ Grey, with Jesse Aratow serving as executive producer.

The album peaked at number 16 on the Official Independent Album Breakers Chart and number 9 on the Official Jazz & Blues Albums Chart in the UK.

== Critical reception ==
Professional ratings
Aggregate scores
Source	Rating
Metacritic	64/100
Review scores
Source	Rating
AllMusic	3.5/5 stars
Exclaim!	7/10
PopMatters	7/10
Record Collector	3/5 stars

This River was met with generally favourable reviews from music critics. At Metacritic, which assigns a normalized rating out of 100 to reviews from mainstream publications, the album received an average score of 64, based on nine reviews.

AllMusic's Thom Jurek stated: "the songs on This River are tighter and more deftly written than on previous offerings, but the more immediate, in-the-moment-of-creation production and incendiary performances keep things from getting slick". Kerry Doole of Exclaim! resumed: "as with earlier releases, This River is a seamless mix of Southern soul, rock, funk and blues". David Maine of PopMatters praised the album, saying "a classic mix of heart-tugging tunes and pound-your-boots rave-ups, This River might not be groundbreaking, but it sure is awfully good at what it sets out to do".

In mixed reviews, Joe Minihane of Record Collector concluded: "Grey's skills are undeniable, but this feels too all-encompassing to pass muster as a perfectly rounded album".

== Track listing ==
All tracks are written by John Higginbotham, except track 7 written by Andrew Trube and Anthony Farrell.

No.	Title	Length
1.	"Your Lady, She's Shady"	3:10
2.	"Somebody Else"	4:39
3.	"Tame a Wild One"	4:21
4.	"99 Shades of Crazy"	4:52
5.	"The Ballad of Larry Webb"	4:54
6.	"Florabama"	5:08
7.	"Standing on the Edge"	5:01
8.	"Write a Letter"	5:21
9.	"Harp & Drums"	6:15
10.	"This River"	5:19
Total length:		49:00

== Personnel ==
- John "JJ Grey" Higginbotham – vocals, acoustic guitar, electric guitar, bass, harmonica, tambourine, arrangement (tracks: 1–6, 8–10), producer, artwork
- Andrew Trube – acoustic guitar, electric guitar, lap steel guitar
- Anthony Farrell – guitar, piano, organ, clavinet
- Anthony Cole – organ, drums
- Todd Smallie – bass
- Art Edmaiston – baritone and tenor saxophone
- Dennis Marion – trumpet
- Dan Prothero – producer, recording, mixing, editing, photography
- Ken Lee – mastering
- Jesse Aratow – executive producer

== Charts ==
Chart (2013)	Peak position
UK Jazz & Blues Albums (OCC)	9
