= Blackwater (MOFRO album) =

Studio album by MOFRO
- Released: 2001
- Genre: Southern rock, blue-eyed soul, funk rock, blues rock
- Label: Fog City Records (2001)
- Producer: Dan Prothero

MOFRO chronology
Blackwater (2001)	Lochloosa (2004)

Professional ratings
Review scores
Source	Rating
Allmusic	4/5 stars

Blackwater is the first studio album by the Jacksonville, Florida based band MOFRO.

The recording was named One Of The Best Of The Decade In Music by amazon.com.

The Enhanced CD contains bonus audio and in-studio video.

== Track listing ==
All tracks are written by JJ Grey except as noted.

No.	Title	Length
1.	"Blackwater"	7:09
2.	"Ho Cake"	5:53
3.	"Air"	3:55
4.	"Jookhouse"	3:19
5.	"Nare Sugar"	4:17
6.	"Free"	2:56
7.	"Florida"	4:12
8.	"Cracka Break"	1:22
9.	"Lazy Fo Acre"	4:41
10.	"Santa Claus True Love and Freedom"	6:47
11.	"Frog Giggin'"	1:57
12.	"Whitehouse"	6:09
13.	"Brighter Days"	8:43

== Personnel ==
- John Grey – Guitar, Harmonica, Vocals, Group Member
- Daryl Hance – Dobro, Guitar, Group Member
- Kevin Ink – Mixing, Mixing Engineer
- Kenneth Lee – Mastering
- Fabrice Quentin – Bass
- Nathan Shepherd – Keyboards, Saxophone
- George Sluppick – Percussion, Drums, Vocals (background)
- Siemy Di – Drums
- Robert Walter – Piano (Electric), Clavinet, Soloist, Clavicembalo, Guest Appearance
- Dan Prothero - producer, engineer, editing, mixing, graphic design, photography, programming
- Jim DeVito – Assistant Engineer
- Chris Belcher – Photography

== Awards ==
- One of the 10 Best R&B / Soul Albums of the Year (amazon.com)
- One of the Best Of The Decade In Music (amazon.com)
