= Orange Blossoms (album) =

Studio album by JJ Grey & Mofro
- Released: 2008
- Recorded: 2008; Retrophonics Studio, St. Augustine, Florida
- Genre: Southern rock, blue-eyed soul, funk rock, blues rock, swamp rock
- Label: Alligator Records
- Producer: Dan Prothero, J.J. Grey

JJ Grey & Mofro chronology
Country Ghetto (2007)	Orange Blossoms (2008)	Georgia Warhorse (2010)

Orange Blossoms is the fourth studio album from the band JJ Grey & Mofro. The album was recorded in north Florida, and features 12 songs (including 11 Grey originals) inspired by Grey's experiences and observations. The sole cover is a rendition of "Everything Good Is Bad", originally by Detroit act 100 Proof (Aged In Soul) on Hot Wax Records. Accompanying are guitarist Daryl Hance, bassist/organist Adam Scone, drummer Anthony Cole, saxophonist Art Edmaiston and trumpeter Dennis Marion.

== Track listing ==
No.	Title	Length
1.	"Orange Blossoms"	4:41
2.	"The Devil You Know"	3:34
3.	"Everything Good Is Bad"	3:40
4.	"She Don't Know"	3:37
5.	"The Truth"	4:17
6.	"Wylf (What You're Looking For)"	4:16
7.	"On Fire"	4:26
8.	"Move It on"	6:55
9.	"Higher You Climb"	4:08
10.	"Dew Drops"	3:38
11.	"Ybor City"	4:24
12.	"I Believe (In Everything)"	6:09

== Personnel ==
- JJ Grey - lead vocal, lead and rhythm guitar, sitar, pianos, clavinet, talkbox, harmonica, percussion and bass on tracks 7 and 8
- Daryl Hance - slide and rhythm guitar
- Adam Scone - bass and Hammond B3 organ
- Anthony Cole - drums
- Art Edmaiston - tenor saxophone
- Dennis Marion - trumpet
- Clay Watson - trombone
