= Part-Timer Goes Full =

Studio album by The Mother Hips
- Released: August 22, 1995
- Genre: Alternative rock
- Label: American
- Producer: Paul Hoaglin and The Mother Hips

The Mother Hips chronology
Showing It All To Bad Marie 7" Vinyl	Part-Timer Goes Full	Shootout

Part-Timer Goes Full is the second album by the California rock band the Mother Hips, released in 1995. The band supported the album by playing the 1995 H.O.R.D.E. festival.

== Production ==
Most of the album's songs were written by Tim Bluhm. The band captured a total of 26 songs for Part-Timer Goes Full. The album was mostly recorded live, with few overdubs.

== Critical reception ==
Professional ratings
Review scores
Source	Rating
AllMusic	4/5 stars

The Press Democrat called the album "soothing psychedelia with an aggressive pop sheen." The Los Angeles Times deemed it "a gloriously authentic effort, unpolished but full of emotion, energy and the sheer joy of playing."

The Sacramento Bee considered it a "melodic, slashing and slightly funky rockabilly-urban blues hybrid." The Fort Worth Star-Telegram concluded that "the sound is reminiscent of both the Dead (a little) and Moby Grape (a lot more) but still original."

== Track listing ==
1. "Shut the Door" – 3:40
2. "Stoned Up the Road" – 3:26
3. "Mona Lisa and the Last Supper" – 3:21
4. "Poison Oak" – 2:58
5. "Afternoon After Afternoon" – 4:34
6. "Magazine" – 4:02
7. "Are You Breathing?" – 5:18
8. "Pet Foot" – 2:32
9. "Sunshine Feel" – 5:02
10. "Tehachapi Bloodline" – 4:23
11. "Bent Carousel" – 3:23
12. "Showing It All to Bad Marie" – 5:48
13. "Been Lost Once" – 3:58
14. "Trunk Box" – 5:13
