= JJ Grey & Mofro =

American Southern/Swamp rock band

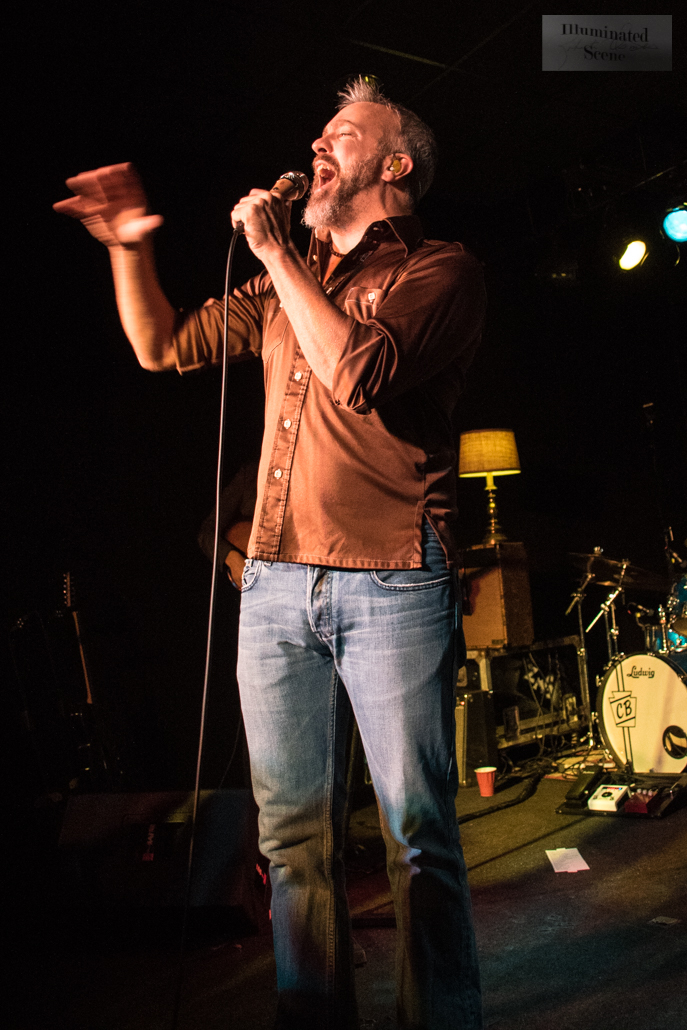
- JJ Grey performing in Davenport, Iowa, in 2016

Background information
- Origin: Jacksonville, Florida, U.S.
- Genres: Southern rock; Southern soul; blues rock; swamp rock; jam rock
- Years active: Late 1990s–present
- Labels: Fog City, Alligator, Provogue, Proper
- Members: JJ Grey; Eric Brigmond; Marcus Parsley; Dennis Marion; Craig Barnette; Pete Winders; Todd Smallie; Katie Dutton
- Past members: Zach Gilbert; Anthony Farrell; Andrew Trube; Anthony "AC" Cole; Jeff Dazey; Art Edmaiston; Fabrice Quentin; George Sluppick; Nathan Shepard; Mike Shapiro; Adam Scone; Steve Cybulski; Daryl Hance; Bea "B. B.Queen" Gayle; Tim Stombaugh
- Website: www.jjgrey.com

JJ Grey & Mofro (formerly Mofro) is an American Southern rock/swamp rock band from Jacksonville, Florida.

== History ==
=== Early career ===
The early days of Mofro can be traced back to the mid-1990s when John Higginbotham, aka "JJ Grey," and Daryl Hance signed with a United Kingdom label and played shows in Europe as Mofro Magic. Grey and Hance met in their hometown of Jacksonville, Florida while working for an air conditioning company and developed a friendship through music. Their first band together was a rock band called Faith Nation followed by a funk band called Alma Zuma. The deal with the record label in London fell through, and Grey and Hance returned to their native Jacksonville, formed Mofro, and signed with Fog City Records in 2001.

The name "Mofro" was coined by JJ Grey as an explanation of the sound that the band made. Grey says the word was originally a nickname that a co-worker gave him, and Grey adopted it as the band's name because it "sounded Southern." Grey later changed the band's name to "JJ Grey & Mofro" when his grandmother asked him if he was ashamed to use his own name.

=== Blackwater (2001) and Lochloosa (2004) ===
The first studio album released by Mofro was Blackwater, released in 2001. The album is full of songs inspired by the surroundings of where JJ Grey grew up, such as "Blackwater" and "Florida". A car accident in late 2001 involving several members of Mofro slowed things down for the band and it was not until 2004 until they released their next album Lochloosa. This album continued to deliver songs about where Grey grew up and the industrial progress that continues to plague the natural beauty of the areas around Lochloosa Lake and Orange Lake. The title track, "Lochloosa", describes the changing landscape in northern Florida and JJ Grey's soulfulness and deep beliefs come through in the song. Lochloosa would be the last album with Fog City Records and the last album under the name Mofro.

=== Country Ghetto (2007) and Orange Blossoms (2008) ===
In 2007, JJ Grey & Mofro became the new name of the band under new record label Alligator, and the album Country Ghetto was released. The album was produced by Dan Prothero and featured slower, more soulful songs such as "The Sun is Shining Down", along with faster, and more rock and roll type songs such as "War" and "Country Ghetto". The song "The Sun is Shining Down" is featured in the opening scene of the Season 3 Finale of House of Cards. The next studio album was Orange Blossoms, released in 2008. Orange Blossoms features songs such as "On Fire" and "Wylf (What You're Looking For)" that revolve around sexual themes more so than previous songs performed by JJ Grey & Mofro. It marked the fourth consecutive album produced by Dan Prothero.

=== Georgia Warhorse (2010) and This River (2013) ===
Their fifth studio album is Georgia Warhorse that was released in 2010. The album is named after a cricket that is found in northern Florida that is known for its strength despite its small size. The album features songs such as "The Sweetest Thing" that includes vocals from Toots Hibbert, from Toots and The Maytals. It also features Derek Trucks, from The Allman Brothers Band and The Tedeschi Trucks Band, on the song "Lullaby" playing slide guitar. Daryl Hance, who was an original member of Mofro, left the band in 2010 before this album was made to pursue a solo career. Hance was replaced on the guitar by Andrew Trube. JJ Grey & Mofro released This River in April 2013. The album features familiar upbeat songs such as "Florabama, "99 Shades of Crazy", and "Your Lady, She's Shady". Both records were again produced by Dan Prothero.

=== Ol' Glory (2015) ===
JJ Grey & Mofro released Ol' Glory on February 24, 2015, marking their first release on Provogue Records. Like many of their previous records, Ol' Glory contains tracks with southern inspired narratives with a unique blend of blues, rock, folk, funk, and gospel. It marked the seventh consecutive album produced by Dan Prothero.

== Musical style and influences ==
JJ Grey and Mofro's music has been described as a combination of blues, funk, soul, and rock. All of the songs are written by JJ Grey and reflect the region where he grew up in around Jacksonville, Florida. JJ Grey attributes artists such as Big Bad John and Jim Reeves due to their style of story songwriting and how that style has influenced the way he writes his songs. Grey also credits southern rock acts such as Lynyrd Skynyrd and Jerry Reed as artists who have influenced his style of music, as well as more soulful artists such as Toots Hibbert and Otis Redding. JJ Grey and Mofro are also known for their extensive touring schedule and have continually played at major summer music festivals including Bonnaroo, All Good Festival, Austin City Limits, Wakarusa, and Rothbury. Early on in their touring days, JJ Grey and Mofro gained fame within the jam band scene while touring with acts such as Widespread Panic, Galactic and Ben Harper. JJ Grey attributes most of the band's strength to their stage performances rather than in the studio.

== Discography ==
Year	Title	Label
2001	Blackwater	Fog City Records
2004	Lochloosa	Fog City Records
2007	Country Ghetto	Alligator Records
2008	Orange Blossoms	Alligator Records
2009	The Choice Cuts	Alligator Records
2010	Georgia Warhorse	Alligator Records
2011	Brighter Days	Alligator Records
2013	This River	Alligator Records
2015	Ol' Glory	Provogue Records
2024	Olustee	Alligator Records
