= Orville Johnson =

American resonator guitar player (born 1953)

- Born: 1953 (age 72–73); Edwardsville, Illinois, U.S.
- Genres: Folk, blues, jazz
- Occupations: Musician, singer, songwriter
- Instruments: Guitar, Dobro
- Years active: 1973–present
- Website: orvillejohnson.com

Orville Johnson is an American resonator guitar player born in 1953 in Edwardsville, Illinois, United States. He came up in the St. Louis, Missouri music scene. A frequent session musician, he also has released a number of solo and group albums. He has appeared on the radio show A Prairie Home Companion and on The Tonight Show with Jay Leno on television.

Johnson made his film debut in Georgia, appearing as a musician.

He is a singer, instrumentalist, record producer, songwriter, session player, and teacher. As his entry in the Encyclopedia of Northwest Music (Sasquatch Press, 1999) states, he has become a vital figure on the Northwest music scene. He has appeared on over 400 albums, movie and video soundtracks, and commercials, produced 22 albums for other musicians, and hosted a roots music radio show.

Johnson has taught at the Puget Sound Guitar Workshop as well as the International Guitar Seminar, Port Townsend Blues Workshop, Euro-Blues Workshop, and B.C. Bluegrass Workshop.

== Discography ==
=== Albums ===
- Music by A Country Band (1973)
- The World According to Orville (1990)
- Orville Johnson and Scott Weiskopf (1993)
- Kings of Mongrel Folk (1997) with Mark Graham
- Blueprint for the Blues (1998)
- Slide & Joy (1999)
- Freehand (2003)
- Still Goin' Strong (2004) with Mark Graham
- Together in Las Vegas (2005) with John Cephas and Woody Mann
- Deceiving Blues (2006) with John Miller and Grant Dermody
- The Sweeter the Juice (2009) with Laura Love
- Southern Filibuster: A Tribute to Tut Taylor (2010) produced by Jerry Douglas
- "We Heard the Voice of a Pork Chop" (2012) as Johnson, Miller & Dermody
- "Bitter Truth" (2013) as The Kings of Mongrel Folk

=== Instructional ===
- Intro To Lead Guitar (DVD)
- Resophonic Guitar for Beginners, Vols. 1&2 (DVDs)
- Tips, Tricks, and Techniques for Dobro, Vols. 1&2 (DVDs)
- Getting Started in Open D Tuning (DVD)
- Getting Started with Bottleneck Slide Guitar (DVD)
