= Coolin' Off =

Studio album by Galactic
- Released: July 30, 1996
- Genre: Jazz funk Jazz fusion Acid jazz
- Length: 54:12
- Label: Fog City (1996); Capricorn (1998); Zomba (2001)
- Producer: Dan Prothero

Galactic chronology
Coolin' Off (1996)	Crazyhorse Mongoose (1999)

Professional ratings
Review scores
Source	Rating
Allmusic	4/5 stars

Coolin' Off is the first studio album by the jazz funk band Galactic. It was released in 1996 on Fog City Records.

== Track listing ==
All tracks by Galactic

1. "Go Go" – 3:02
2. "Welcome to New Orleans" – 0:14
3. "Something's Wrong With This Picture" – 5:56
4. "Funky Bird" – 4:57
5. "Stax Jam" – 3:10
6. "Church" – 5:54
7. "On the One" – 5:29
8. "Mystery Tube" – 2:35
9. "Doo Rag" – 6:16
10. "Percussion Interlude" – 0:51
11. "Everybody Wants Some, Pt. 1" – 4:19
12. "Everybody Wants Some, Pt. 2" – 2:24
13. "Everybody Wants Some, Pt. 3" – 5:12
14. "Goodnight" – 3:53

== Personnel ==
- Theryl DeClouet - vocals
- Erik Jekabson - trumpet
- Robert Mercurio - bass, photography
- Stanton Moore - drums
- Mark Mullins - trombone
- Jeff Raines - guitar
- Eric Traub - tenor saxophone
- Dan Prothero - programming, producer, engineer, editing, design, mixing
- Raymond Pumilia - photography
- Rich Vogel - keyboards
