= Fog City Records =

- Founded: 1996
- Founder: Dan Prothero
- Genre: Jazz, electronic, rock
- Country of origin: U.S.
- Location: New Orleans, LA
- Official website: fogcityrecords.com

Fog City Records is an independent record label originally based in San Francisco. Founded in 1996 by producer/engineer Dan Prothero, the label's first release was Coolin' Off which helped the career of New Orleans–based band Galactic. This was followed by debut albums by Galactic drummer Stanton Moore, Garage A Trois, Papa Mali, Robert Walter's 20th Congress, MOFRO (JJ Grey & Mofro), Etienne de Rocher, and Tim Bluhm.

== Discography ==
- Galactic – Coolin' Off
- Stanton Moore – All Kooked Out!
- Garage A Trois – Mysteryfunk
- Papa Mali – Thunder Chicken
- Robert Walter's 20th Congress – Money Shot
- MOFRO – Blackwater
- Robert Walter – In a Holiday Groove
- Tim Bluhm – California Way
- Etienne de Rocher – Etienne de Rocher
- Papa Mali – Do Your Thing
- MOFRO – Lochloosa

== See also ==
- List of record labels
