= Etienne de Rocher =

American singer-songwriter

- Origin: Tuscaloosa, AL
- Genres: Rock; Singer Songwriter; Funk
- Years active: 1990s–present
- Labels: Fog City Records
- Website: EtiennedeRocher.com

Etienne de Rocher is a Berkeley, California-based singer songwriter who plays a unique style of indie rock. His eponymous album was released in 2006.

As of 2021, de Rocher is part of Athens, Georgia-based Haunted Shed.

== Studio albums ==
- Etienne de Rocher (2006)
- Lazybones (unknown)
