= Nicki Bluhm =

American singer-songwriter (born 1979)

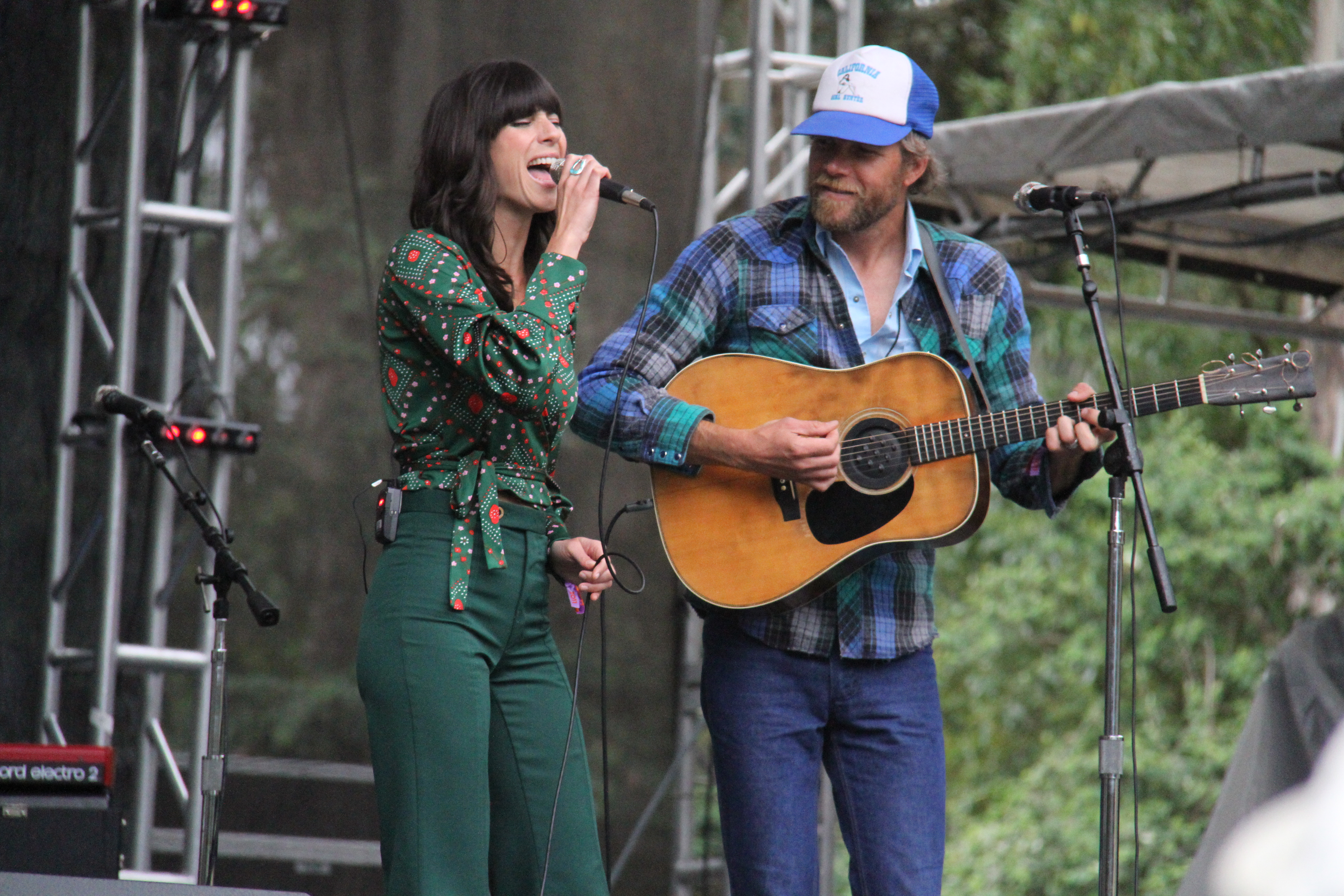
- Nicki Bluhm and Tim Bluhm in 2011

Background information
- Born: Nicole Ann Chambly; 22 September 1979 (age 46)
- Origin: San Francisco, California
- Genres: Rock, soul, alt-country, folk
- Occupation: Singer-songwriter
- Years active: 2006–present
- Labels: Little Sur Records, Compass Records
- Website: Nicki Bluhm

Nicole Ann Bluhm, née Chambly (born September 22, 1979), is a singer-songwriter from Lafayette, California, who formed Nicki Bluhm & The Gramblers in 2008. Since leaving the band, she has released two studio albums, To Rise You Gotta Fall and Rancho Deluxe. Her other solo albums, Toby's Song and Driftwood, came before the Gramblers.

== Career ==
Bluhm is from Lafayette, California. She was discovered by her later husband, Tim Bluhm, with whom she also collaborated and performed. The two were married between 2007 and 2015. Since 2008 Nicki Bluhm has released several albums including two with The Gramblers. They recorded the Queen and David Bowie song Under Pressure for the "Best Moment" segment of the Espy awards in 2012, and their YouTube video of the Hall & Oates song "I Can't Go For That (No Can Do)" has been viewed more than four million times. Bluhm has focused on a solo career but stated in 2018 that she is not "closing any doors" with the Gramblers.

In 2023 Nicki Bluhm toured with Phil Lesh and Friends, performed in 15 shows across the United States and Portugal, and released 8 digital singles covering the songs of Cher.

== Discography ==
=== In the studio ===
==== Solo albums ====
- Toby's Song (Little Knickers, 2008)
- Driftwood (Little Knickers, 2011, re-released 2012 on Little Sur Records, 2012)
- To Rise You Gotta Fall (Compass Records, 2018)
- To Rise You Gotta Fall Side b/w Right Down The Line (single) (Need To Know, 2019)
- Rancho Deluxe (Little Sur, 2025)

==== With her husband, Tim ====
- Duets (Little Sur, 2011)

==== With The Gramblers ====
- Nicki Bluhm and The Gramblers (Little Sur, 2013)
- Love Wild Lost (Little Sur, 2015)

=== Live recordings ===
==== With Brokedown in Bakersfield ====
- Brokedown in Bakersfield (Little Sur, 2014)
