= Tim Bluhm =

American singer-songwriter

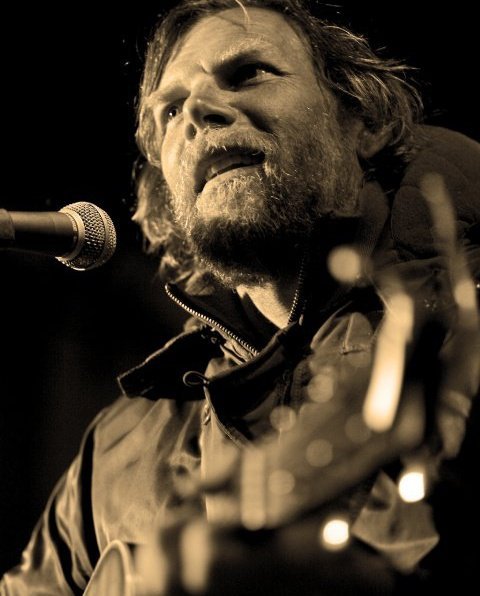
- Bluhm in 2010

Background information
- Born: July 22, 1970 (age 55)
- Origin: Torrance, California
- Instruments: Guitar, piano, drums
- Website: www.timbluhm.com

Timothy Andrew Bluhm (born July 22, 1970) is an American songwriter, producer, and multi-instrumentalist. He is the primary singer and guitarist for rock band The Mother Hips. He is part of the duos the Skinny Singers with Jackie Greene and Ball-Point Birds with Greg Loiacono, and has been a member of The Rhythm Devils, Brokedown in Bakersfield, and Nicki Bluhm & The Gramblers. He has also performed and released solo material.

== History ==
Bluhm grew up in Southern California and later attended California State University, Chico. He met the other three original members of the Mother Hips, Greg Loiacono, Isaac Parsons and Mike Wofchuck, in Bradley Hall. Bluhm and Loiacono formed a trio with Ali Weiss called Ali and the Cats that performed during 1990. At the start of 1991, the Mother Hips were formed and quickly became Chico's most popular band. They started touring and releasing albums. Bluhm moved away from Chico in 1996.

The Mother Hips took a hiatus in 2003 to 2004. During that time Bluhm played shows backed by the band Five Foot Tuesday. Together they were known as the Tim Bluhm Involvement.

In 2005, with San Diego–based singer-songwriter Steve Poltz, Bluhm founded The High Sierra Singer/Songwriter Workshop. The four-day backcountry experience offers attendees the opportunity to write songs and work with Poltz and Bluhm. In 2009, Bluhm's band the Mother Hips started the annual The Hipnic, a two-day music festival in Big Sur, California.

In 2006, Bluhm, Bay Area musician Jackie Greene, and engineer Dave Simon-Baker opened Mission Bells Studio where Bluhm has produced albums for The Mother Hips, Jackie Greene, Hot Buttered Rum, Dave Brogan, and Little Wings. The studio has hosted Phil Lesh, Los Lobos, Rogue Wave, Jonathan Richman, Josh Ritter, and ALO.

In 2007, Bluhm married Nicki Chambly and cooperated and performed with her and later her rock band Nicki Bluhm & The Gramblers. They separated in 2015. Shortly after Bluhm was severely injured in a speed flying accident.

In 2017, after several surgeries and several battles with infections, Bluhm signed with Joe Poletto, founder of Blue Rose Music from his hospital bed.

In August 2018, he released the single "Raining Gravel" (Blue Rose Music), produced by Dave Schools of Widespread Panic.

== Discography ==
=== Studio albums ===
The Mother Hips

- Back to the Grotto (Mother Hips, 1993; American, 1995)
- Part-Timer Goes Full (American, 1995)
- Shootout (American, 1996)
- Later Days (Mother Hips, 1998)
- Green Hills of Earth (Future Farmer, 2001)
- Red Tandy EP (Camera Records, 2005)
- Kiss the Crystal Flake (Camera Records, 2007)
- Pacific Dust (Camera Records, 2009)
- Behind Beyond (Mother Hips Records, 2013)
- Chronicle Man (2014)
- Chorus (Blue Rose Music, 2018)
- Live at the Great American Music Hall (Blue Rose Music, 2019)

Solo

- Land & Sea Chanteys (Hufa Records, 1999)
- The Soft Adventure EP / Colts (California Recordings, 2003)
- California Way (Fog City Records, 2005)
- House of Bluhm (Big Sur Recordings, 2008)
- Sorta Surviving (Blue Rose Music, 2019)
- Gone with the Windshield (Blue Rose Music, 2020)

Ball-Point Birds

- Ball-Point Birds (Big Sur Poncen Recordings, 2002)
- Two Discover (Little Sur Poncen Recordings, 2006)

Other

- The Sheets, The Sheets EP (Little Sur/Pacealot 2003)
- Dave Mulligan, The Late Great Southwest (2007)
- Little Wings, Grow (K Records, 2005)
- Paula Frazer, Now It's Time (Birdman Records, 2005)
- Jackie Greene, Giving Up the Ghost (429 Records, 2007)
- Skinny Singers, Strike Again! (Rope Stretch/Little Sur, 2007)
- The Traditionist, Season to Season (Banter Records, 2007)
- Golden Coast Productions, Surf Stronger Volumes 1 and 2 (2007–2008)
- Dave Brogan, Thunderbird Sun Transformation (2008)
- Hiss Golden Messenger, Country Hai East Cotton (2008)
- Nicki Bluhm, Toby's Song (2008)
- Chris Velan, Solidago (2009)
- Hot Buttered Rum, Limbs Akimbo (2009)
- Jackie Greene, Till the Light Comes (429 Records, 2010)
- Little Wings, Black Grass (2010)
- Nicki Bluhm, Duets (2011)
- Nicki Bluhm & The Gramblers, Driftwood (Little Sur Records, 2011)
